= Spirit of London =

London bus

19000 Spirit of London
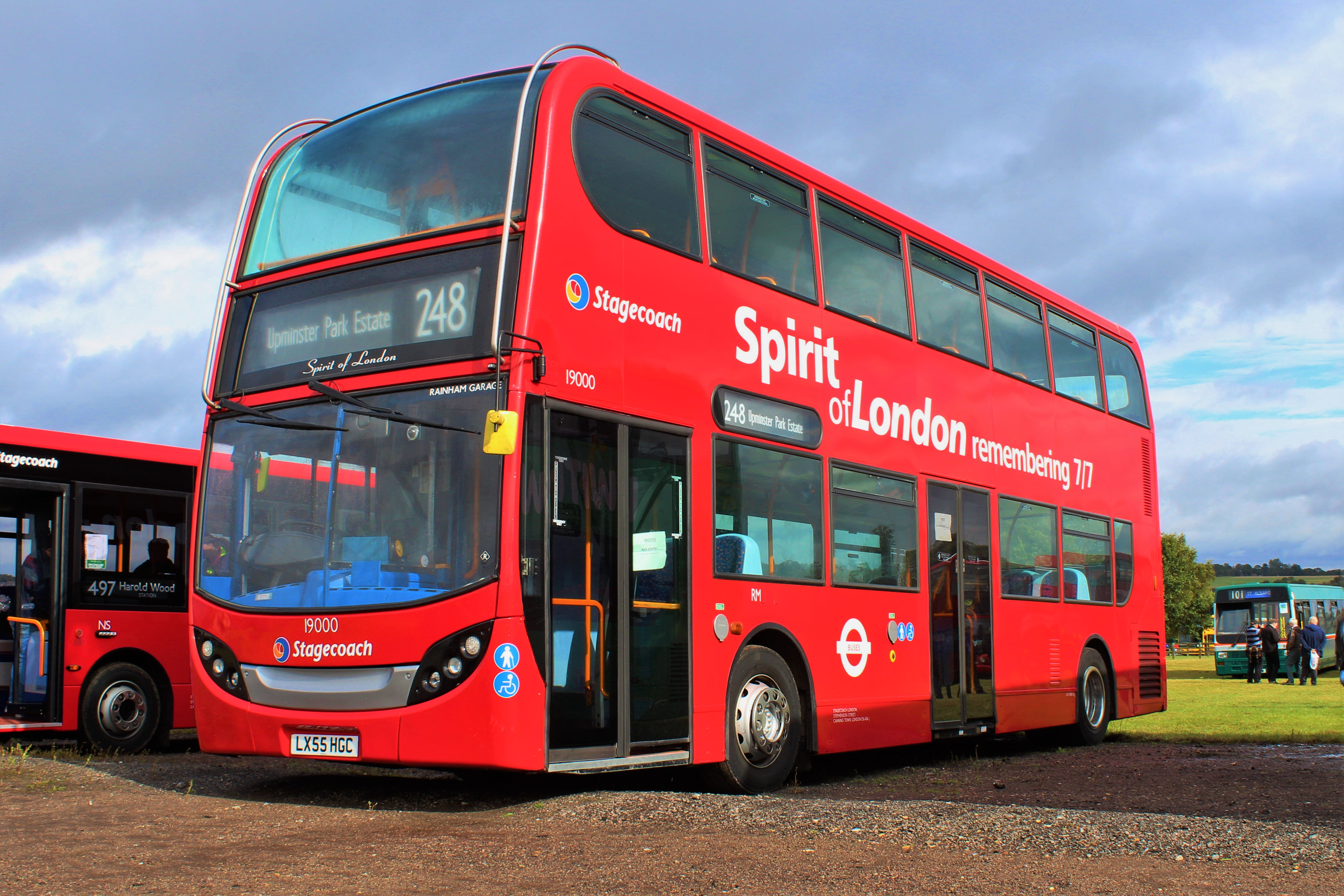
- 19000 Spirit of London photographed in 2019

Overview
- Manufacturer: Alexander Dennis
- Also called: 18500 Spirit of London (2005–2010)
- Production: Delivered 3 October 2005
- Assembly: Falkirk, Scotland

Body and chassis
- Class: Double-decker bus
- Body style: Low-floor, dual door city bus
- Layout: Transverse rear-engine, rear-wheel drive

Powertrain
- Engine: Cummins ISCe
- Transmission: Voith DIWA

Dimensions
- Length: 10.8 m (35 ft 5 in)
- Width: 2.55 m (8 ft 4 in)
- Height: 4.3 m (14 ft 1 in)
- Kerb weight: 11 tonnes (10.8 long tons; 12.1 short tons)

19000 Spirit of London is an Alexander Dennis Enviro400 double-decker bus which entered service in London in October 2005. Originally carrying fleet number 18500, Spirit of London was built as the replacement for the bus destroyed in Tavistock Square during the 7 July 2005 London bombings, killing 13 passengers. Spirit of London was also the first production Enviro400 built by Alexander Dennis. Throughout its time in service, Spirit of London has served as a tribute to the victims of the 7/7 attacks.

== Background ==
On 7 July 2005, a series of four coordinated bomb attacks occurred during the morning rush hour across central London, killing 52 people. Three of the attacks occurred on the London Underground, while the fourth targeted a number 30 bus that was travelling through Tavistock Square at the time. The bomb explosion ripped the roof from the vehicle and destroyed the rear portion of the bus, killing 13 passengers on board; the driver and passengers near the front of the bus survived with varying severity of injuries.

The bus involved was a two-year-old TransBus ALX400-bodied TransBus Trident double-decker bus, registration LX03 BUF and fleet number 17758, operated by Stagecoach London. The remains of the vehicle were taken to a secure Ministry of Defence site for forensic analysis immediately after the attack, before being returned to East London, Stagecoach London's successor company, on 15 October 2009, where it was stripped for usable spares and subsequently scrapped.

== Introduction and early years ==
Spirit of London, initially carrying Stagecoach fleet number 18500, was unveiled on 3 October 2005. It was the first production Enviro400 to be built; the Enviro400 was Alexander Dennis' successor to the Dennis Trident and Alexander ALX400, the chassis and body combination of the vehicle involved in the Tavistock Square bombing. It was originally assigned Stagecoach fleet number 18500, which is otherwise used for Trident-based vehicles. After a lengthy promotional tour, Spirit of London entered service on route 30 in January 2006, five months after the Tavistock Square attack had occurred on the same route.

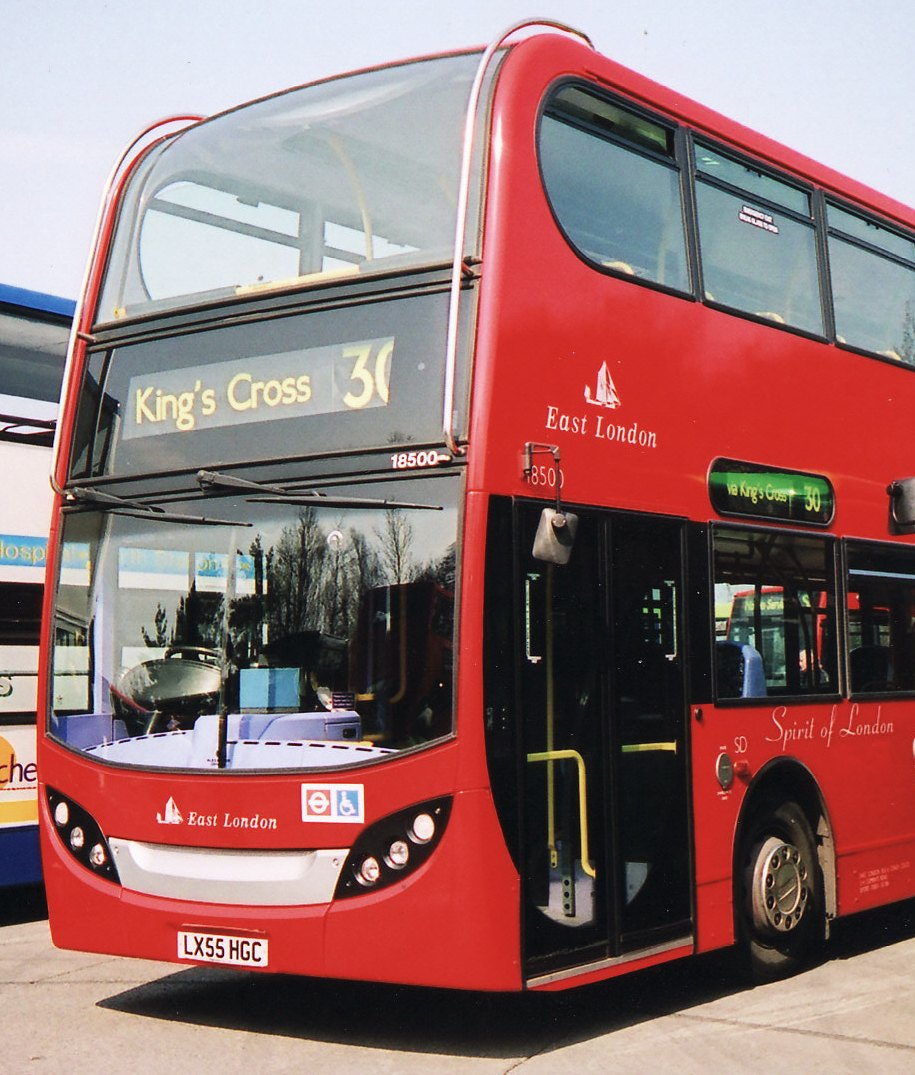
'Spirit of London', under the ownership of the East London Bus Group and with its original fleet number 18500

In 2006, Stagecoach sold their London operations to Macquarie Bank, who rebranded the division for which Spirit of London operated as East London. During the vehicle's operation with East London, it retained its Spirit of London identity and 18500 fleet number. Stagecoach re-purchased their London operations in 2010, rebranding again back to Stagecoach London; at this time, Spirit of London was renumbered to 19000, matching Stagecoach's national numbering system for Enviro400 vehicles.

== Fire ==
During the early hours of 19 October 2012, while operating on 24-hour route 69 from Walthamstow Central to Canning Town, Spirit of London was set on fire in an arson attack. The fire occurred while the bus was waiting at Walthamstow bus station. The London Fire Brigade brought the fire under control after it had swept through most of the upper deck, destroying the roof of the bus and upper deck interior, causing £60,000 of damage. The driver was the only person on the bus at the time of the fire, and was uninjured.

Following the fire, two 14-year-old girls were arrested by the Metropolitan Police on suspicion of arson. CCTV footage showed that they had set fire to pieces of newspaper, and then stuffed them down the back of seats, which then caught fire. By the time the bus driver became aware of the fire, the two girls had left the vehicle.

== Return to service ==
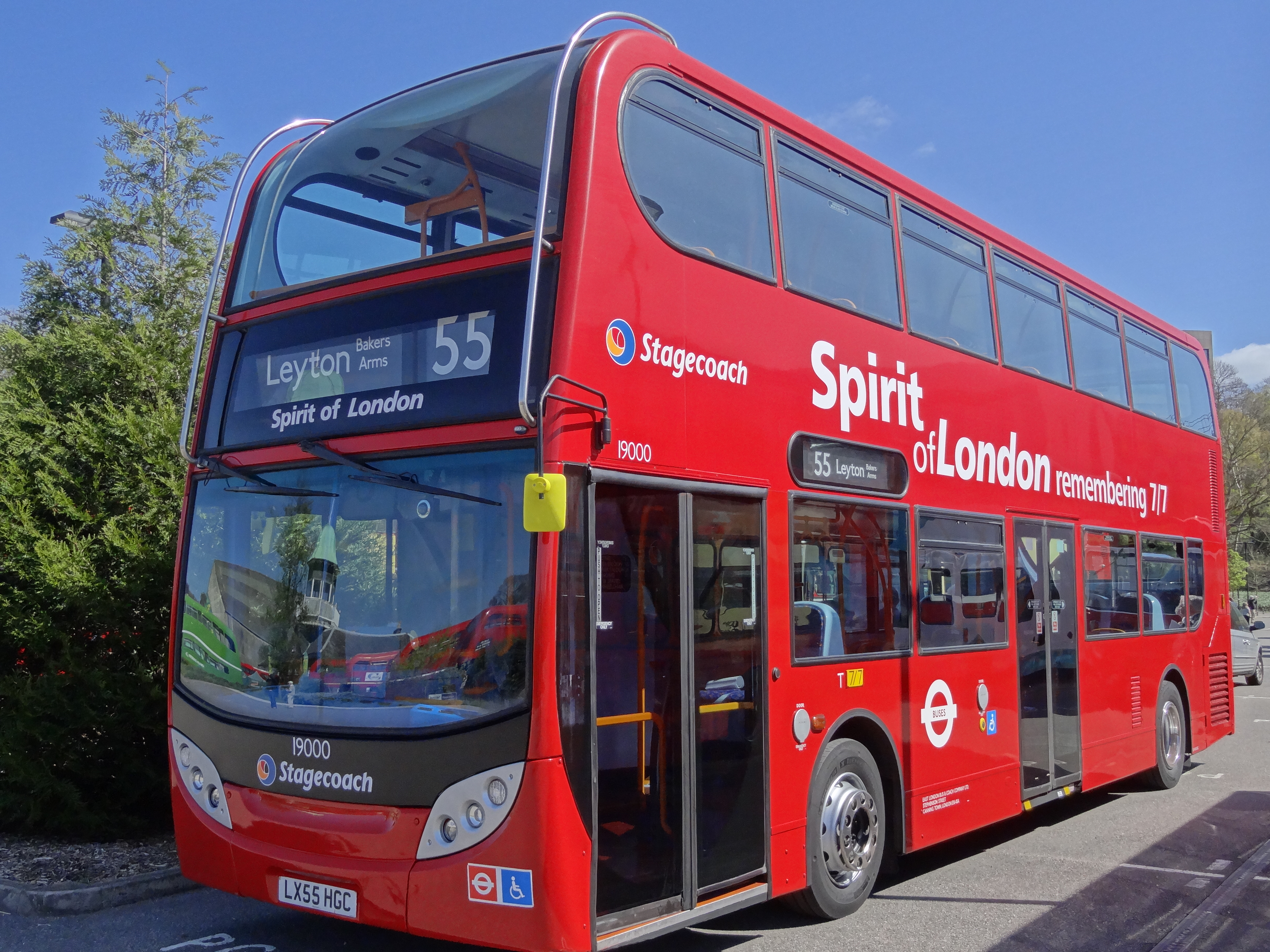
Spirit of London in service in 2014

After the fire, Stagecoach London confirmed that they would repair the vehicle due to its special status. Repair work took several months, during which the vehicle was returned to the Alexander Dennis factory. Spirit of London was relaunched on 21 April 2013 at the London Bus Museum in Weybridge. There are a few notable external differences to the rebuilt bus; for example, the rear end was reconstructed using panels from contemporary Enviro400s, with the registration plate thus moved from a glass containment panel at the upper-deck level to an inset holder in the redesigned rear bumper. Additionally, the Spirit of London branding was made much larger and more prominent across the side of the bus, and one of the panels below the front windscreen was repainted black as a memorial.

Spirit of London returned to service in April 2013 after the fire, initially allocated to route 55. The bus was withdrawn from service in October 2020 for preservation at the London Transport Museum; an ADL Enviro400 MMC delivered in 2020 with the fleet number 11377 was given Spirit of London branding to replace 19000.

== See also ==
- 7 July 2005 London bombings
- Alexander Dennis Enviro400
- Stagecoach London
- Bus preservation in the United Kingdom
