= London Buses route 48 =

Former London bus route

48
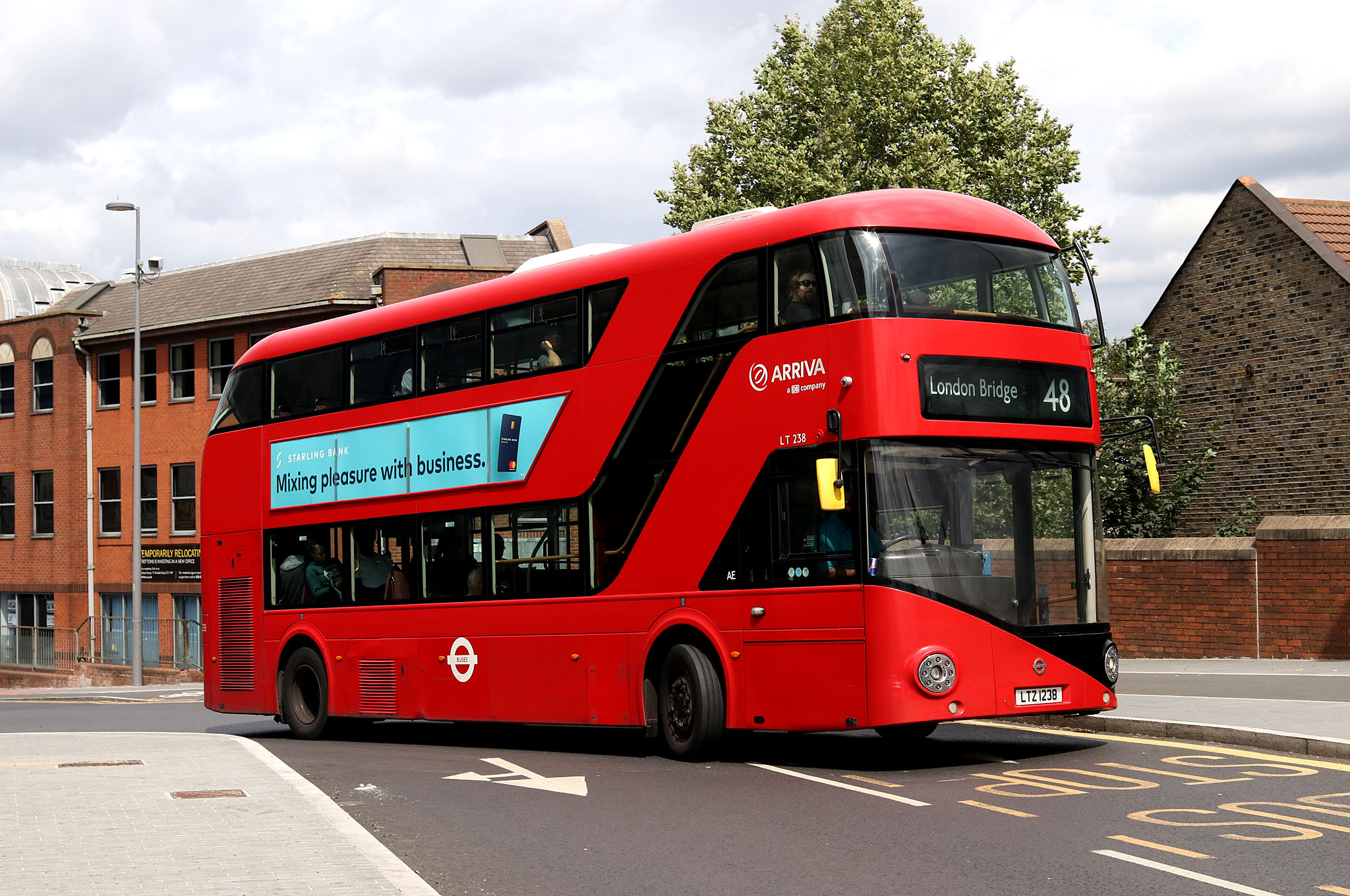
- Arriva London New Routemaster at Walthamstow Central station in August 2019

Overview
- Operator: Arriva London
- Garage: Ash Grove
- Vehicle: New Routemaster
- Peak vehicle requirement: 20
- Status: Defunct
- Began service: 7 September 1968
- Ended service: 12 October 2019
- Night-time: No night service

Route
- Start: London Bridge bus station
- Via: Shoreditch; Hackney; Leyton
- End: Walthamstow bus station
- Length: 8 miles (13 km)

Service
- Level: Daily
- Frequency: About every 8-12 minutes
- Journey time: 39-67 minutes
- Operates: 05:00 until 00:30

London Buses route 48 was a Transport for London contracted bus route in London, England. It ran between London Bridge and Walthamstow bus stations, and was last operated by Arriva London.

== History ==
Route 48 was introduced in September 1968.

In February 2017, operation of the route transferred from Stagecoach London to Arriva London.

In June 2018, campaigners claimed to be aware of plans to withdraw the route, despite no official announcement from Transport for London. In August, documents were leaked that discussed the withdrawal of the route. In October 2018, Transport for London held a consultation on proposals to withdraw the route and extend route 55 to Walthamstow. In April 2019, Transport for London confirmed it would go ahead with plans to withdraw the route as part of proposals that would save it £2.5 million per year.

The route was withdrawn on 12 October 2019.

== Former route ==
Route 48 operated via these primary locations:

- London Bridge bus station
- Monument station
- Liverpool Street station
- Shoreditch High Street station
- Cambridge Heath station
- Hackney Central station
- Mare Street for Hackney Downs station
- Clapton Pond Lea Bridge Roundabout
- Lea Bridge station
- Leyton Bakers Arms
- Walthamstow bus station
