= London Buses route 97 =

London bus route

97
- Lea Interchange Bus Company Wright StreetDeck HEV at Walthamstow Central station in September 2026

Overview
- Operator: Lea Interchange Bus Company (Stagecoach London)
- Garage: Lea Interchange
- Vehicle: Wright StreetDeck HEV; Volvo B5LH Alexander Dennis Enviro400 MMC
- Peak vehicle requirement: 20
- Predecessors: Route 69

Route
- Start: Chingford station
- Via: Chingford Mount; Walthamstow; Bakers Arms; Leyton
- End: Stratford City bus station
- Length: 11 miles (18 km)

Service
- Level: Daily
- Frequency: About every 8-15 minutes

London Buses route 97 is a Transport for London contracted bus route in London, England. Running between Chingford station and Stratford City bus station, it is operated by Stagecoach London subsidiary Lea Interchange Bus Company.

== History ==
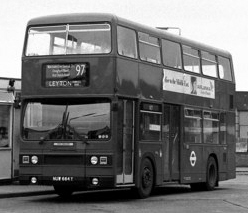
Leyland Titan at Chingford station in March 1985

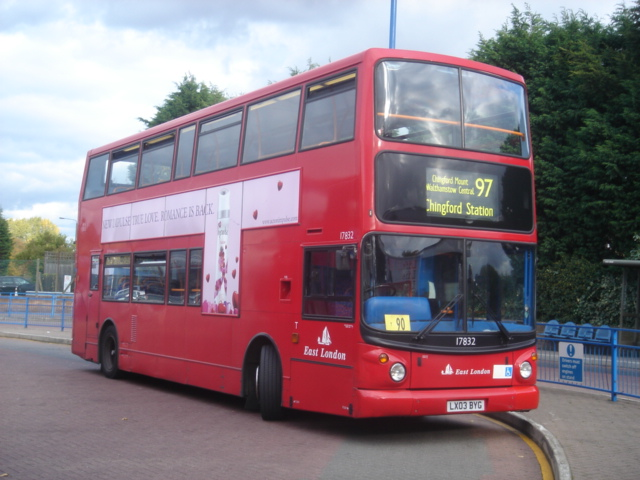
East London Alexander ALX400 bodied Dennis Trident 2 at Chingford station in October 2008

On 31 January 1981, Route 97 was introduced to replace the northern leg of Route 69 between Leyton and Chingford, replacing Routemasters on that section. It was withdrawn temporarily between June 1987 and November 1988 when it was covered by the 69 again. The 97 was operated by London Forest until 1991, when that company was wound up. The route passed to Capital Citybus on 23 November 1991. Route 97 was included in the July 1998 sale of Capital Citybus to First London.

Upon being re-tendered, it was retained by First London with a new contract commencing on 26 February 2000. When next tendered, it passed to Stagecoach London's Leyton garage with a new contract commencing on 5 March 2005. Stagecoach London commenced a further contract on 6 March 2010.

On 10 September 2011, route 97 was extended from Leyton to Stratford City bus station to coincide with the opening of Westfield Stratford City. On 31 August 2013, the route was diverted to serve the new residential precinct around the Queen Elizabeth Olympic Park. Sister route 97A operated from 1981 and 2000 between Chingford and Walthamstow Central with various extensions to Leyton, Hackney and latterly Whipps Cross. It was replaced by route 357.

== Current route ==
Route 97 operates via these primary locations:

- Chingford station
- Chingford Mount
- Walthamstow Market
- Walthamstow Central station
- Bakers Arms
- Leyton Midland Road station
- Leyton station
- Chobham Academy
- Stratford International station
- Stratford City bus station for Stratford station
