= Walthamstow station =

Walthamstow station may refer to

- Walthamstow Central station on the London Underground Victoria Line and the National Rail Chingford Branch
- Walthamstow Queen's Road railway station on the London Overground Gospel Oak to Barking Line
- Wood Street railway station on the National Rail Chingford Branch
- St James Street railway station on the National Rail Chingford Branch
- Walthamstow bus station adjacent to Walthamstow Central station
