= London Buses route 20 =

London bus route

20
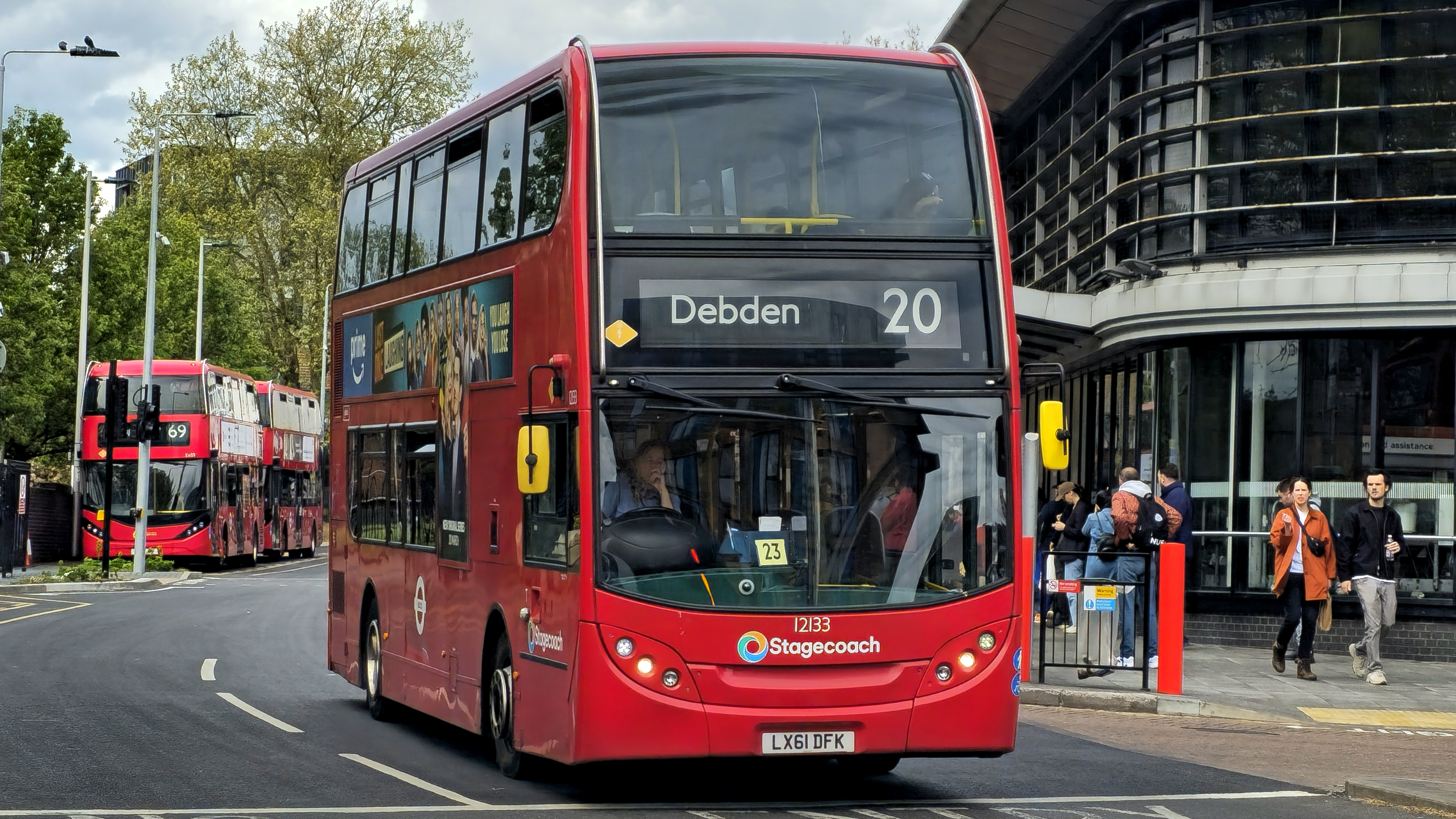
- East London Alexander Dennis Enviro400H at Walthamstow bus station in April 2025

Overview
- Operator: East London (Stagecoach London)
- Garage: Leyton
- Vehicle: Alexander Dennis Enviro400H City
- Peak vehicle requirement: 10

Route
- Start: Debden
- Via: Loughton; Buckhurst Hill; Woodford Green; Whipps Cross; Leyton
- End: Walthamstow bus station
- Length: 10.37 miles (16.69 km)

London Buses route 20 is a Transport for London contracted bus route in London, England. Running between Debden and Walthamstow bus station, it is operated by Stagecoach London subsidiary East London.

== History ==
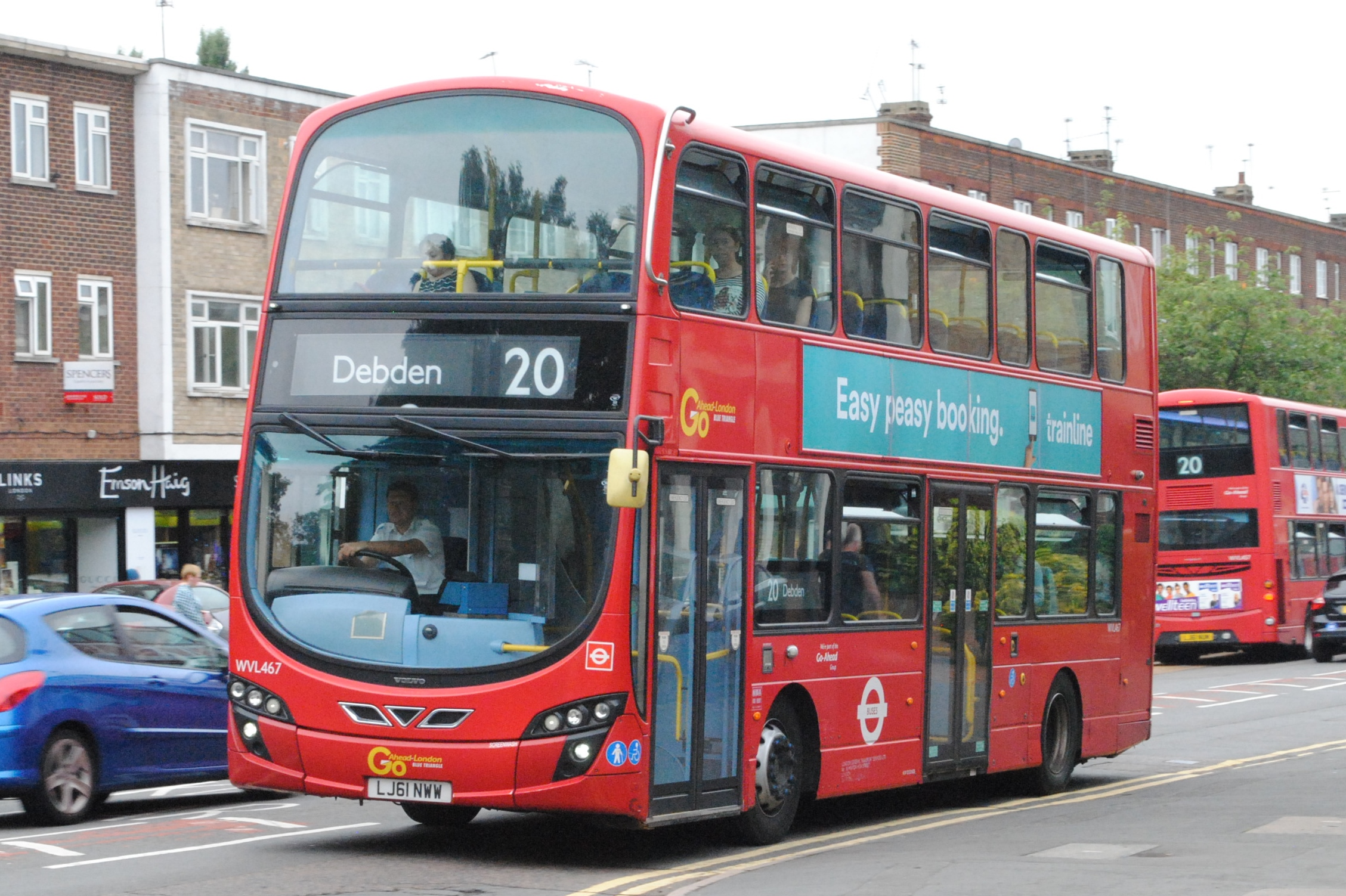
Wright Eclipse Gemini 2 bodied Volvo B9TL in Loughton in September 2016

On 7 March 1992, the route passed to Grey-Green, operating from their Barking garage, following its opening in 1991, using East Lancashire bodied Volvo B10Ms. In 1998, Grey-Green was rebranded as Arriva, and Grey-Green's Barking garage was absorbed into Arriva London, with operation of route 20.

On 26 April 2003, the route was converted to low-floor operation, when new Wright Eclipse Gemini bodied Volvo B7TLs were introduced to the route. When the contract was renewed on 24 March 2007, the route was moved to Edmonton garage and the buses were replaced with older Alexander ALX400 bodied DAF DB250LFs.

The route was operated by Arriva London, following a successful 2006 tender award, until 24 March 2012, when the route was won by Blue Triangle, operating from their Rainham garage with Wright Eclipse Gemini 2 bodied Volvo B9TLs in the next tender awards. It later was transferred to London General, another Go-Ahead London Company.

In November 2015, Essex County Council announced that it would withdraw its subsidy for route 20, as well as for route 167. Concerns were immediately raised from local residents and the headteacher of Davenant Foundation School, who said the routes were used by many schoolchildren.

The route was proposed to have a reduced frequency between 07:00 and 09:00 from 23 March 2019, when the route was passed to CT Plus which operated brand new Alexander Dennis Enviro400H Citys.

On 27 August 2022, route 20 was included in the sale of HCT Group's ‘red bus’ operations to Stagecoach London. It is now operated by Stagecoach's East London subsidiary.

== Current route ==
Route 20 operates via these primary locations:

- Debden
- Loughton High Street
- Loughton station
- Buckhurst Hill
- Woodford Green
- Upper Walthamstow
- Whipps Cross
- Leyton Bakers Arms
- Walthamstow bus station for Walthamstow Central station
