= London Buses route 69 =

London bus route

69
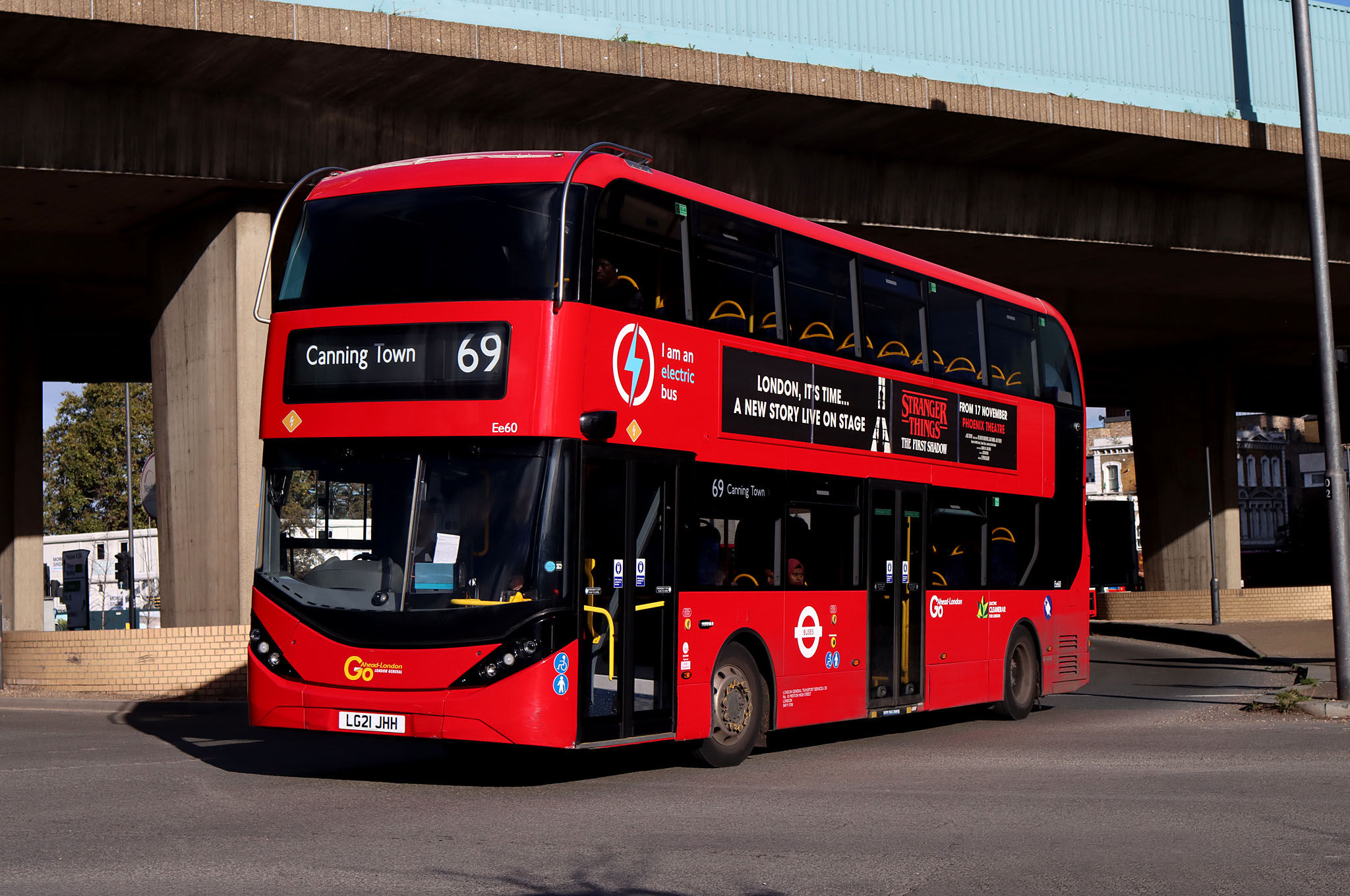
- Blue Triangle BYD Alexander Dennis Enviro400EV in Canning Town in November 2023

Overview
- Operator: Blue Triangle (Go-Ahead London)
- Garage: Henley Road
- Vehicle: BYD Alexander Dennis Enviro400EV

Route
- Start: Canning Town bus station
- Via: Plaistow; Stratford; Leyton
- End: Walthamstow bus station

London Buses route 69 is a Transport for London contracted bus route in London, England. Running between Canning Town and Walthamstow bus stations, it is operated by Go-Ahead London subsidiary Blue Triangle.

== History ==
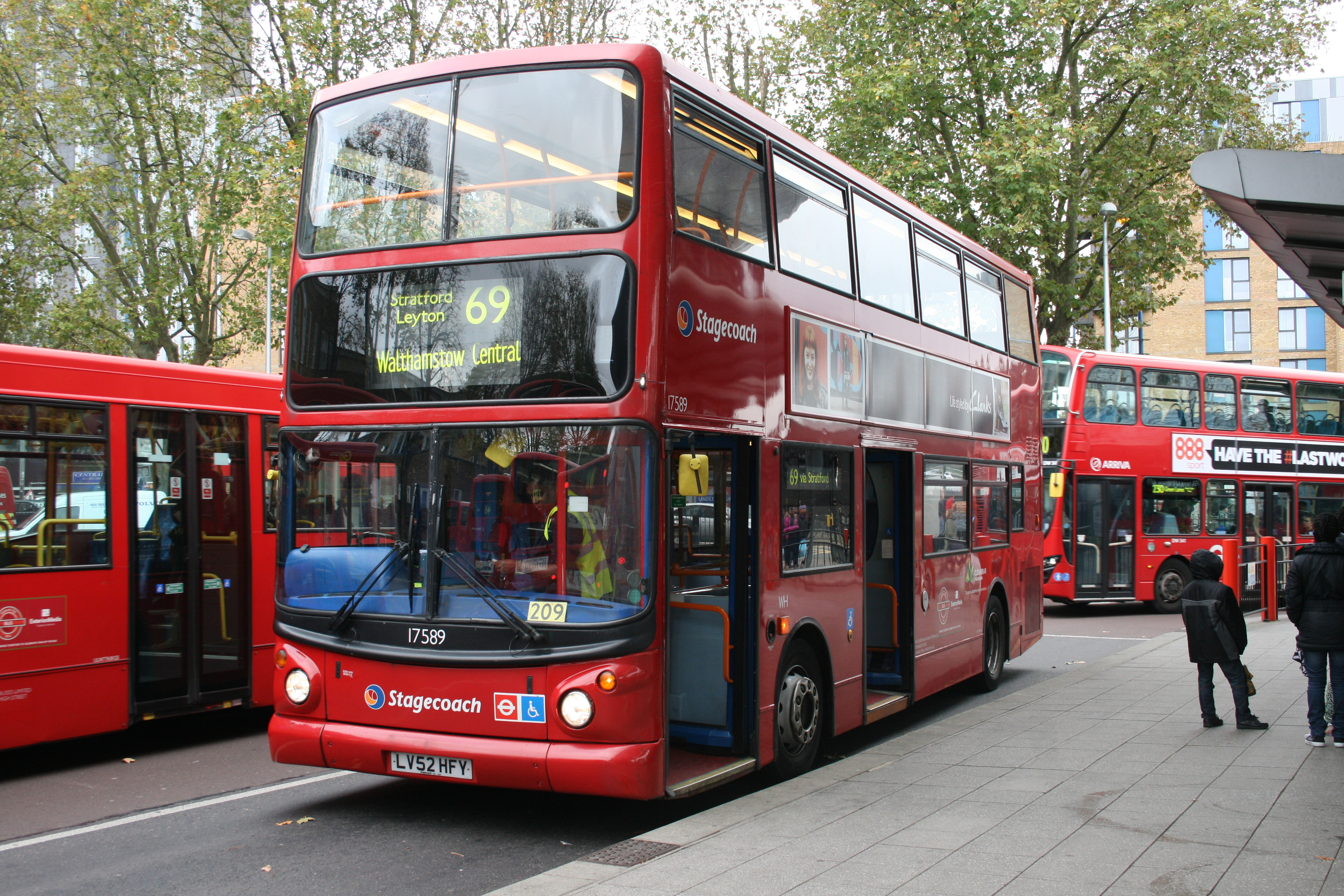
Stagecoach London TransBus ALX400 bodied TransBus Trident at Walthamstow Central station in November 2014

Introduced in February 1960 to replace Trolleybus route 669 Stratford to North Woolwich Ferry, Route 69 was extended in April 1960 from Stratford to Chingford Mount and, as part of London Transport's 'Reshaping' plan in 1968, further extended to Chingford station.

Upon the sale of London Buses' East London subsidiary in 1994, the route passed to Stagecoach, then operating between Walthamstow bus station and North Woolwich.

Upon being re-tendered in 1999, it was retained by Stagecoach London with a new southern terminus, London City Airport. The North Woolwich section being covered by new route 474. The contract was again renewed, as a 24-hour service, commencing on 30 April 2004.

On 17 December 2005, it was withdrawn between London City Airport and Canning Town station as part of a series of changes in connection with the Docklands Light Railway being extended. Stagecoach London commenced a further contract on 30 April 2011. In October 2015, three Alexander Dennis Enviro400VE MMCs with inductive wireless charging technology, which allows its batteries to receive a charging boost when stationary at specially equipped bus stops entered service on route 69.

When next tendered, it was awarded to Tower Transit. The new contract commenced on 6 February.

In 2012, vandals damaged a bus by setting it on fire. The bus, Spirit of London, was a tribute to the victims of the 2005 London bombings. The police later arrested some teenagers.

The route transferred from Tower Transit to Go-Ahead London on 1 May 2021.

== Current route ==
Route 69 operates via these primary locations:

- Canning Town bus station
- Plaistow station
- Stratford bus station
- Maryland station
- Leyton station
- Leyton Midland Road station
- Leyton Bakers Arms
- Walthamstow bus station
