= Shern Hall Street railway station =

Former railway station in England

Coordinates: 51.585025°N 0.007794°W

Shern Hall Street, Walthamstow
- Location of Shern Hall Street, Walthamstow in Greater London
- Location: Walthamstow
- Owner: Great Eastern Railway
- Number of platforms: 1

Key dates
- 1870: Opened
- 1873: Closed
- Replaced by: Wood Street, Walthamstow

Other information

Shern Hall Street was a railway station on the Chingford branch line located in Walthamstow.

The station was opened on 26 April 1870 as the terminus of a new single-track branch line from Lea Bridge junction on the Northern and Eastern Railway's original line from Stratford. This section is today referred to as the Temple Mills branch. The station had a short operational life and was closed on 17 November 1873 when the line was extended northwards to Chingford with a new station opening at Wood Street to the east as its replacement. This is now the Weaver route on the Overground.

Preceding station	Disused railways	Following station
Hoe Street Walthamstow	Great Eastern Railway (1870-1873)	Terminus
