= London Buses route 252 =

London bus route

252
- Thameside Alexander Dennis Enviro400 MMC at Romford station in September 2026

Overview
- Operator: Thameside (Stagecoach London)
- Garage: Rainham
- Vehicle: Alexander Dennis Enviro400

Route
- Start: Collier Row
- Via: Romford; Elm Park
- End: Hornchurch
- Length: 9 miles (14 km)

Service
- Level: Daily
- Frequency: About every 10 minutes

London Buses route 252 is a Transport for London contracted bus route in London, England. Running between Collier Row and Hornchurch, it is operated by Stagecoach London subsidiary Thameside.

== History ==
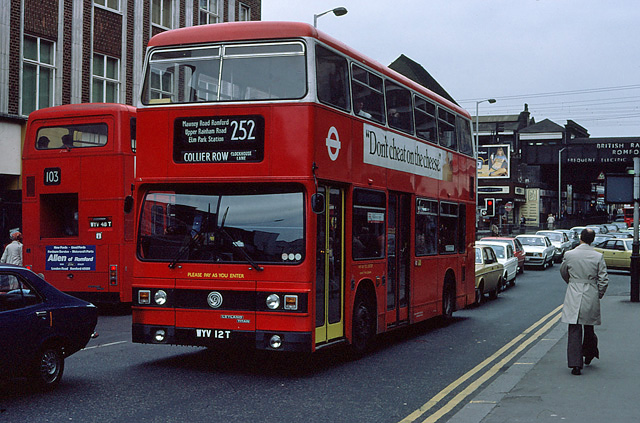
Leyland Titan in Romford in April 1980

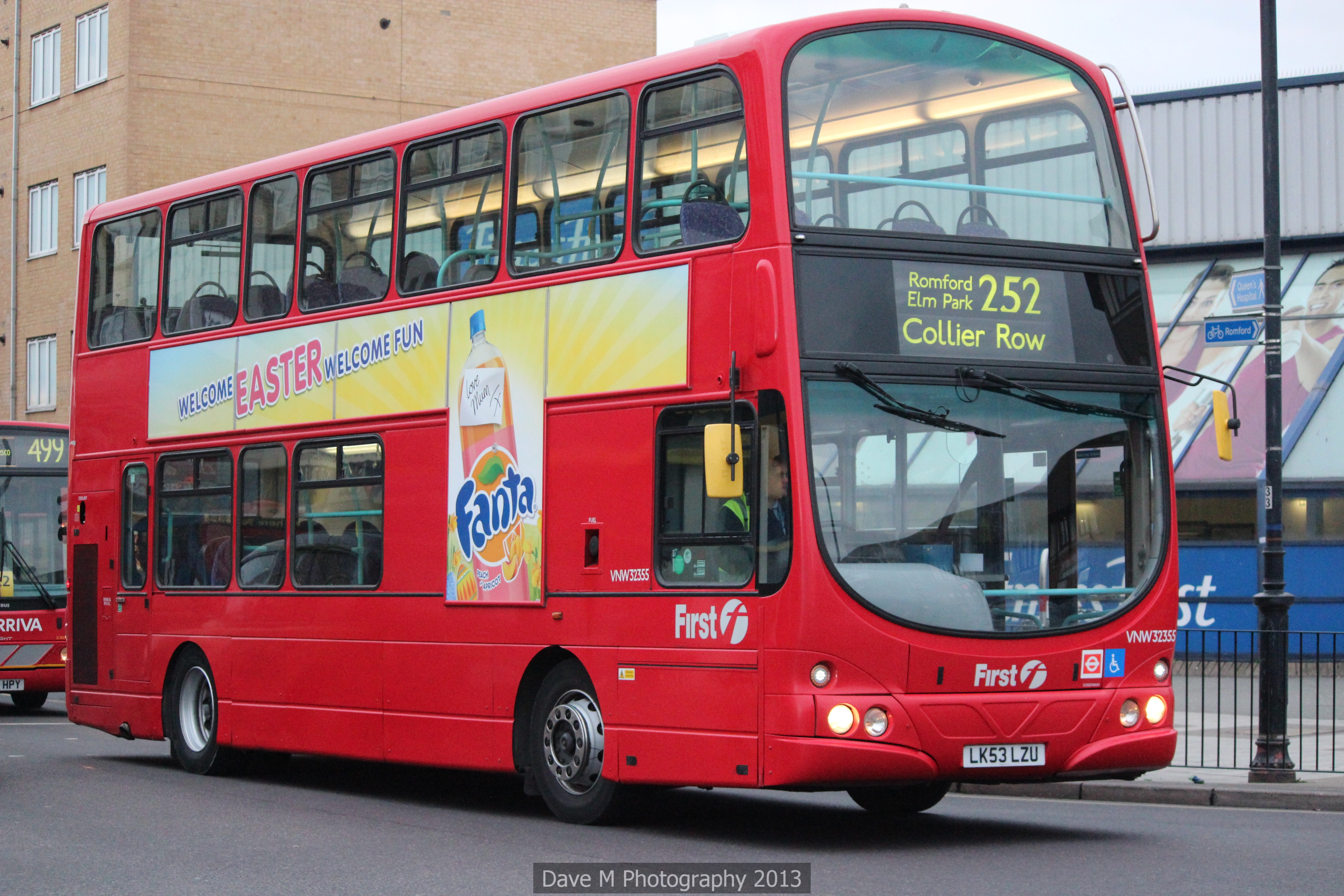
First London Wright Eclipse Gemini bodied Volvo B7TL in Romford in March 2013

Route 252 originally operated within Romford. On 8 January 1958, it was extended to Collier Row and converted to double deck operation with AEC Regent III RTs. From 26 November 1958 it was extended to Hornchurch.

On 13 March 1971, it was converted back to single deck operation with AEC Merlins, on 1 March 1975 double deckers returned in the form of Daimler Fleetlines.

It again became a single deck operation on 28 November 1981 with Leyland Nationals introduced. On 21 June 1986 the route was extended from Hornchurch to Gidea Park station.

Upon being put up for tender, it passed to Frontrunner South East on 3 September 1988. Route 252 was included in the sale of the business to Ensignbus, which in turn sold the business to Capital Citybus on 29 September 1990. From 14 September 1991, the route was withdrawn between Hornchurch and Gidea Park.

Route 252 was included in the 8 July 1998 sale of Capital Citybus to First London.

Upon being re-tendered, the route was retained by First London with a new contract commencing on 27 September 2008. When next tendered, the route passed to Thameside's Rainham garage on 29 September 2013.

== Current route ==
Route 252 operates via these primary locations:

- Collier Row
- Romford Market
- Romford station
- Elm Park station
- Hornchurch Country Park
- Hornchurch station
- Hornchurch town centre
