= London Buses route 55 =

London bus route

55
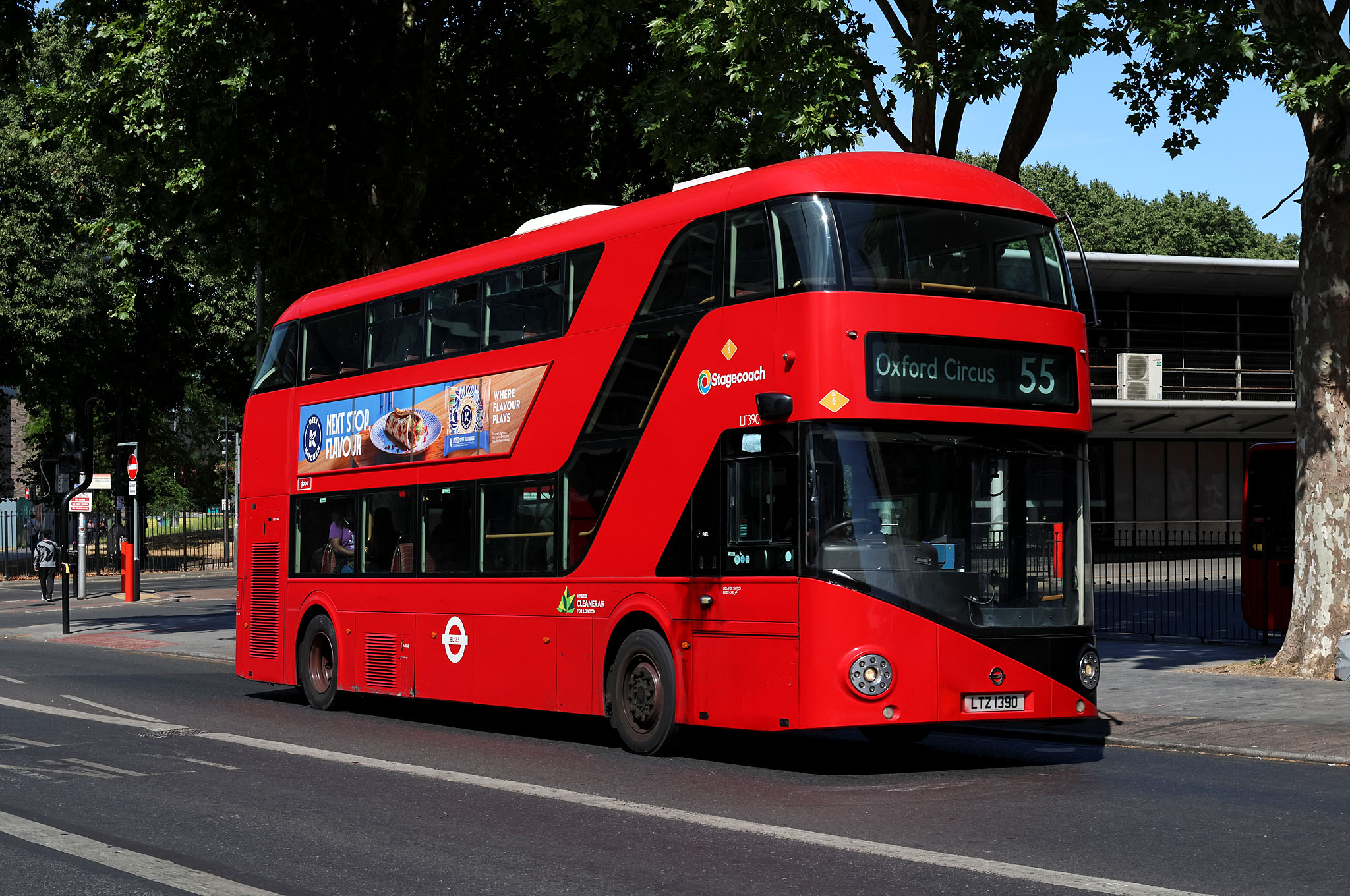
- East London New Routemaster in Walthamstow in July 2026

Overview
- Operator: East London (Stagecoach London)
- Garage: Leyton
- Vehicle: New Routemaster
- Peak vehicle requirement: 34
- Night-time: Night Bus N55

Route
- Start: Walthamstow bus station
- Via: Leyton; Hackney Central; Cambridge Heath; Shoreditch; Clerkenwell; Holborn
- End: Oxford Circus station

London Buses route 55 is a Transport for London contracted bus route in London, England. Running between Walthamstow bus station and Oxford Circus station, it is operated by Stagecoach London subsidiary East London.

== History ==
East London Alexander ALX400 bodied Dennis Trident 2

The route number 55 came from tram 55, replaced by trolleybus 555, which had run between Old Street and Hackney.

In 1990, the section of the route that linked Leyton and Oxford Circus was withdrawn. It was reinstated in 1997 after a campaign by Waltham Forest residents.

On 13 October 2001 conductors were reintroduced on route 55, using standard two door double deckers that were previously one person operated. The vehicles employed generally had bell pushes that would only ding once reducing the effectiveness of the second crew member. The trial was short lived and not extended to other routes.

Stagecoach London successfully retained route 55 with a new contract starting on 27 February 2010 and a further contract starting on 28 February 2015.

New Routemasters were introduced on 28 February 2015. The rear platform remains closed at all times except for when the bus is at bus stops. On 12 October 2019, route 55 was extended to Walthamstow bus station after the withdrawal of route 48.

In 2021, the maximum frequency of the service was reduced from 11 buses per hour to 9.

== Current route ==
Route 55 operates via these primary locations:

- Walthamstow bus station for Walthamstow Central station
- Leyton Bakers Arms
- Lea Bridge station
- Clapton Pond
- Hackney Downs station
- Hackney Central station
- Cambridge Heath station
- Hoxton station
- Old Street station
- Clerkenwell
- Holborn Bloomsbury Square
- Tottenham Court Road station
- Oxford Circus station
