= Bakers Arms =

Coordinates: 51.575523°N 0.012596°W

- Location within Greater London
- Ceremonial county: Greater London
- Region: London
- Country: England
- Sovereign state: United Kingdom
- Post town: LONDON
- Postcode district: E10/E17
- Dialling code: 020
- Police: Metropolitan
- Fire: London
- Ambulance: London
- UK Parliament: Walthamstow

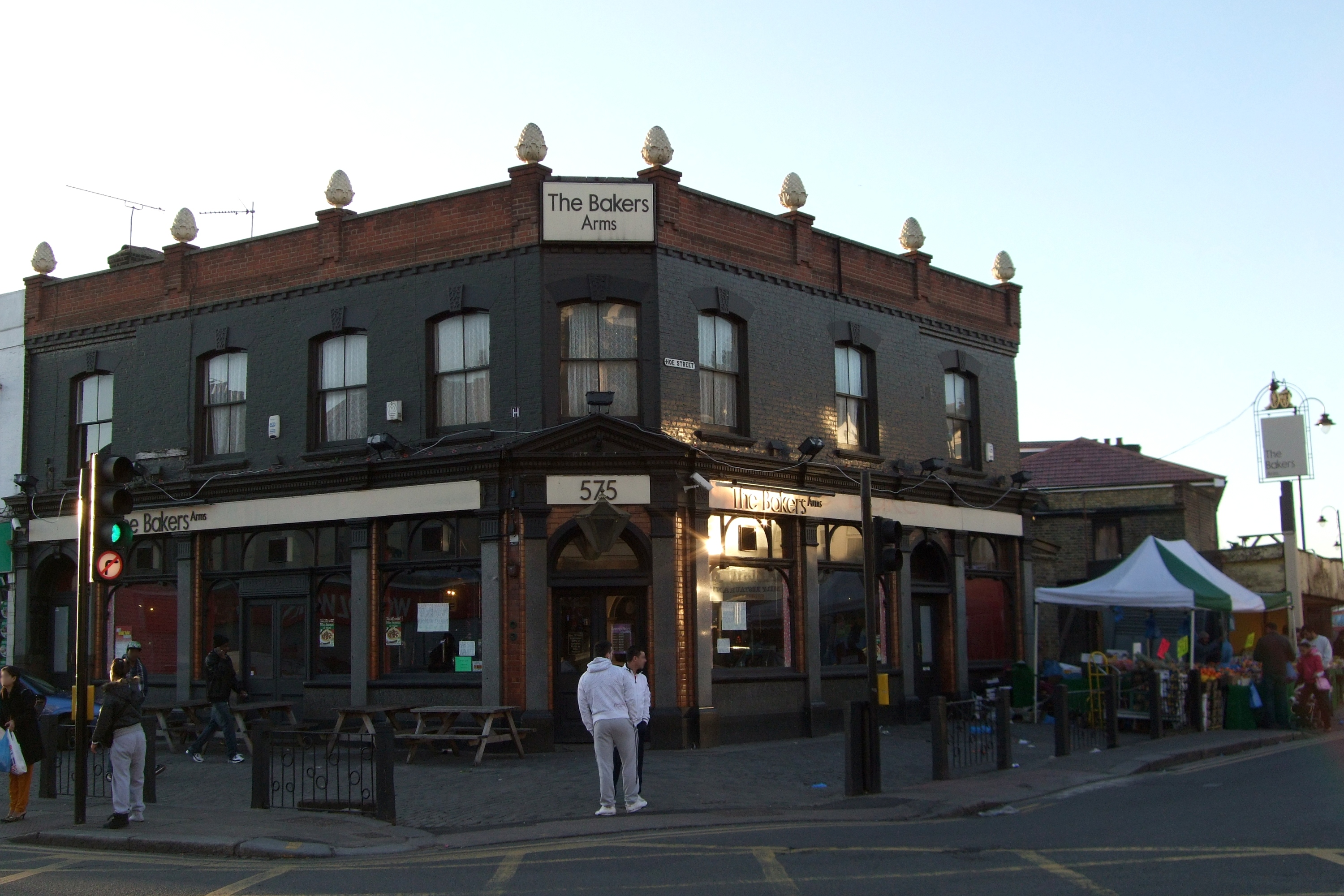
The former Baker's Arms Pub

Bakers Arms is an intersection and arguably a district on the boundary of Leyton and Walthamstow, in the London Borough of Waltham Forest. It is named after a former public house which stood at the junction of High Road Leyton, Hoe Street (both A112) and Lea Bridge Road (A104). The pub's name was derived from the nearby almshouses for members of London's baking trade, which were completed in 1866. The first record of a publican at the Baker's Arms was in 1868. The pub closed in 2010, and the premises now operate as a betting shop. There are several food stores, pubs and cafes, and a variety of other retail outlets.

== Transport ==
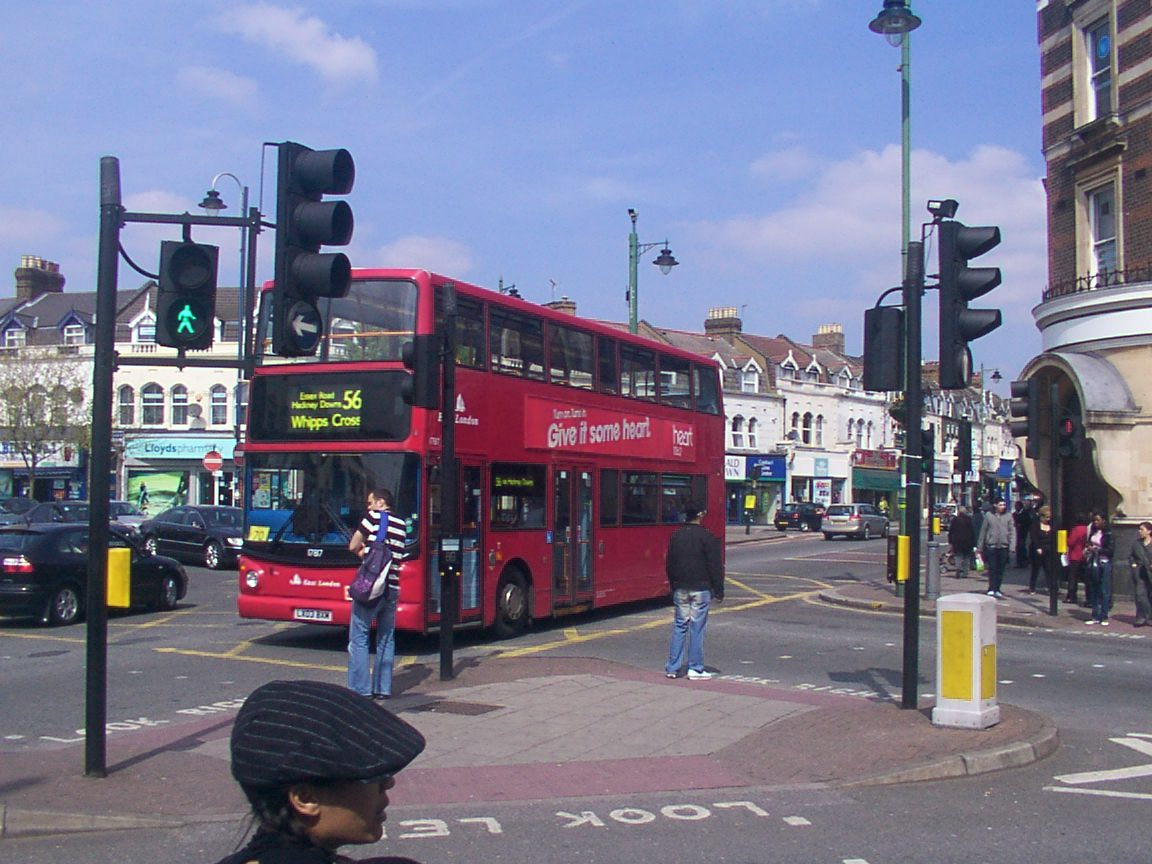
A number 56 bus, apparently going the wrong way, negotiates the busy junction at Baker's Arms in 2010.

Bakers Arms is a hub on the London Bus network. Bus routes passing through the junction are 20, 55, 56, 69, 97, 230, 257, 357, N26, N38, N55, W15, W16 and W19. The closest railway station is Leyton Midland Road on the Gospel Oak to Barking line.

== The Bakers' Almshouses ==
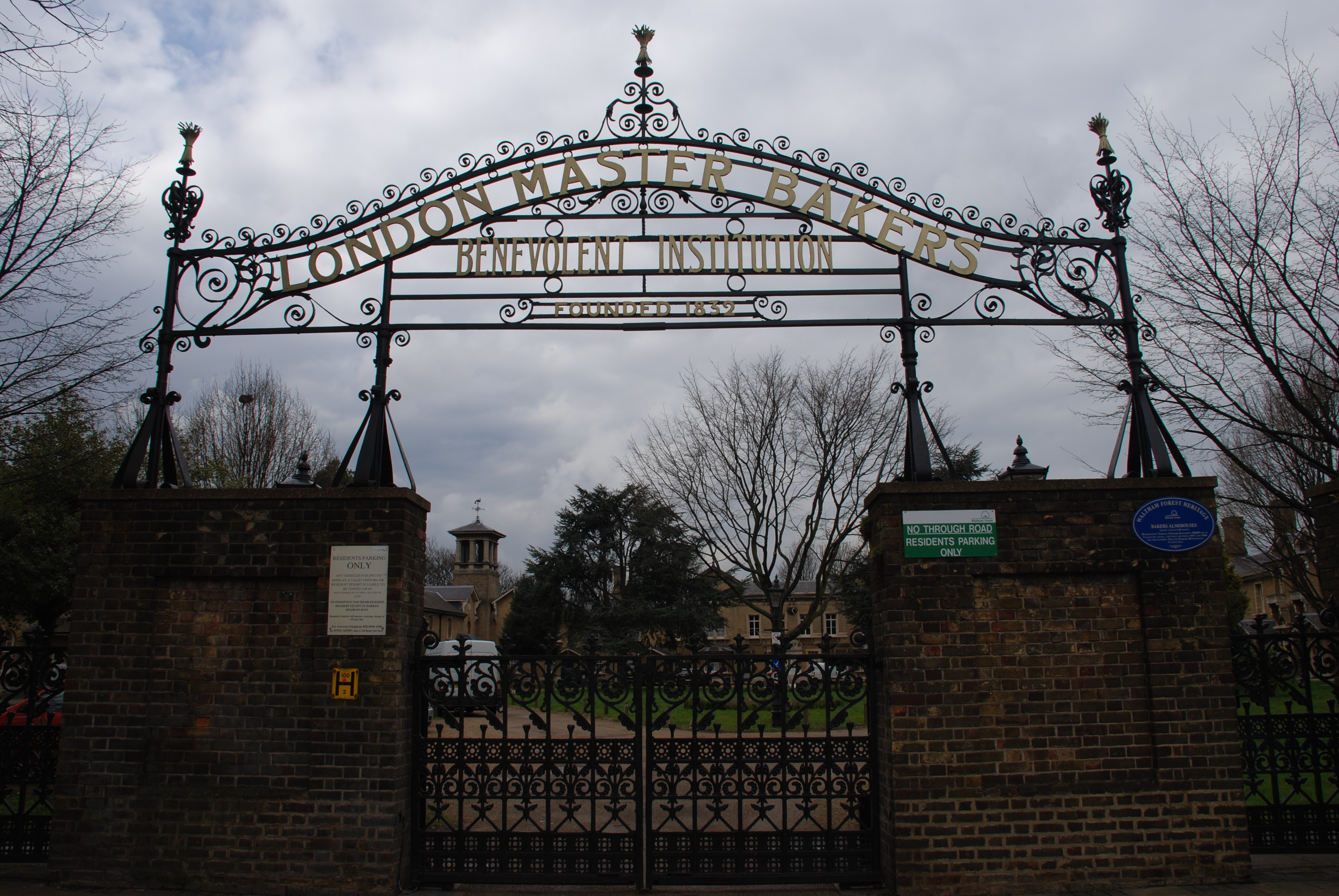
Gates to the London Master Bakers' Benevolent Institution almshouses

The Bakers Arms pub was itself named after the almshouses approximately 100 yards further south in Lea Bridge Road. They were built between 1857 and 1866 by the Master Bakers' Benevolent Institution (now the Bakers' Benevolent Society) for "any respectable member of the baking trade fallen into poverty, eligible according to the rules, or to the widow of such". The 52 almshouses were built on three sides of a square, with turrets at the angles, in the Italianate style by the architect Thomas Edward Knightley. On 24 September 1916, twenty two of the flats were damaged by bombs dropped by the German Navy Zeppelin L31. In the late 1960s, the almshouses were compulsorily purchased by the Greater London Council for a road widening scheme. The last retired baker moved to new accommodation in Bakers Lane, Epping in 1971. However, the almshouses were saved from demolition because of their architectural merit and were given a Grade II Listed Building status. The buildings were subsequently purchased by Waltham Forest Council and refurbished as residential flats.
