= Walthamstow bus station =

Bus station in London, England

Coordinates: 51.5838°N 0.0204°W

Walthamstow Bus Station
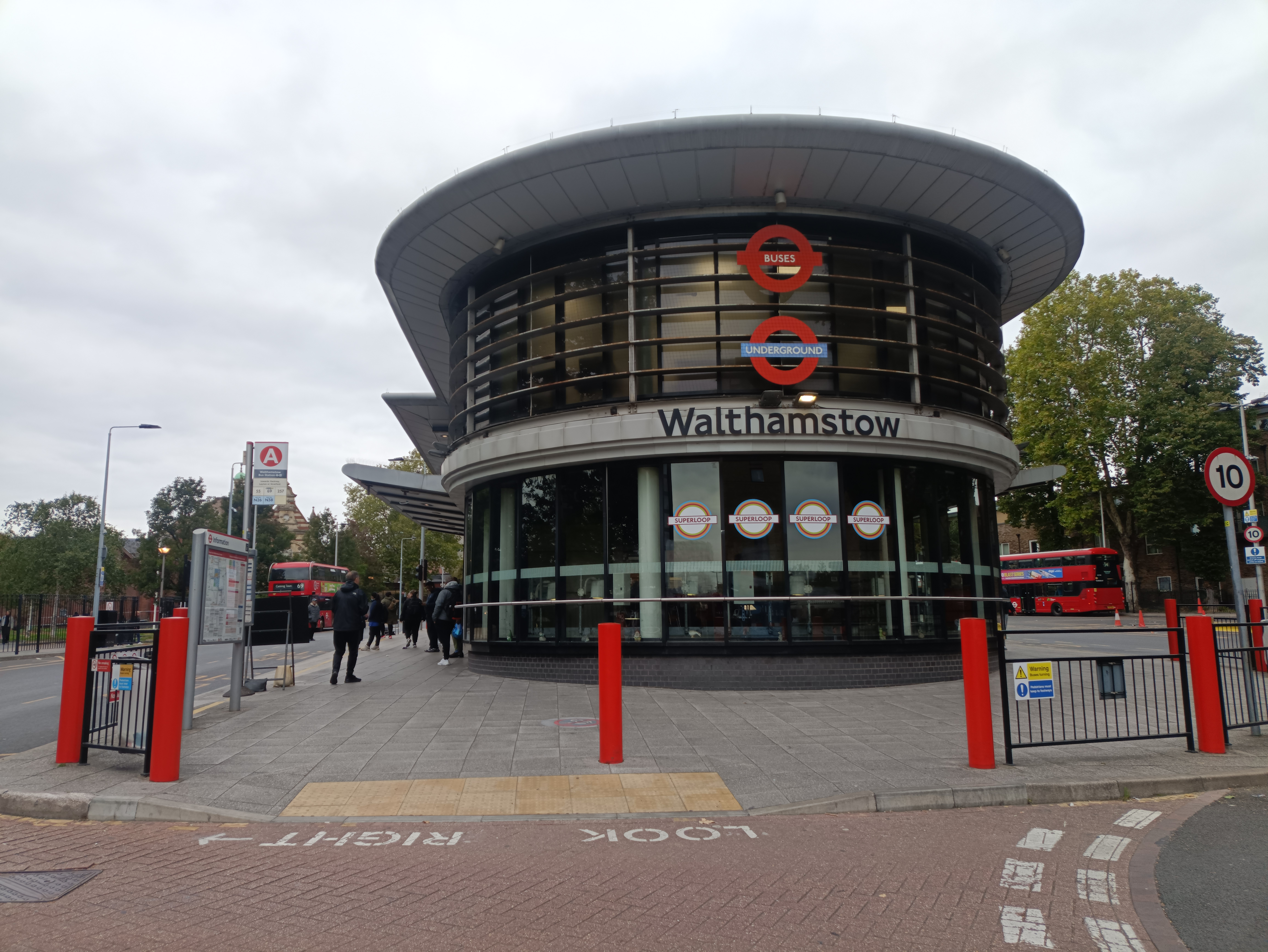

General information
- Location: Walthamstow; Waltham Forest
- Operator: Transport for London
- Bus routes: 20, 34, 55, 58, 69, 212, 215, 230, 257, 275, 675, N26, N38, N73, SL1, SL2, W11, W12, W15 and W19
- Bus stands: 6
- Bus operators: Arriva London, Stagecoach London, Blue Triangle, London General
- Connections: Adjacent to Walthamstow Central station

History
- Opened: 19 June 2004; 22 years ago
Location

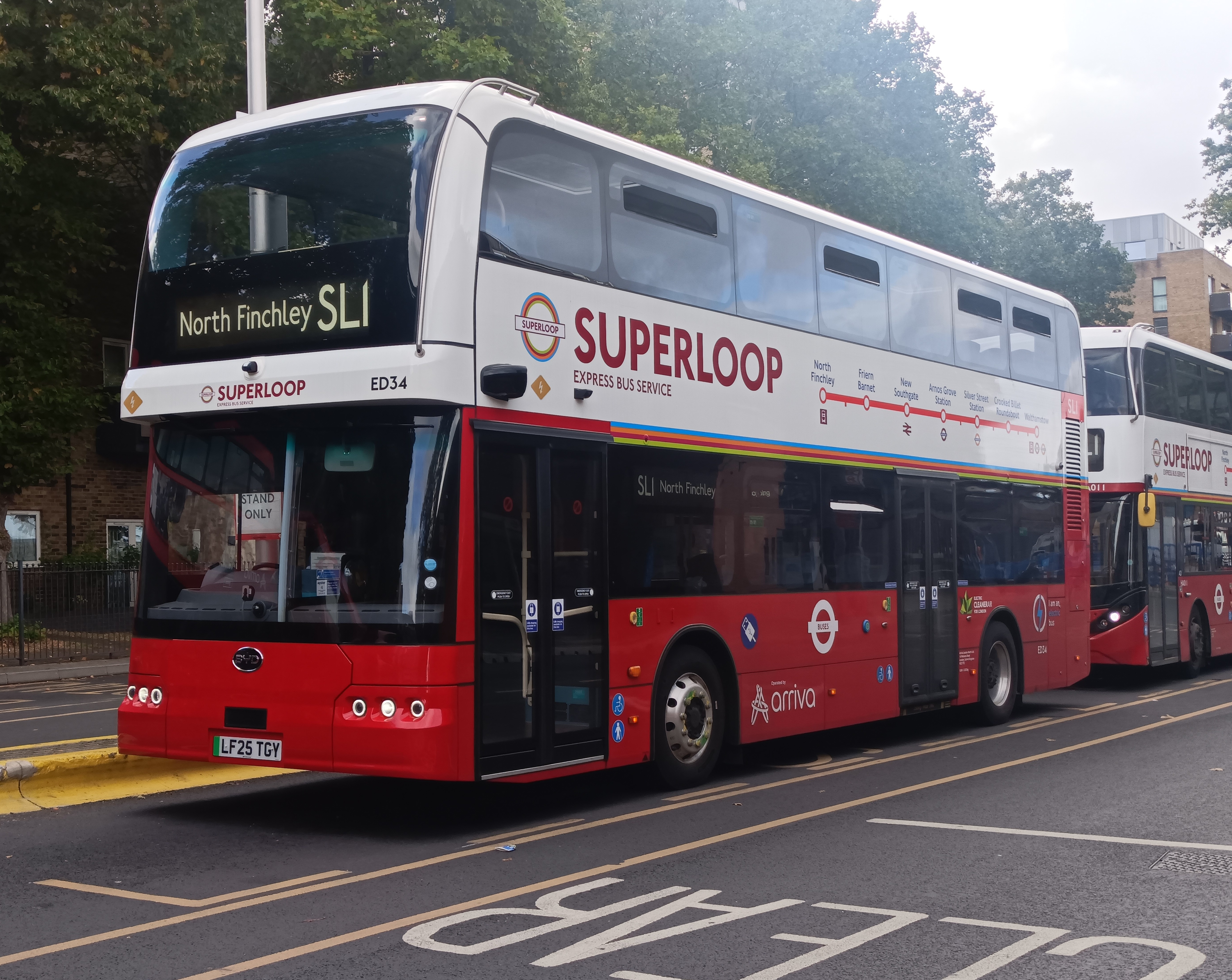
A route SL1 bus operated by Arriva London standing

Walthamstow Bus Station serves Walthamstow town centre in Waltham Forest, London, England. The station is owned and maintained by Transport for London. The station can be accessed from both Selborne Road and High Street as well as Walthamstow Central tube station. Sixteen bus routes serve the station, with three night bus routes also serving the station.

== History ==
A bus station has served Walthamstow Central station since at least the 1970s.

In the early 2000s, the bus station was rebuilt, increasing the number of bus stands to accommodate all bus routes that serve the station and improving the interchange between the tube and rail stations at Walthamstow Central. Designed by RPS Group, it reopened in June 2004. In 2007, a subway under Selborne Road opened, linking the bus station with a new Victoria line ticket office.

In 2004, the bus station was the third-busiest in the capital, with 2,500 buses passing through the station each day serving 16.8 million passengers a year.

As part of masterplanning for Walthamstow town centre, consultants proposed in 2011 that the bus station be demolished, and the area converted into a park. The stops would be relocated to streets nearby. This relocation was not proceeded with.

== See also ==
- List of bus and coach stations in London
