= East London (bus company) =

Bus operator in East London, England

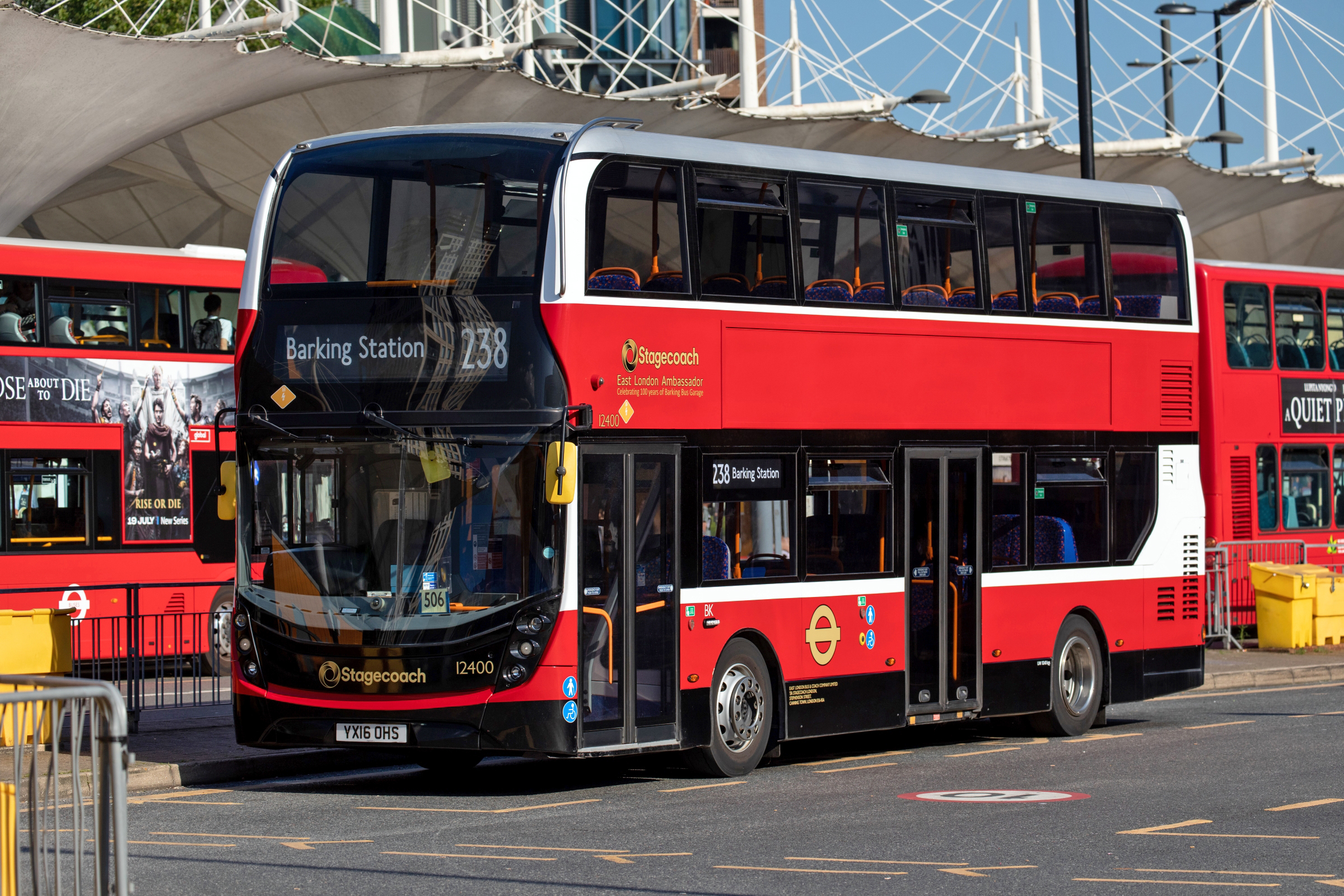
- 12400, the flagship East London Ambassador, an Alexander Dennis Enviro400H MMC, at Stratford bus station in July 2024
- Parent: Stagecoach London
- Founded: 1 April 1989; 37 years ago
- Headquarters: West Ham
- Service area: Central London; East London
- Service type: Bus services
- Hubs: Barking; Bow; Canning Town; Ilford; Leyton; Romford; Stratford; Walthamstow
- Depots: 7
- Website: Official website

East London is a bus operator brand under East London Bus & Coach Company Limited, trading as Stagecoach London. East London is a bus company operating in East London and parts of Essex. The brand is a subsidiary of Stagecoach London and operates services under contract to Transport for London from seven garages.

== History ==
On 1 April 1989, London Buses was divided into 11 separate business units, one of which was East London. In 1994, East London was sold to Stagecoach Holdings at the same time as fellow subsidiary Selkent for £42 million (equivalent to £88,619,000 in 2025), with operations subsequently rebranded to Stagecoach East London. In November 2000, in line with the rebranding of the wider Stagecoach Group, Stagecoach East London and Selkent were consolidated under the Stagecoach London brand.

In August 2006, Stagecoach sold its London bus operations to Macquarie Bank for £264 million (equivalent to £456,239,000 in 2025). The new owner restored the East London name and Thames sailing barge logo, forming the East London Bus Group (ELBG). When the ELBG acquired the tender to operate route 248 in March 2008, a new operating subsidiary named 'Thameside' was formed out of the reopened Rainham bus garage, with buses featuring a logo depicting a white outline of the River Thames.

In October 2010, Stagecoach reacquired its old London operations for a reduced sum of £53 million (equivalent to £81,871,000 in 2025), with East London once again rebranded as Stagecoach London. In August 2022, East London purchased buses from HCT Group that the social enterprise carried out on behalf of Transport for London. The deal saw around 500 members of staff and 160 buses transfer, along with leases on depots at Ash Grove and Walthamstow.

== Livery ==
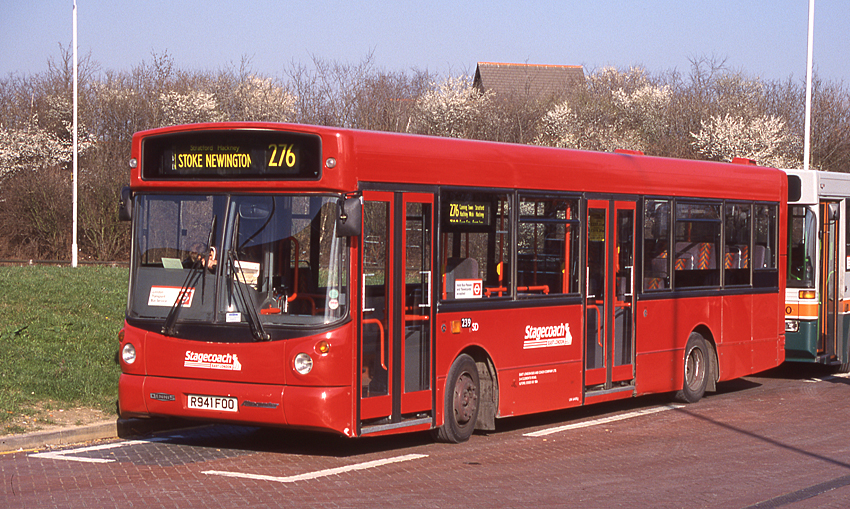
Dennis Dart SLF with Stagecoach East London branding at Beckton in 1999

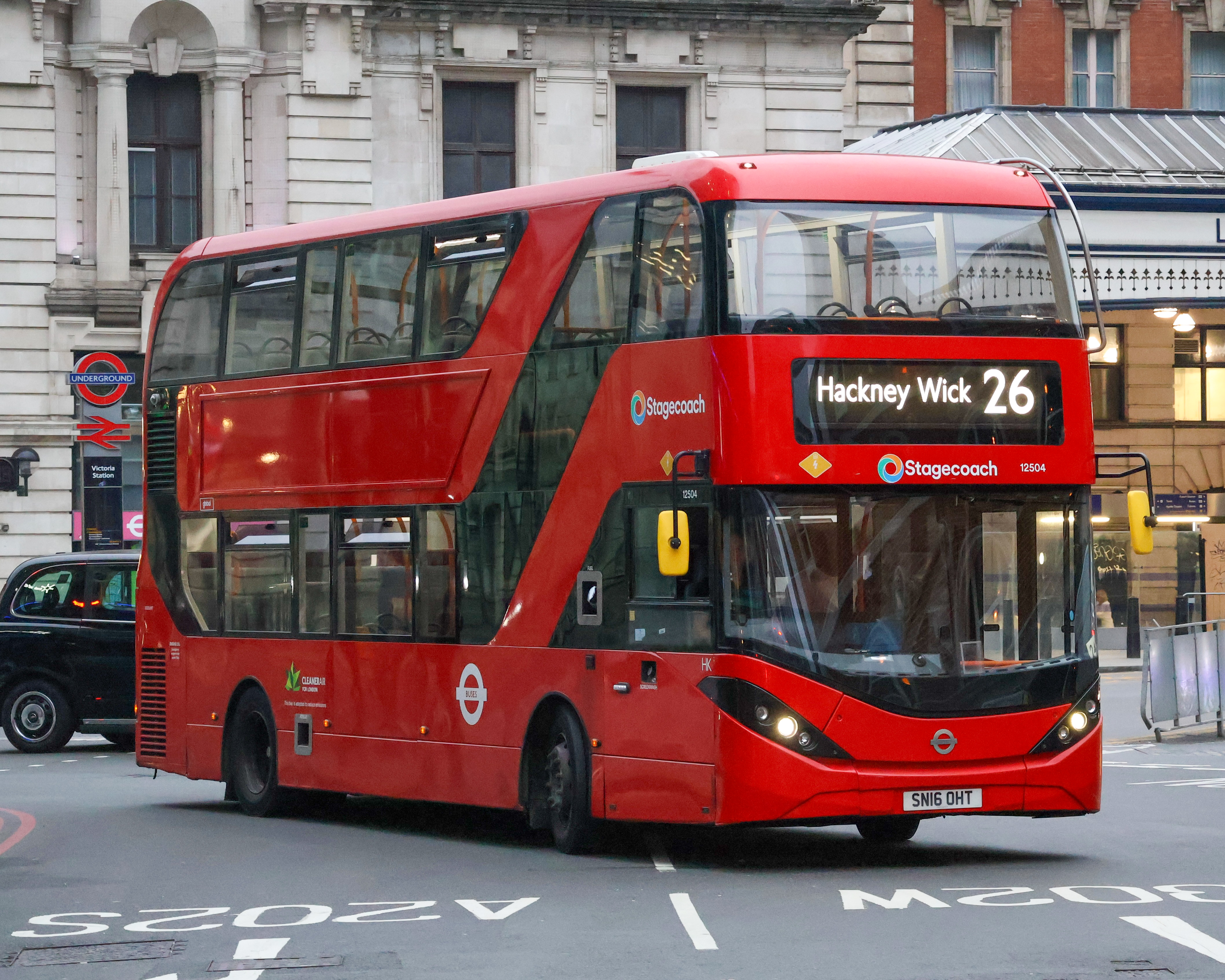
Alexander Dennis Enviro400H City with current livery in June 2025

When privatised, East London had a standard London Buses red livery with a grey skirt, though a fleet of dual-door Optare Deltas delivered to the company in 1992 wore a silver and red livery. Following privatisation, Selkent adopted an all-red livery with white Stagecoach East London fleetnames. This was replaced by a new standard bus livery of a dark blue skirt and orange and light blue swirl at the rear, with Stagecoach's standard off-white replaced by red to conform with Transport for London contractual requirements for buses on TfL services to be 80% red. While the company was owned by Macquarie Bank, an all-red livery was introduced, which was retained by Stagecoach to remain compliant with updated TfL livery regulations.

== Garages ==
East London operates seven bus garages.

=== Ash Grove (HK) ===
Ash Grove garage operates routes 26, 242, 277, 309, 310, 388, 394, D6, D7, N26, N242, N277 and N550.

=== Barking (BK) ===
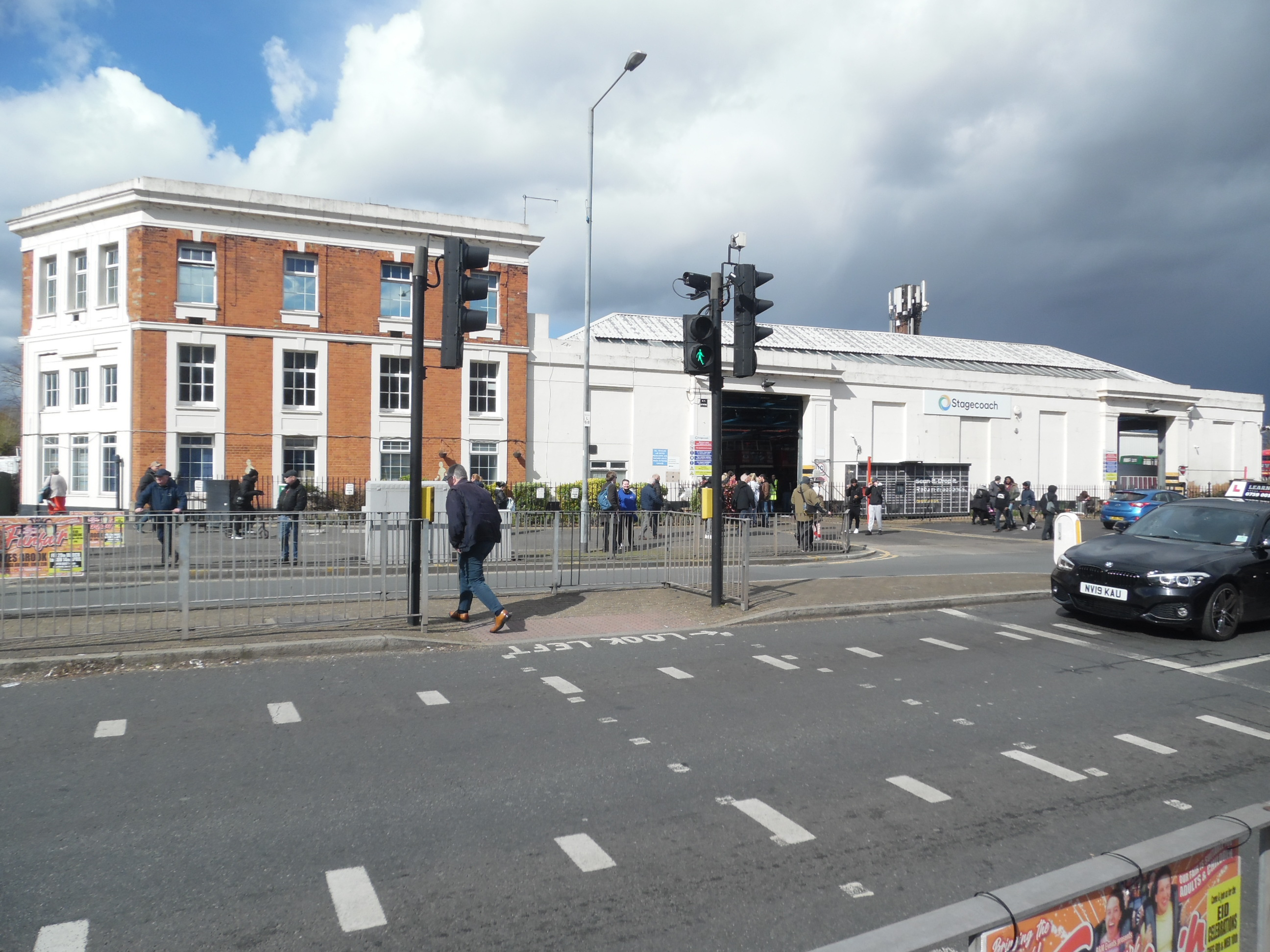
Barking bus garage as viewed from Longbridge Road, March 2024

Barking garage operates routes 62, 145, 167, 169, 173, 179, 238, 362, 462, 667 and N551.

Barking garage was opened in 1924 by the London General Omnibus Company to cater for the increased demand from the new housing estates springing up in Becontree. Barking was the last London Transport garage to operate AEC Regent III RT buses in revenue-earning service, the type being withdrawn following a final running day on route 62 on 7 April 1979.

In 1992, it was intended to close this garage, along with those at North Street (Romford) and Seven Kings, in favour of a new 6 acres (2.4 ha) garage and company headquarters for East London at Chadwell Heath. However, the Chadwell Heath complex was not built due to the land for it being contaminated, resulting in only Seven Kings garage closing. Thus, by 1994, Barking found itself with a scheduled requirement for 109 buses, mainly Titans and Optare Deltas.

=== Bow (BW) ===
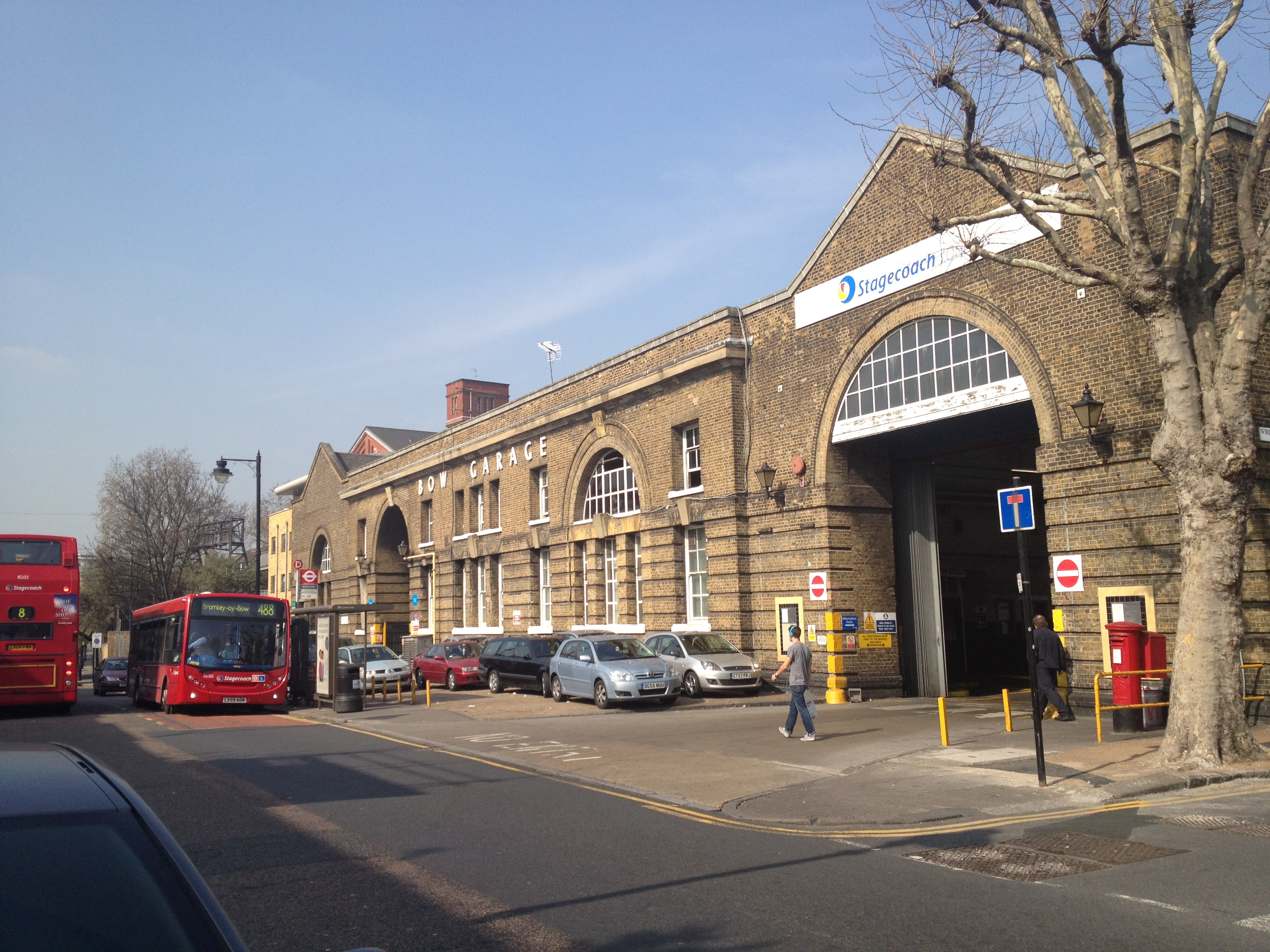
The front facade of Bow Garage, showing the two great arches which are used on an "in" and "out" basis for access

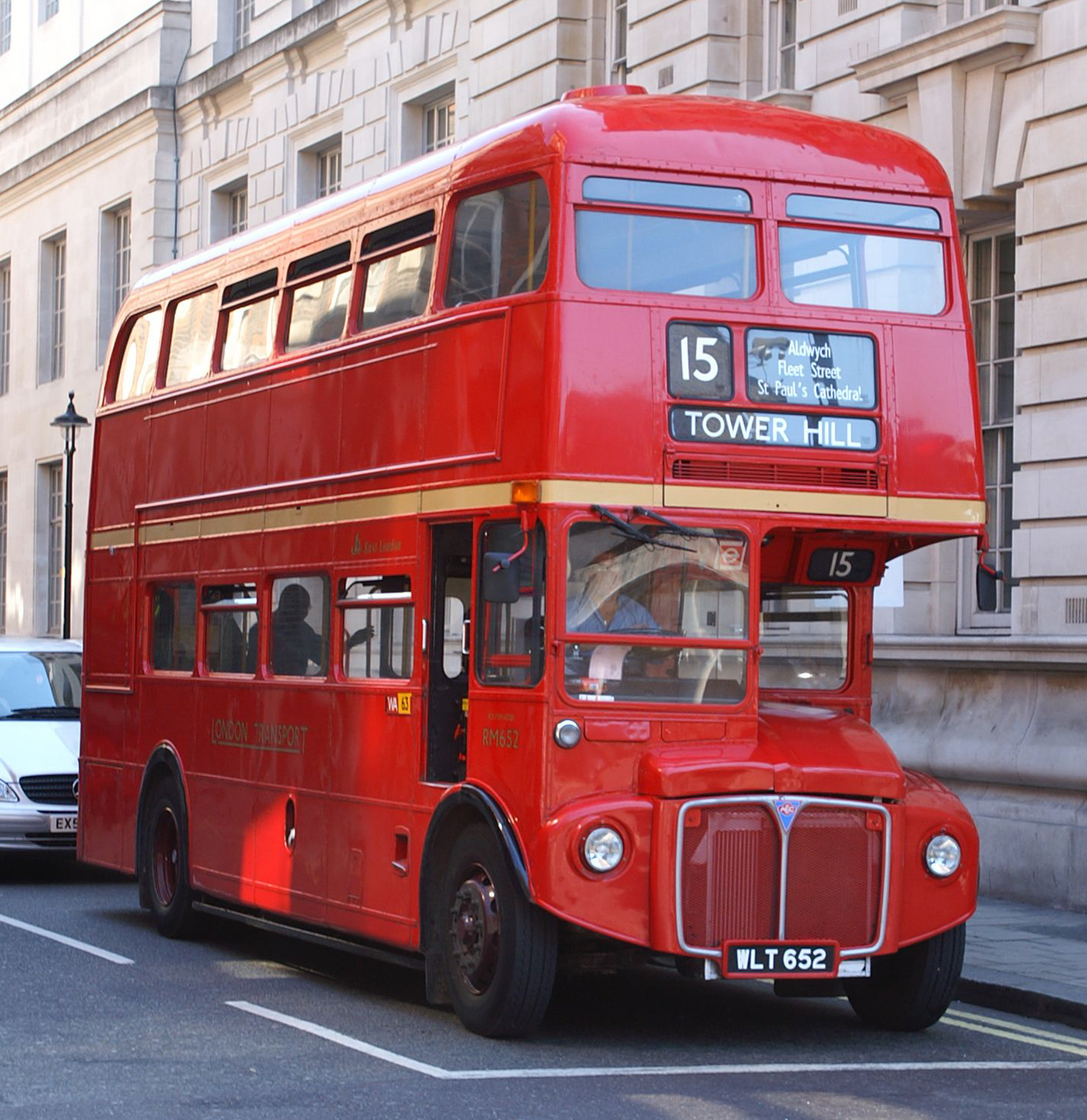
AEC Routemaster on route 15H on Whitehall in August 2007

Bow garage operates routes 8, 25, 205, 425, N8, N25 and N205.

Opened as a tram depot by the north Metropolitan Tramways Company in 1908 on land once occupied by an asylum, it was converted to operate trolley buses in 1939. It was converted to motor bus operation in 1959 including the installation of large overground fuel tanks. Shortly after its conversion, it took up the allocation of the nearby Clay Hall garage when that closed.

The garage has had a long association with the AEC Routemaster, receiving its first examples in the early 1960s, some of which remained right up until August 2004 when the type was withdrawn from route 8. In December 2007, Bow took over the running of route 15H from the closed Waterden Road garage until this moved to West Ham in June 2009.

=== Leyton (T) ===
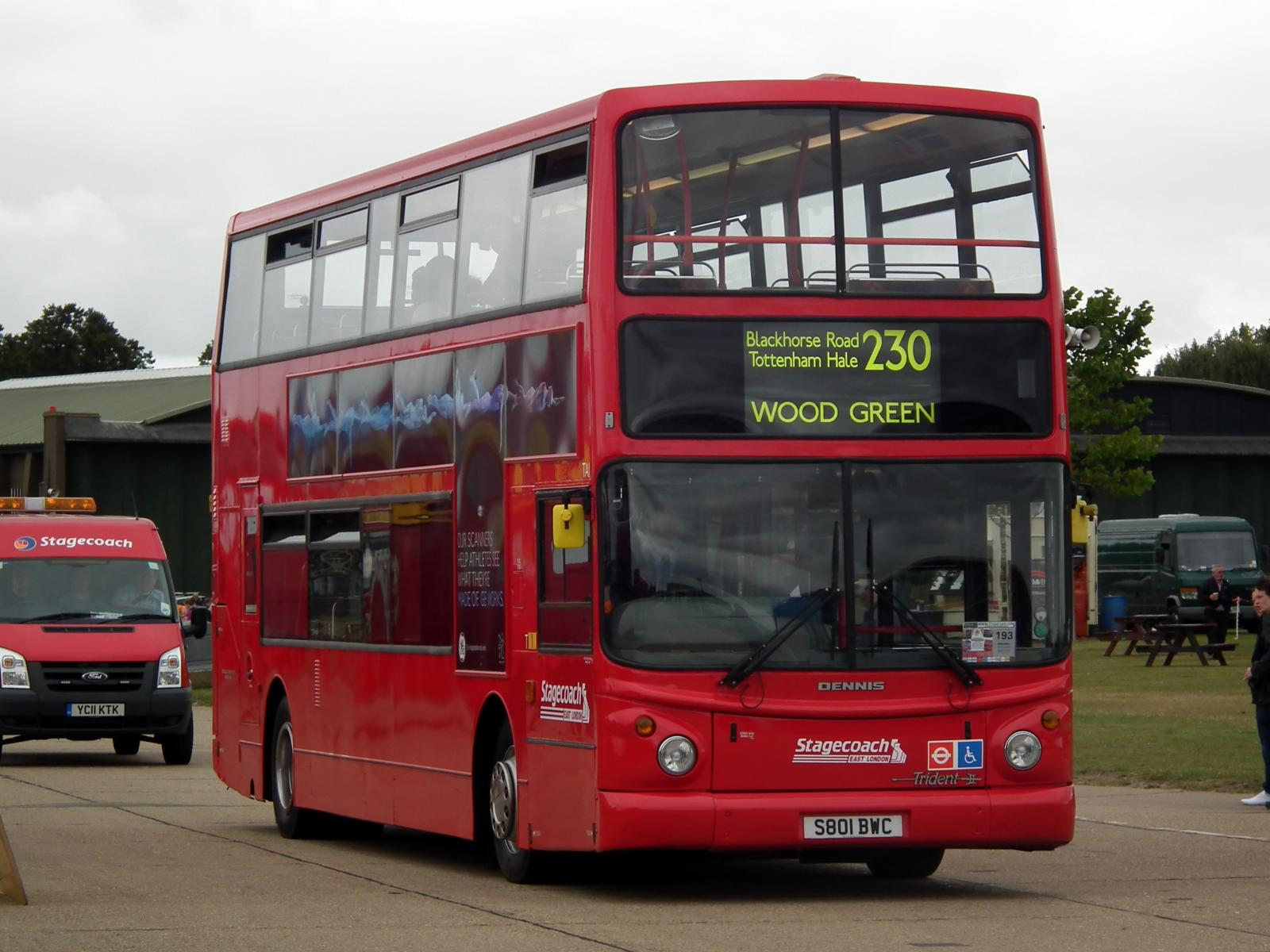
The Stagecoach Group's first Alexander ALX400 bodied Dennis Trident 2 was delivered to Leyton garage in 1999

Leyton garage operates routes 20, 55, 56, 215, 257, 275, 657 and N55.

Leyton garage was built in 1912 by the London General Omnibus Company to replace an existing garage acquired from London Metropolitan, and was in an ideal position to benefit from developing areas. During the Second World War, the garage suffered bomb damage but was not rebuilt until a major renovation in 1955.

The garage was the first to receive post-war AEC Regent III RTs, 78 of which were allocated by 1947, with a further 30 added for the trolleybus conversion program in 1959. RT operation at Leyton ended in 1972.

When the London Buses subsidiaries were established on 1 April 1989, Leyton was taken up by the London Forest subsidiary. In 1991, plans to close the garage were a contributing factor in strike action by all of the company's staff, which ultimately resulted in the closure of London Forest and the transfer of Leyton garage to East London on 23 October 1991, preventing the garage's closure.

Leyton was the first garage for another bus type in May 1999 when Stagecoach began taking delivery of an order of over 100 low-floor Alexander ALX400 bodied Dennis Trident 2s, 62 of which were allocated to the garage. These were the first of the type to enter service with the Stagecoach Group.

=== Romford (NS) ===
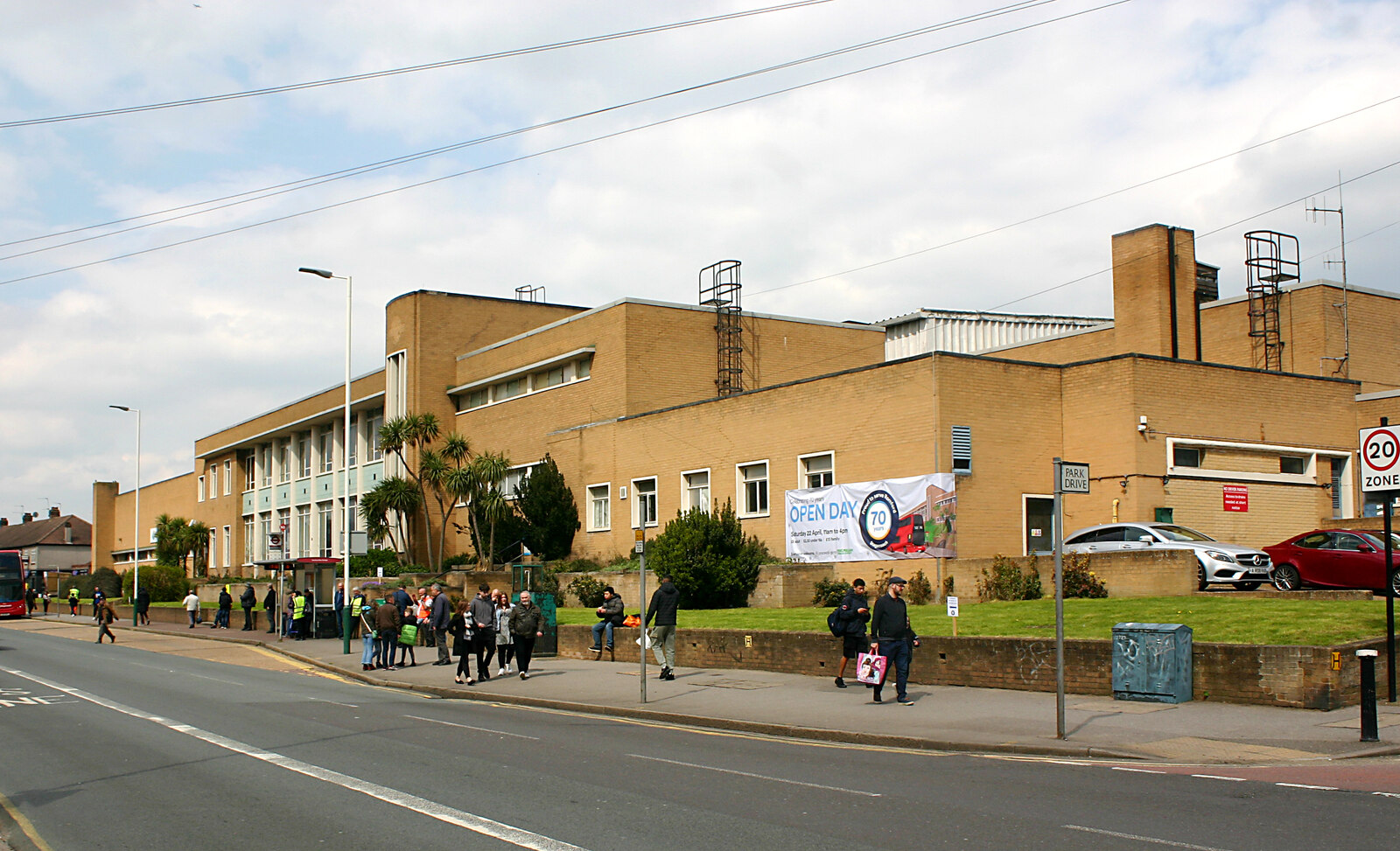
Romford bus garage as viewed from North Street, April 2023

Romford garage operates routes 86, 128, 193, 247, 294, 296, 365, 498 and N86.

Romford garage is also called North Street (hence its NS code) as London Transport already had a 'country bus' garage: Romford (London Road). It was opened in 1953 to take the strain off nearby Hornchurch garage, and also to cope with the new Harold Hill estate. Built in the post-war style of a London Underground station, it was initially able to house 115 buses, although only 67 were allocated when opened. The allocation grew to 90 by 1958.

In 1992, along with Barking and Seven Kings (which did subsequently close although due to loss of routes by competitive tender), the garage was earmarked for closure in favour of the new garage and company headquarters at Chadwell Heath, which ultimately was never built. By 1994, Romford was allocated 84 buses, mainly Leyland Titans. In 2004, the allocation had dropped slightly to 76, although with a good year of tender wins in 2005 the garage is up to full capacity. The garage was home to East London Coaches private hire operation from 1990 to 2005 when the section moved to the now closed Waterden Road garage. On 2 March 2013, route 86 was partially transferred from this garage to West Ham (WH).

=== Walthamstow (AW) ===
Walthamstow garage operates routes 379, 385, 397, W5, W11, W12, W16 and W19.

=== West Ham (WH) ===
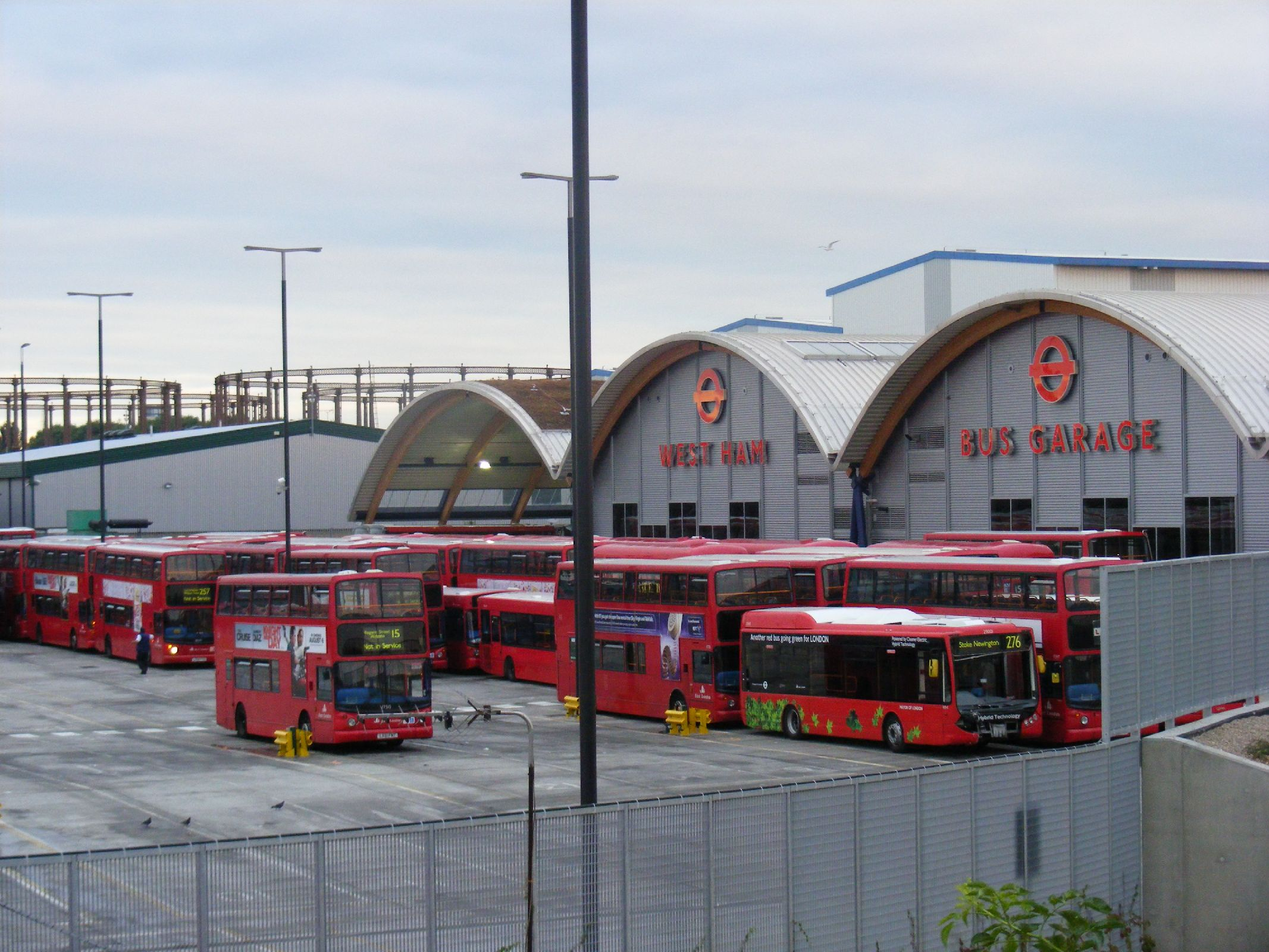
West Ham bus garage in July 2010

West Ham garage operates routes 241, 323, 649, 650, 651, 667, 687 and the Silvertown Tunnel cycle shuttle.

The present West Ham garage was opened in February 2008 as the replacement for Stratford garage. Whilst construction work was underway, all major engineering work on its buses was carried out at Rainham. The garage became fully operational in November 2009, taking over its own maintenance, and was formally opened in July 2010. The garage is capable of holding over 320 buses. It is the biggest bus garage in England and is the new location for Stagecoach London's head office and training centre.

== Former garages ==
=== Stratford (SD) ===
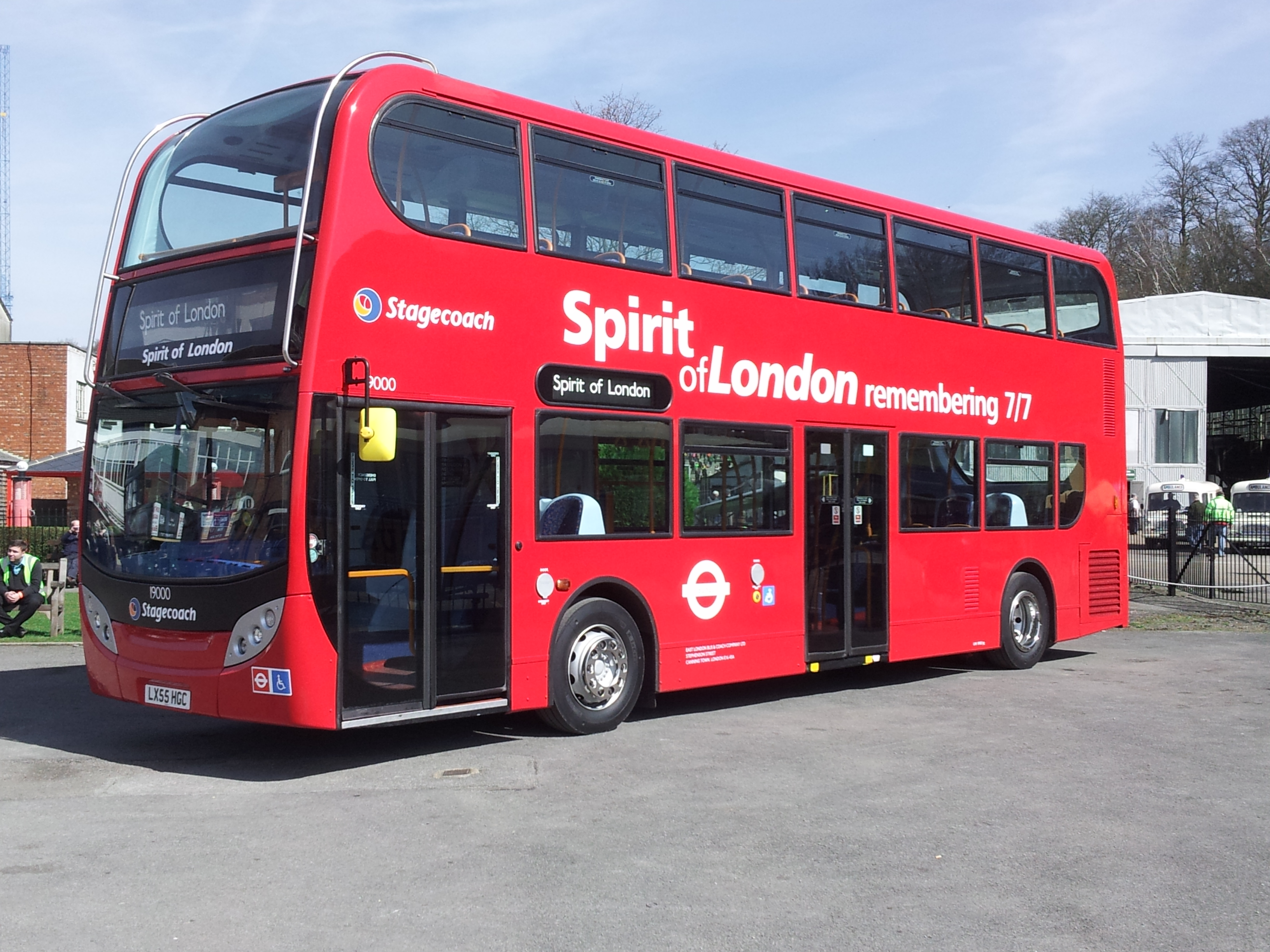
Stratford's Spirit of London Alexander Dennis Enviro400 at Brooklands Museum, commemorating the 7/7 London bombings

Stratford garage opened in 1992. It was a large yard on an old industrial estate by the River Lea, opposite the Hackney garage which was owned by First London. It was originally called Bow Midibus Base as it housed midibuses which had been previously based at Bow and West Ham. It also operated buses with rooftop flashing beacons for the London City Airport contract.

One vehicle from this garage was destroyed in the London bombings of 7 July 2005. Thirteen passengers were killed, but the driver of the route 30 bus, George Psaradakis, escaped serious injury and was able to return to work in September alongside Mark Maybanks, who was driving a route 26 bus that was involved in a thwarted bomb attempt in Haggerston on 21 July. The route 30 bus was replaced in October 2005 by the first Alexander Dennis Enviro400 off the production line, which was named "Spirit of London".

Stratford garage closed in February 2008, with operations transferred to West Ham, to allow the site to be redeveloped for the 2012 Olympic Games.

=== Waterden Road (WA) ===
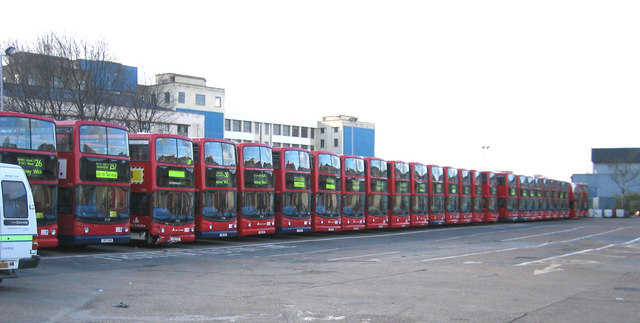
Waterden Road garage in January 2007

Waterden Road garage opened early in 2004 with space for approximately 100 buses, mainly articulated Mercedes-Benz Citaros for route 25. By 2005, East London had relocated both its training centre and its private hire fleet here. The private hire fleet was disbanded in 2007. The garage was open for less than four years. In December 2007, the site was closed to allow redevelopment for the 2012 Olympic Games. The training centre was moved to West Ham.

=== Upton Park (U) ===
Prior to West Ham being built Upton Park was the largest garage in the east end of London. It was opened by the LRCC in 1907 but was requisitioned for the war effort in 1915 and was not returned to use until 1919. In 1931, the site was revamped and enlarged; capacity was increased to just over 200 buses. In 1988, the garage operated the X15 Beckton Express using ex-Green Line AEC Routemaster RMCs. The service was a trial, and sold newspapers to commuters on board.

On 16 September 2011, Upton Park garage closed, with drivers, buses and routes redeployed to West Ham, Barking and Bow garages. A small number of non-driving staff were made redundant as a result of the closure. The garage was demolished in 2016 and redeveloped into a mixed-density social housing development named The Forge.

== Fleet ==
As of May 2015, East London had a peak vehicle requirement of 607 buses.
