= Walthamstow Central station =

London Underground and London Overground station

Walthamstow Central
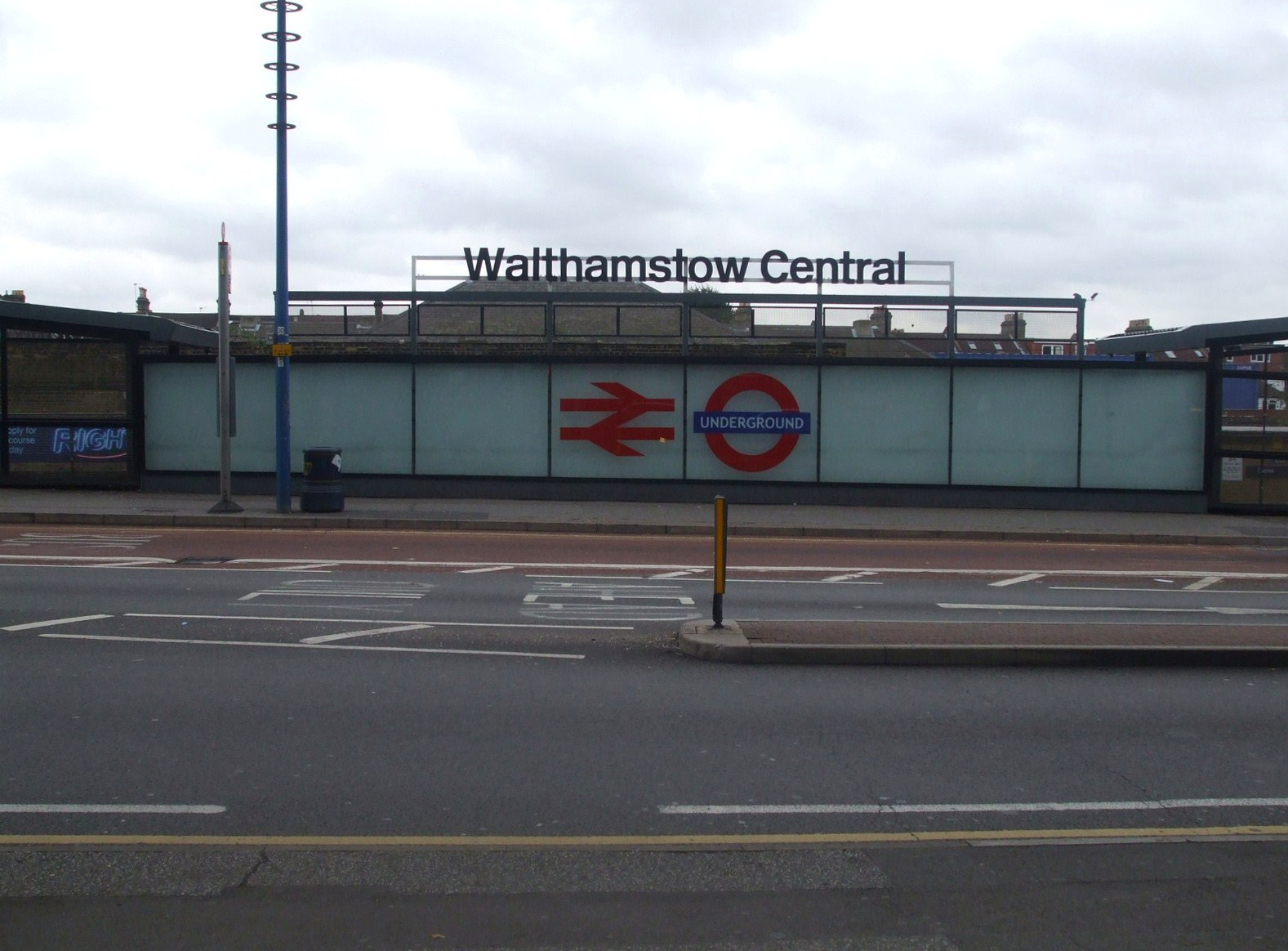
- Entrance on Selborne Road
- Interactive map of Walthamstow Central

General information
- Location: Walthamstow
- Local authority: London Borough of Waltham Forest
- Managed by: London Overground; London Underground
- Owners: Network Rail; London Underground
- Station code: WHC
- DfT category: C2
- Number of platforms: 4
- Accessible: Yes (London Overground only)
- Fare zone: 3
- OSI: Walthamstow Queen's Road

London Underground annual entry and exit
- 2021: ▼7.91 million
- 2022: ▲12.81 million
- 2023: ▲13.35 million
- 2024: ▼12.88 million
- 2025: ▲13.02 million

National Rail annual entry and exit
- 2020–21: ▼1.260 million
- 2021–22: ▲2.900 million
- 2022–23: ▲3.410 million
- 2023–24: ▲4.022 million
- 2024–25: ▲4.272 million

Key dates
- 26 April 1870: Opened (GER)
- 1 September 1968: Opened (Victoria line)

Other information
- External links: TfL station info page; Departures; Facilities
- Coordinates: 51.5831°N 0.0197°W

Walthamstow Central (/ˈwɔːlθəmstoʊ, ˈwɒl-/) is an interchange station in Walthamstow, in the London Borough of Waltham Forest. It is the northern terminus of the Victoria line, which has the most frequent service of any London Underground line. It is also a through-station on the Weaver line services of the London Overground. The station lies at a distance of 6 miles 16 chains (10.0 km) from London Liverpool Street in London fare zone 3.

The station is located close to Walthamstow Queen's Road station, which is on the Suffragette line of the Overground. There is an official out-of-station interchange between the two stations, and there is a footpath called Ray Dudley Way to connect them. Walthamstow Central also serves as the closest tube station to Walthamstow Market, the longest outdoor market in Europe.

== History ==
The station was opened by the Great Eastern Railway (GER) as Hoe Street in 1870 when a line was opened from Lea Bridge to a temporary station called Shern Hall Street which was east of the Hoe Street station. The line to London, that the Chingford branch uses today was opened two years later in 1872 from Hall Farm Junction to Bethnal Green, with the branch also being extended north to Chingford in 1873.

The GER amalgamated with several other railways to create the London and North Eastern Railway at the beginning of 1923. In 1948 the railways were nationalised and responsibility for operating the station fell to British Railways (Eastern Region). The line was electrified in the late 1950s with electric services commencing on 12 November 1960. Early services were formed of Class 305 EMUs but initial technical problems with these saw replacements by Class 302 and Class 304 EMUs.

The station became an interchange station and the eastern terminus of the Victoria line with London Underground services starting on 1 September 1968; when the station's present name was adopted. When originally approved in 1955, the terminus of the line was to be at Wood Street, a plan dropped in 1961 before construction of the line. The platforms for the Victoria line (like all stations on the Victoria line) are underground.

On 31 May 2015, the station's Abellio Greater Anglia services were transferred to London Overground Rail Operations.

== Description ==
=== General description ===
The underground station, like many stations on the Victoria line, was built to a low budget. White ceiling panels were never fixed to the ceilings above the platforms; instead the steel tunnel segments were painted black and used to support the fixtures and fittings, cutting lighting levels. A concrete stairway sits between two escalators instead of a third; this economy caused a disruptive station closure for several weeks in 2004 when both escalators went out of service.

The main entrance to the above-ground station is on the down side, opposite the bus station, which was revamped in summer 2004. Until August 2015 three staffed ticket windows opened, replaced by improved ticket machines. The entrance to the tube was revamped in early 2006. A smaller entrance is on the up line, facing a car park. Its ticket office is staffed mainly in peak hours.

=== Major improvements ===
A subway was built in 2005 under Selborne Road linking a new bus station with a new Victoria line ticket office. The new subway and ticket office was scheduled for spring 2005 but problems with insufficient power capacity to supply two new lifts, planning and contractual errors, delayed the opening until 19 November 2007. The lifts began operation in late 2008 and some building work took longer to finish. Ticket barriers control access to all platforms.

A footpath link, called Ray Dudley Way, providing a shortcut to nearby Walthamstow Queen's Road, opened in August 2014. Plans for a new entrance with step-free access to the Victoria line platforms were approved by Waltham Forest council in January 2021 to be part-funded by a redevelopment of the shopping mall.

== Services ==
Services at Walthamstow Central are operated by the Victoria line of the London Underground and the Weaver line of the London Overground.

The typical all-week (including Sundays) service pattern on the Weaver line is:

- 4 trains per hour (tph) to London Liverpool Street;
- 4 tph to Chingford.

Preceding station	London Underground	Following station
Blackhorse Road towards Brixton	Victoria line	Terminus
Preceding station	London Overground	Following station
St. James Street towards Liverpool Street	Weaver line Lea Valley lines	Wood Street towards Chingford
Abandoned plans
Preceding station	London Underground	Following station
Blackhorse Road towards Victoria	Victoria line	Walthamstow Wood Street Terminus
Disused railways
St James Street	Great Eastern Railway (1870–1873)	Shern Hall Street; Terminus

== Connections ==
London Buses routes 20, 34, 55, 58, 69, 97, 212, 215, 230, 257, 275, 357, W11, W12, W15, W19, SL1, SL2, school route 675 and night routes N26, N38 and N73 serve the station and bus station.

== Bibliography ==
- Day, John R; Reed, John (2010) [1963]. The Story of London's Underground. Capital Transport. ISBN 978-1-85414-341-9.
- Horne, Mike (2005). The Victoria Line: An Illustrated History. Capital Transport. ISBN 1-85414-292-5.
- Martin, Andrew (2012). Underground, Overground. Profile Books. ISBN 978-1-846-68478-4.
