= Stagecoach London =

London bus operator

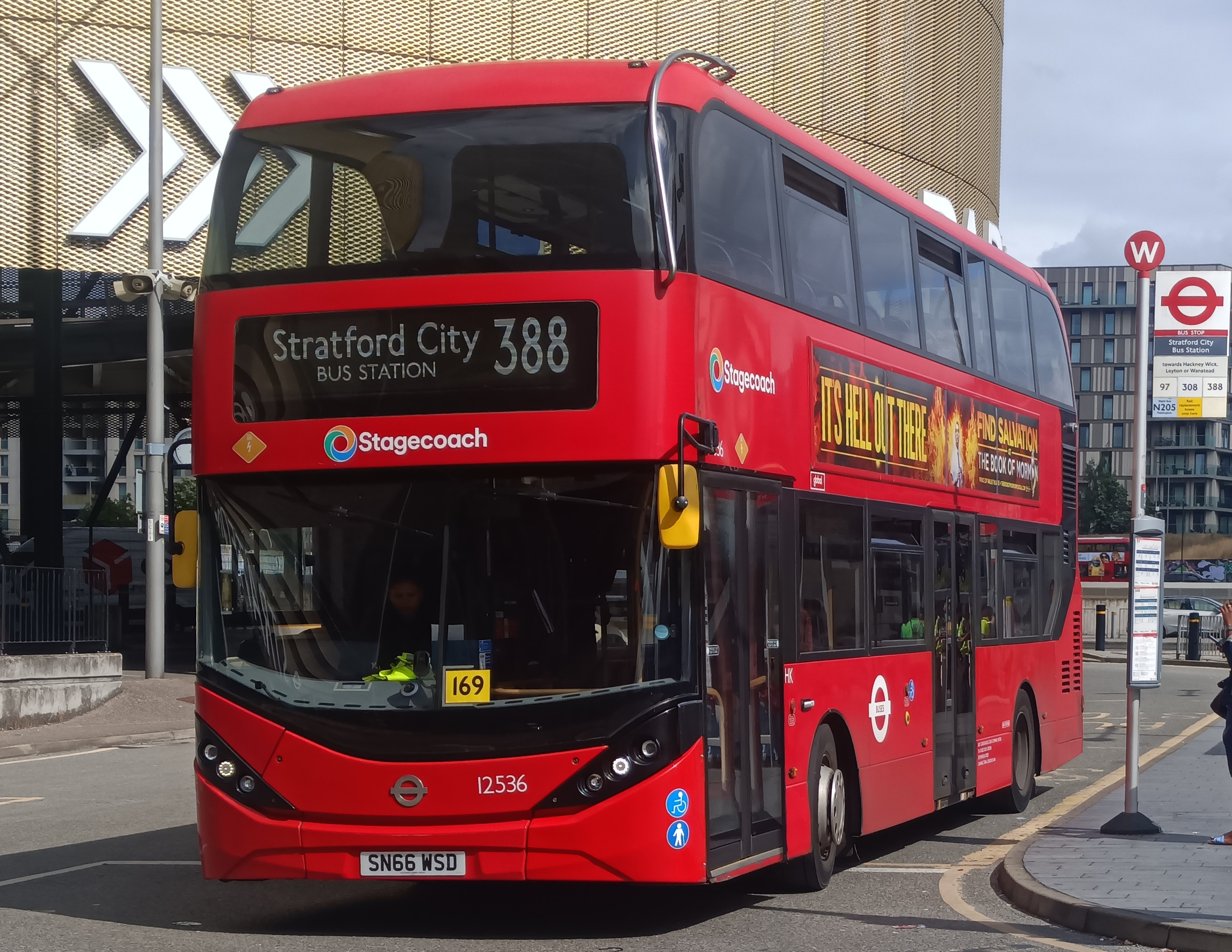
- Alexander Dennis Enviro400H City on route 388 at Stratford City bus station in July 2025
- Parent: Stagecoach
- Founded: 1994
- Headquarters: West Ham, London, England
- Service area: London; Kent
- Service type: Bus services
- Depots: 13
- Fleet: 1,499 (March 2026)
- Operator: East London; Selkent; Thameside; Lea Interchange Bus Company
- Website: www.stagecoachbus.com/about/london

Stagecoach London is a major bus operator in Greater London. It is a subsidiary of Stagecoach and operates services under contract to Transport for London mostly in East and South East London, as well as some services running into Central London.

It is the largest subsidiary of the Stagecoach Group, with 283.4 million passenger journeys taken on Stagecoach London buses between May 2018 and April 2019, and as of March 2026, the fleet consisted of 1,499 buses.

== History ==
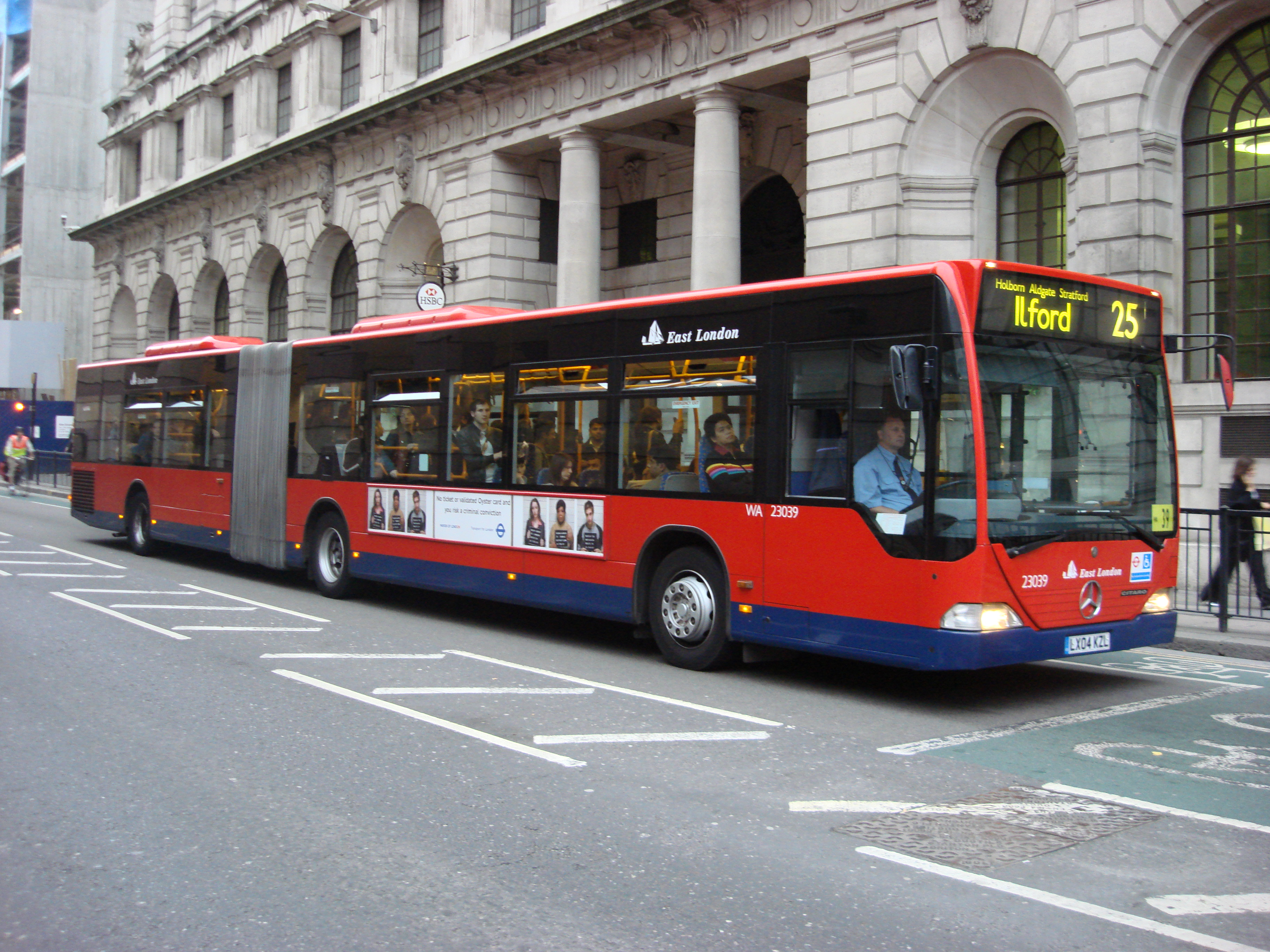
Mercedes-Benz Citaro articulated bus in April 2007, during the ownership of Macquarie which restored East London branding

In 1994, Stagecoach purchased the East London and Selkent operations during the privatisation of London bus services. Both continued to trade under their existing names until November 2000 when Stagecoach consolidated its London operations under the Stagecoach London brand with both remaining as separate legal entities.

In August 2006, Stagecoach sold its London bus operations to Macquarie Bank for £263.6 million (equivalent to £455,548,000 in 2025). The new owner restored the East London and Selkent trading names and logos, and in September 2008, established Thameside to operate route 248. In October 2010, Stagecoach reacquired its old London operations with all operations once again rebranded as Stagecoach London.

In May 2022, Stagecoach announced it would take over Tower Transit's Lea Interchange garage for £20 million. The takeover was completed on 25 June 2022, with Stagecoach operating the garage under the Lea Interchange Bus Company Limited legal entity.

Following negotiations between the two operators while its regional operations were shut down ahead of entry into administration, in August 2022, social enterprise operator HCT Group's Transport for London operations, consisting of 17 bus routes, were purchased by Stagecoach London. The deal saw around 500 members of staff and 160 buses transfer to Stagecoach's East London operation, along with leases on the HCT Group's Ash Grove and Walthamstow Avenue garages.

== Operations ==
Stagecoach London operates services under contract to Transport for London. These are operated by 4 subsidiaries which all exist under the Stagecoach London brand:

- East London (East London Bus & Coach Company Limited)
- Selkent (South East London & Kent Bus Company Limited)
- Thameside (East London Bus & Coach Company Limited)
- Lea Interchange Bus Company (Lea Interchange Bus Company Limited)

In 2000, Stagecoach's standard bus livery of a dark blue skirt and orange and light blue swirl at the rear with the standard white replaced by red was introduced. After the sale to Macquarie Bank, an all-red livery was introduced.

A coach operation trading under the brand East London Coaches, which ceased in February 2007, and a Travelshop, which closed in March 2009, were both based at the company's then-Ilford head office. The head office is now at the West Ham depot.

=== Thameside ===
==== Rainham (RM) ====
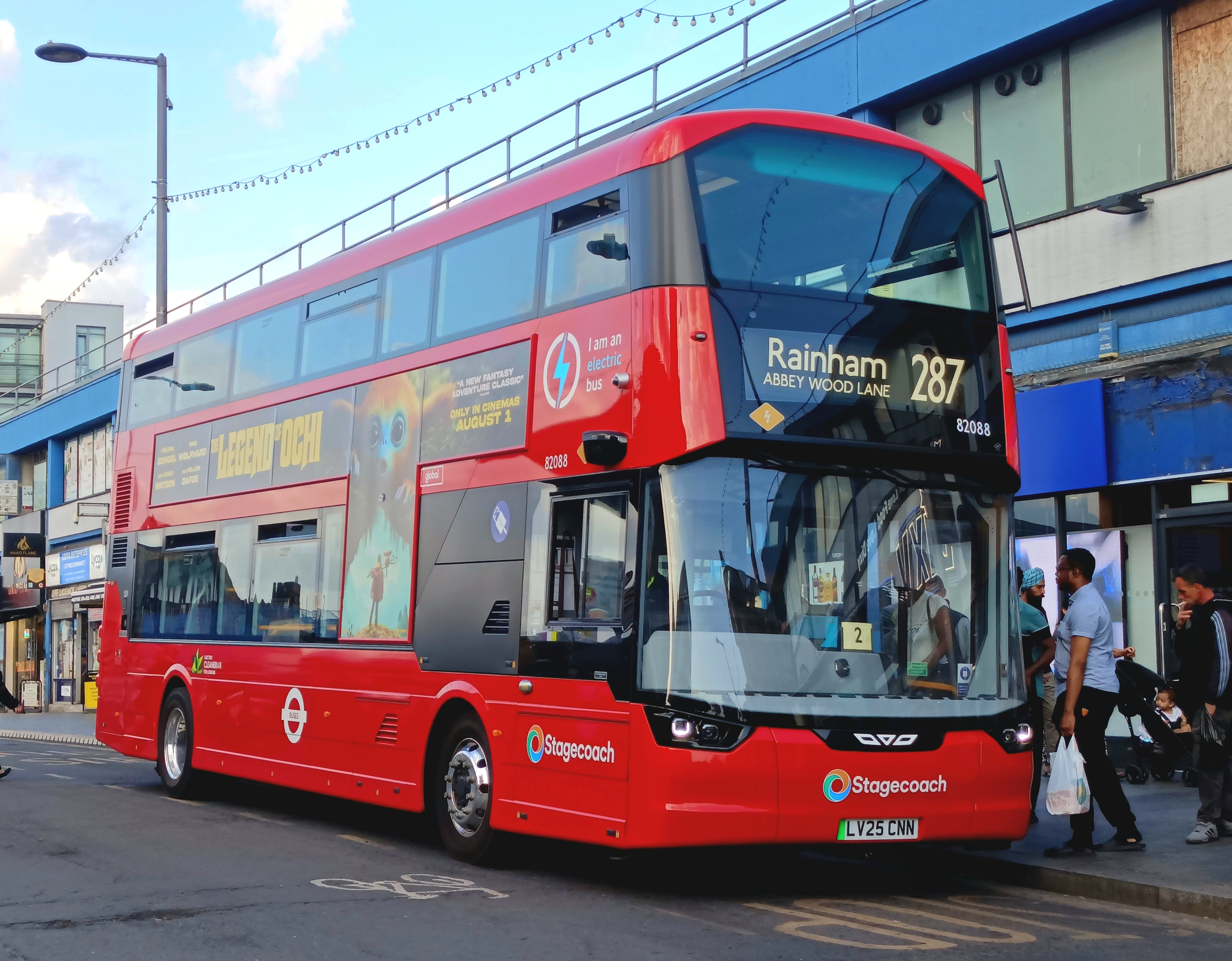
Thameside Wright StreetDeck Electroliner on route 287 at Barking station in July 2025

Rainham garage operates routes 165, 174, 252, 256, 287, 346, 365, 372, 496, 499, 674 and SL12.

==== History ====
The garage was opened in 2007 after Waterden Road was closed to allow the site to be redeveloped for the 2012 Olympic Games.

In May 2008, all buses along with the trainers were moved into the new West Ham garage, meaning Rainham no longer operated any Transport for London routes. Rainham carried out all the engineering work until the new West Ham garage was completed in 2009.

Transport for London routes returned to Rainham on 27 September 2008 when route 248 commenced.

=== Lea Interchange Bus Company ===
==== Lea Interchange (LI) ====
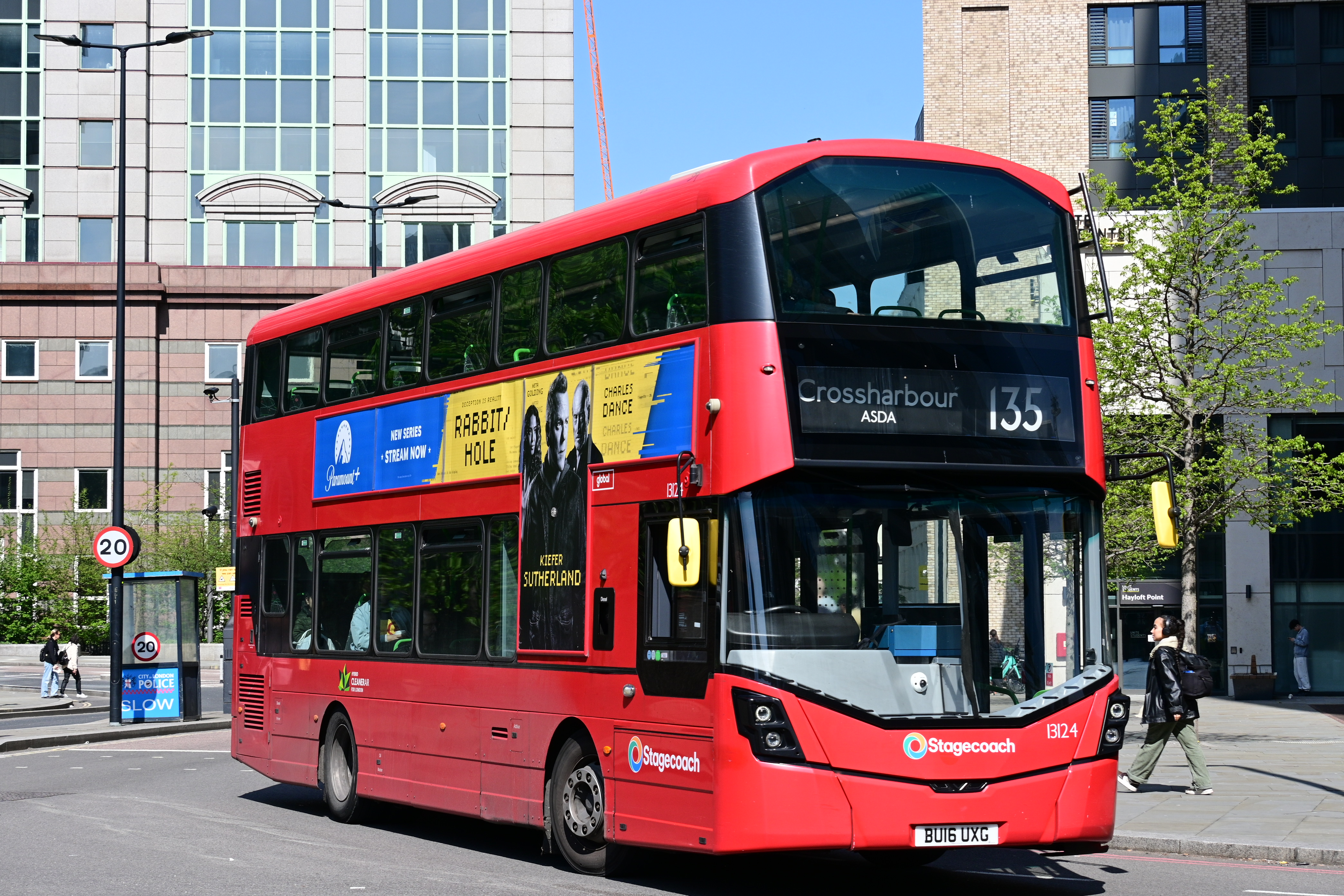
Stagecoach took over the Lea Interchange bus routes (such as route 135) from Tower Transit in 2022.

Lea Interchange garage operates routes 58, 86, 97, 135, 236, 276, 308, 339, 488, 678, D8, W13 and W14.

Lea Interchange was opened by First London in 2007 to replace its Waterden Road, Stratford garage that closed as part of the development of the Olympic Park for the 2012 Olympic and Paralympic Games. The garage was one of three sold by First in June 2013 to Tower Transit, later being sold as Tower Transit's last-remaining garage in May 2022 to Stagecoach London. The garage today operates as a standalone Stagecoach London subsidiary, trading under the legal name Lea Interchange Bus Company Limited.

In 2023, Waltham Forest Council proposed the construction of eight high-rise residential towers, capable of housing up to 5,000 residents, in the Leyton area. One of these towers would be situated on the site of Lea Interchange garage, which is planned to be rebuilt as an all-electric garage at the base of a tower housing 650 apartments.

== Fleet ==
As of March 2026, the Stagecoach London fleet consisted of 1,499 buses.
