= Low-emission buses in London =

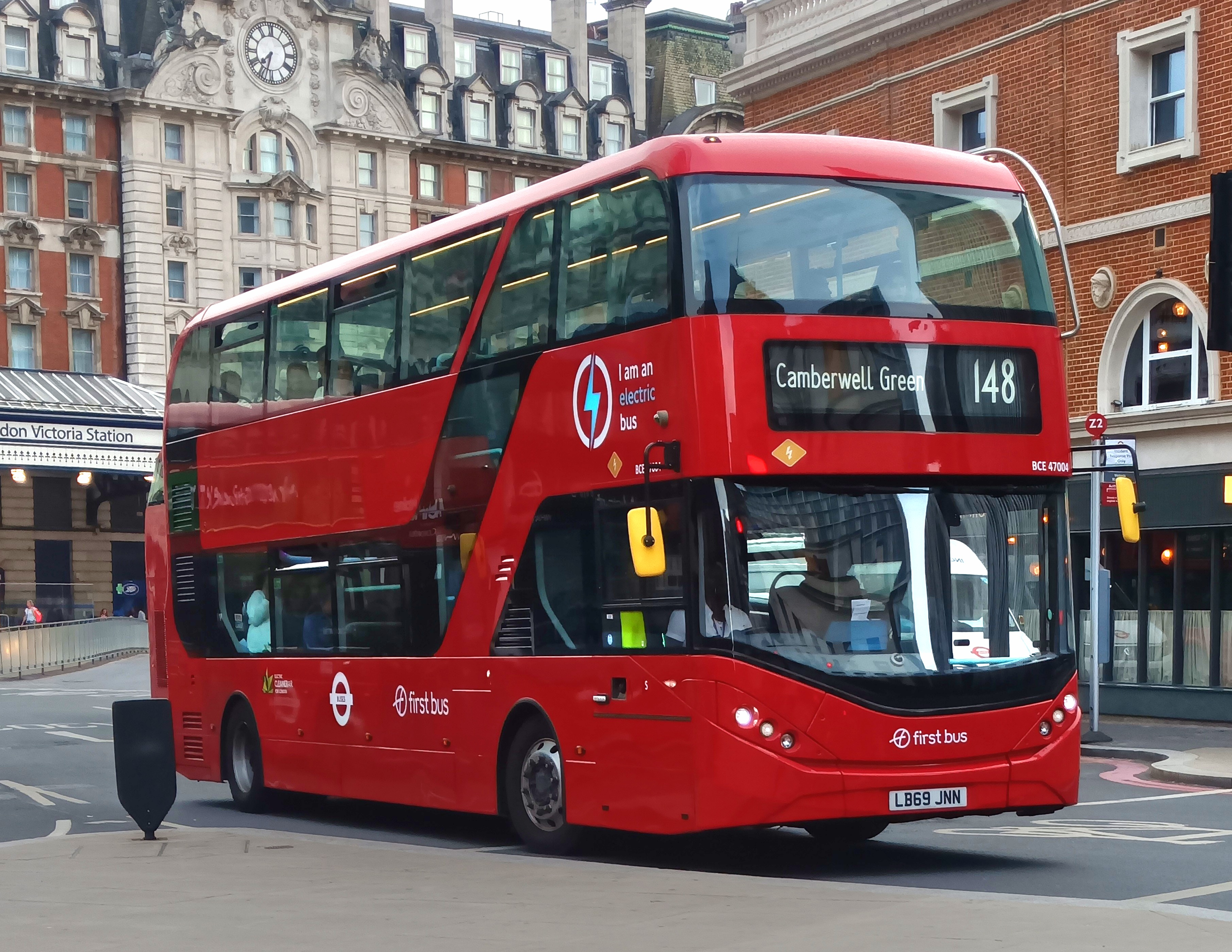
Double-decker battery electric bus

There are 3,668 hybrid buses, 2,937 battery electric buses, and 20 hydrogen fuel cell buses operating in London, as of March 2026, out of a total bus fleet of 8,982. 74% of the bus fleet is low emission, with 32% of the fleet being zero emission.

In 2021, it was announced that all buses in the fleet meet or exceed Euro VI emission standards, following the phasing out of older buses, the retrofitting of diesel vehicles and the introduction of new hybrid and electric buses. From 2021, all new buses will be zero emission, and the entire bus fleet will be zero emission by 2034, although Transport for London (TfL) have stated that with additional funding, this could be achieved by 2030.

In June 2026, TfL announced that over 3,000 zero emission buses were in service, with 135 zero emission bus routes. This is the largest fleet in Europe ahead of Moscow, which has over 2,700 electric buses operating. TfL note that the bus fleet has lower carbon dioxide emissions per passenger kilometre than other major cities such as New York, Paris and Vancouver.

== Background ==
In 2006, transport was responsible for around 20% of London's CO_{2} emissions; with buses making up 5% of the transport total. The city set a target of a 20% reduction in emissions by the year 2020. Converting London's entire bus fleet to hybrid vehicles would reduce CO_{2} emissions by around 200,000 tonnes per year. Diesel buses also produce particulate pollution, which is harmful to health. By using less diesel fuel, operators can also reduce the running cost of their bus fleet.

Hybrid electric buses use a combination of an electric battery pack and a diesel engine to provide power, and produce around 40% less carbon dioxide (CO_{2}) emissions than traditional diesel engined buses. Energy generated during braking is used to charge the batteries of hybrid vehicles. Battery electric buses use on-board batteries to power an electric motor that drives the bus. Unlike a hybrid electric bus, there are no local emissions. As with hybrid buses, regenerative braking is used to charge the batteries. Hydrogen fuel cell buses use the reaction of hydrogen with oxygen to generate electricity that drives the bus with an electric motor. The only emission from the bus is water.

== Operational history ==
In the 1990s, early efforts to improve emissions involved replacing older diesel buses such as the AEC Routemaster, use of ultra-low-sulfur diesel, and fitting diesel particulate filters to exhausts. In 2000, three DAF SB220 East Lancs Myllennium buses powered by liquefied petroleum gas were used to transport visitors to the Millennium Dome. By December 2005, all buses met Euro II emission standards with particulate filters fitted, with the first Euro IV bus entering service in April 2006.

=== Early trials and tests ===
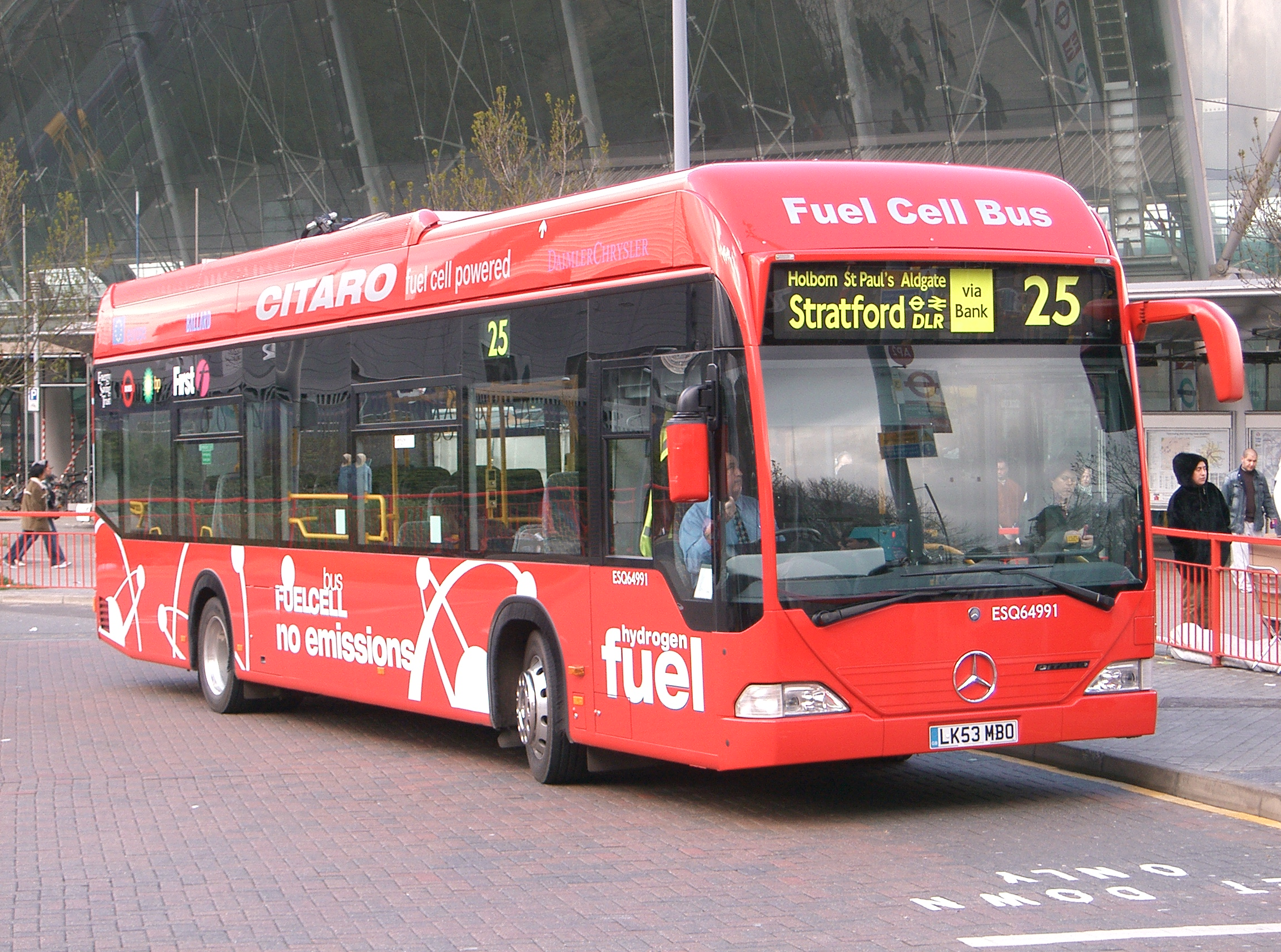
Hydrogen fuel cell powered Mercedes-Benz Citaro at Stratford in 2004

In January 2004, three hydrogen fuel cell powered buses were introduced on route 25 on a two-year trial. These were transferred to route RV1 in September 2004, and were tested in commercial service on the route at peak times only. They were withdrawn in January 2007.

The first hybrid buses to enter service in London were six Wright Electrocity single-deckers. These were ordered in March 2005 to operate on route 360. The single decker buses were unveiled by Mayor of London, Ken Livingstone on 7 February 2006, with the intention of starting operation on the following day. Later in 2006 the vehicles were temporarily withdrawn from service when their diesel engines overheated.

A double-deck hybrid vehicle intended for use in London was unveiled in October 2006. The bus, which cost £285,000 and was constructed by Wrightbus, was the first hybrid double-decker in the world, and was painted in red and green to symbolise the environmental benefits. It entered service in February 2007 on route 141.

An ethanol fuelled double-decker bus was operated by Transdev London in 2008 and 2009. In 2010, eight hydrogen buses were introduced on route RV1, with a substantially larger range than the fuel cell buses used in the mid-2000s. At the time, this was the largest hydrogen bus fleet in Europe.

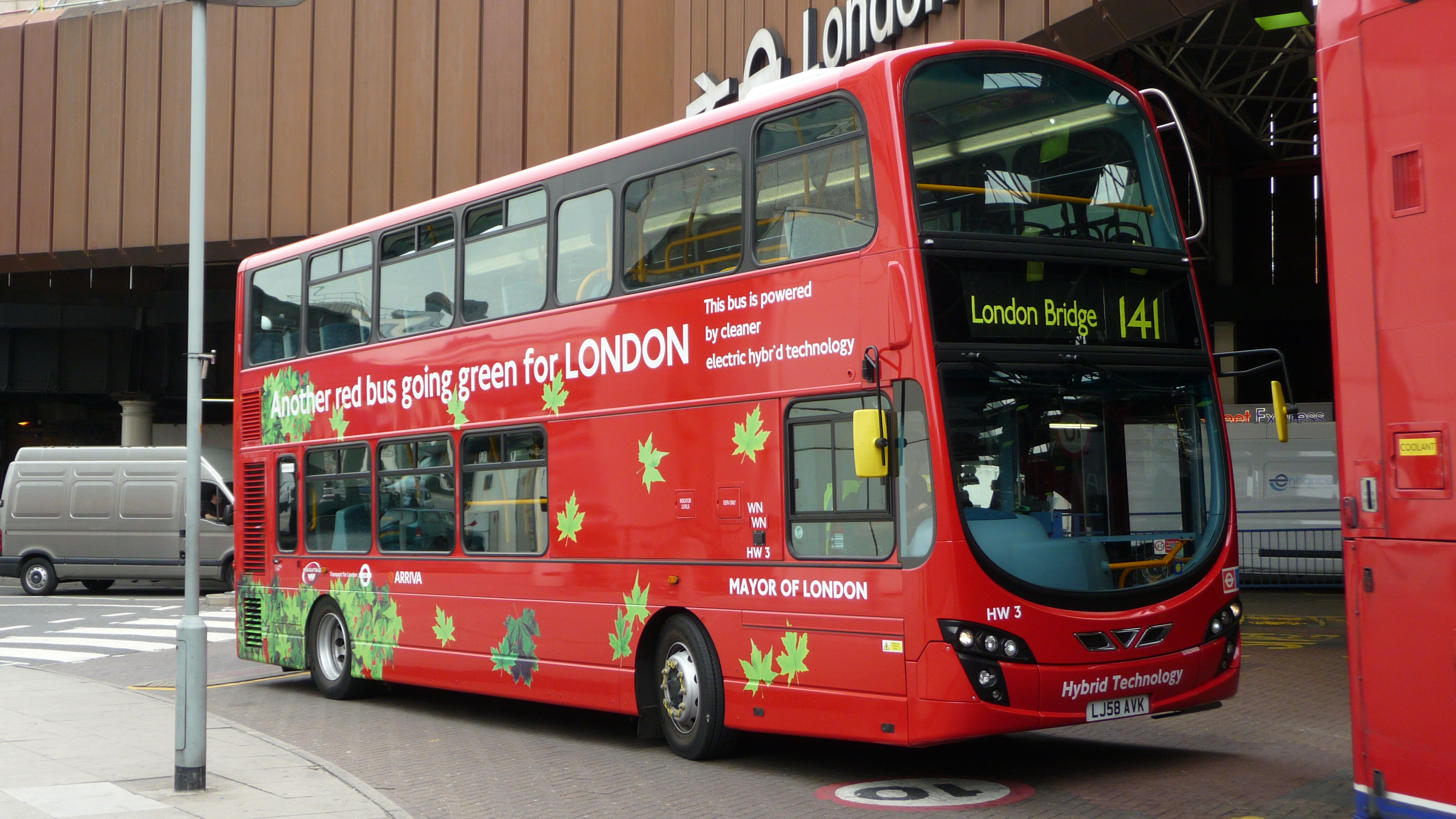
Route 141 was the first bus route in the world to be operated with a hybrid double-decker.

=== Introduction of hybrids ===
Twenty-five vehicles entered service in December 2008, introduced onto five routes run by four different operators. A further eighteen entered service in July 2009, when six Volvo B5L double-deckers joined the existing vehicles on route 141.

Transport for London stated that it intended to have introduced around 300 hybrids into service by 2012. This was achieved in July 2012, when an Alexander Dennis Enviro400 double-decker of Abellio London became the 300th hybrid in use when it entered service on route 211. It was originally intended that every bus introduced into service after 2012 would be a hybrid, but this requirement was later dropped. By 2021, over 3,800 buses in the fleet were hybrid. TfL noted in 2025 that bus manufacturers did not produce hybrid single-decker buses following tests of prototype vehicles.

A trial of inductive charging technology for three modified Alexander Dennis Enviro400H double-deckers was announced in August 2014. The vehicles, on route 69, receive current to charge the traction batteries while at stands at either end of the route. Although it is intended that the units are to operate in "pure electric" mode, a standard diesel engine is also carried.

=== Retrofitting diesel buses ===
In the 2010s, bus operators retrofitted older buses to improve fuel economy, reduce air pollution and meet emission standards. The use of filters had reduced particulate emissions from the bus fleet from over 200 tonnes in 1997 to 10 tonnes in 2008. A three-year £86m project to improve 5,000 buses to Euro VI emission standards was completed in 2021.

A kinetic energy recovery system using a carbon fibre flywheel, originally developed for the Williams Formula One racing team, has been modified for retrofitting to existing double-decker buses. 500 buses from the Go-Ahead Group will be fitted with this technology from 2014 to 2016, anticipated to improve fuel efficiency by approximately 20%. The team who developed the technology were awarded the Dewar Trophy of the Royal Automobile Club in 2015.

=== New Routemaster Programme ===
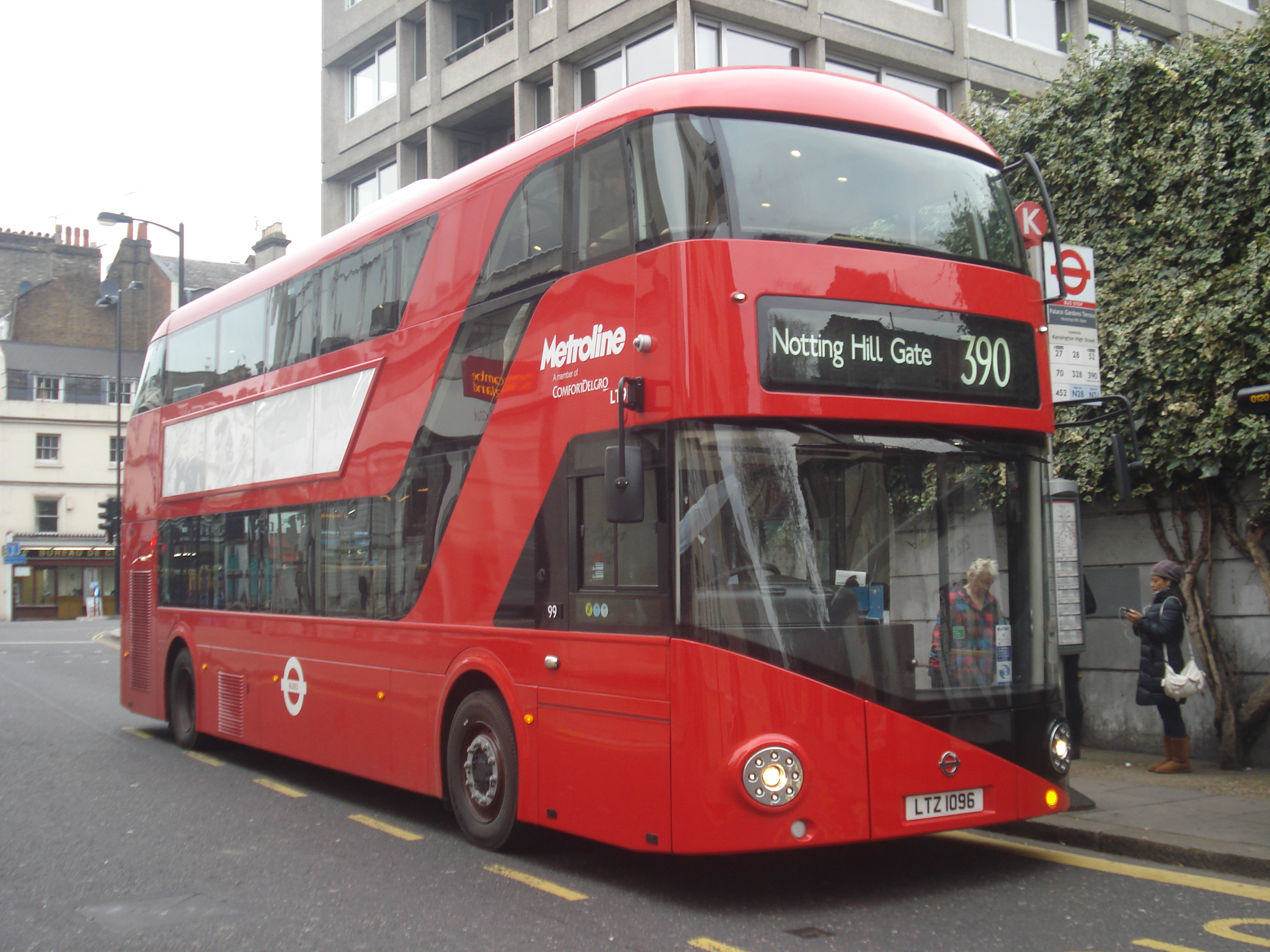
A total of 1000 New Routemaster buses were introduced between 2012 and 2018.

The New Routemaster double-decker was specified and constructed to a hybrid design. The bus was designed to be 40% more fuel-efficient than conventional diesel buses, and 15% more than London hybrid buses already in operation, reducing nitrogen oxide emissions by 40% and particulate matter by 33% compared with diesel buses. The first eight vehicles entered service with Arriva London on route 38 in February 2012. By 2018, a total of 1,000 New Routemasters were in service. However, the buses have suffered from problems with their battery systems with some operating solely as diesel vehicles, and in total 200 buses will have power units replaced under warranty.

In 2022, Equipmake converted a New Routemaster bus to use batteries, replacing the diesel engine and hybrid system with a 400kWh battery and electric motors. Equipmake suggested that the conversion could be cheaper than purchasing new battery electric buses.

=== Introduction of battery electric buses ===
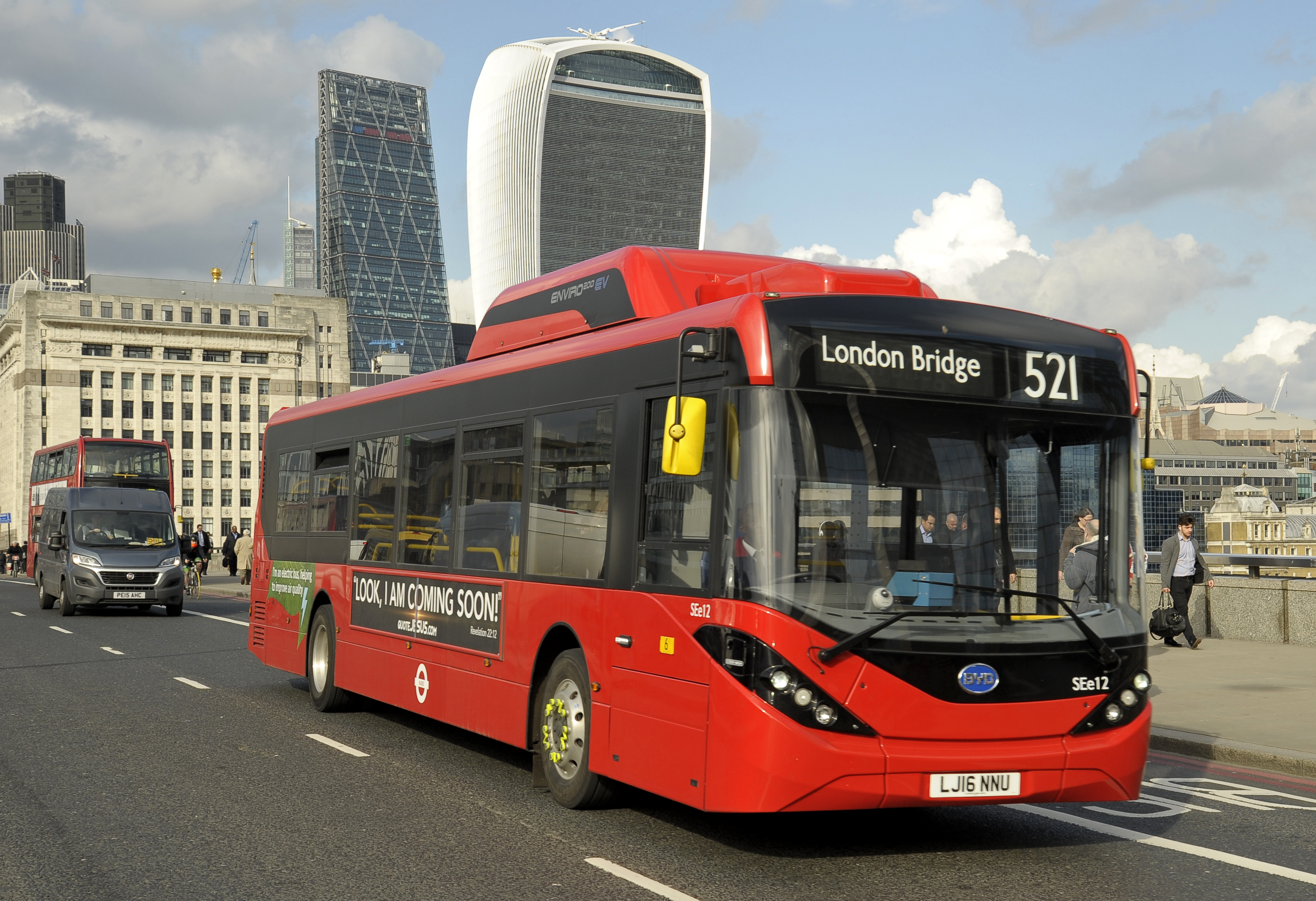
Battery electric powered Enviro200EV on route 521, one of the first London bus routes to be fully electrified.

In 2011, TfL noted that battery electric buses did not yet have the range and reliability to be used in London, but the introduction of these buses in China was being monitored. In December 2013, the first battery electric buses entered service in London as a trial on routes 521 and 507, using BYD Auto buses built in China. BYD estimated that the cost savings could be up to 75%, owing to the cost of electricity compared to diesel fuel. The trial was successful, and further orders for battery electric buses followed.

In 2015, the world's first battery electric double-decker bus entered service on route 98. The first routes in London solely served by battery electric single decker buses were routes 521 and 507 in 2016. Alongside the electrification of routes 521 and 507, Waterloo bus garage was converted to become fully electric, the first bus depot in Europe to do so. The first route in London solely served by electric double-decker buses was route 43 in 2019.

In January 2021, it was announced that all buses in the fleet meet or exceed Euro VI emission standards, following the phasing out of older buses, the retrofitting of diesel vehicles and the introduction of new hybrid & electric buses. In September 2021, TfL announced that all new buses entering service would be zero emission.

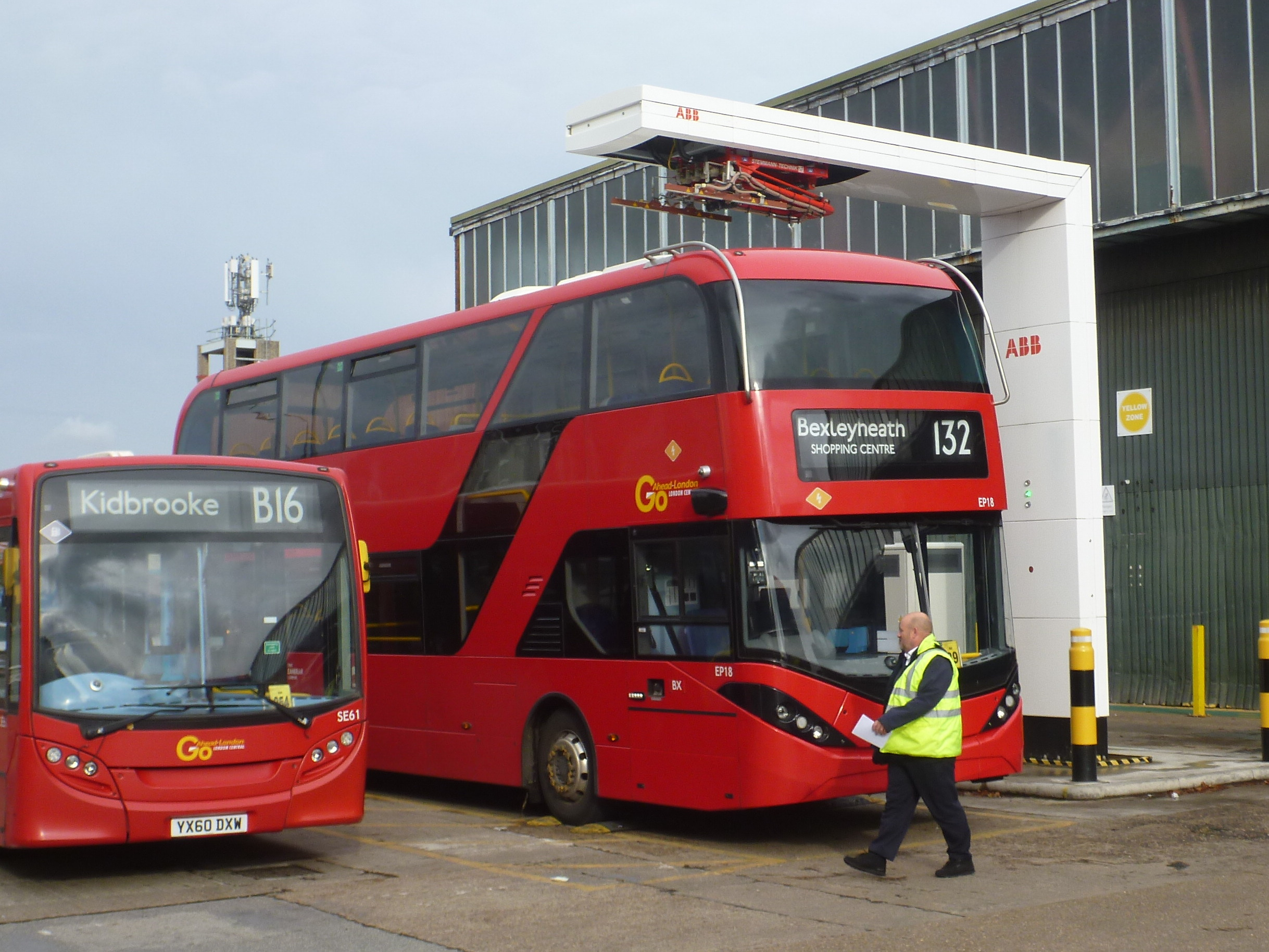
Alexander Dennis Enviro400 City EV battery electric bus being charged using a pantograph at Bexleyheath bus garage.

By March 2022, over 700 electric buses were in service. In October 2022, rapid charging using a pantograph was introduced for battery electric buses on route 132, testing the use of this technology in London. This allows batteries to be 'topped up' during the day.

In August 2023, the 1000th zero emission bus entered service (a Wright StreetDeck Electroliner), with TfL announcing later that month that London had the largest fleet of zero emission buses in Europe. In November 2023, tour bus operator Tootbus London announced they would be retrofitting their buses with electric drivetrains from Magtec, making them zero-emission.

In August 2024, Alexander Dennis announced that their new Enviro400EV double decker bus would have a 14 year or 1 million kilometres (620,000 mi) warranty, allowing them to be used for two consecutive TfL bus contracts without needing a battery replacement. In October 2024, operator Go-Ahead Group announced that they had placed an order for over 1,500 electric buses at a cost of £500 million, with nearly 1,000 of those buses to enter service in London from late 2024 onwards. Bus operator Arriva London reported that they are investing £730 million in upgrading and electrifying their garages. Bloomberg reported challenges regarding the electrification of bus depots, such as competing demands for land (new housing and industry), as well as the cost and delays of connecting to high voltage electricity.

In November 2024, Irizar ie tram electric buses entered service on route 358, fast charging the batteries using a pantograph – this allows the bus to continue operating in service without having to be charged at the depot. TfL noted that 1,700 zero emission buses were now in service, and they expected 2,500 to be in service by the end of 2025. In June 2025, TfL announced that over 2,000 zero emission buses were in service (around 20% of the bus fleet), with 107 zero emission bus routes.

In January 2026, First Bus London warned that electrifying the bus fleet by 2030 was “next to impossible to achieve” and that bus companies needed greater incentives (such as longer or "more lucrative" contracts) to upgrade bus garages and purchase new electric buses.

In June 2026, TfL announced that over 3,000 zero emission buses were in service (around a third of the bus fleet), with 135 zero emission bus routes, and 68 routes partially converted to zero emission vehicles.

=== Introduction of double-decker hydrogen fuel cell buses ===
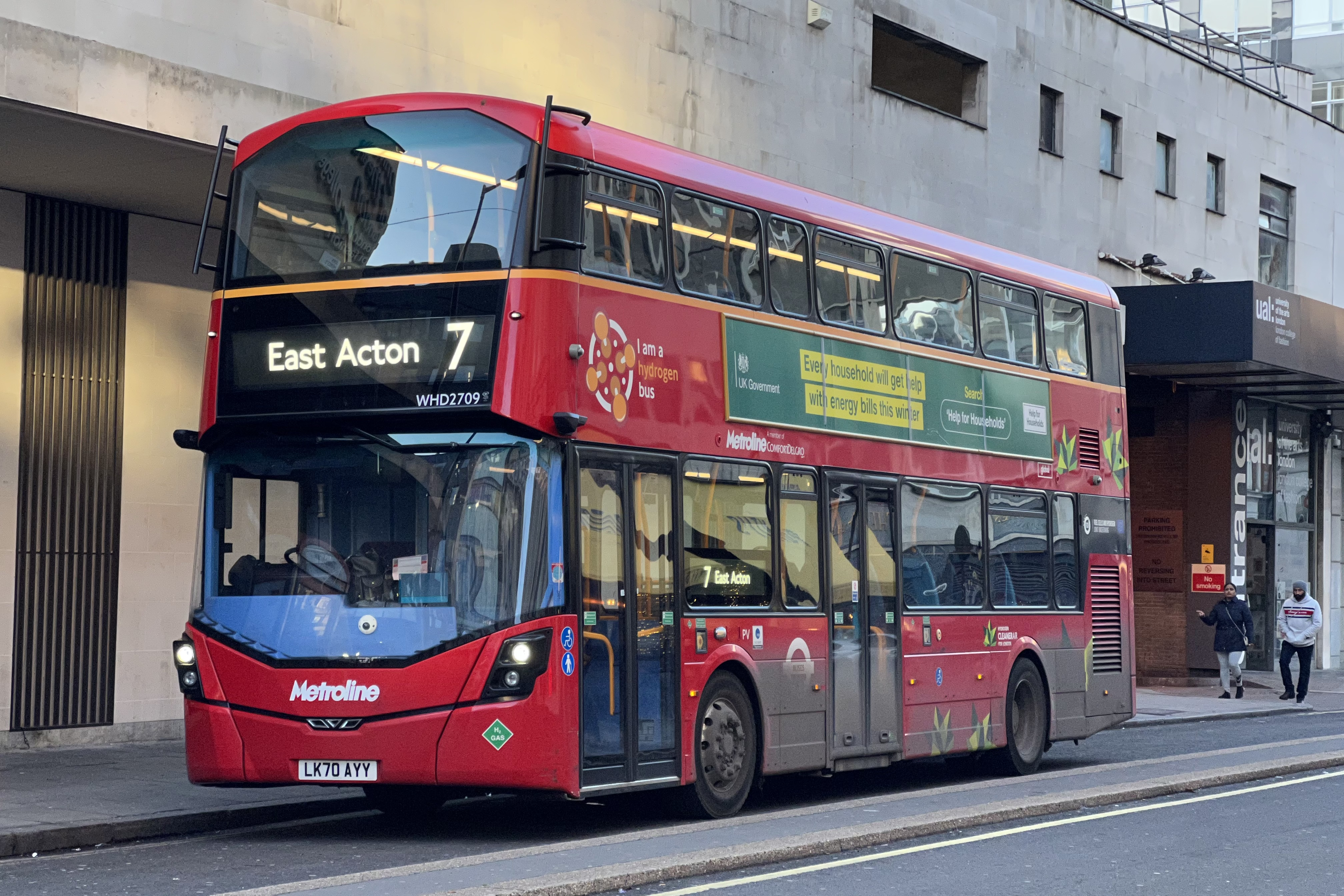
Hydrogen fuel cell powered Wright StreetDeck Hydroliner as used on route 7

While hydrogen fuel cell buses had been running in London since 2004, these had all been single decker buses. In June 2021, the world's first hydrogen fuel cell double-decker bus – the Wright StreetDeck Hydroliner – entered service on route 7. As of June 2025, 20 hydrogen buses are in service in London.

== Future plans ==
The entire fleet will be zero emission by 2034, although Transport for London have stated that with additional funding, this could be achieved by 2030.

TfL's Bus Action Plan notes that overnight charging of battery electric buses may not be suitable for around 15% of routes, given their long route length. For those routes, TfL are considering the use of "opportunity charging" where buses fast charge while in service, or using hydrogen fuel cell buses.

All bus routes that use the Silvertown Tunnel – a new crossing of the River Thames in East London that opened on 7 April 2025 – are zero emission.

== Summary of current operations ==
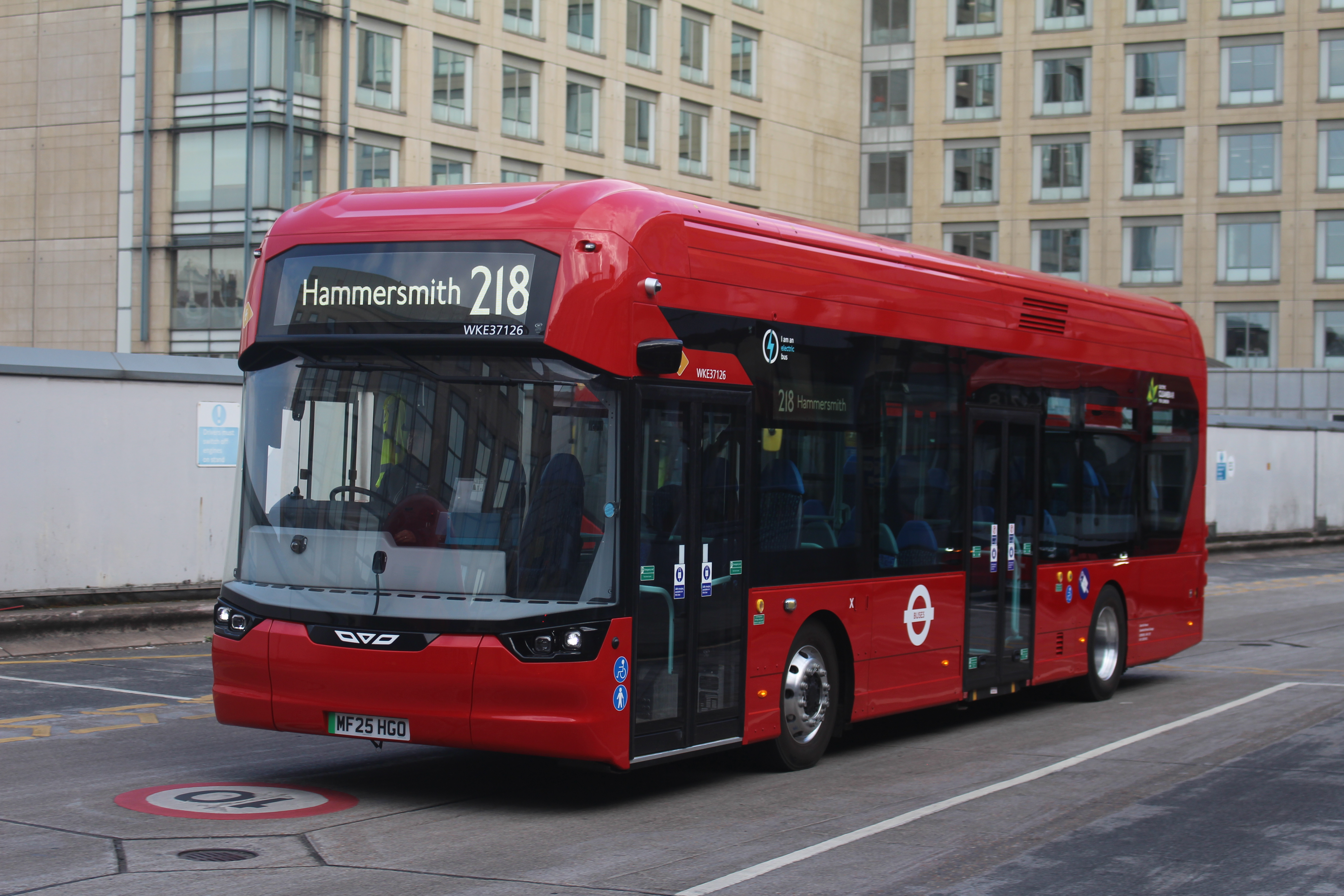
Wright GB Kite Electroliner battery electric bus as used on route 218

135 bus routes are operated using solely zero emission vehicles.

A variety of hybrid vehicles are currently used. These include the Volvo B5LH, Alexander Dennis Enviro400H, Wright Streetdeck, Wright SRM and New Routemaster.

Battery electric and hydrogen fuel cell vehicles currently used include the Alexander Dennis Enviro200 EV, Caetano e.City Gold, Wright GB Kite Electroliner, Optare MetroCity EV and Volvo BZL single-deckers and Wright StreetDeck, Optare MetroDecker EV, Alexander Dennis Enviro400 EV City and Volvo BZL double-deckers.

However, there are no longer any hybrid single-deckers. Former types include the Alexander Dennis Enviro200H, Wright Electrocity and Optare Tempo. All hybrid Wright Gemini 2 buses in London have been withdrawn.

== Response ==
The introduction of low emission vehicles in London has received praise from the Low Carbon Vehicle Partnership (LowCVP), which awarded Transport for London the first ever Low Carbon Champion Award for Buses in July 2010, and a joint award with Wrightbus for the development of the New Routemaster in 2013. On the 10th anniversary of LowCVP in 2013, TfL was awarded an Outstanding Achievement award for their work over the previous ten years – including the congestion charge, low emission zone as well as introduction of hybrid and hydrogen buses.

Research by operator Go-Ahead showed that people would be more likely to travel by bus if they knew the journey would be zero emission.

== Comparison ==
- As of June 2025, Paris has around 1,100 zero emission buses, 1,300 hybrid buses and 2,500 biomethane buses in service.
- As of December 2025, Moscow has over 2,700 electric buses in service.
- As of March 2025, New Delhi has around 3,190 CNG buses and 1,250 electric buses in service.
- As of May 2025, New York City has around 960 hybrid buses, 730 compressed natural gas (CNG) buses and 15 battery electric buses in service.
- As of March 2025, Los Angeles has around 2,000 CNG and 50 battery electric buses in service.

== See also ==
- Electric buses in Moscow
- Electric buses in China
- Low-emission buses in New York City
