= Death of Edson Da Costa =

2017 death in London

Edson Da Costa was a 25-year-old Black Portuguese man who died on 21 June 2017 after being stopped by police on 15 June in Beckton, London. The unclear circumstances of his death led to protests. In June 2019, an inquest jury found that Da Costa died by misadventure from the consequences of a cardiorespiratory arrest after he placed in his mouth a plastic bag containing 88 wraps of class A drugs. The coroner ruled that there was no "legal or factual basis" for a conclusion that could be critical of the police. An investigation by the Independent Office for Police Conduct concluded that the restraint by officers was necessary and proportionate.

The incident prompted a call for a review of first aid training and advice given to police officers for dealing with a person who is believed to have swallowed items.

== Background ==
Edir Frederico Da Costa was born in Portugal and had lived in the United Kingdom since 1996. He had a one-year-old son and was expecting his second child, due in January 2018.

=== Arrest and death ===
At about 10 pm on 15 June, Da Costa and two friends were stopped in their car on Tollgate Road in Beckton, London 10.05pm on 15 June 2017. At some point before or during being stopped by police officers in his Mercedes hire vehicle, Da Costa attempted to swallow a number of bags which were later found to contain crack cocaine and heroin. The officers restrained Da Costa using pressure point tactics and 'distraction blows'. Da Costa handcuffed with his arms behind his back and one officer used CS spray. Da Costa lost consciousness and a second team of officers arrived at the scene and carried out first aid. An ambulance was called and he was taken to hospital. Da Costa died in hospital on 21 June. A postmortem examination gave his cause of death as a lack of oxygen to the brain caused by a blocked airway and said there was no evidence of excess force being used against Da Costa.

== Response ==
In the immediate aftermath, a crowdfunding website was set which claimed Da Costa had his "neck broken in two places and head injuries". The Independent Police Complaints Commission said this was "false and potentially inflammatory information" and contacted Da Costa's family to share the pathologist’s findings which found that Da Costa did not suffer a bleed to the brain, a broken neck or any other spinal injury.

According to Da Costa's father, police suspected that the car had been involved in a robbery. During the stop, Da Costa was detained and was subdued with CS spray. He died on 21 June. According to a 2000 study, there had been no human deaths to that time attributed to CS spray, but it was thought to have potentially lethal effects depending on circumstances. A 1989 review published in JAMA found that CS can cause severe pulmonary damage and can also significantly damage the heart and liver.

=== Protests ===
On 25 June, friends and family of Da Costa organised a protest outside of the Forest Gate police station. The protests turned violent, with protesters throwing bricks ripped from a wall at police and lighting fires near the Stratford bus station. Fourteen police officers were injured and four people were arrested for charges including disorder, arson and criminal damage. Some of the protesters carried signs reading "Black Lives Matter", referring to a movement that had been started in the United States.

== IOPC investigation ==
The matter was referred to the Independent Office for Police Conduct (IPOC). The IPOC investigation concluded on 30 October that the use of force in restraining him was proportionate but one officer may have committed misconduct over his use of CS spray. The investigation found that and the reason for police stopping the Mercedes Da Costa was in was justified and the restraint by officers was deemed necessary and proportionate.

== Inquest ==
An inquest began in May 2019 in front of a jury at Walthamstow Coroner's Court. Before swearing-in, the jurors were asked whether they or any family members had been involved in any campaign groups such as Black Lives Matter. Over 30 witnesses were called to give evidence, including police officers and friends of Da Costa present when he was stopped. Claude Greenaway, also travelling in the car with Da Costa said he saw him put into a headlock by police trying to handcuff him. Greenaway has previous convictions for drug dealing, but denied being involved in drug dealing that day and denied knowing Da Costa had drugs on him. A Lucozade bottle containing ammonia was also found in the vehicle.

Officers used pressure point tactics in Da Costa's neck to restrain him, as well as CS spray and gave evidence that strikes were used due to fear of that Da Costa had a weapon. A police officer, known as G15, said he was not aware a colleague had used CS spray on Da Costa, and initially did not believe the situation was a medical emergency until the armed police officers began performing first aid and CPR. Three of the officers involved in the incident said CS spray was used before noticing Da Costa had drugs in his mouth, although one heard mention of the drugs before spray was used. All officers stated they did not see Da Costa place anything in his mouth, but after seeing that he had, told him to "spit it out" and used a pressure point in his neck to force him to open his mouth. Joanne Caffrey, a specialist in police restraint, said it was not necessary for officers use pressure point tactics in his neck while attempting to restrain Da Costa. She also said police failed to nominate a 'safety officer' to ensure that safety procedures were followed.

Professor Jerry Nolan of the Resuscitation Council said that Da Costa most likely went into cardiac arrest very soon after being stopped and before he was placed in the recovery position. Nolan said it would have been difficult to tell whether Da Costa violent behaviour were him trying to escape or that he was struggling to breathe and since he was in handcuffs, it was difficult for him alert officers that he was choking. Nolan said it was "theoretically possible" that the use of CS spray can make airway obstruction worse and "in theory" could have contributed to his death. However, Nolan said the resuscitation made by police officers was "exceptionally good".

After police called for an ambulance, paramedics were incorrectly told by a communications officer that the incident was in Surrey. The officer soon corrected the mistake but this was not shared with paramedics until a second police officer saw the error. Paramedics arrived 11 minutes after the initial call.

The senior coroner, Nadia Persaud, gave guidance to the jury that "taking into account all of the evidence, there is no legal or factual basis for reaching a factual conclusion which is critical of the police." On 6 June, the jury returned the verdict of death by misadventure, primarily attributed to an accident that occurred due to Da Costa swallowing a plastic bag containing 88 wraps of class A drugs.

== See also ==
- Death of Rashan Charles
- Killing of Mark Duggan
