= Roshon =

Roshon is a masculine given name. Notable people with the name include:

- Roshon Fegan (born 1991), American actor, rapper and dancer
- Roshon Gittens (born 2002), Barbadian footballer
- Roshon Primus (born 1995), Barbadian cricketer
- Kevin Roshon Samuels (1969–2022), American internet personality and image consultant
- Roshon van Eijma (born 1998), Curaçaoan footballer

== See also ==
- Rashon
- Rashan, Rashaan
- Rashaun, Rashawn
