= Resan (disambiguation) =

Resan (Swedish: Journey) is a 1987 documentary film by Peter Watkins. Resan may also refer to

- Resan bort, a 1945 Swedish drama film
- Resan till dej (The Journey to You), a 1953 Swedish comedy film
- Den ständiga resan, 1992 studio album by Swedish singer-songwriter Marie Fredriksson
- "Resan till dig", a 2011 single by Belarusian-Norwegian artist Alexander Rybak

== See also ==
- Rasan (disambiguation) or Resan, an Arabic name
