= Rahsaan =

Given name

Rahsaan is a masculine given name. Notable people with the name include:

- Rahsaan Bahati (born 1982), American racing cyclist
- Rahsaan Johnson (born 1978), American basketball player
- Rahsaan Roland Kirk (1935–1977), American jazz multi-instrumentalist
- Rahsaan Noor (born 1986), American film actor and filmmaker
- Rahsaan Patterson (born 1974), American singer and actor
- Rahsaan Smith (born 1973), American basketball player
- Aaron Rahsaan Thomas, American TV and film screenwriter, producer, and university teacher
- Rahsaan Thomas (born 1970), American journalist, writer and filmmaker

== See also ==
- Rahsaan Rahsaan, live album by jazz multi-instrumentalist Rahsaan Roland Kirk
- Rashaan
- Rasan (disambiguation)
