= Rashan (given name) =

Rashan is a masculine given name. Notable people with the name include:

- Rashan Charles (1996/1997 – 2017), British man who died during a police arrest
- Rashan Gary (born 1997), American football player
- Rashan Peiris (born 1982), Sri Lankan cricketer

== See also ==
- Rashaan, given name
- Rashaun, given name
- Rashawn, given name
- Rashon, given name
- Roshon, given name
