= Rashawn =

Rashawn is a masculine given name. Notable people with the given name include:

- Rashawn Dally (born 1997), Jamaican-American football player
- Rashawn Griffin (born 1980), American visual artist, educator
- Rashawn Jackson (born 1987), American football player
- Rashawn McCarthy (born 1989), Filipino-American basketball player
- Rashawn Ray, American sociologist
- Rashawn Ross (born 1979), American trumpeter and arranger
- Rashawn Scott (disambiguation), multiple people
- Rashawn Slater (born 1999), American football player
- RaShawn Stores (born 1991), American basketball coach and player
- Rashawn Thomas (born 1994), American basketball player

== See also ==
- Rashan (given name)
- Rashaan, given name
- Rashaun, given name
- Roshon, given name
