= London Bridge bus station =

Bus station in London, England

Coordinates: 51.50561°N 0.08687°W

London Bridge Bus Station
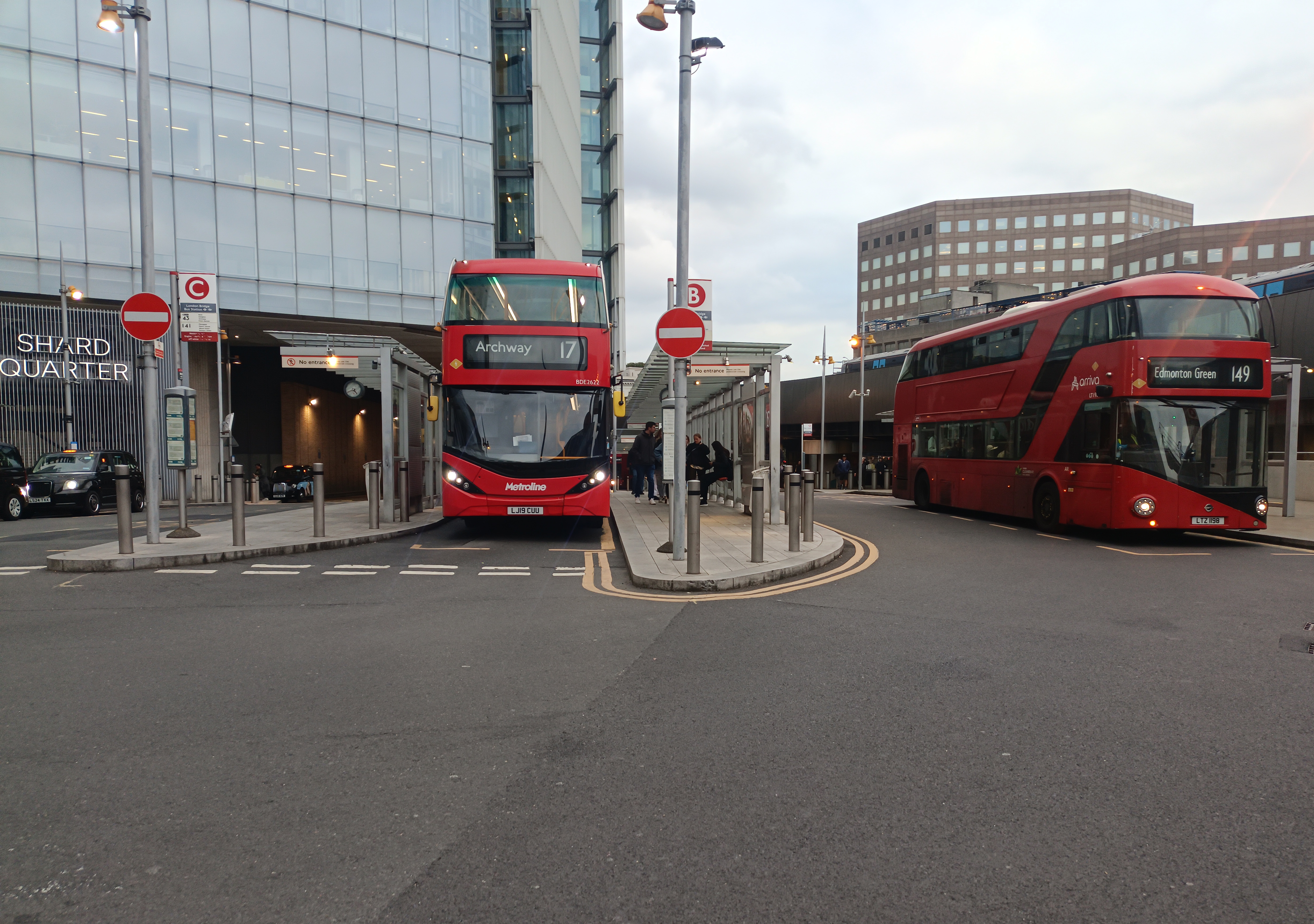
- The bus station in 2025

General information
- Location: London Bridge; Southwark
- Operator: Transport for London
- Bus stands: 3
- Bus operators: Stagecoach London; Metroline; Arriva London; Go-Ahead London; Transport UK London Bus
- Connections: London Bridge station
Location

London Bridge bus station serves the London Bridge area of the city of London and is situated at the London Bridge tube and rail station.

There are three stands at the station which are situated on the station forecourt.

London Buses routes 17, 43, 141, 149 and 388 serve the station.

== New bus station ==
A new bus station was built as part of the new Shard London Bridge "Gem" development which was open in 2012.

== See also ==
- List of bus and coach stations in London
