= London Buses route 388 =

London bus route

388
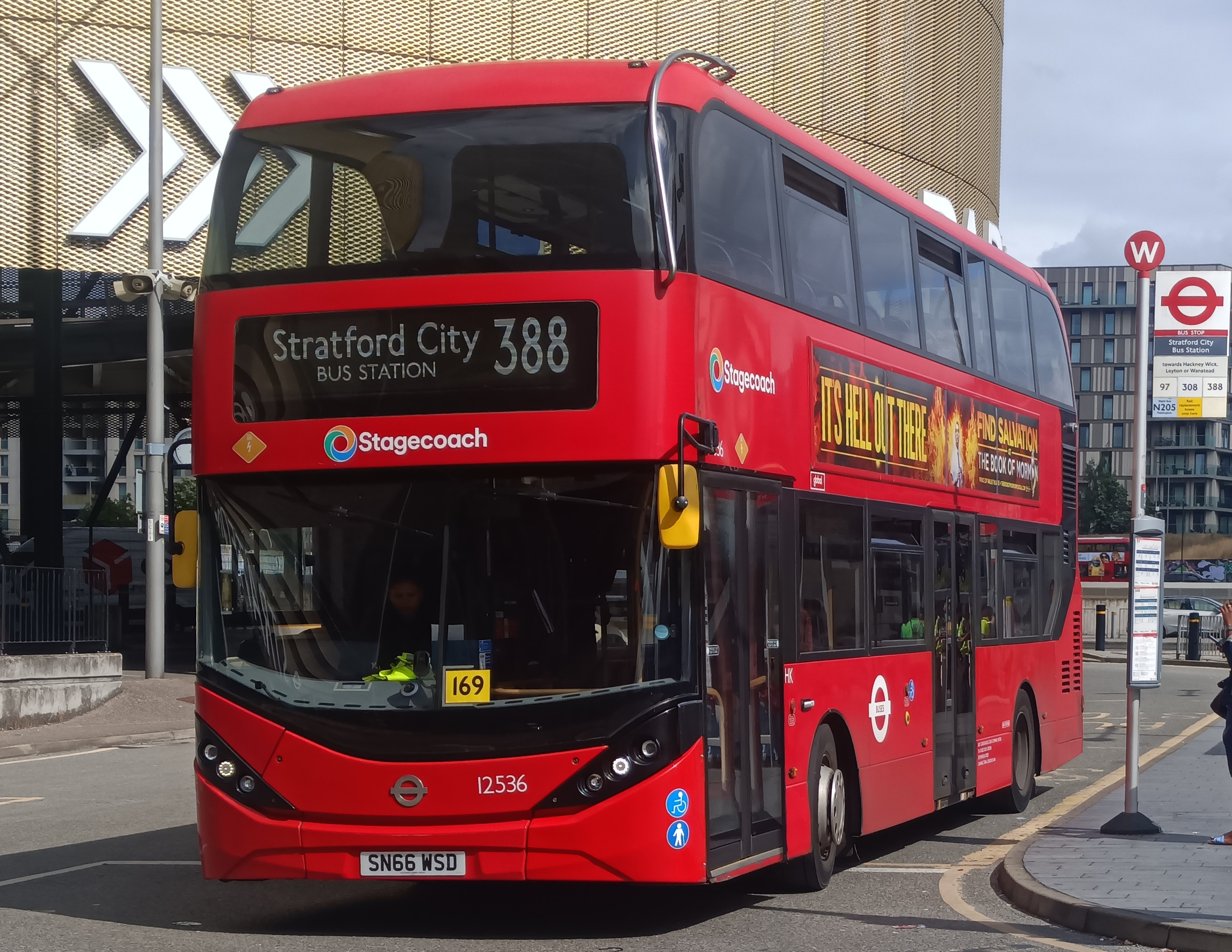
- East London Alexander Dennis Enviro400H City at Stratford City bus station in July 2025

Overview
- Operator: East London (Stagecoach London)
- Garage: Ash Grove
- Vehicle: Alexander Dennis Enviro400H City
- Peak vehicle requirement: 11

Route
- Start: London Bridge bus station
- Via: Bank Junction; Bethnal Green; Hackney Wick; Queen Elizabeth Olympic Park
- End: Stratford City bus station
- Length: 8 miles (13 km)

Service
- Level: Daily
- Frequency: About every 10-12 minutes

London Buses route 388 is a Transport for London contracted bus route in London, England. Running between London Bridge and Stratford City bus stations, it is operated by Stagecoach London subsidiary East London.

== History ==
Route 388 commenced operating on 25 January 2003 between Hackney Wick and Mansion House station in preparation for the introduction of the London congestion charge. It was operated by CT Plus' Ash Grove (HK) with East Lancs Lolyne bodied Dennis Trident 2s.

On 25 September 2004, it was extended to Blackfriars station. While Blackfriars station was rebuilt as part of the Thameslink Programme, route 388 was extended on 16 August 2008 to Temple station, and again on 1 November 2008 to Embankment station. It was cut back to Blackfriars on 24 March 2012.

Upon being re-tendered, the route was retained with a new contract commencing in January 2010.

On 14 December 2013, route 388 was extended from Hackney Wick to Stratford City bus station via the Queen Elizabeth Olympic Park, replacing route 588.

In 2017, the route was extended from Blackfriars to Elephant and Castle.

On 12 October 2019, the route was withdrawn between Liverpool Street and Elephant and Castle and instead rerouted towards London Bridge to partially replace route 48.

On 27 August 2022, route 388 was included in the sale of HCT Group's ‘red bus’ operations to East London.

== Current route ==
Route 388 operates via these primary locations:

- London Bridge bus station
- Monument station
- Liverpool Street station
- Bishopsgate
- Shoreditch High Street station
- Bethnal Green station
- York Hall
- Cambridge Heath station
- South Hackney
- Victoria Park
- Hackney Wick
- Here East
- Queen Elizabeth Olympic Park
- Stratford City bus station for Stratford station
