= List of bus and coach stations in London =

This is an alphabetical list of bus and coach stations in London.

Bus station	Location	Local authority	Image
Addington Village Interchange	Addington	Croydon	
Aldgate bus station	Aldgate	City of London	
Beckton bus station	Beckton	Newham	
Becontree Heath bus station	Becontree Heath	Barking and Dagenham	
Brent Cross bus station	Brent Cross	Barnet	
Canada Water bus station	Canada Water	Southwark	
Canning Town bus station	Canning Town	Newham	
Chingford bus station	Chingford	Waltham Forest	
Cromwell Road bus station	Kingston upon Thames	Kingston upon Thames	
Crystal Palace bus station	Crystal Palace	Bromley	
Dalston Junction bus station	Dalston	Hackney	
East Croydon bus station	Croydon	Croydon	
Edgware bus station	Edgware	Barnet	
Eltham bus station	Eltham	Greenwich	
Euston bus station	Euston	Camden	
Fairfield bus station	Kingston upon Thames	Kingston upon Thames	
Finsbury Park Interchange	Finsbury Park	Islington	
Hammersmith bus station	Hammersmith	Hammersmith and Fulham	
Harrow bus station	Harrow	Harrow	
Hatton Cross tube station	Hatton	Hillingdon	
Heathrow Central bus station	Heathrow Airport	Hillingdon	
Hounslow bus station	Hounslow	Hounslow	
Leytonstone bus station	Leytonstone	Waltham Forest	
Liverpool Street bus station	Broadgate	City of London	
London Bridge bus station	London Bridge	Southwark	
North Finchley bus station	North Finchley	Barnet	
North Greenwich bus station	Greenwich Peninsula	Greenwich	
Orpington bus station	Orpington	Bromley	
Peckham bus station	Peckham	Southwark	
Richmond bus station	Richmond	Richmond upon Thames	
Romford Brewery bus station	Romford	Havering	
Stratford bus station	Stratford	Newham	
Stratford City bus station	Stratford City	Newham	Stagecoach Bus at Stratford City Bus Station
Tottenham Hale bus station	Tottenham Hale	Haringey	
Turnpike Lane bus station	Harringay	Haringey	
Uxbridge bus station	Uxbridge	Hillingdon	
Vauxhall bus station	Vauxhall	Lambeth	
Victoria bus station	Victoria	Westminster	
Victoria coach station	Victoria	Westminster	
Walthamstow bus station	Walthamstow Central	Waltham Forest	
West Croydon bus station	Croydon	Croydon	
White City bus station	White City	Hammersmith and Fulham	
Wimbledon bus station	Wimbledon	Merton	

== See also ==
- List of bus garages in London
- List of bus stations in England
- List of bus stations in Scotland
- List of bus stations in Wales
