= The Low Carbon Vehicle Partnership =

The Low Carbon Vehicle Partnership (LowCVP) was announced by the UK Government in 2002 as an element of its Powering Future Vehicles Strategy. The purpose of the LowCVP is support reduction of carbon emissions from road transport in the UK with a clear focus on accelerating the adoption of low carbon vehicles and fuels; other strategies for reducing transport carbon emissions, for example modal shift towards cycling and walking or reducing traffic congestion through intelligent transport systems are out of scope and are the preserve of other bodies who are more expert in those fields. The UK government has set a target for reducing overall greenhouse gas emissions and recognises that achieving its target will require emissions from road transport, which are significant, to be cut.

== Organization ==
The LowCVP is a public-private membership organisation which operates by bringing significant stakeholders together to provide broad-based expert commentary on the issues, to stimulate promising initiatives, and to encourage lower carbon vehicle and fuel technologies and businesses. Membership is open to organisations with a stake in the UK's move to low carbon vehicles and fuels who agree with its principles and commitments; some 200 organisations were members in 2015 drawn from industry, academic institutions, consumer groups and non-governmental organisations (NGOs). This diversity of stakeholders holding a common interest in low carbon vehicles and fuels, and willing to work together to tackle current issues, is a distinguishing feature of the LowCVP and one of the reasons that it receives UK government funding. LowCVP has a Board of Directors, a Members' Council and a Secretariat.

== Programmes ==
The LowCVP has contributed to many relevant issues since it was formed, amongst these the implementation of Vehicle Labelling to inform buyers of the fuel economy of new and used cars, programmes to bring low emission buses into use (such as hybrid buses in London), an evaluation of the success of UK government intervention to promote the development of low carbon vehicle technology, and work to advise government on biofuel issues.

== Low Carbon Champions Awards ==
The organization gives the Low Carbon Champions Awards to celebrate innovation in reducing road transport emissions. The award is one of the few sustainable development awards that are accredited by the Royal Society of the Arts (RSA).
