= London Buses route 141 =

London bus route

141
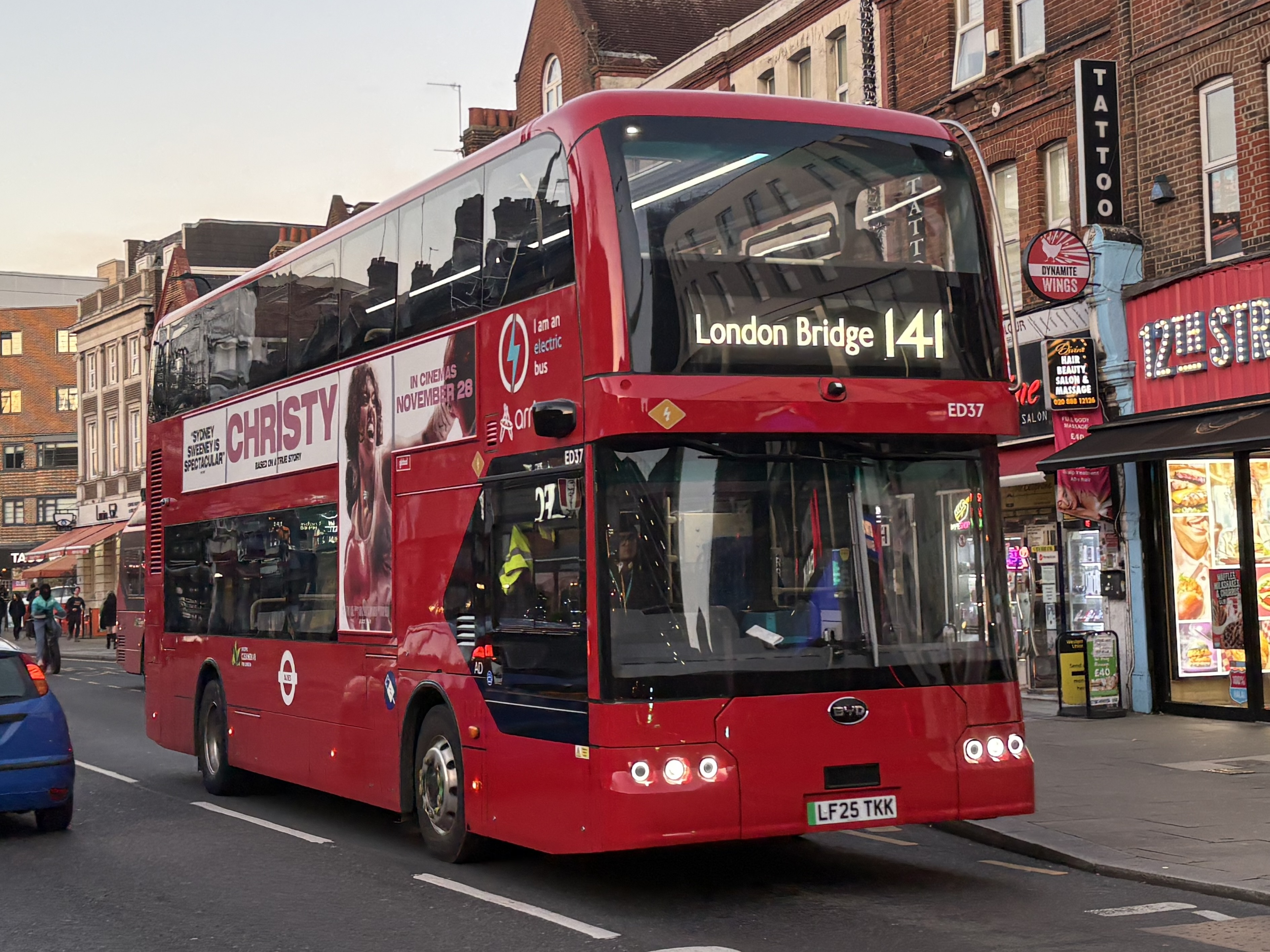
- Arriva London BYD BD11B in Wood Green in November 2025

Overview
- Operator: Arriva London
- Garage: Palmers Green
- Vehicle: BYD BD11B

Route
- Start: London Bridge bus station
- Via: Moorgate; Hoxton; Newington Green; Manor House; Harringay; Turnpike Lane; Wood Green
- End: Palmers Green

London Buses route 141 is a Transport for London contracted bus route in London, England. Running between London Bridge bus station and Palmers Green, it is operated by Arriva London.

== History ==
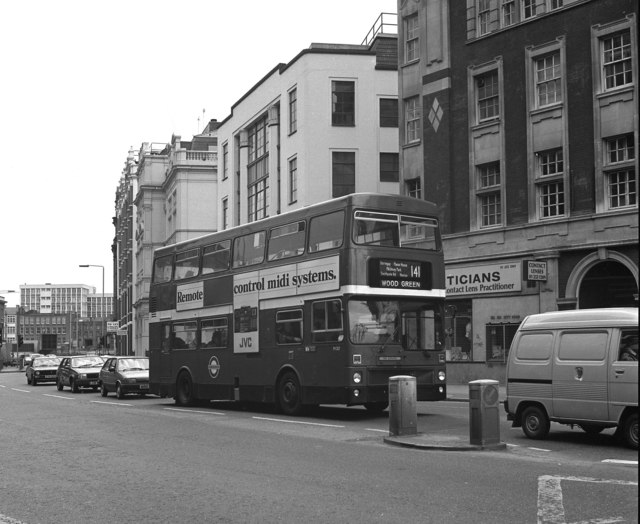
MCW Metrobus on Old Street in March 1988

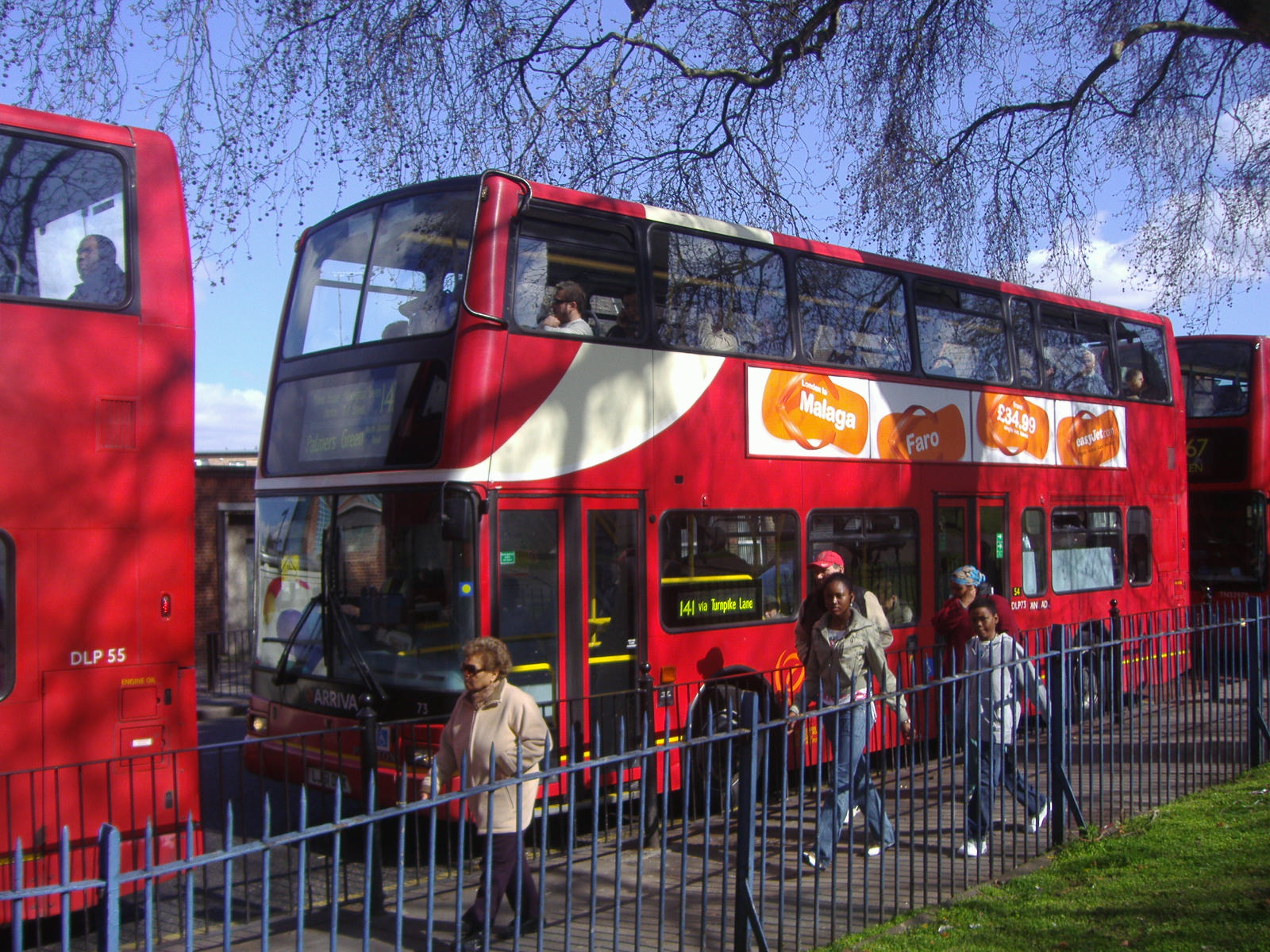
Arriva London Plaxton President bodied DAF DB250 in April 2008

The route was retained by Arriva London with a contract awarded in May 2005.

Route 141 was the first route to be served by hybrid electric double-decker buses, with the first one entering service in March 2007.

A bus operating on route 141 was involved in an accident near Monument station on 24 February 2010. Eleven people including the driver were injured when the bus crashed into a set of railings and narrowly avoided falling down the steps into the station.

Upon being re-tendered, route 141 was retained by Arriva London with a new contract commencing on 12 January 2013. In August 2014, a bus on the route was used to test technology that displays seat availability on a screen at the base of the stairs.

== Current route ==
Route 141 operates via these primary locations:

- London Bridge bus station for London Bridge station
- London Bridge
- Monument station
- Bank station
- Moorgate station
- Old Street station
- Hoxton
- Newington Green
- Manor House station
- Harringay Green Lanes station
- Turnpike Lane station
- Wood Green station
- Palmers Green North Circular Road
