= Death of Rashan Charles =

2017 death in England

Rashan Charles

Rashan Jermaine Charles, a 20-year-old British man, died on 22 July 2017 following contact with an officer from the Metropolitan Police in Dalston, England. Charles died after swallowing and choking on a package containing caffeine and Paracetamol, after being chased and restrained by a police officer.

This was the second death in little more than a month of a young black man in London following police contact, after the death of Edson Da Costa. The footage of Charles being restrained was shared on social media As with Da Costa's death, it led to multiple protests. An inquest in June 2018 concluded that Charles had died as a result of the object obstructing his airway, and that the officers were not responsible.

== Background ==
The Metropolitan Police said the incident took place after a vehicle stop in Kingsland Road, Dalston at 1:45 am on Saturday, 22 July 2017. Charles fled the vehicle and was pursued by police into a shop, where he placed an object into his mouth and resisted arrest.

The officer, who wore a body camera, threw Charles to the ground, held him down by the neck, and tried to reach inside his mouth. A member of the public helped him restrain Charles. Charles subsequently "became ill", was given emergency treatment at the scene, and was taken by ambulance to Royal London Hospital, where he died later that morning. The object Charles tried to swallow was reportedly recovered at the scene.

== Response ==
The video of Charles' contact with the police was widely shared on social media platforms. The National Union of Students Black Students' Campaign tweeted that Charles had been "murdered" by the Metropolitan Police.

Pauline Pearce, a local politician and activist who was known for berating looters during the 2011 London riots, described Charles as "a darling". Friends and family of Charles called for action to be taken against the officer involved, suggesting protests could take place otherwise. A friend of Charles told The Independent, "Rash was unarmed and he was not resisting arrest...I just don't understand the whole taking him down to the ground and choking him and handcuffing him" and accused police of abusing their authority. The Independent reported that "community anger over his death could spill over into violence".

=== Protests ===
More than 300 protesters attended a demonstration organised by 'Hackney Stand Up to Racism and Fascism' on Monday 24 July. The group stated they were "enormously concerned and angered" by Charles' death and cited both the Death of Edson Da Costa and of Rashan Charles as examples of "seemingly endless list of young black men dying at the hands of the authorities". The protest, a march from the shop where the altercation took place to Stoke Newington police station, was described as mostly peaceful, but several masked activists chanted "murderers" at police and hurled broken bottles.

More protests were held in Dalston and Hackney on Friday, 28 July 2017.

== IOPC Investigation ==
The Independent Police Complaints Commission (later renamed the Independent Office for Police Conduct in January 2018) started an investigation. The IPCC reported that the item Charles attempted to swallow contained a mixture of caffeine and Paracetamol (acetaminophen) wrapped in plastic. Although these are not illegal to possess in the UK, this combination of drugs has been used as "cutting" agents for Class A drugs.

=== Inquest ===
The full inquest, was held in June 2018 in front of a coroner and jury. The police officers involved in the restraint and arrest of Charles that resulted in his death were given the right to remain anonymous.

On Wednesday 20 June 2018, the jury returned a verdict of accidental death. The jury concluded that the officers' use of force was justified and that Charles' death was a consequence of the package he had swallowed blocking his airway. While they concluded that the officers failed to follow protocol by not calling for an ambulance sooner, they argued that this would not have saved Charles' life. The verdict was criticized by at least one member of Charles' family.

== See also ==
- Death of Edson Da Costa
- Killing of Mark Duggan
