= Rashaun =

Rashaun is a masculine given name. Notable people with the given name include:

- Rashaun Agee (born 2000), American basketball player
- Rashaun Allen (born 1990), American football player
- Rashaun Broadus (born 1984), American basketball player
- Rashaun Freeman (born 1984), American basketball player
- Rashaun Kemp, American politician
- Rashaun Simonise (born 1995), American football player
- Rashaun Weaver (born 2005), one of the murderers of Tessa Majors
- Rashaun Woods (born 1980), American football player

== See also ==
- Rashan (given name)
- Rashaan, given name
- Rashawn, given name
- Roshon, given name
