= Alexander Dennis Enviro400 City =

Low-floor double-decker bus

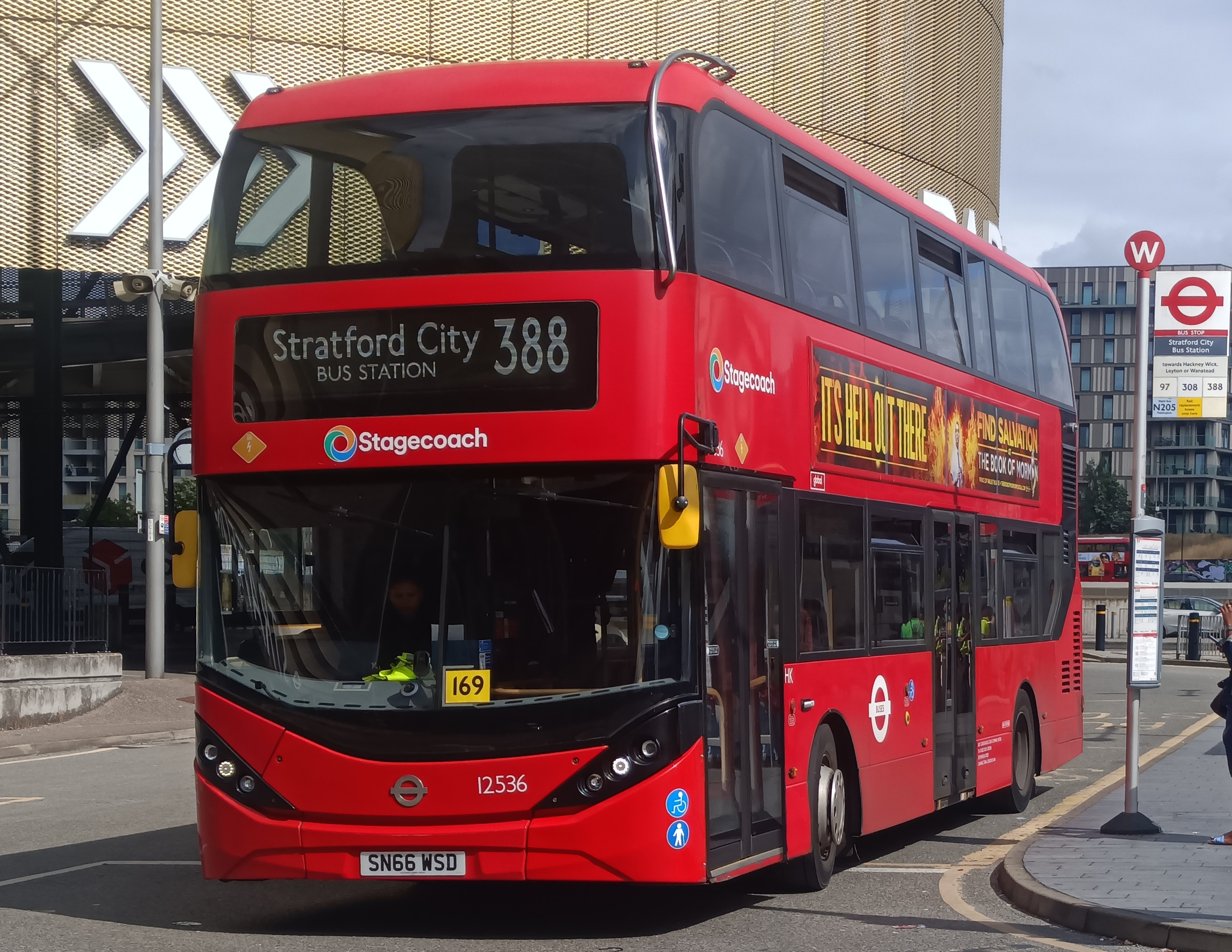
- Stagecoach London Alexander Dennis Enviro400H City on route 388 at Stratford City bus station in July 2025

Overview
- Manufacturer: Alexander Dennis
- Production: 2015–present

Body and chassis
- Doors: Single or dual door
- Floor type: Low floor
- Chassis: Integral, Scania N series
- Related: Alexander Dennis Enviro400EV; Alexander Dennis Enviro400 MMC

Powertrain
- Engine: Cummins ISBe (Enviro400 MMC); Scania DC09 (Scania N2x0UD)
- Capacity: 64–100 seated

Dimensions
- Length: 10.3 m (33 ft 10 in) to 11.5 m (37 ft 9 in)
- Width: 2.55 m (8 ft 4 in)
- Height: 4.2 m (13 ft 9 in) to 4.3 m (14 ft 1 in)
- Curb weight: 11 tonnes (10.8 long tons; 12.1 short tons)

Chronology
- Predecessor: Alexander Dennis Enviro400

The Alexander Dennis Enviro400 City is a low-floor double-decker bus produced by the British bus manufacturer Alexander Dennis since 2015, as an alternative to the standard Alexander Dennis Enviro400 MMC bodywork. The Enviro400 City is produced at Alexander Dennis' Falkirk and Scarborough factories in the United Kingdom. It is available as a complete integral diesel or hybrid bus, as well as the Scania N280UD compressed natural gas-powered chassis.

== Introduction ==
The Enviro400 City can trace its design roots back to 1997, with the introduction of the Dennis Trident 2, one of the first low-floor double-decker buses to enter service. The model saw immense success at the turn of the millennium, despite financial difficulties facing Dennis Specialist Vehicles during this period. As a result of these, production of the Trident 2 passed first to TransBus International in 2001 and then to Alexander Dennis in 2004.

Alexander Dennis updated the basic Trident 2 chassis to launch the Alexander Dennis Enviro400 in 2005 – the basic chassis was still internally badged as a Trident. A second-generation Enviro400 was launched in 2009, with facelifted styling and updated chassis design, which finally dropped the Trident moniker. The second-generation Enviro400 was overhauled again to create the Enviro400 MMC, which was launched as the classic model's eventual replacement in 2014. Production of the Enviro400 ceased in 2018.

In late 2015, Alexander Dennis launched the Enviro400 City, a premium model of the Enviro400 MMC, featuring a restyled front end to match the single-decker Enviro200 MMC and a glass staircase as standard amongst other features, designed to compete with the New Routemaster and Wright SRM designs in the London bus market.

== Powertrain variants ==
=== Conventional diesel ===
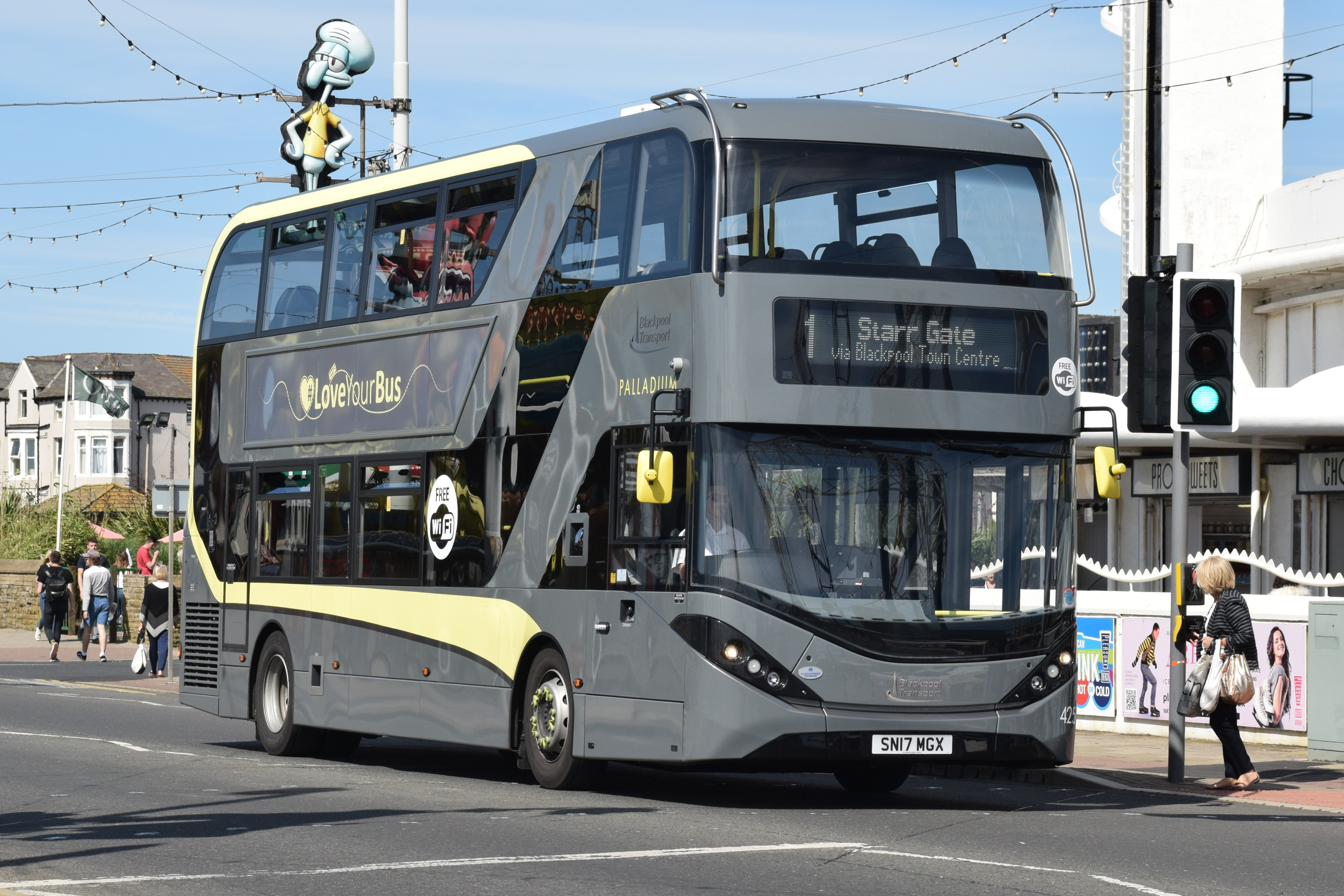
Blackpool Transport Enviro400 City at Pleasure Beach in July 2017

Blackpool Transport became the first operator outside London to order the Enviro400 City on conventional diesel-powered chassis in January 2016, with the new buses upgrading the operator's 9 service to high-specification 'Palladium' standard. Other orders were delivered to Uno of Hertfordshire in 2017, branded for The Comet routes 614 and 644; Arriva Buses Wales, with 13 buses also delivered in 2017 for Arriva Sapphire services in Wrexham; Plymouth Citybus, which ordered 27 for its busier services (16 in 2017, with all but one featuring 'Spark' route branding for the 21/21A/21B services; and 11 in 2019, predominantly used on the 42/42A/42C services); Bluestar, which had 20 delivered in 2018 for its 18 service, and First Glasgow, with 10 for its 500 Glasgow Airport Express in 2019.

Two Enviro400 City buses were uniquely built for high-specification private hire use for the independent operator Southern Transit in April 2018, nicknamed 'Citymasters' by the operator. Another was delivered to Delaine Buses in October 2023, the operator's first new Alexander Dennis double-decker, with two more delivered between September 2024 and March 2025.

In February 2023, Reading Buses ordered seven 11.5 m (38 ft) Enviro400 City buses, the first of the type to be built to this length, intended to be built with high-specification interiors with 76 seats for use on Green Line bus routes 702 and 703. These were delivered in June 2023 and coincided with routes 702 and 703 being rebranded the London Line and the Flight Line respectively. A further nine Enviro400 City buses were delivered in February 2024 for use on the Reading to Bracknell 'Lion' 4 and X4 services, followed in December 2024 by 15 more for use on 'jet black' route 1.

50 Enviro400 Citys built to Bee Network specification were delivered to Stagecoach Manchester between late 2024 and early 2025 as part of Tranche 3 the rollout of franchised bus services in Greater Manchester.

Nineteen Scania N250UDs with Enviro400 City bodies were delivered to First Eastern Counties for their flagship 'Excel' services in 2020, featuring high-specification interiors, next stop announcements and camera mirrors.

=== Enviro400H/ER ===
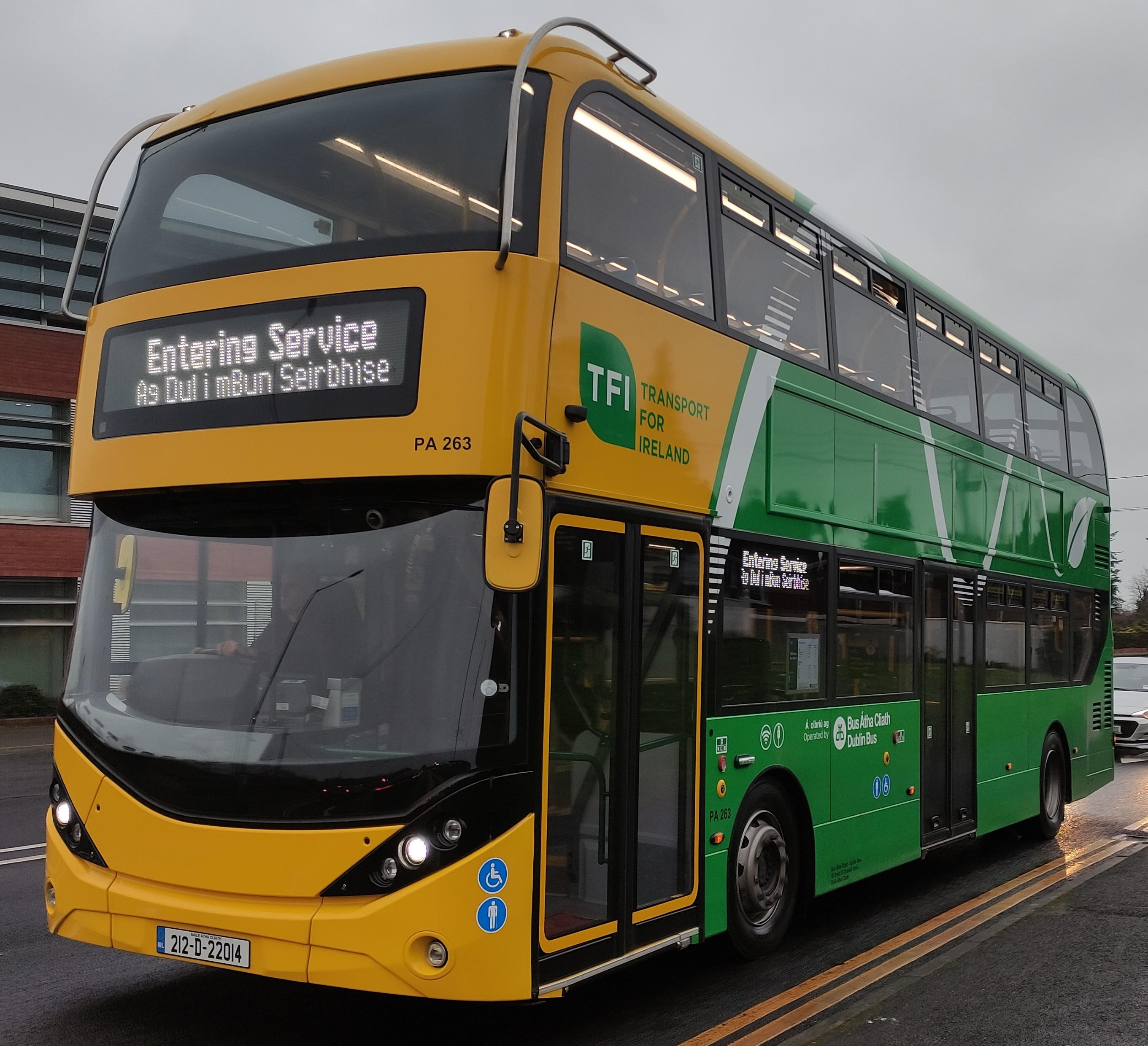
Enviro400ER operated by Dublin Bus on contract to TFI in December 2021

The Enviro400 City was initially launched on the Enviro400H hybrid electric platform developed by Alexander Dennis and BAE Systems, which was carried over from the previous Enviro400. The first production examples of the Enviro400 City entered service with Arriva London on route 78; a repeat order in 2016 would later see this fleet grow to a total of 53 Enviro400 City hybrids.

The HCT Group bought the hybrid model for its Transport for London 'red bus' contracts, taking delivery of 47 of the type between 2016 and early 2017 for service on routes 26 and 388, then nine more for operation on route 20 in 2019.

Transport for Ireland ordered 600 of the Enviro400ER model, the successor to the Enviro400H chassis launched in 2019. Delivery of the first 100 buses commenced in late 2020; all are to be supplied with City bodies.

=== Enviro400 City CBG ===
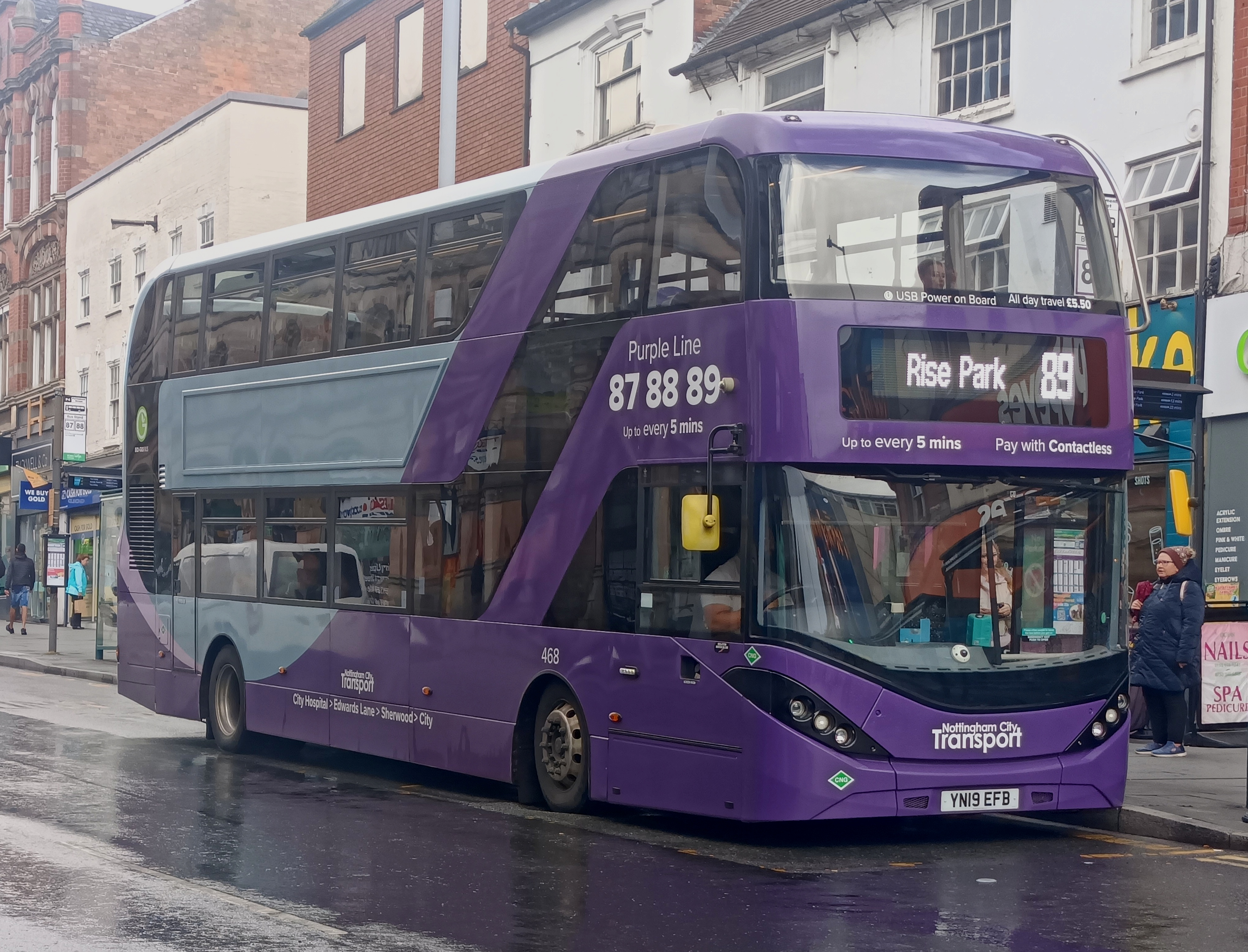
Nottingham City Transport Enviro400 City CBG at Nottingham City Centre in September 2025

The Enviro400 City CBG was launched in 2016 at the Euro Bus Expo, built on the Scania N280UD compressed natural gas-powered chassis. The CBG drivetrain was only available with the City body, although some earlier models were delivered with MMC bodies.

Nottingham City Transport has been the largest customer for the Enviro400 City CBG, taking delivery of 120 between 2017 and 2019 as part of a major fleet renewal programme; this made the company the largest operator of double-decker biogas buses in the world. An additional 23 Enviro400 City CBGs have been ordered for delivery in summer 2022, which the operator expects to be its last. 22 Enviro400 CBGs with both MMC and City bodies also entered service with Reading Buses between 2016 and 2018.

First West of England initially ordered an Enviro400 City CBG for services in Bristol in 2017, which was later followed by an order for 21 Enviro400 City CBGs for service on the Bristol MetroBus pink line m1. Due to First's Bristol depots being unable to support the route at the time, the buses were originally subcontracted out to CT Plus Bristol, although eventually Lawrence Hill Depot was upgraded to service such buses, and in September 2022 the original fleet passed to First, following financial difficulties faced by CT Plus. A further 77 Enviro400 City CBGs entered service with First West of England in early 2020.

== See also ==
- List of buses
