= Rashaan =

Rashaan is a masculine given name. Notable people with the name include:

- Rashaan Evans (born 1995), American football player
- Rashaan Fernandes (born 1989), Dutch footballer
- Rashaan Gaulden (born 1995), American football player
- Rashaan Jackson (born 1973), known as Buc Fifty and other names, American rapper
- Rashaan Jordan (born c. 1971), American college football coach
- Rashaan Melvin (born 1989), American football player
- Rashaan Nall (born 1980), American actor
- Rashaan Salaam (1974–2016), American football player
- Rashaan Shehee (born 1975), American football player

== See also ==
- Rashan (given name)
- Rashaun, given name
- Rashawn, given name
- Rahsaan, given name
- Roshon, given name
