= National Union of Students Black Students' Campaign =

NUS Black Students' Campaign
- Headquarters: Macadam House, Gray's Inn Road London
- National affiliation: National Union of Students

The National Union of Students Black Students' Campaign is a self-organised autonomous section of the National Union of Students (NUS). The NUS Black Students' Campaign represents students of African, Asian, Arab and Caribbean heritage.

== Priority campaigns ==
The National Union of Students Black Students' Campaign sets its policy at its annual democratic event, the Black Students' Campaign Summer Conference.

The four priority areas for the campaign are Black Representation, Anti-Racism and Anti-Fascism, Equality in Education, and International Peace and Justice.

In 2015, the organsiation backed a campaign against the government's counter-radicalisation policy.

== Structure ==
=== National Black Students’ Officer ===
The National Black Students’ Officer for the NUS Black Students’ Campaign is an elected full-time paid position who coordinates and leads the campaign. The elected officer also sits on the NUS National Executive Council. Former office holders include Malia Bouattia and Aaron Kiely.

=== Black Students' NEC Representative ===
The Black Students' NEC Representative sits on the NUS National Executive Council alongside the National Black Students’ Officer and is elected by all delegates at the NUS Black Students’ Campaign Summer Conference.

=== Nations Officers ===
NUS Scotland and NUS Wales each have a Black Students’ Officer elected by students resident at Scottish and Welsh institutions respectively. These Officers sit on the NUS Black Students’ Campaign National Committee as well as the NUS Scotland Executive Council and NUS Wales Executive Council. Both nations have their own independent committee and steering committees.

=== Further Education representative places ===
The Further Education representatives are elected by delegates who are in Further Education to represent FE students. To be eligible to stand to be a further education representative, the candidate must be in further education at the time of election. There are two reserved positions on the National Committee for Further Education students.

=== Disabled representative ===
The disabled representative is elected by a caucus of delegates to the NUS Black Students’ Campaign Summer Conference by delegates who self-define as disabled.

=== Women's representative places ===
The women's place representatives come from and are elected by a caucus of delegates who self-define as women. There is currently one reserved position on the National Committee and one reserved place for women from further education institutions and one reserved place for LBT women.

=== LGBT representative places ===
The LGBT place representatives come from and are elected by a caucus of delegates who self-define as Lesbian, Gay, Bi, Trans. There is currently one reserved position on the National Committee and one reserved place for a Black LGBT person who also self-defines as a woman.

=== Open place representatives ===
The open place representatives are elected by delegates and any delegate or observer is eligible to stand for these positions at the Summer Conference. There are three open place representative positions on the National Committee. They are elected by all delegates at the NUS Black Students’ Campaign Summer Conference.

=== Mature, postgraduate and international representatives ===
Mature, postgraduate and international students are guaranteed representation on the National Committee. There are reserved positions for Black mature, postgraduate and international students - with one Committee place reserved for each. Each position is elected by students at the Summer Conference by caucuses made up of students who define into those respective sections.

== Conferences ==
=== Winter Conference ===
The Winter Conference is a two-day training event held in the first academic term for Black students across the UK.

=== Summer Conference ===
The Summer Conference is an opportunity for Black student activists from across the UK to come together to set the direction for the campaign for the year ahead, to attend workshops and hear speakers, and to network with other Black students. It is the NUS Black Students’ Campaign's democratic event.

One of the key functions of the conference is to debate, pass policy which forms the basis of NUS Black Students’ Campaign campaigning agenda for the year ahead. Motions and amendments may be submitted by Black students from NUS constituent members.

At the conference there is the annual NUS Black Students’ Campaign Awards, which started in 2005, to help promote and support outstanding achievements of Black students in campaigning for liberation.

Officers and committee members are elected at the annual Summer conference by delegates.
