= London Buses route 43 =

London bus route

43
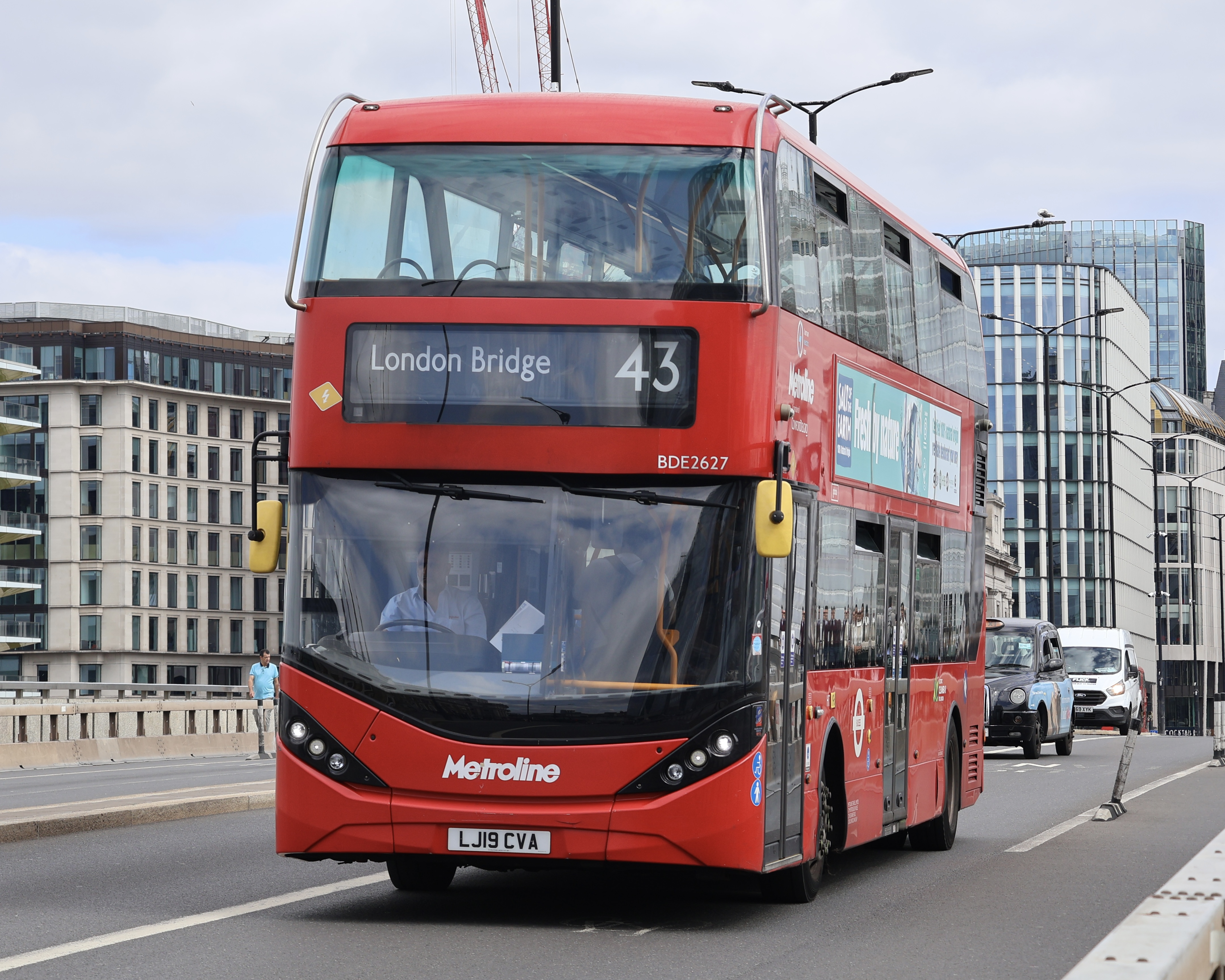
- Metroline BYD Alexander Dennis Enviro400EV on London Bridge in June 2025

Overview
- Operator: Metroline
- Garage: Holloway
- Vehicle: BYD Alexander Dennis Enviro400EV
- Peak vehicle requirement: Day: 26; Night: 5
- Night-time: 24-hour service

Route
- Start: Friern Barnet
- Via: Archway; Holloway; Angel; Moorgate
- End: London Bridge bus station

London Buses route 43 is a Transport for London contracted bus route in London, England. Running between Friern Barnet and London Bridge bus station, it is operated by Metroline.

== History ==
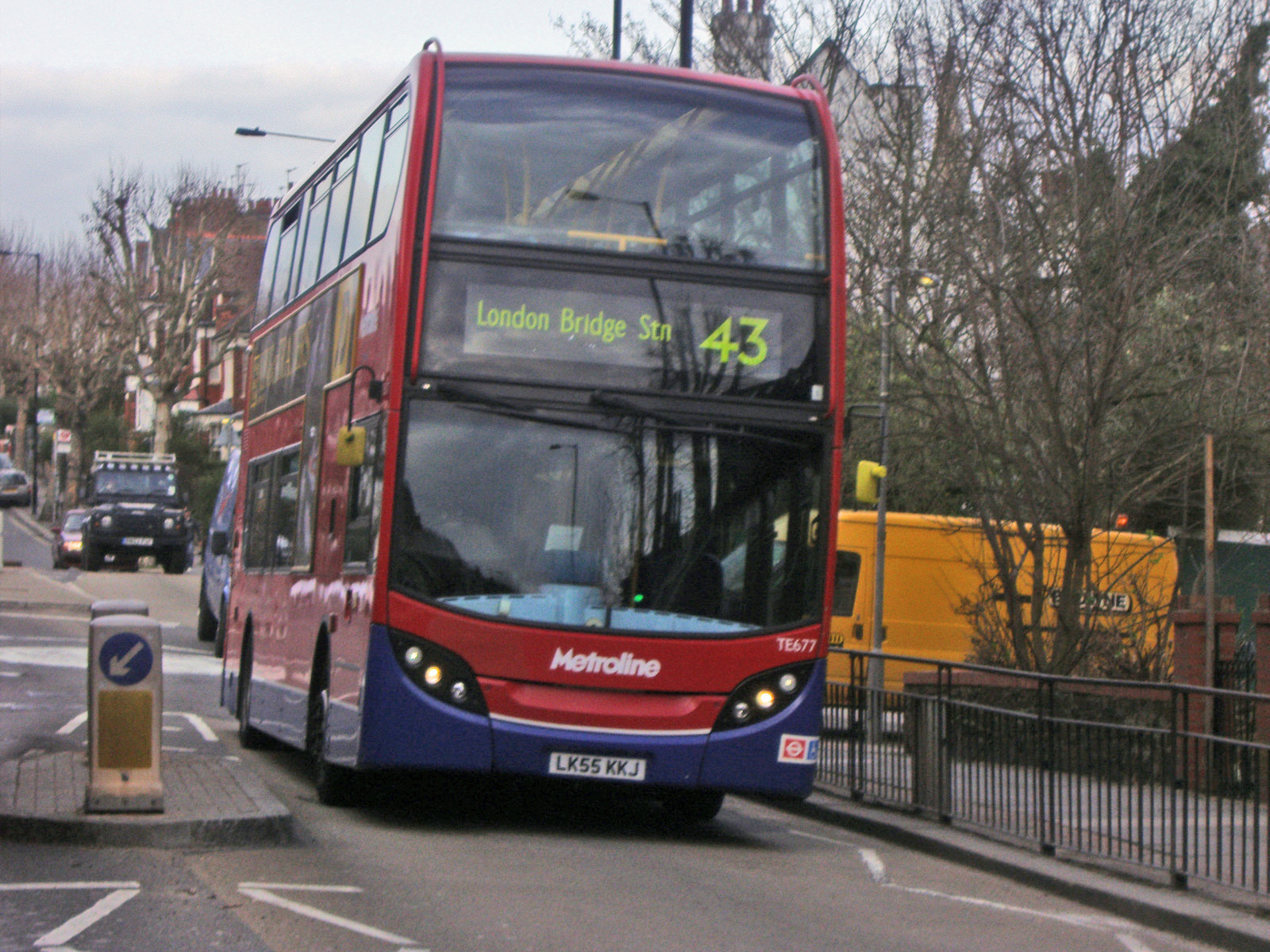
Metroline Alexander Dennis Enviro400 in Muswell Hill in March 2008

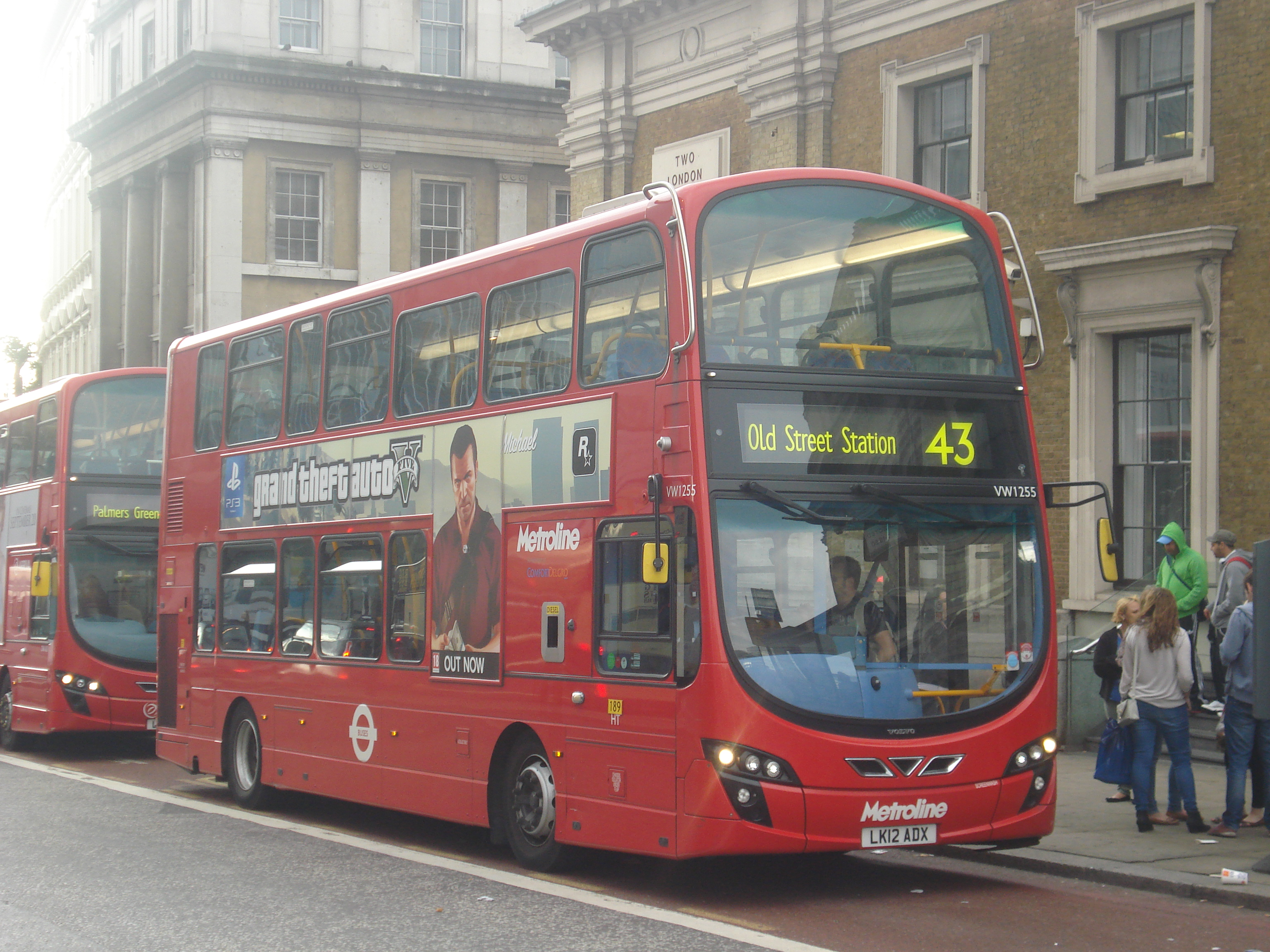
Metroline Wright Eclipse Gemini 2 bodied Volvo B9TL in September 2013

Route 43 commenced operating in August 1912 as a daily route between Archway station and London Bridge station via Holloway Road, Upper Street, Angel, City Road, Moorgate, Bank station and London Bridge, and was quickly extended to Muswell Hill Broadway via East Finchley and Fortis Green Road.

The route along which the 43 operates was designated as London's first Red Route bus priority scheme in 1992. Later, in late 1999, the route became one of the first in London to be operated by low-floor double-deck buses, when new Plaxton President bodied Dennis Trident 2s were introduced.

In July 2019, BYD Alexander Dennis Enviro400EV battery electric buses were introduced into service on the route, making it the first route served solely by zero emission double-decker buses.

In 2021, the frequency of the service was reduced from 9 buses per hour to 7.5 during Monday-Friday peak times, and from 8 buses per hour to 7.5 during Monday-Saturday daytimes.

== Variants ==
In 1992, a peak hour route X43 was introduced to supplement route 43, launched following a pilot Red Route bus priority scheme, running the length of the A1 corridor from Highgate to Old Street, that increased the speed and patronage of route 43. Branded as Red Express and operated by London Regional Transport's London Northern business unit, the X43 used specially liveried Alexander bodied Scania N113 double-deckers. London Northern stated that passenger numbers along the route increased by 8,700 in the year following its introduction.

== In popular culture ==
An Alexander Dennis Enviro400 operating on route 43 was used in the 2007 film The Bourne Ultimatum.

Route 43 is mentioned in the song "Bros" by North London alternative rock band Wolf Alice. A route 43 bus is shown at the very end of the music video for the song.

== Current route ==
Route 43 operates via these primary locations:

- Friern Barnet
- Colney Hatch
- Muswell Hill
- Highgate Wood
- Highgate station
- Archway station
- Upper Holloway station
- Holloway Nag's Head
- Holloway Road station
- Highbury & Islington station
- Angel station
- Moorfields Eye Hospital
- Old Street station
- Moorgate station
- Bank and Monument stations
- London Bridge bus station for London Bridge station
