= London Buses route 25 =

London bus route

25
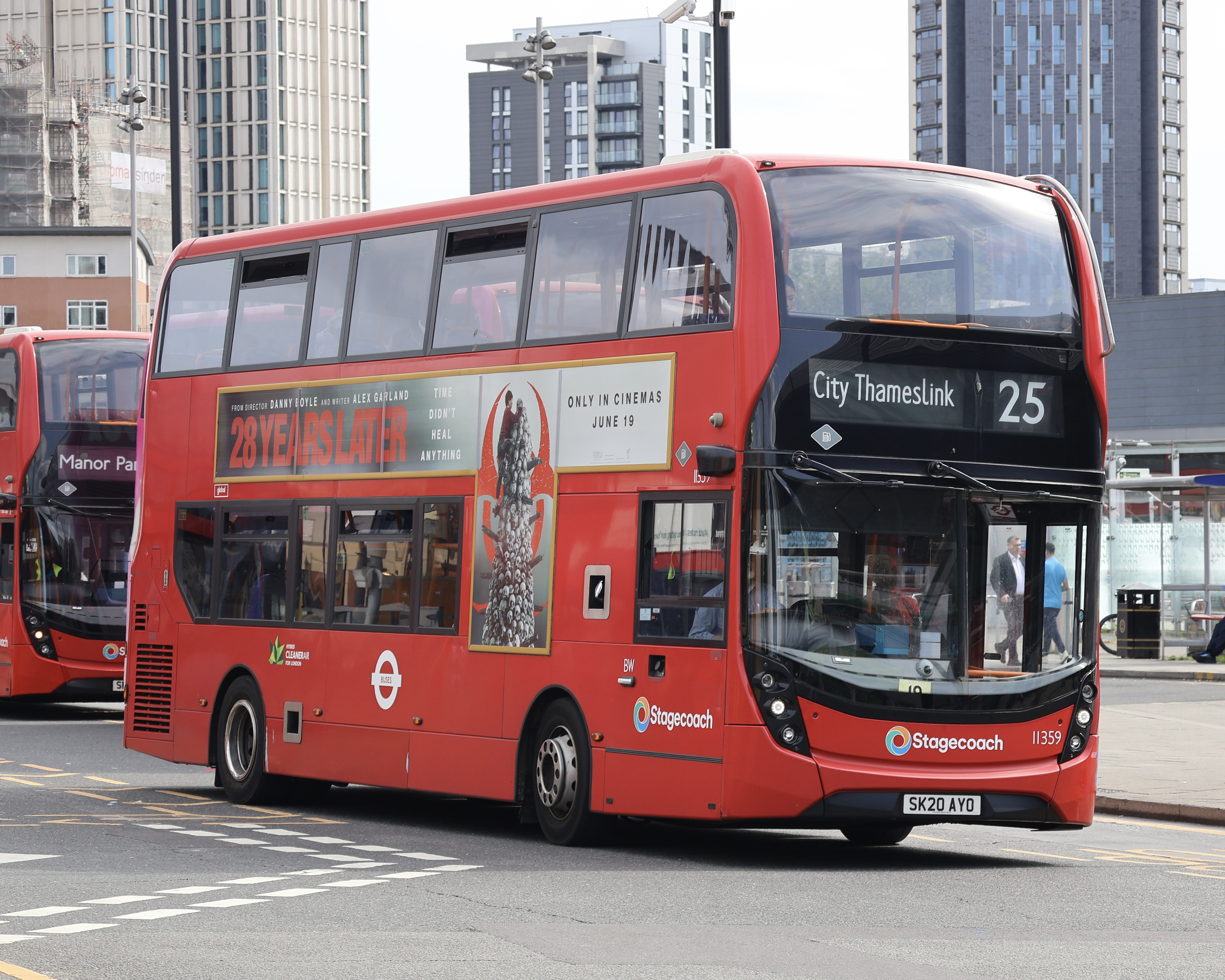
- East London Alexander Dennis Enviro400 MMC at Stratford bus station in June 2025

Overview
- Operator: East London (Stagecoach London)
- Garage: Bow
- Vehicle: Alexander Dennis Enviro400 MMC
- Peak vehicle requirement: 31
- Night-time: Night Bus N25

Route
- Start: Ilford
- Via: Manor Park; Stratford; Bow; Mile End; Aldgate; St Paul's
- End: Holborn Circus
- Length: 9.6 miles (15.4 km)

Service
- Level: Daily
- Frequency: About every 6-7 minutes
- Journey time: 64-100 minutes
- Operates: 04:10 until 01:32

London Buses route 25 is a Transport for London contracted bus route in London, England. Running between Ilford and Holborn Circus, it is operated by Stagecoach London subsidiary East London.

== History ==
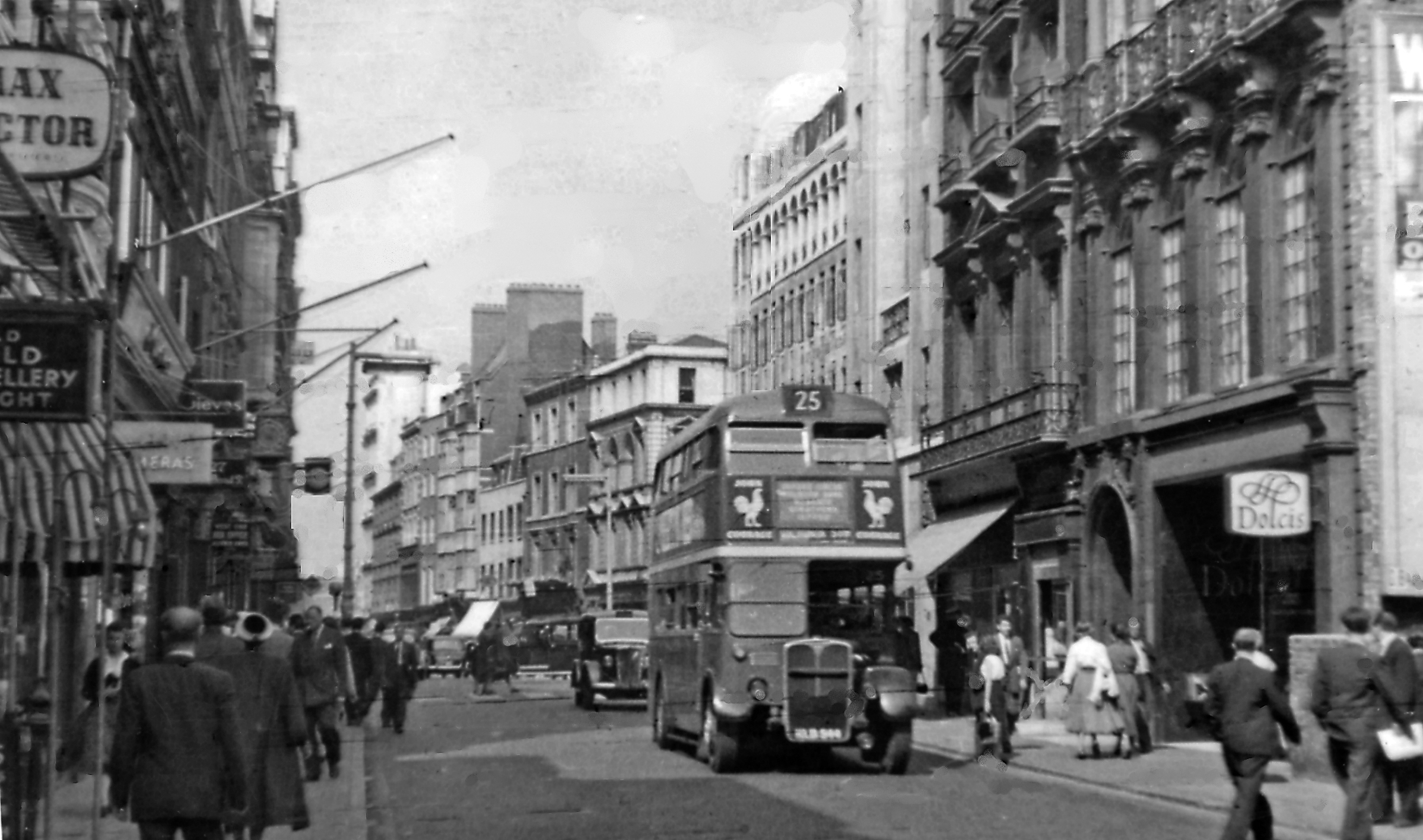
AEC Regent III RT on Bond Street in August 1955

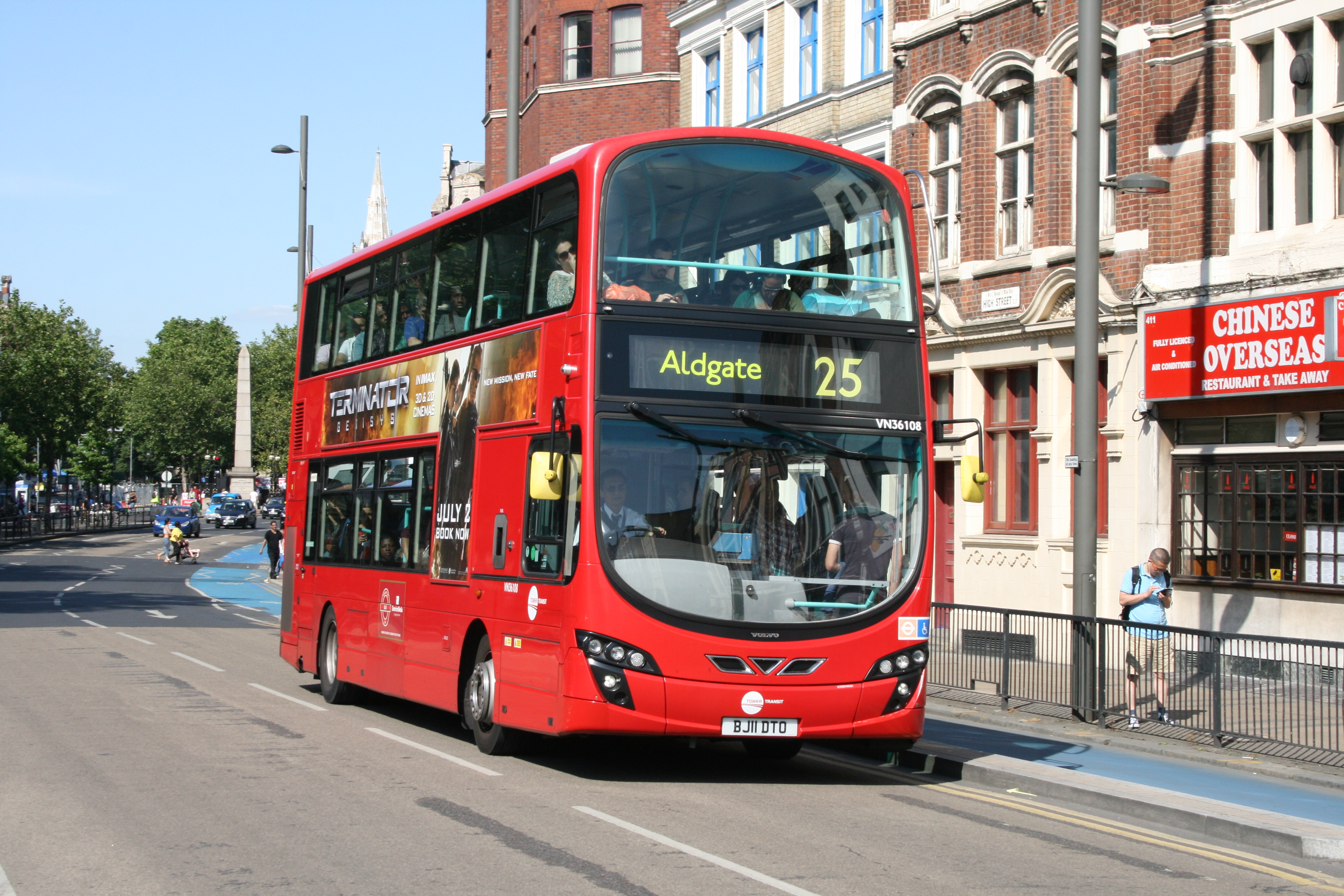
Tower Transit Wright Gemini 2 bodied Volvo B9TL in Stratford in July 2015

Route 25 began operation on 30 October 1910 between Old Ford and Victoria via Bank, Holborn, Oxford Circus and Piccadilly, the same routing as today's route 8. On 20 June 1912, routes 8 and 25 exchanged their eastern branches at Bank, with route 25 taking over what has become its traditional route from Seven Kings to Victoria. By the end of the World War I, route 25 was working daily between Seven Kings Garage and Victoria, with a Sunday 25A route from Chadwell Heath to Victoria. During the 1920s, London's bus transport expanded rapidly, and route 25 soon had gained 25B, 25C and 25D suffixed routes.

A scale model of a 25 bus as operated by the London General Omnibus Company from the 1910s is displayed at the Science Museum in London.

On 1 December 1924, many routes in the group were renumbered, with 25A becoming 125, 25B changing to 26, 25C to 126 and the 25D becoming route 145. This situation remained until 3 October 1934, when the newly constituted London Passenger Transport Board instituted its own numbering system, which generally re-instated the situation previous to December 1924, apart for route 145, which by then had developed into a self-contained route, thereby keeping its route number. Each route ran every 6 minutes on Mondays to Fridays, providing 40 buses per hour on the common sections; the routes were operated from garages in Seven Kings, Forest Gate, Upton Park and Hammersmith on route 25.

From 4 September 1982, the route was revised to run in two overlapping sections, Ilford to Victoria and Becontree Heath to Aldgate; the latter section being renumbered 225, albeit running to Limehouse instead of Aldgate. Both routes were AEC Routemaster operated, however Route 225 was created purely as a means of converting the eastern end of what was route 25 to one man operation which took place under the next programme of changes on 23 April 1983 using Leyland Titans from Seven Kings and West Ham garages.

On 16 January 1988, route 25 (now Ilford to Victoria) was converted to one man operation. This rendered the use of route number 225 superfluous and consequently the whole service was renumbered back to 25, albeit still running in overlapping sections.

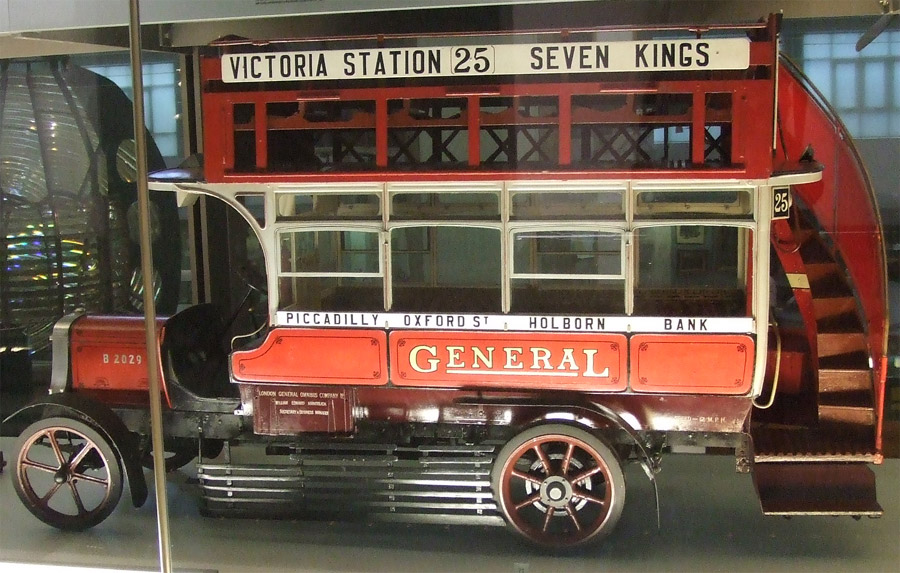
A scale model of a London General Omnibus Company 25 bus from the 1910s at the Science Museum

The route was allocated to the East London division of London Buses in April 1989. On 18 July 1992 the route was curtailed at Oxford Circus, with the section to Victoria becoming part of route 8.

On 20 March 1993, the route was withdrawn from Becontree Heath and curtailed at Ilford Hainault Street and also Saturday and Sunday services were diverted via Cannon Street.

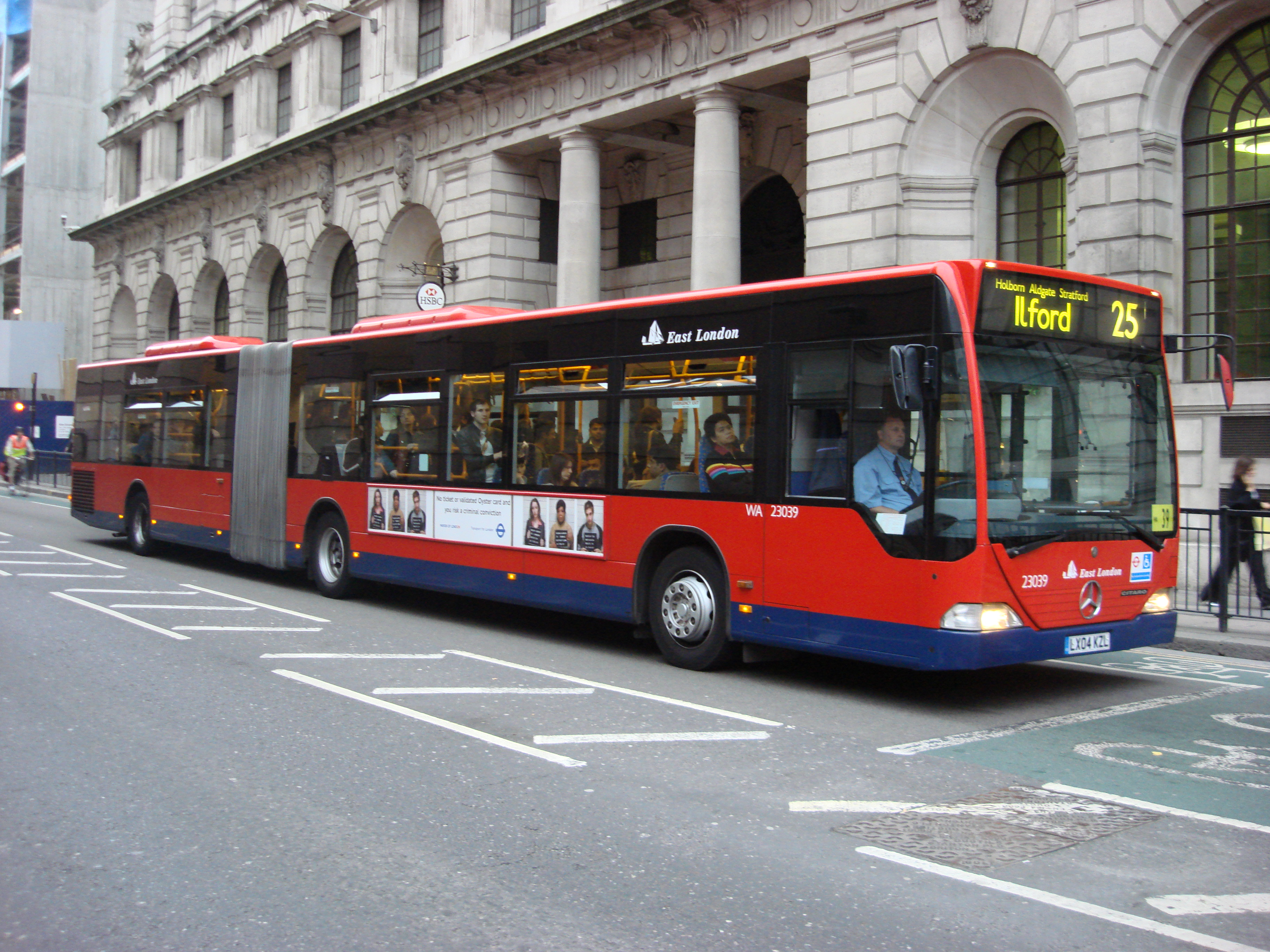
East London Mercedes-Benz O530G on Cheapside in April 2007

When next tendered, the route returned to East London (by now part of Stagecoach London) on 26 June 2004. The weekend diversion to Tower Hill was withdrawn. Route 25 was the longest route in London to use articulated buses in terms of route length.

In January 2004, three hydrogen fuel cell powered buses were introduced on route 25 on a two-year trial. The route was chosen due to its length and "wide variety of traffic conditions". These vehicles ran on the route in addition to the regular articulated vehicles. However, the vehicles were transferred to route RV1 in September 2004.

Upon being re-tendered, on 25 June 2011 the route passed to First London.

On 22 June 2013, route 25 was included in the sale of First London's Lea Interchange garage to Tower Transit. In August 2014, two buses on the route were fitted with equipment designed to enhance bus drivers' awareness of pedestrians and cyclists as part of a six-week trial. The route was chosen because it was "most likely to encounter packed seas of distracted shopping people and cyclists".

In 2015/16 route 25 was the busiest route in London with 19.4 million passengers.

Tower Transit retained the route when next tendered with a new contract commencing on 25 June 2016. However rather than the usual duration of five years, the new contract only runs until November 2019 to allow demand to be reassessed after the opening of Elizabeth line.

From 1 December 2018, route 25 was cut back from Oxford Circus to City Thameslink station. It ceased to be a 24-hour route from the same date with the introduction of route N25.

On 23 May 2020, route 25 went back to Stagecoach London.

== Incidents ==
In October 2007, a man was killed when he became trapped under an articulated bus on the route having got off it in Ilford High Road.

In a three-day period in February 2010, while still a 24-hour service, 31 homeless people were discovered to be riding route 25 overnight to spend "two hours in the warm" when a taskforce noticed a large number of call-outs by drivers to have police and ambulance remove homeless from the bus, resulting in the buses having to wait before returning to service; social services groups responded by going to the bus garage and getting the homeless into overnight shelters.

== Current route ==
Route 25 operates via these primary locations:

- Ilford Hainault Street
- Manor Park First Avenue
- Woodgrange Park station
- Forest Gate Woodgrange Road
- Stratford bus station for Stratford station
- Stratford High Street station
- Bow Church station
- Bow Road station
- Mile End station
- Stepney Green station
- Whitechapel station
- Aldgate East station
- Aldgate station
- Bank station
- St Paul's station
- Holborn Circus
