= Rashon =

Rashon is a given name. Notable people with the name include:

- Rashon Burno (born 1978), American basketball coach
- Ra'Shon Harris (born 1986), American basketball player

== See also ==
- Rashan (given name)
