= East London Coroner's Court =

Court in London

Coordinates: 51.5780°N 0.0257°W

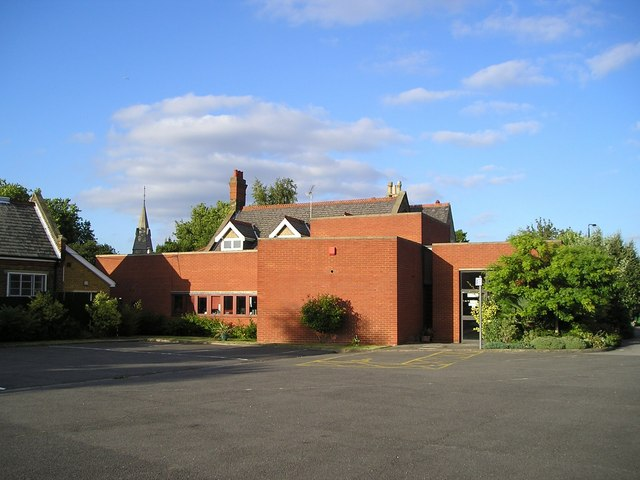
East London Coroner's Court in 2009

The Coroner's Court for east London is located at Queens Road, Walthamstow. The court covers the boroughs of Waltham Forest, Newham, Redbridge, Havering and Barking and Dagenham.
