= Rasan =

Rasan or Resan (Persian: رسن) may refer to:

- Rasan (organization), a Kurdish freedom fighters and women's rights organization
- Rasan, Khuzestan, a village in Iran
- Rasan, Razavi Khorasan, a village in Iran
- Kalateh-ye Allah Resan, a village in Iran
- Resan Hanım (1860–1910), wife of Sultan Murad V of the Ottoman Empire

== See also ==
- Råsån, a lake in Nord-Odal Municipality, Norway
