= Stratford bus station =

Bus station opened in 1994 in London

Coordinates: 51°32′28″N 0°0′7″W

Stratford Bus Station
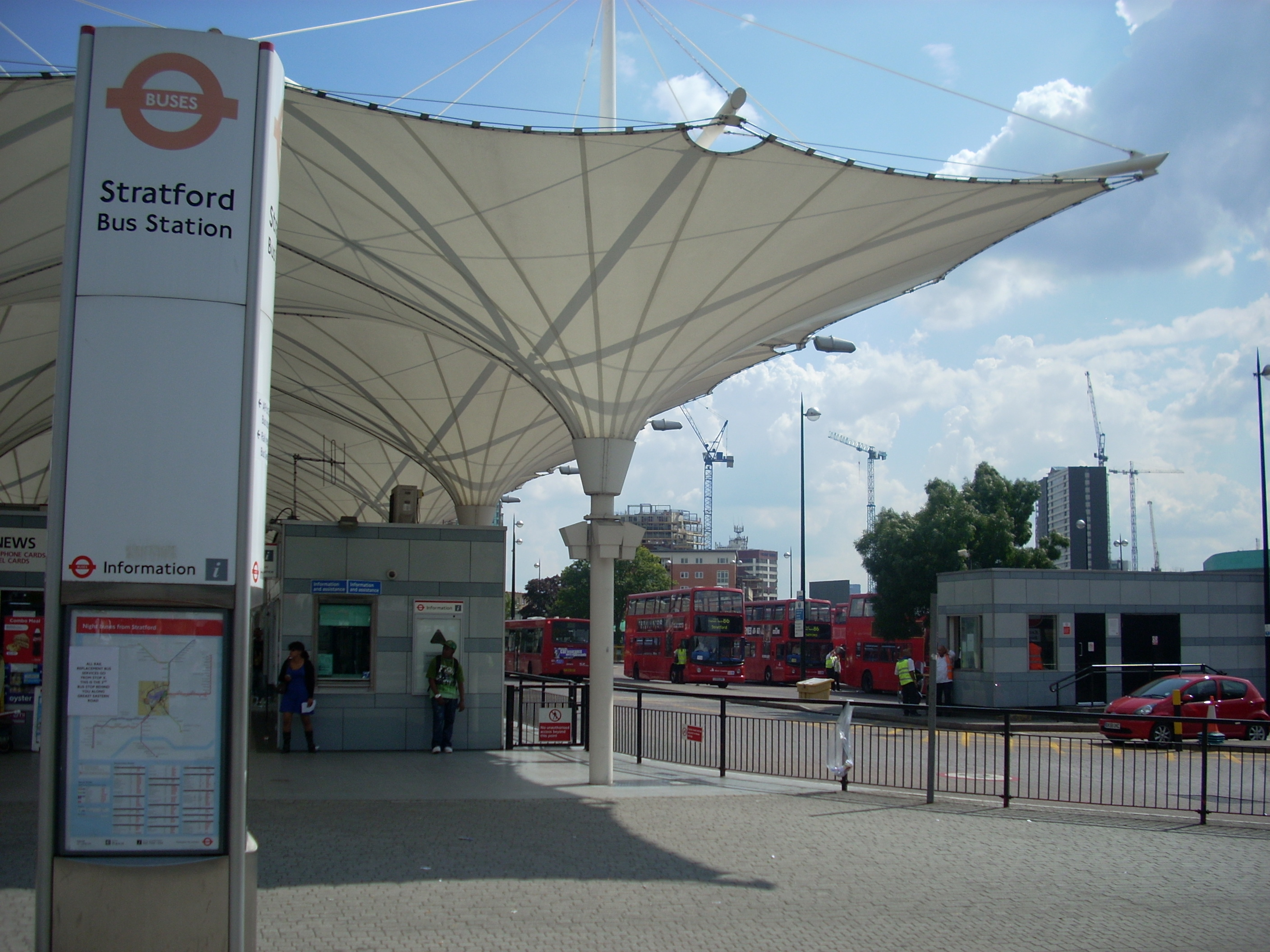
- The bus station in 2009

General information
- Location: Stratford; Newham
- Owner: Transport for London
- Operator: London Buses
- Bus stands: 5
- Bus operators: Arriva London; Docklands Buses; London Central; National Express; Stagecoach London
- Connections: Adjacent to Stratford station

History
- Opened: November 1994
Location

Stratford bus station is a bus station and taxi rank in Stratford in London, England. The station is owned and maintained by Transport for London. An entrance to Stratford station is located adjacent to the bus station, while Westfield Stratford City and Stratford City bus station are located across the link bridge on the other side of the railway.

Designed in-house by London Transport architect Soji Abass, the bus station opened on 16 November 1994, and comprises five bus stands. It replaced an older bus station on the site, which was situated on the ground floor of a multi-storey car park prior to demolition. As of 2011, over 20 million passengers use the bus station every year.

London Buses routes 25, 69, 86, 104, 158, 238, 241, 257, 262, 276, 308, 425, 473, D8 and night routes N8, N25 and N86 serve the station.

== See also ==
- List of bus and coach stations in London
