= Kalateh-ye Allah Resan =

Kalateh-ye Allah Resan كلاته اله رسان
- village
- Location within Iran
- Coordinates: 35°22′31″N 60°41′28″E
- Country: Iran
- Province: Razavi Khorasan
- County: Torbat-e Jam
- Bakhsh: Central
- Rural District: Jamrud

Population (2006)
  - Total: 82
- Time zone: UTC+3: 30 (IRST)
  - Summer (DST): UTC+4: 30 (IRDT)

Kalateh-ye Allah Resan (Persian: كلاته اله رسان, also Romanized as Kalāteh-ye Allāh Resān; also known as Kalāteh-ye Sarfarāz Khān) is a village in Jamrud Rural District, in the Central District of Torbat-e Jam County, Razavi Khorasan Province, Iran. At the 2006 census, its population was 82, in 19 families.
