= Rashawn Scott =

Rashawn Scott may refer to:

- Rashawn Scott (American football) (born 1992), American football wide receiver
- Rashawn Scott (footballer) (born 2002), English association football midfielder
