= Stratford City bus station =

Bus station opened in 2011 in London

Stratford City Bus Station
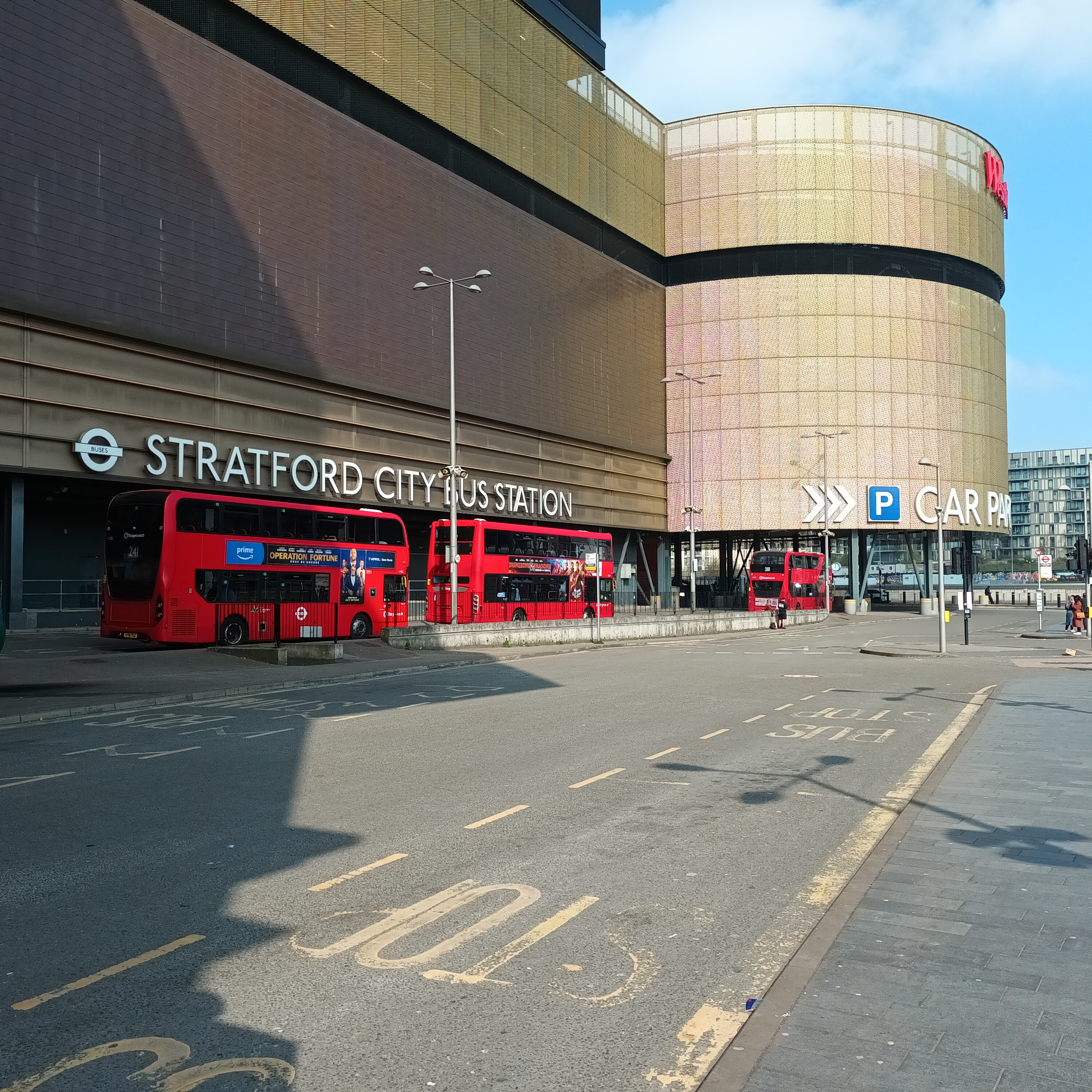
- Buses at the bus station in April 2023

General information
- Location: Stratford; Newham; England
- Coordinates: 51°32′37.57″N 0°0′15.45″W
- Operator: Transport for London
- Bus stands: 5
- Bus operators: London Central; Stagecoach London
- Connections: Adjacent to Stratford station and Stratford International station

History
- Opened: 13 September 2011; 14 years ago
Location

Stratford City Bus Station is located on Montfichet Road, adjacent to the main entrance of Westfield Stratford City. It opened on 13 September 2011 as part of the new shopping centre. An entrance to Stratford station is located adjacent to the entrance to Westfield and the bus station. The main entrance to Stratford station and Stratford bus station located across the link bridge on the other side of the railway.

London Buses routes 97, 108, 241, 308, 339, 388 and night route N205 serve the station.

== See also ==
- List of bus and coach stations in London
