= Walthamstow =

Town in East London, England

Coordinates: 51°35′02″N 0°01′16″W

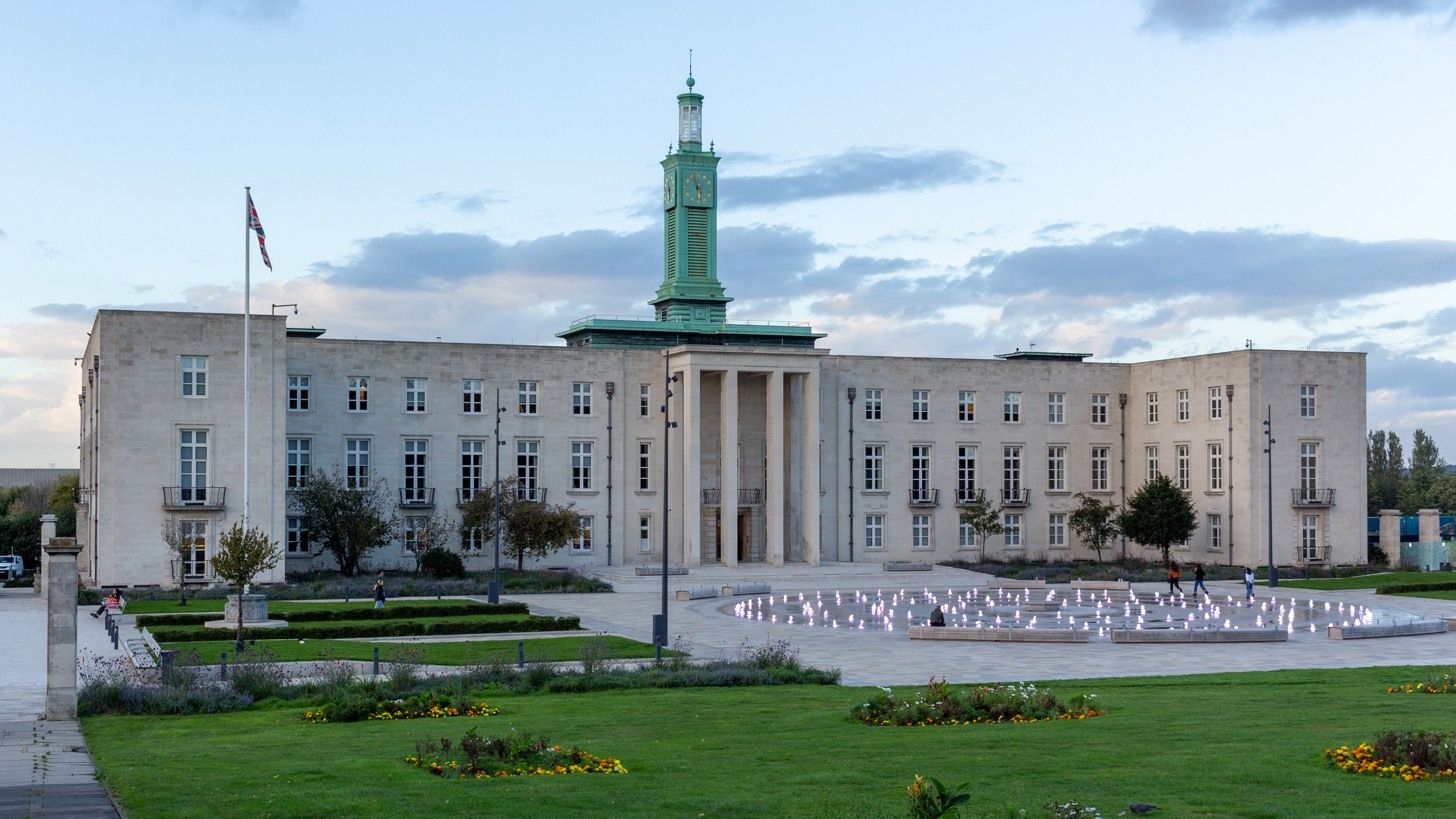
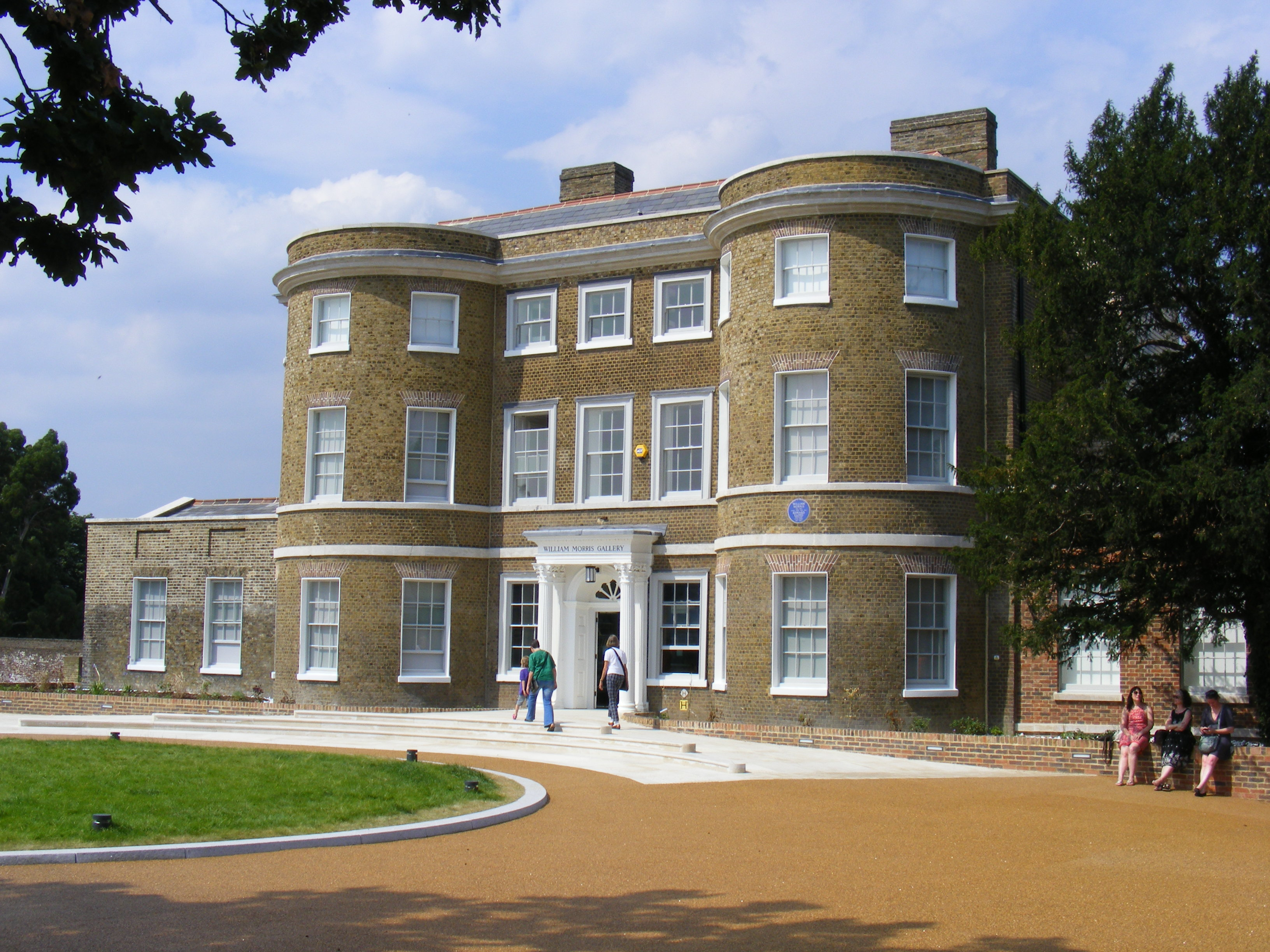
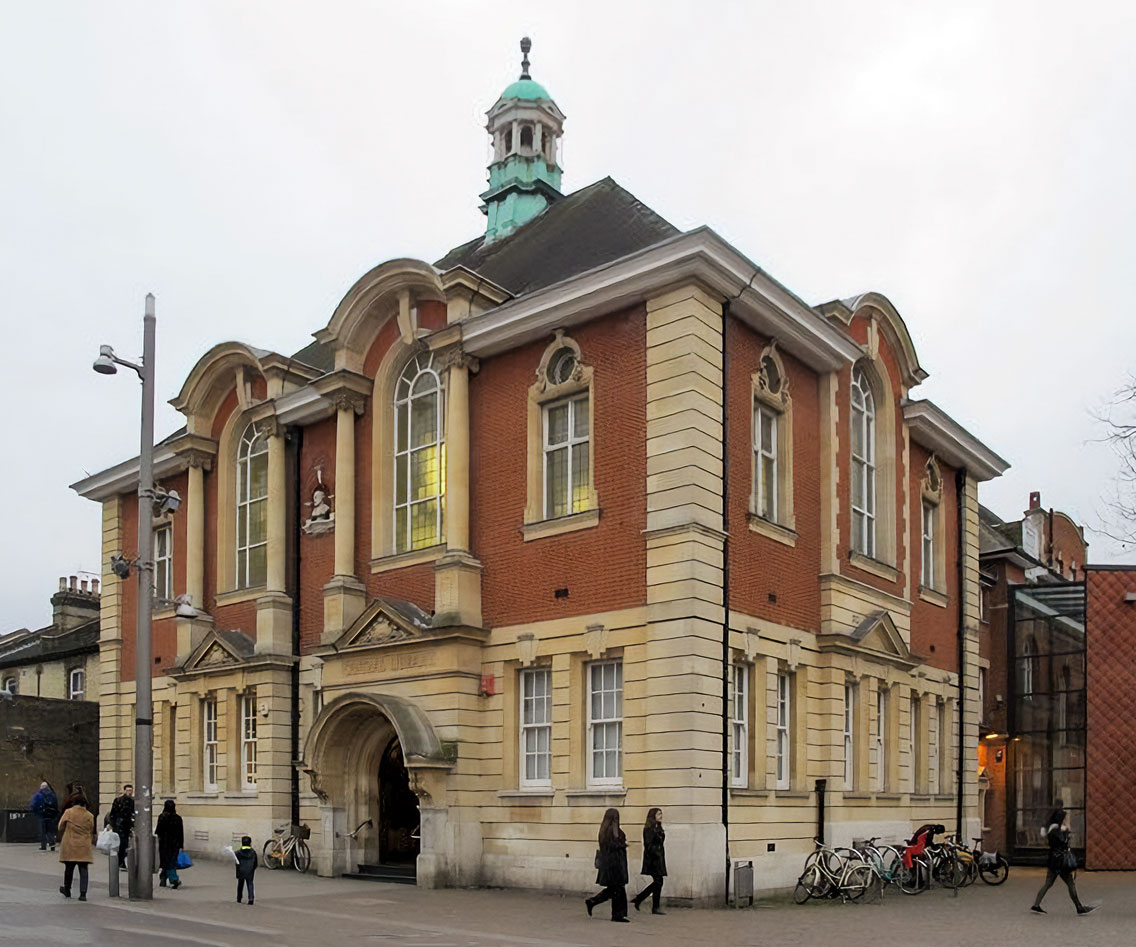
- Clockwise from top: Waltham Forest Town Hall, Walthamstow Library, and the William Morris Gallery

- Location within Greater London
- Population: 109,424 (2011 Census)
- OS grid reference: TQ372891
  - Charing Cross: 7.5 mi (12.1 km) SW
- London borough: Waltham Forest
- Ceremonial county: Greater London
- Region: London
- Country: England
- Sovereign state: United Kingdom
- Post town: LONDON
- Postcode district: E17
- Dialling code: 020
- Police: Metropolitan
- Fire: London
- Ambulance: London
- UK Parliament: Walthamstow
- London Assembly: North East

Walthamstow (/ˈwɔːlθəmstoʊ/ WAWL-thəm-stoh or /ˈwɒlθəmstoʊ/ WOL-thəm-stoh) is a town within the London Borough of Waltham Forest in East London. The town borders Chingford to the north, Snaresbrook and South Woodford to the east, Leyton and Leytonstone to the south, and Tottenham to the west. At the 2011 census, Walthamstow had a population of approximately 109,424 and is around 7.5 miles (12 km) north-east of Central London. (Note: Measured as tradition from Charing Cross)

Occupying most of the town's east-to-west High Street, Walthamstow Market is the second longest outdoor market in Europe. East of the town centre is Walthamstow Village, the oldest part of Walthamstow, and the location of St Mary's Church, the town's parish church. To the north of the town is the former Walthamstow Stadium, which closed in 2008. The William Morris Gallery in Forest Road, a museum that was once the family home of William Morris, is a Grade II* listed building. The town is served by five railway stations, including Walthamstow Central and Blackhorse Road—interchange stations on the Victoria line of the London Underground.

Walthamstow was a civil parish, originally part of the Becontree Hundred of Essex. As part of the suburban growth of London, the town expanded rapidly in the 19th century, becoming part of the urban area of the city. It has formed part of the Metropolitan Police District since 1840, and the London postal district since its inception in 1856. The parish became a local board district in 1873, an urban district in 1894 and a municipal borough in 1929. Following reform of local government in London in 1965, it merged with the municipal boroughs of Chingford and Leyton to form the new Waltham Forest local authority district, becoming part of Greater London. The borough council is based at Waltham Forest Town Hall on Forest Road.

== History ==
=== Toponymy ===
Walthamstow is recorded c. 1075 as Wilcumestowe ("the Place of Welcome") and in the Domesday Book of 1086 as Wilcumestou.

=== Early history ===
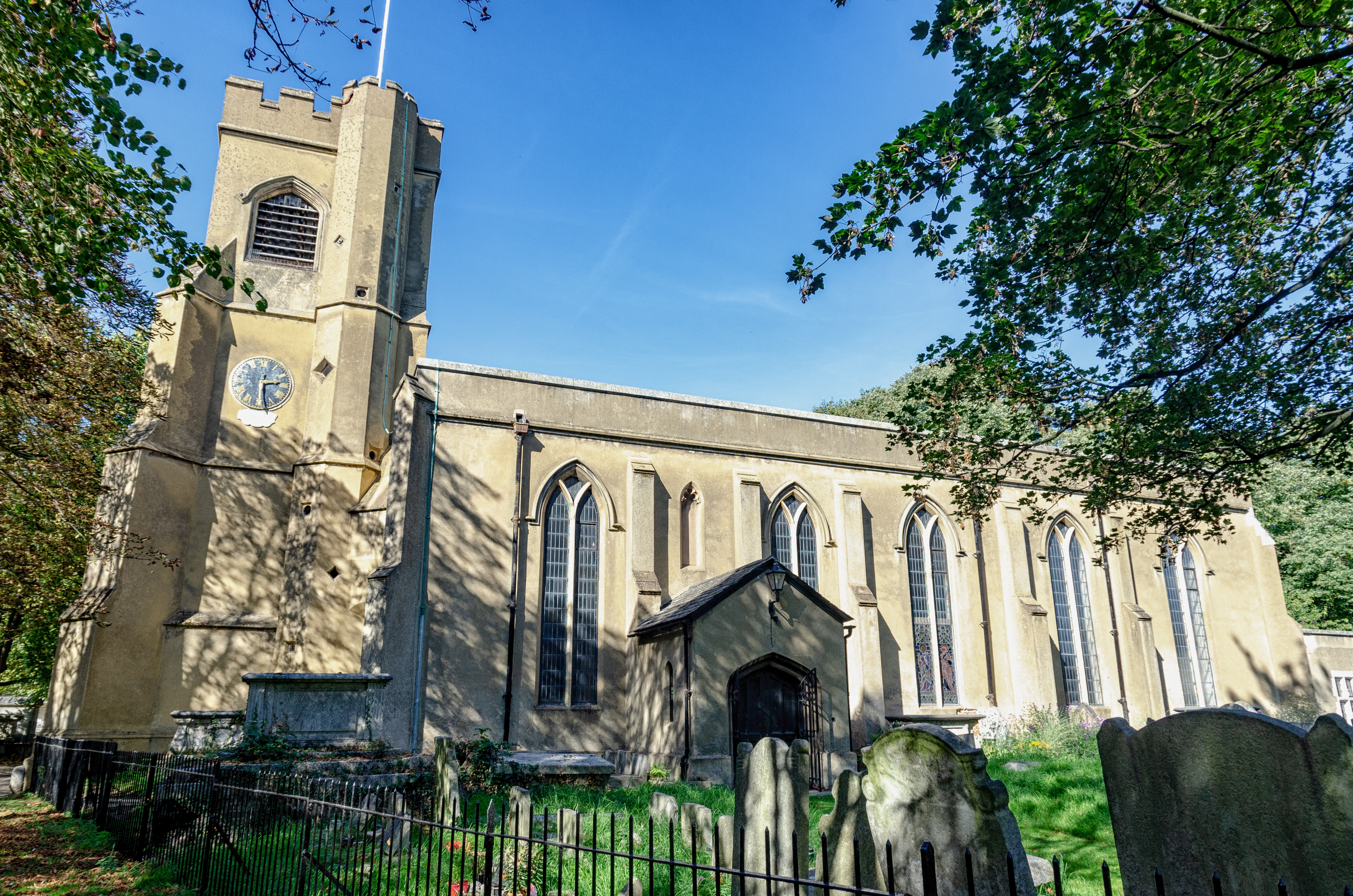
St Mary's Church, the oldest building in Walthamstow, dating as far back as the 13th century

The Domesday Book describes Wilcumestou as a manor owned by the Anglo-Saxon nobleman Earl Waltheof of Huntingdon and Northumbria before the Norman conquest of 1066. After the execution of Earl Waltheof, the property of the land passed to his wife, Countess Judith, also known as Judith of Lens, a niece of William the Conqueror. The Domesday Book records 36 villeins, 25 bordars and 4 slaves living in the manor in 1086. Alice, daughter of Earl Waltheof and Countess Judith, inherited Walthamstow. She married the Norman nobleman Ralph de Tosny or Toeni (also known as Raoul IV de Conches) in 1103. When her husband died, c. 1126, Alice gave the church of Walthamstow to the Priors of the Holy Trinity based in Aldgate, London.

King John stayed in Walthamstow for two nights in February 1208.

In the 1660s Sir William Batten, Surveyor of the Navy, and his wife Elizabeth Woodcocke had a house in Wood Street where, according to Samuel Pepys, Batten lived "like a prince" and cultivated a vineyard. The Vestry House, now the Vestry House Museum, was used as the first town hall.

The influential textile designer and craftsman William Morris was born in Walthamstow in 1834. The Georgian mansion where he lived as a teenager houses the William Morris Gallery. By 1870 Walthamstow had grown to the size of a small suburb and a new town hall was built in Orford Road from which affairs of the village were run. A new town hall designed by architect Philip Dalton Hepworth in the Nordic Classical style was built between 1938 and 1942.

=== Urban development ===
Walthamstow (parish abolished 1965) population View source data.

Until the late 19th century Walthamstow was largely rural, with a small village centre (now Walthamstow Village) and a number of large estates. The main route through the district was Hoe Street. There were various smaller lanes crossing the town. The road now known as Forest Road was originally called Clay Street. Further south, the High Street was named Marsh Street, and led from the original settlement out to the marshes. Shernhall Street is an ancient route, as is Wood Street, to the east.

With the advent of the railways and the ensuing suburbanisation in the late 19th century, Walthamstow experienced a large growth in population and speculative building.

The Lighthouse Methodist Church which dates from 1893 is situated on Markhouse Road, on the corner of Downsfield Road. There is a lantern at the top of the tower, which also contains a spiral staircase. The church was erected because of the generosity of Captain David King of the shipbuilding firm of Bullard King & Co which also ran the Natal Direct Shipping Line, which ran ships direct from London to Durban without stopping at the Cape.

=== Transport breakthroughs ===
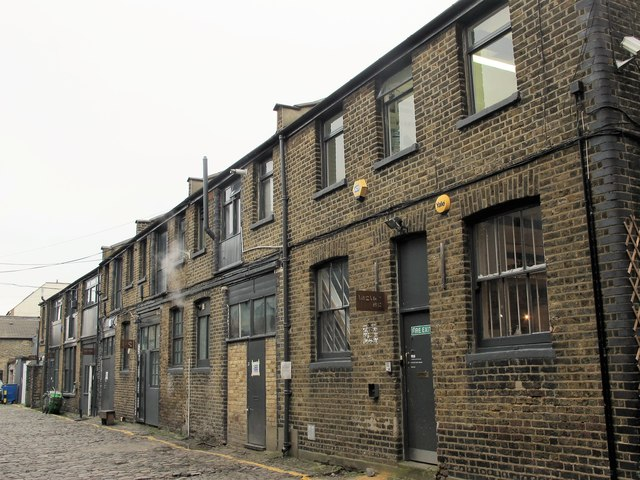
Former tramworks on Hatherley Mews dating to the 1880s; these converted stables were used for London's electric trams until 1952

In 1885, John Kemp Starley, originally from Church Hill in Walthamstow, designed the first modern bicycle, and in 1892, Frederick Bremer built the first British motorcar in a workshop in his garden, at Connaught Road. The vehicle is on display at the Vestry House Museum in Walthamstow.

The LGOC X-type and B-type buses were built at Blackhorse Lane from October 1908 onwards. The B-type is considered one of the first mass-production buses. The manufacturing operation later became AEC, famous as the manufacturer of many of London's buses. On 13 June 1909, A. V. Roe's aircraft took to the air from Walthamstow Marshes. It was the first all-British aircraft and was given the ominous nickname of the "Yellow Terror" but officially carried the name Avro1. Roe later founded the Avro aircraft company, which later built the acclaimed Avro Lancaster.

=== Walthamstow Power Station ===
Walthamstow Corporation had been authorised in 1904 to supply electricity to the borough. The power station in Exeter Street had three brick chimneys and an array of wooden cooling towers. In 1923 the revenue from sales of electricity was £109,909. Upon nationalisation of the electricity industry in 1948 ownership of the station passed to the British Electricity Authority and later to the Central Electricity Generating Board. The CEGB closed the station in 1967 when the thermal efficiency was 9.30 per cent. It was subsequently demolished.

=== Local government ===
Walthamstow was an ancient parish in the Becontree Hundred of Essex. In 1873 most of the parish was made a local government district, administered by an elected local board. An exclave of the parish known as the "Walthamstow Slip" was included instead in the Leyton district; that exclave was transferred to Leyton parish in 1878.

Such local government districts were reconstituted as urban districts under the Local Government Act 1894. The Walthamstow Urban District was converted into a municipal borough in 1929, becoming the Municipal Borough of Walthamstow. In 1931 the population of the borough, covering an area of 4,342 acres (1,757 hectares), peaked at 132,972. In 1965 the borough was abolished and its former area merged with that of the Municipal Borough of Chingford and the Municipal Borough of Leyton to form the London Borough of Waltham Forest in Greater London. Other places in east London formerly of the county of Essex, such as Ilford and Romford were placed into London boroughs along with Walthamstow. None of the postal district names or codes was changed at this time (e.g. Ilford remained Ilford, Essex IG1-IG6 and Walthamstow remained London E17).

=== Post-war history ===
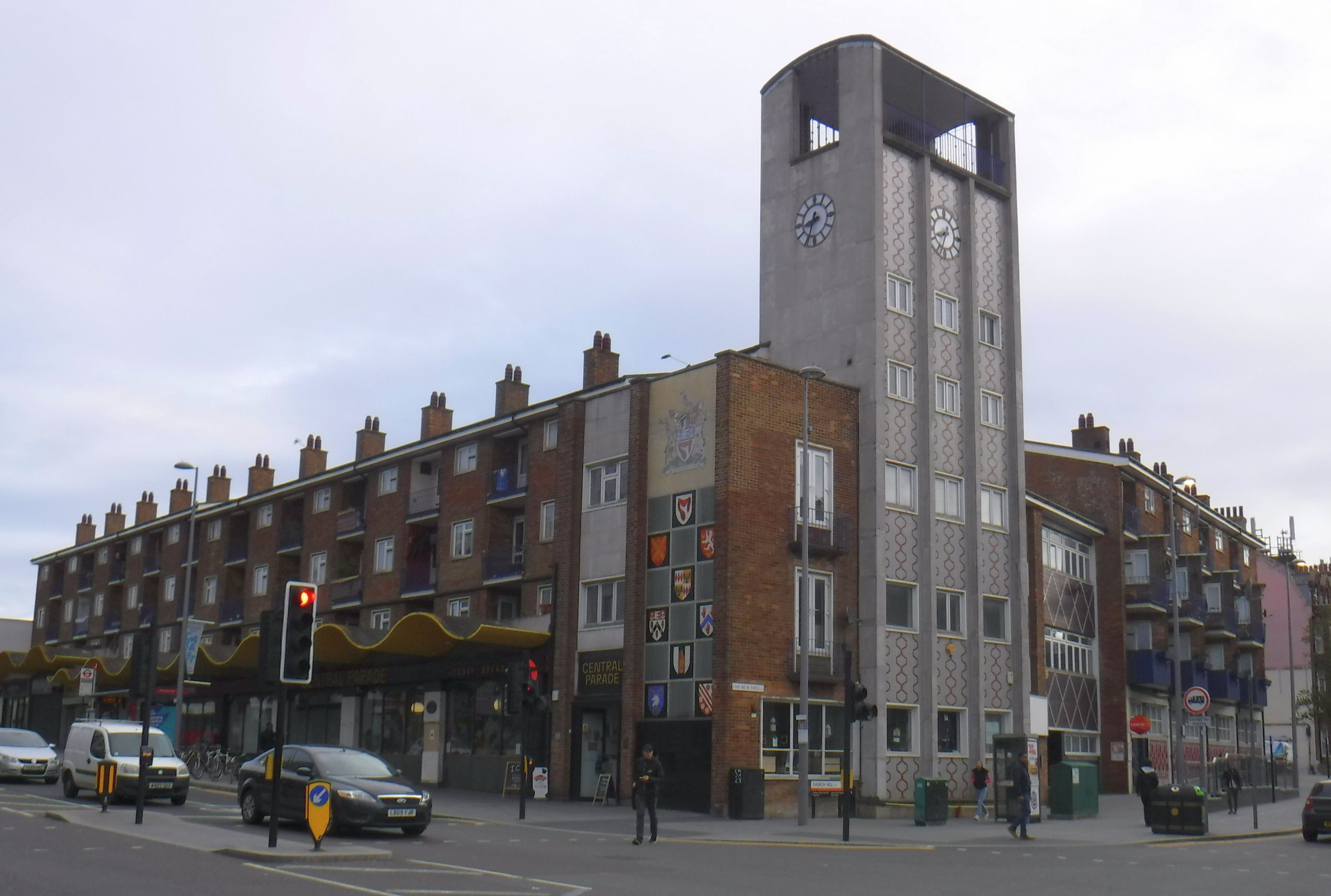
Central Parade on the corner of Hoe Street and Church Hill – this was designed by F. G. Southgate and built in 1957 on the site of a 1944 war-era bomb attack that killed 22 people

Since the 2012 Summer Olympics, the town has become increasingly popular mostly as a result of gentrification. Local property prices increased at a high rate of 22.3% from 2013 to 2014, compared to London's average of 17.8%. It has turned Walthamstow into a 'trendy' town similar to Shoreditch. The leafy Walthamstow Village in particular has become sought after by buyers.

On 29 May 2015, a regular local unicyclist was hit and dragged under by a double decker route 212 bus in Hoe Street. Locals numbering up to 100 people helped to pull the bus off the unicyclist. The MP for Walthamstow, Stella Creasy, later said she was "proud" of the community for saving the unicyclist's life.

== Governance ==
Walthamstow elects councillors to Waltham Forest London Borough Council. It is within the Walthamstow parliamentary constituency.

== Geography and locale ==
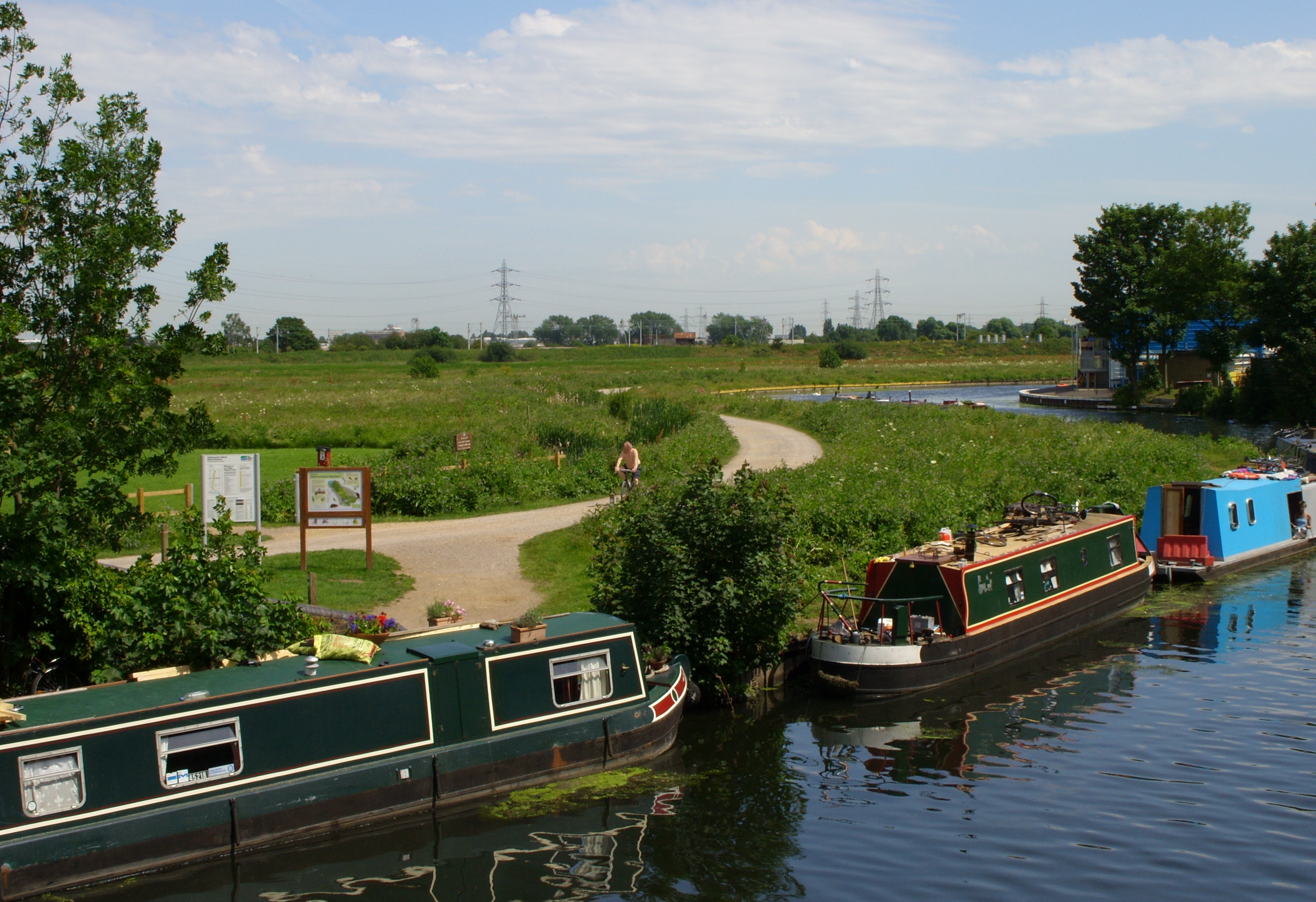
Walthamstow Marshes

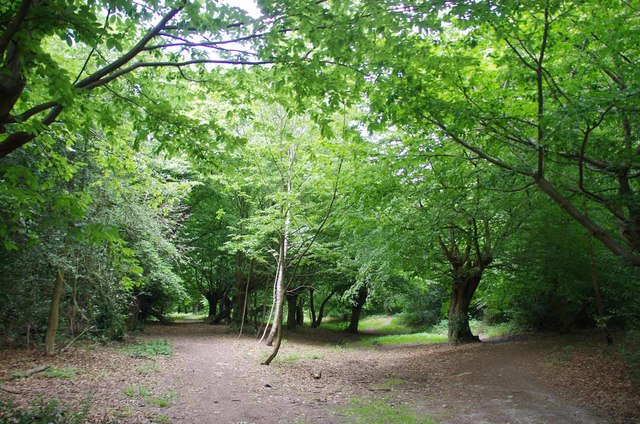
Trees in Walthamstow Forest, part of the greater Epping Forest

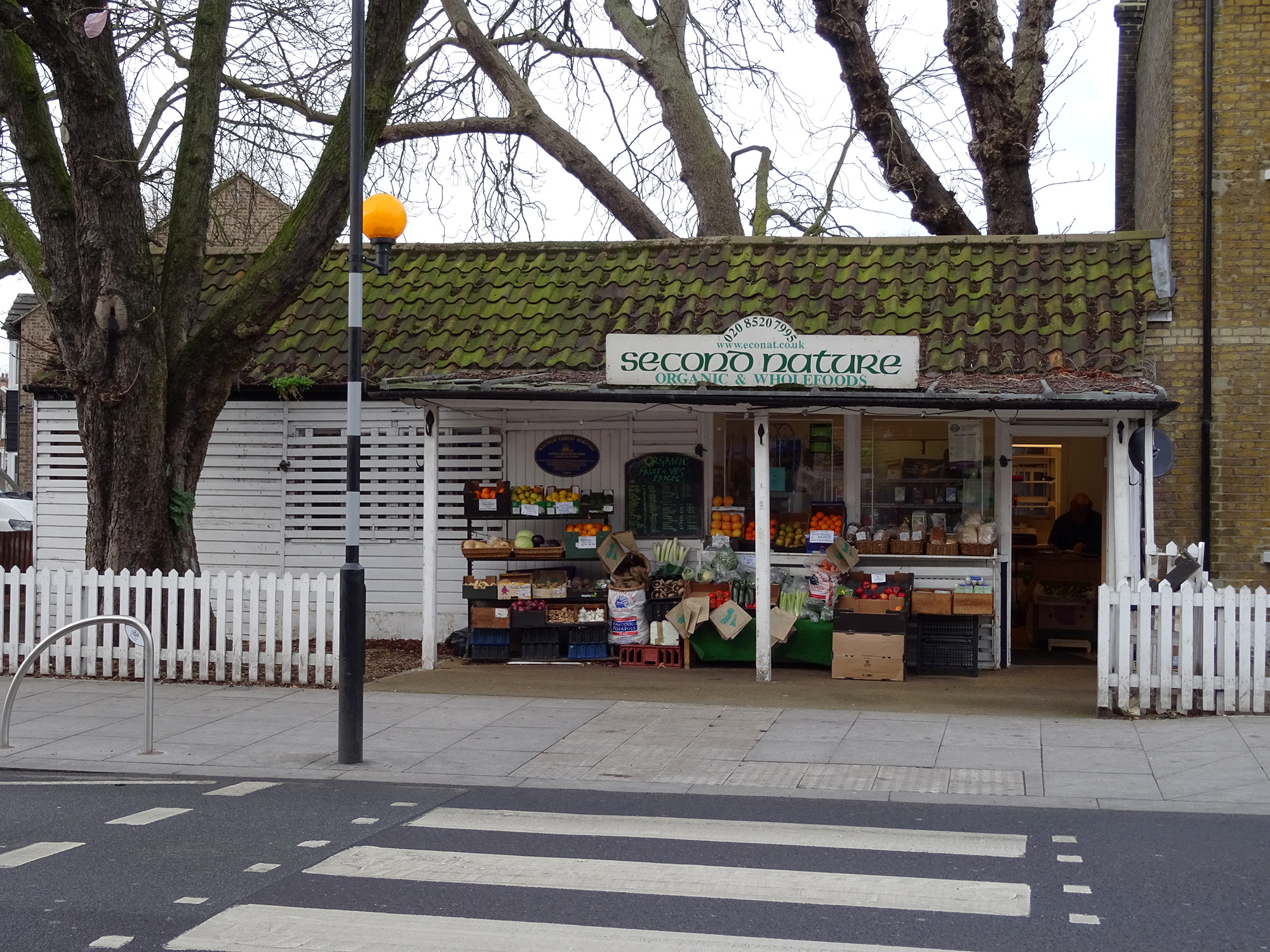
The Grade II listed building of the former Jones's Butchers Shop in Wood Street. The trunk of the Wood Street Horse Chestnut, a Great Tree of London is to the left of the shop doorway

Walthamstow is bordered to the north by Chingford and to the south by Leyton and Leytonstone. Woodford lies to the east with a boundary running through Epping Forest, Hackney lies to the south-west beyond the Walthamstow Marshes and the Lea, while Tottenham is situated westward on the far side of the River Lea and the Lee Valley Reservoir Chain. The A112 (Leyton High Road, Hoe Street, Chingford Road, Chingford Mount Rd) passes south–north through Walthamstow and its neighbouring towns forming part of an ancient route from London to Waltham Abbey. Walthamstow is situated south of the North Circular Road. Walthamstow Central is the main transport hub.

Walthamstow Village conservation area is a district to the east of what has become the commercial centre of Walthamstow. The area is roughly defined as being south of Church Hill, west of Shernhall Street, north of Grove Road, and east of Hoe Street. Orford Road is the main route through the district, though even this is a quiet thoroughfare by the standards of London. The village has a small selection of specialist shops, pubs and restaurants, and house prices tend to be higher in the streets of this neighbourhood. It was voted best urban village in London by Time Out magazine in 2004.

Upper Walthamstow is to the east of Walthamstow Village. The area's main thoroughfare is Wood Street, which has several shops and local businesses, and is served by the London Overground at Wood Street station on the Liverpool Street to Chingford line.

One of the Great Trees of London, the Wood Street Horse Chestnut, is located next to the former Jones's Butchers Shop, a grade II listed, late 18th century weatherboarded building. The tree is thought to be upwards of 175 years old.

Wood Street is home to Wood Street Indoor Market. The market was the site of a cinema from 1912 to 1955, operated by the Penny Picture Theatre Co. It re-opened under new independent management in 1953 as the Rio Cinema, but this was short lived and it closed in 1955. Now the market is filled with quirky market traders, and was documented in a short documentary made by Mark Windows.

Walthamstow has a wide variety of housing stock, but the vast majority of residential property was built in the early 20th century. From Coppermill Lane in the west (next to the marshes), to Wood Street in the east, there are thousands of terraced streets dating to the Edwardian era and the 1920s. The area along Markhouse Road and St James Street has many examples of Warner properties. These were developed as affordable housing for the working classes in the early part of the 20th century. Bombing raids in the Second World War and urban redevelopment projects in the 1960s and 1970s have left areas with more modern housing, mostly in the shape of low-rise concrete blocks.

The northern continuation of Markhouse Road is St James's Street to which Blackhorse Road follows, served by underground and railway stations, which in turn becomes Blackhorse Lane. This is bound on its western side by industrial units and warehouses. The London Borough of Waltham Forest has proposed developing the area around Blackhorse Road railway station to become a gateway to the town.

Although bounded by the marshes to the west and parts of Epping Forest to the east, there is little open space in the actual town. There used to be two commons in the town, Church Common, adjacent to St. Mary's Church in Walthamstow Village and Markhouse Common, located off Markhouse Lane (now Markhouse Road) and what is now the western end of Queens Road. Both open spaces were lost in the 19th century, when the land was sold to property developers. Lloyd Park has been open to the public since 1900 and is located on Forest Road behind the William Morris Gallery. It has a formal garden with a pond, and the adjacent Aveling Field has facilities for bowling, tennis, basketball, an outdoor gym, a skate park and a children's play area.

== Demography ==
Walthamstow roughly approximates to seven of the electoral wards within the London Borough of Waltham Forest: Chapel End (northeastern part), Higham Hill (northwestern part), High Street (western), Hoe Street (inner-eastern and Walthamstow Village), Markhouse (southwestern), William Morris (northern), and Wood Street (eastern and Upper Walthamstow). The 2011 census counted a total population of 109,424 of all these wards combined.

As of the 2011 census, White British is the largest ethnicity in all wards. Other White is the second largest in all wards except Markhouse. The other double-digit ethnicities are Asians and African. The minority ethnic proportion ranges from 48.5% in Chapel End to 58.2% in Markhouse.

The male life expectancy ranged from 77.2 years in Hoe Street to 82.1 years in Chapel End; the female life expectancy ranged from 82.1 years in both Higham Hill and Hoe Street to 84.8 years in High Street. This data covers 2009–2013.

The median house price as of 2014 was highest in Wood Street ward (£387,500) and lowest in Markhouse ward (£324,000).

2011 Census homes %
Ward	Detached	Semi-detached	Terraced	Flats and apartments
Chapel End	4.9%	11.9%	55.0%	28.3%
High Street	3.0%	6.9%	32.1%	58.0%
Higham Hill	5.4%	15.9%	44.3%	34.3%
Hoe Street	3.2%	9.7%	25.1%	61.9%
Markhouse	6.4%	10.7%	46.3%	36.6%
William Morris	5.0%	9.3%	43.0%	42.6%
Wood Street	3.0%	12.9%	30.0%	54.1%

== Economy ==
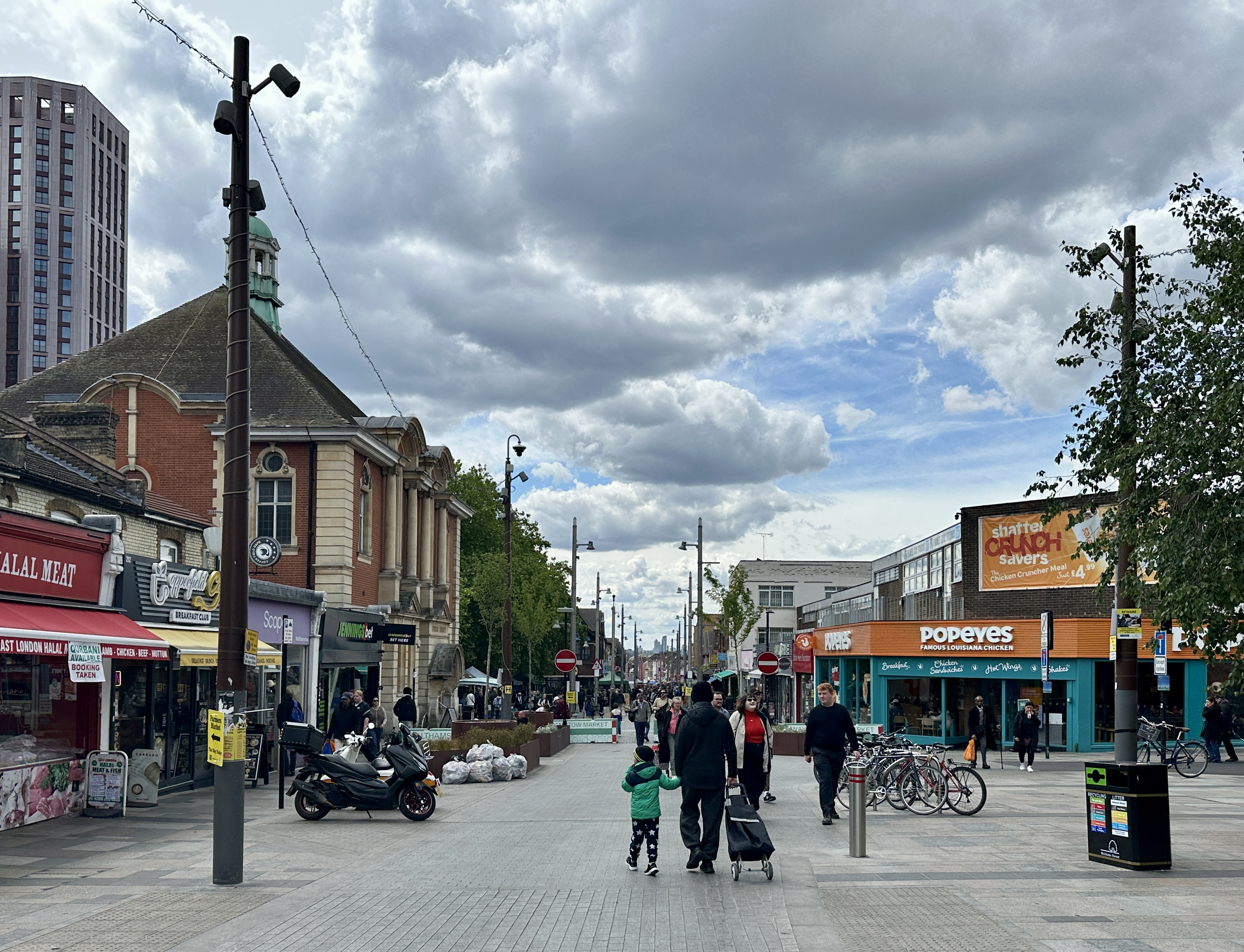
High Street, where the long Walthamstow Market runs five days a week

The High Street is dominated by Walthamstow Market, which began in 1885, and occupies all but the last 100 yards of the street. It is reputed to be a mile long, but in fact measures approximately 2/3 mi (1.1 km). It is the second longest street market in Europe. The market is open five days a week (not Sunday or Monday), and there is a Sunday farmers' market. The street is lined with shops: a selection of high street chains, but also many independent small shops specialising in food, fabrics, and household goods, as well as cafés. There are two patches of more recent development: Sainsbury's supermarket and the covered shopping centre 17&Central (originally Selborne Walk, then The Mall Walthamstow, badly damaged by a fire in 2019 and fully restored) both of which have large multi-storey car parks.

The historic central library on the High Street was one of many built with money donated by the Scottish-American businessman and philanthropist Andrew Carnegie, whose portrait bust can be seen on the exterior of the building. The library was damaged by a fire in 1982 but modernised and expanded in 2006–07. At the same time, a large plot at the corner of High Street and Hoe Street was set for substantial redevelopment as a retail space. This site was previously the location of the town's central post office and a shopping arcade built in the 1960s. Plans for the redevelopment of this site initially fell through in 2005, but work on a new cinema, flats and restaurants started in April 2013 and was completed in December 2014. As of 2024, there is current refurbishment of the town square and new homes adjacent to the 17&Central shopping centre which is being extended.

The Walthamstow Beer Mile, also known as the Blackhorse Beer Mile, is an attraction consisting of a growing number of micro-breweries, and their associated tap-rooms, in and around Blackhorse Road and Blackhorse Lane.

== Transport ==
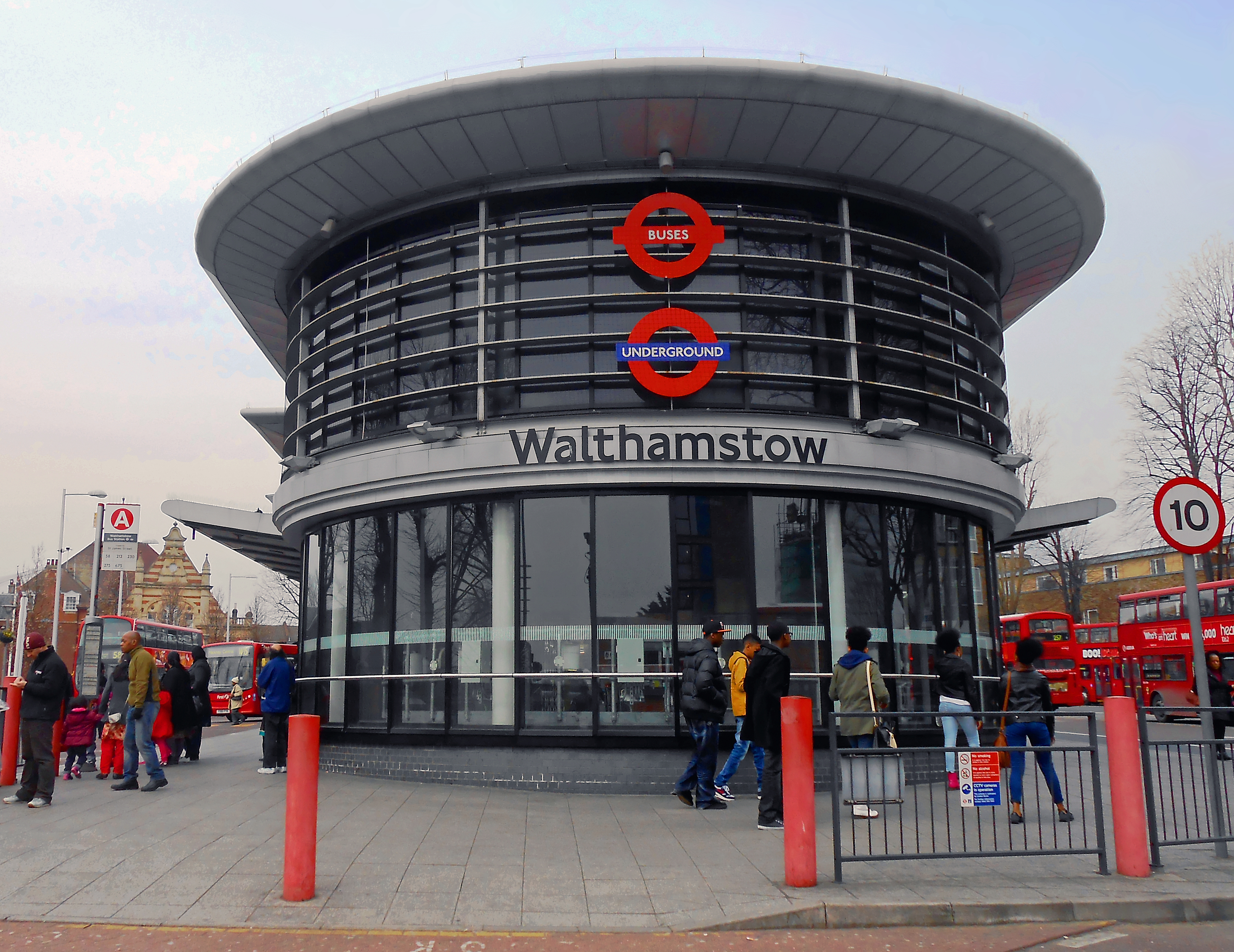
Walthamstow Central bus and railway stations

=== Railway ===
Walthamstow is served by trains on the London Underground and London Overground networks.

Walthamstow Central is the area's busiest interchange. It is the northern terminus of the London Underground Victoria line, which provides the area with a direct connection to Tottenham, the West End and Brixton. The station is also served by London Overground Weaver line services between London Liverpool Street and Chingford, via Hackney Downs.

There is an out-of-station interchange with Walthamstow Queen's Road, which is on the London Overground between Gospel Oak and Barking.

Blackhorse Road is located to the west of Walthamstow; it is also served by Victoria line trains and London Overground Suffragette line trains between Gospel Oak and Barking Riverside.

Other stations include St James Street and Wood Street, on the London Overground Weaver line between Liverpool Street and Chingford.

Lea Bridge is also nearby, served by Greater Anglia trains between Stratford and Bishop's Stortford, via Tottenham Hale and Harlow, with onward connections to Stansted Airport.

All railway stations in the area are in London fare zone 3, except for Wood Street which is in zone 4.

=== Buses ===
The following London Buses routes serve the area:

- 20
- 34
- 55
- 58
- 69
- 97
- 123
- 158
- 212
- 215
- 230
- 257
- 275
- 357
- 675
- SL1
- SL2
- W11
- W12
- W15
- W16
- W19
- N26 (night route)
- N38 (night route)
- N73 (night route)

Walthamstow bus station is next to Walthamstow Central station, along Selborne Road.

=== Road ===
Several arterial routes pass through Walthamstow which link the district to other areas in London and the East of England.

To the north, the A406 (North Circular) runs east–west around Walthamstow. The road links the district to Ilford, the M11 (for Stansted Airport) and London City Airport to the east. To the west, the North Circular passes through Edmonton, Finchley and Brent Cross en route to Chiswick. The route meets the M1 and M4 motorways (for Luton and Heathrow airports).

To the southeast of nearby Leytonstone, the A12 (Eastern Avenue) carries traffic northeast towards the M25, Romford, and destinations in Essex and Suffolk. Southwest, the A12 passes around Stratford and Hackney Wick before terminating in Poplar.

Other routes include:

- A104 (Lea Bridge Road) – southwest to Lea Bridge and Clapton, northeast to the A406 (North Circular), Buckhurst Hill and Epping Forest.
- A112 (Hoe Street/Chingford Road) – southbound to Leyton, Stratford and London City Airport, northbound to the A406 (North Circular), Chingford and Waltham Abbey.
- A1006 – north–south through Walthamstow carried by Church Road, Markhouse Road, St James's Street and Blackhorse Road.
- A503 (Forest Road) – runs east–west through Walthamstow from the A406 (North Circular) in the east to Tottenham, Holloway and Camden Town to the west.

==== Air pollution ====
The London Borough of Waltham Forest monitors kerbside and roadside Nitrogen Dioxide (NO_{2}) levels in Walthamstow.

To the north of Walthamstow, at the Crooked Billet Roundabout (North Circular), there is an automatic monitoring site which recorded an average NO_{2} concentration of 61.1μg/m3 (micrograms per cubic metre) in 2017. This fails to meet the UK National Air Quality Objective set by the Department for Environment, Food & Rural Affairs (DEFRA) at 40μg/m3.

Alternative roadside monitoring sites along Hoe Street and Selborne Road also failed to meet the UK National Air Quality Objective, with one diffusion tube on Selborne Road recording an annual average NO_{2} concentration of 61.0μg/m3.

=== Cycling ===
Transport for London (TfL) and the London Borough of Waltham Forest provide cycling infrastructure in Walthamstow. In 2014, cyclists made up approximately 8.41% of general traffic across the Borough, and in the same year, the Borough was awarded a "Mini Holland" grant by the Mayor of London to improve infrastructure and cycle routes across Walthamstow.

Cycling routes include:

- Quietway 2 – begins at Walthamstow Central and runs along low-traffic streets to Bloomsbury, via Walthamstow Marshes, Clapton, Hackney Central, Angel and Clerkenwell. The route is unbroken and signposted, but indirect.
- Lea Bridge Road Cycle Route – from Leytonstone to Clapton via Lea Bridge. The route runs on segregated cycle track parallel to the A104.
- Forest Road Cycle Route – from Walthamstow to Tottenham on cycle lanes and tracks adjacent to the A503.

The River Lea towpath is also nearby, which provides a direct, traffic-free cycle link from Walthamstow Marshes to Hackney Wick and Stratford to the south, and Tottenham Hale, Enfield Lock, Hertford and Harlow to the north. The towpath also carries National Cycle Route 1 (NCR 1), an unbroken, signposted cycle route from Dover to the Shetland Islands, which in North London carries cyclists from Canary Wharf to Enfield Lock via Victoria Park and Walthamstow Marshes. The route is a shared-use path maintained by the Canal and River Trust and Sustrans.

== Modern culture ==
- Walthamstow was home to the popular 1990s boy band East 17, who named themselves after the area's postal code E17, and titled their debut album Walthamstow.
- The artwork for Blur's Parklife album featured photos of the band at Walthamstow Stadium.
- Singer Jimmy Ray grew up in the Lloyd Park area and attended Winns primary, and Sidney Chaplin and McEntee secondary schools. In the early 1990s he performed at various E17 venues, including the Royal Standard, as part of local pop group 'The Cutting Room'. Ray later had solo hits in the UK and US.
- Major centre in London's grime music scene, with many bedroom studios and underground music enterprises. Artists include Lethal Bizzle and his band Fire Camp.
- The Bromheads Jacket song "Poppy Bird" references Walthamstow in the chorus.
- Small Wonder Records was located on Hoe Street in the late 1970s and early 1980s. It produced the first records by The Cure, Crass, Cockney Rejects, The Cravats and Bauhaus. The proprietor Pete Stenett closed the shop and label in 1982, but it was 'rebuilt' further down Hoe Street for the 40th anniversary of E17 punk in 2016.
- Walthamstow is mentioned in the Paul McCartney and Wings song "Old Siam, Sir" from the 1979 album Back to the Egg.
- "Long ago, outside a chip shop in Walthamstow" is the first line of a song named "Ann and Joe", recorded by The Barron Knights in the late 1970s. This was a spoof of "Long ago, high on a mountain in Mexico", the opening words of Angelo, which was a UK number one hit in 1977 for Brotherhood of Man.
- "Waiting in Walthamstow" is a song by The Cranberries from the album Roses.
- The track the "Battle of Epping Forest" by Genesis on the album Selling England by the Pound has lyrics based in the area such as "Along the Forest Road, there's hundreds of cars – luxury cars."
- The indie rock band The Rifles and the rock band The Bevis Frond.
- Educating the East End was filmed at Frederick Bremer School as its third series of the Educating TV show; its series was filmed in the 2013-2014 academic year, with its series broadcasting in late 2014.

=== Street art ===
Walthamstow's links with William Morris and art have led to an increasing number of street art and murals painted on public buildings. Some examples of street art in Walthamstow are shown below:

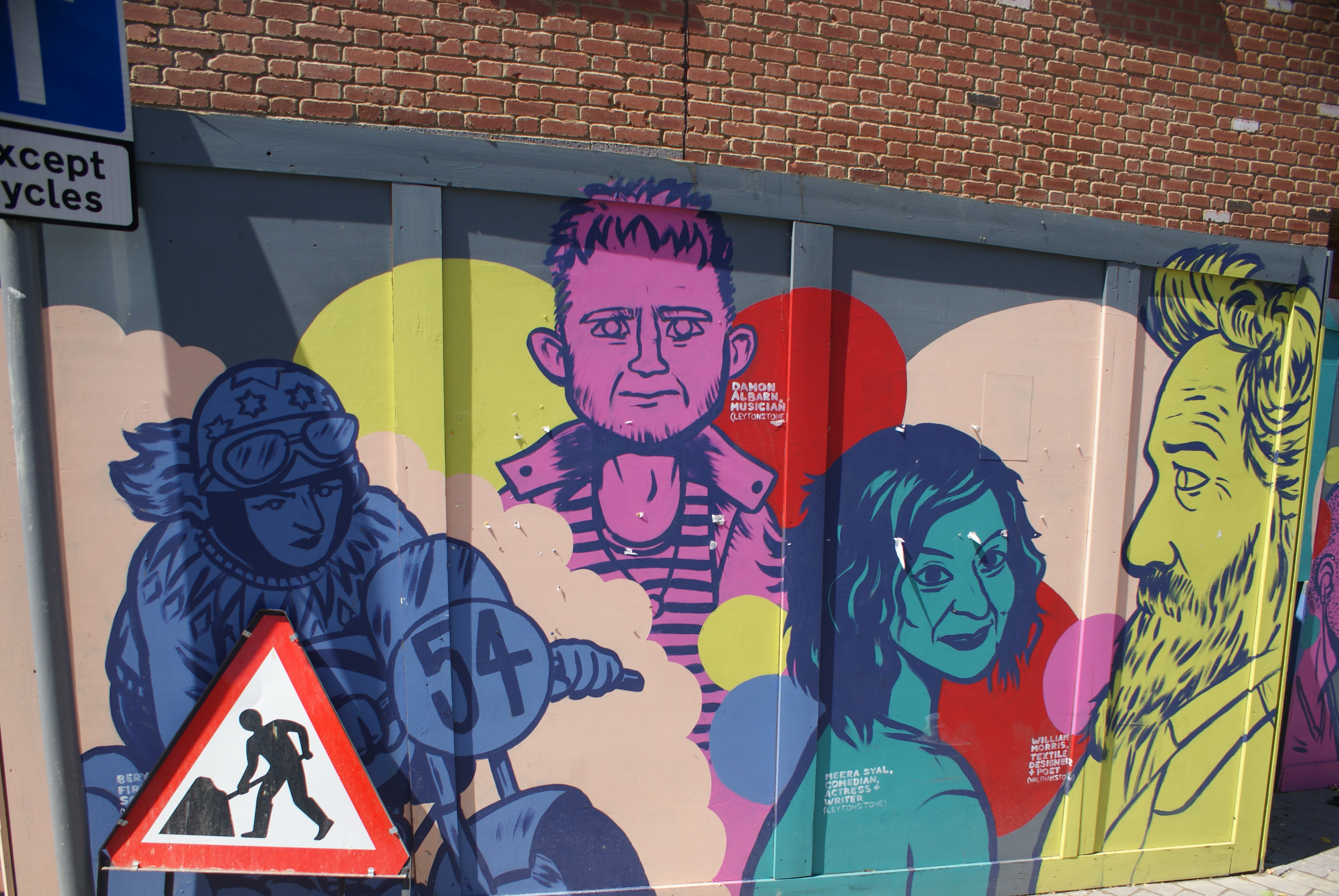
Hawthorne Road

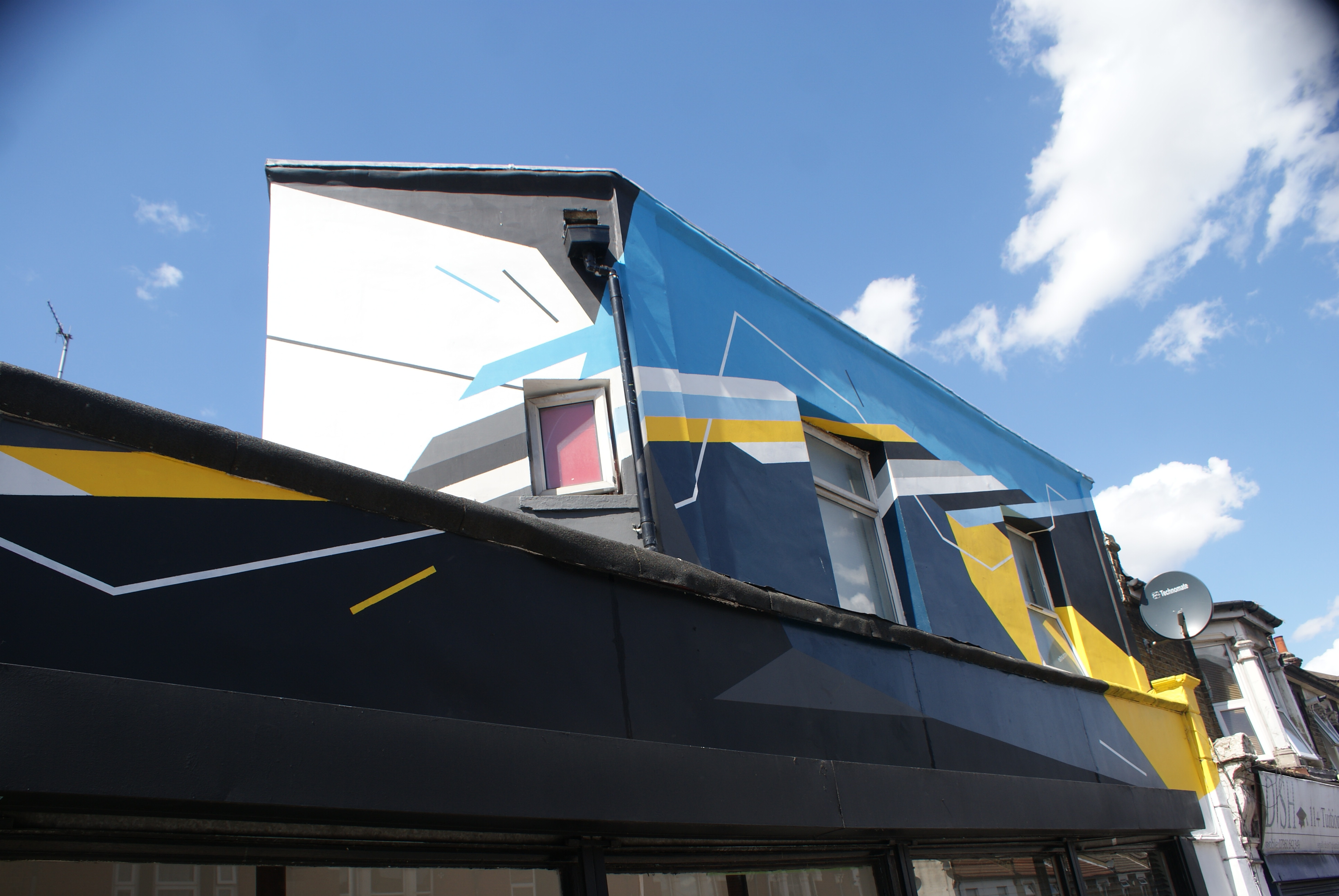
Chingford Road

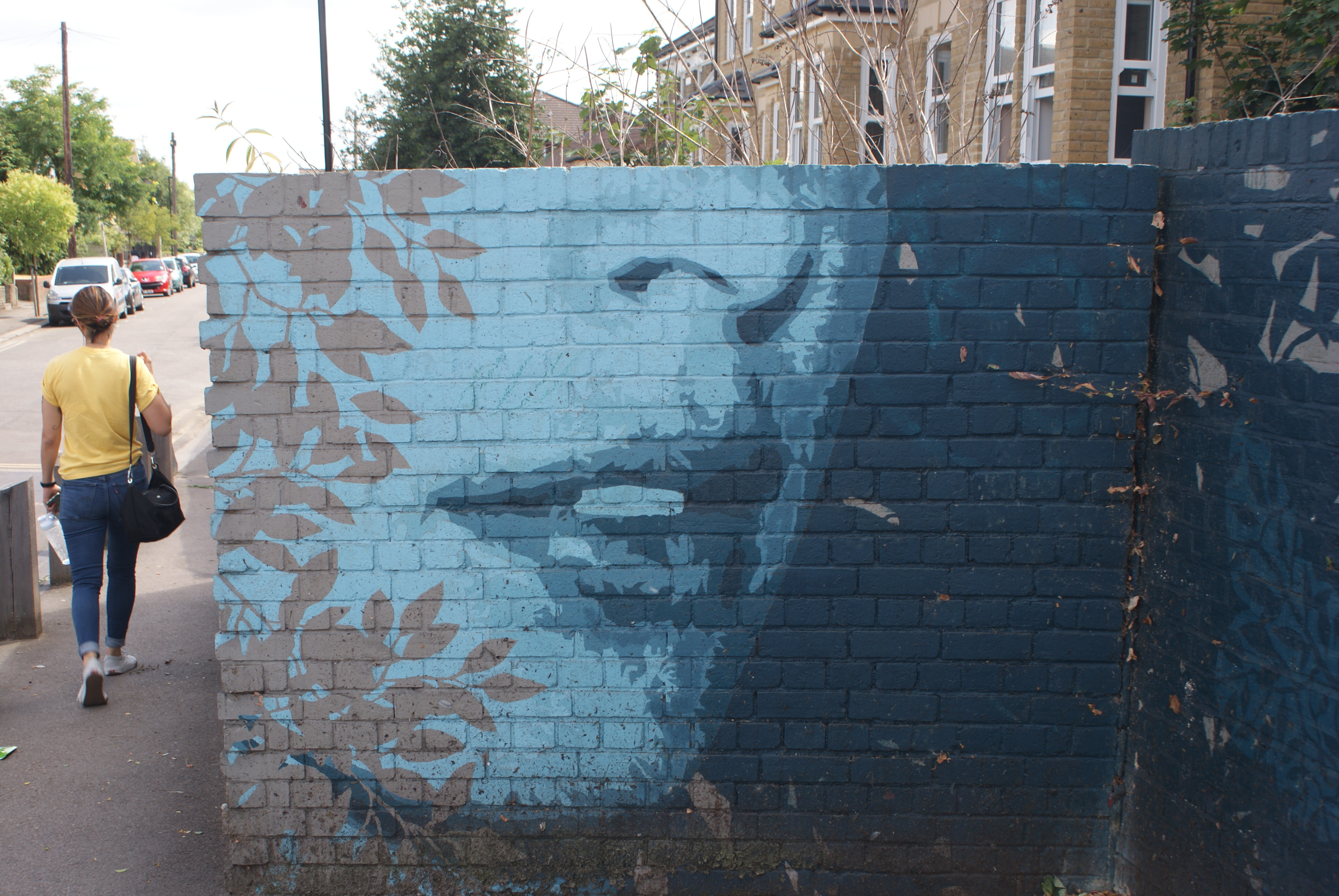
West Avenue

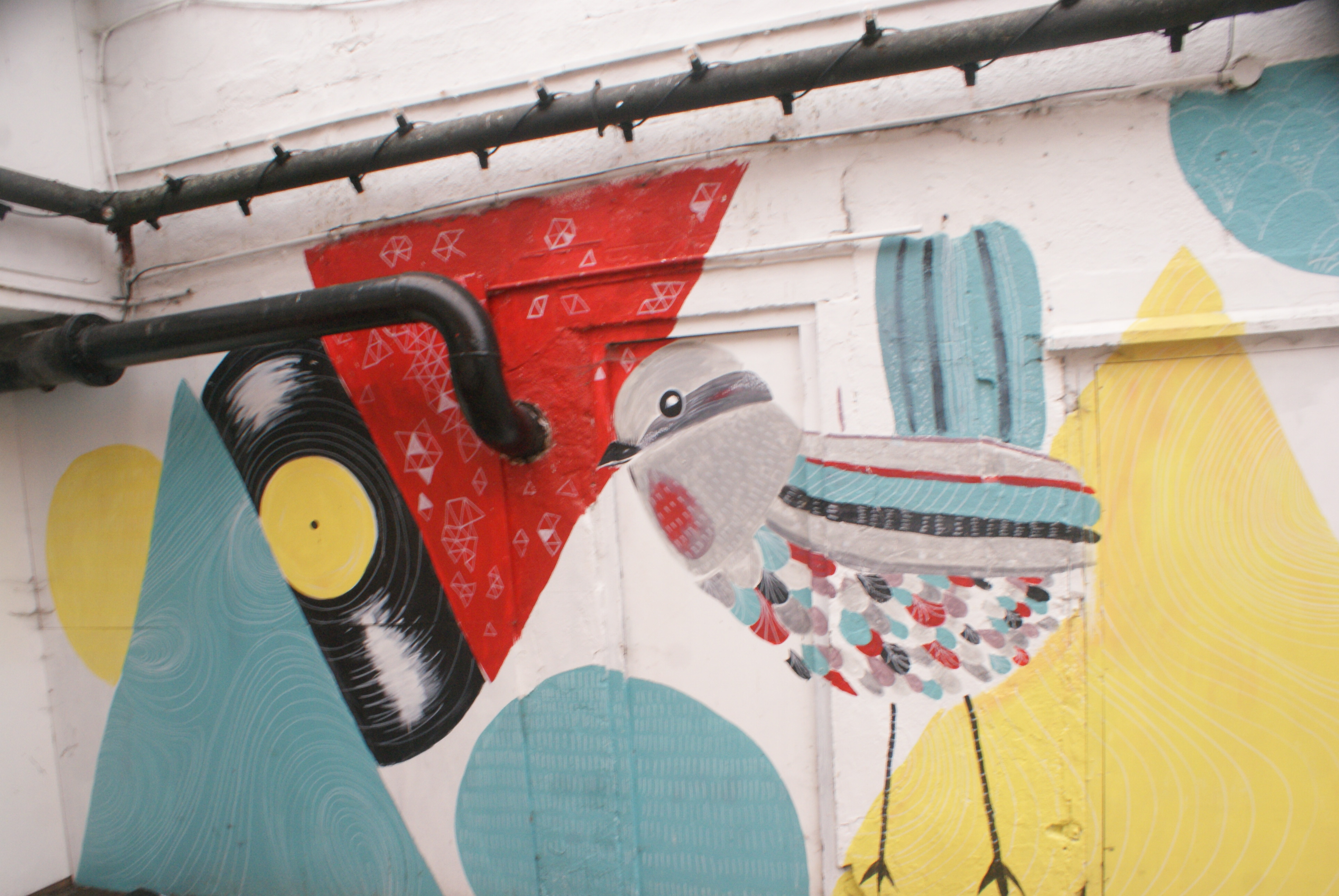
Hoe Street

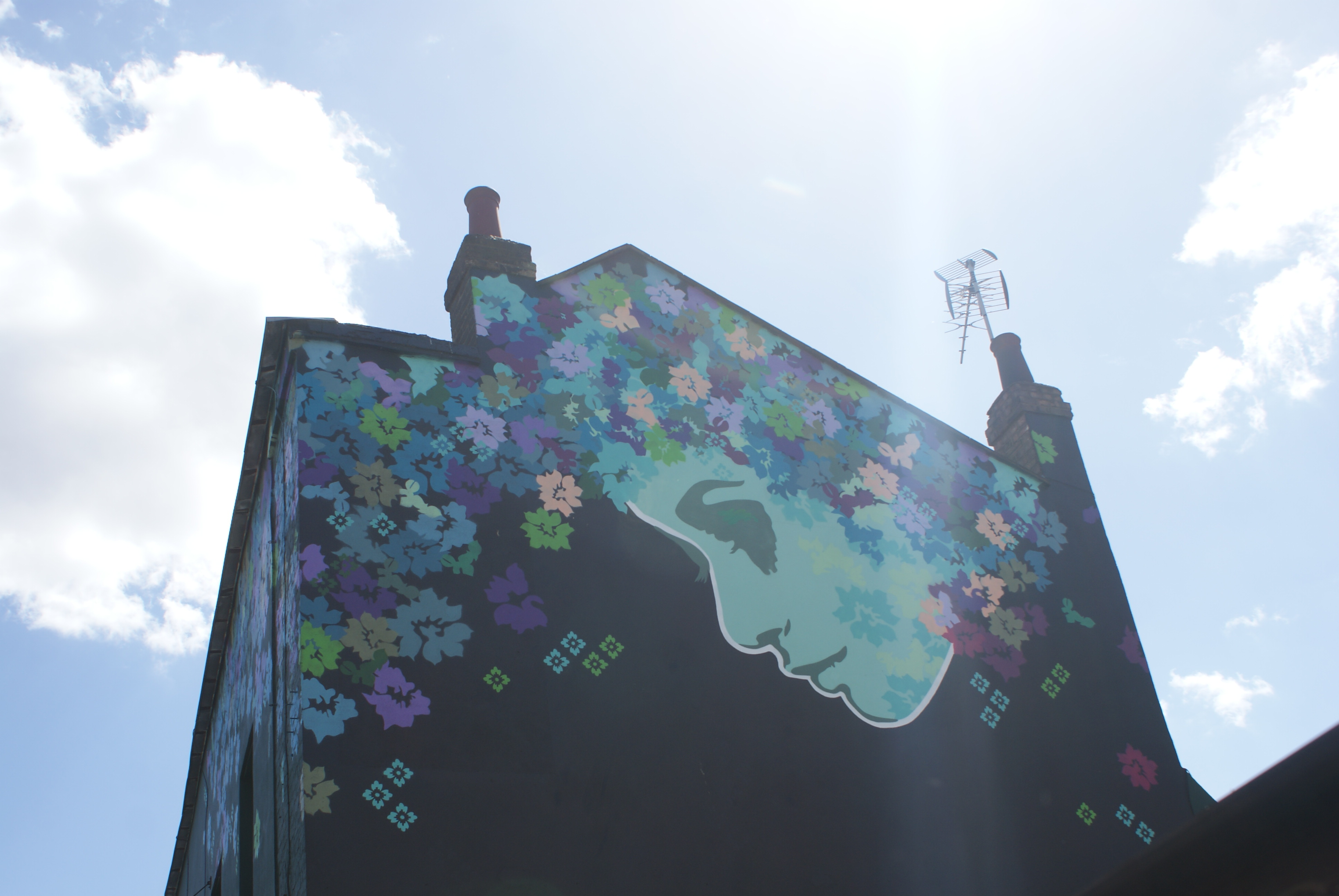
Wood Street

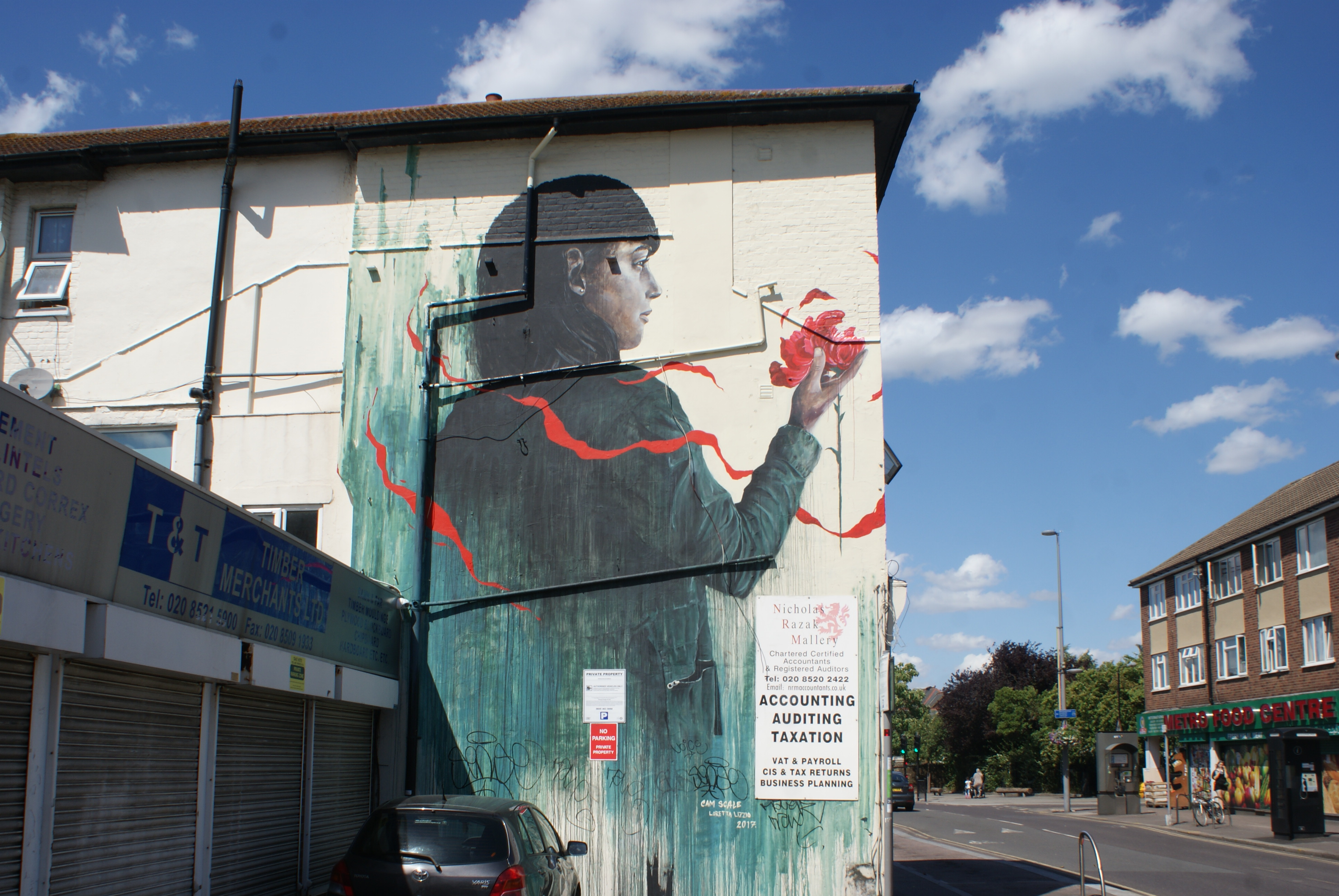
Wood Street

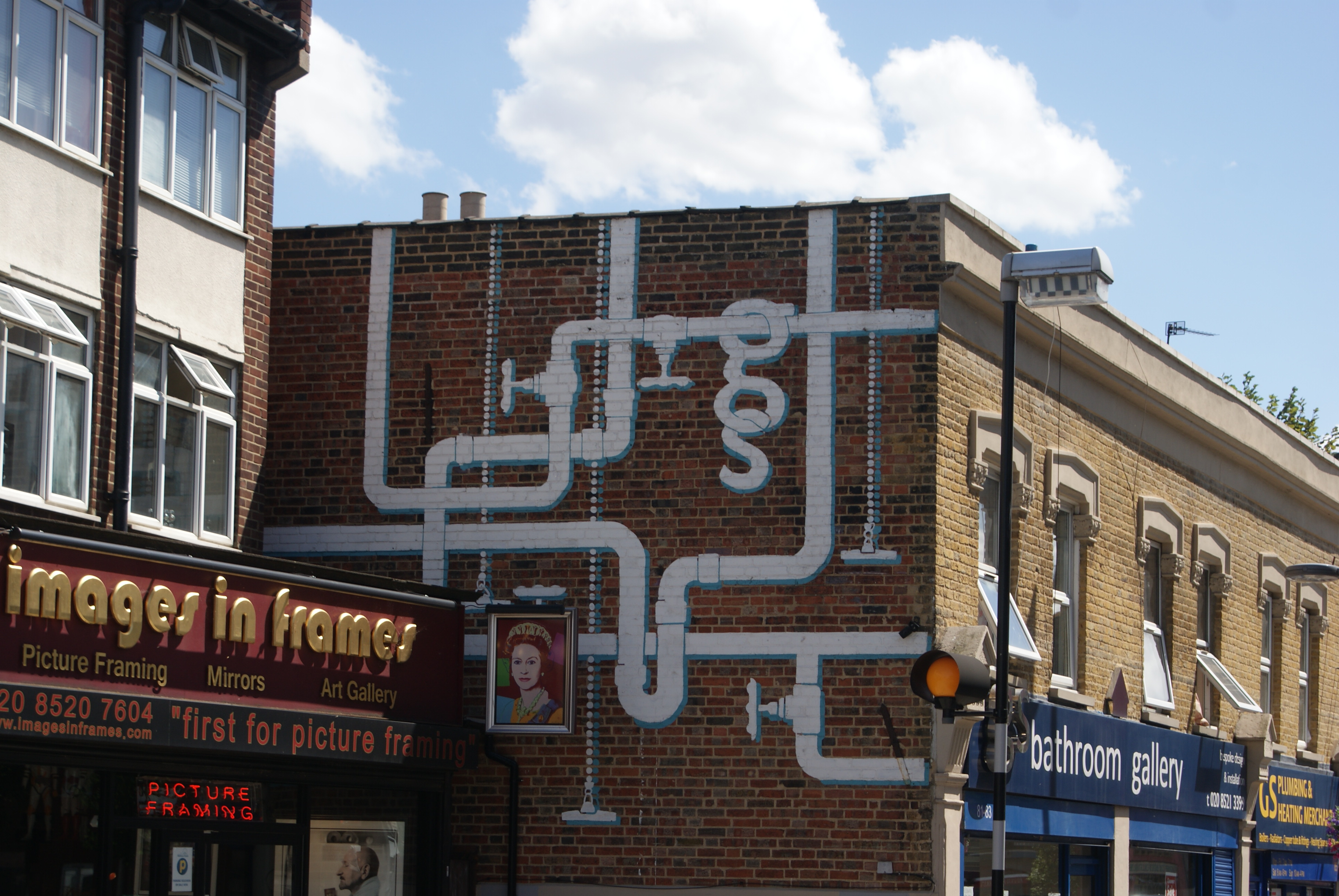
Wood Street

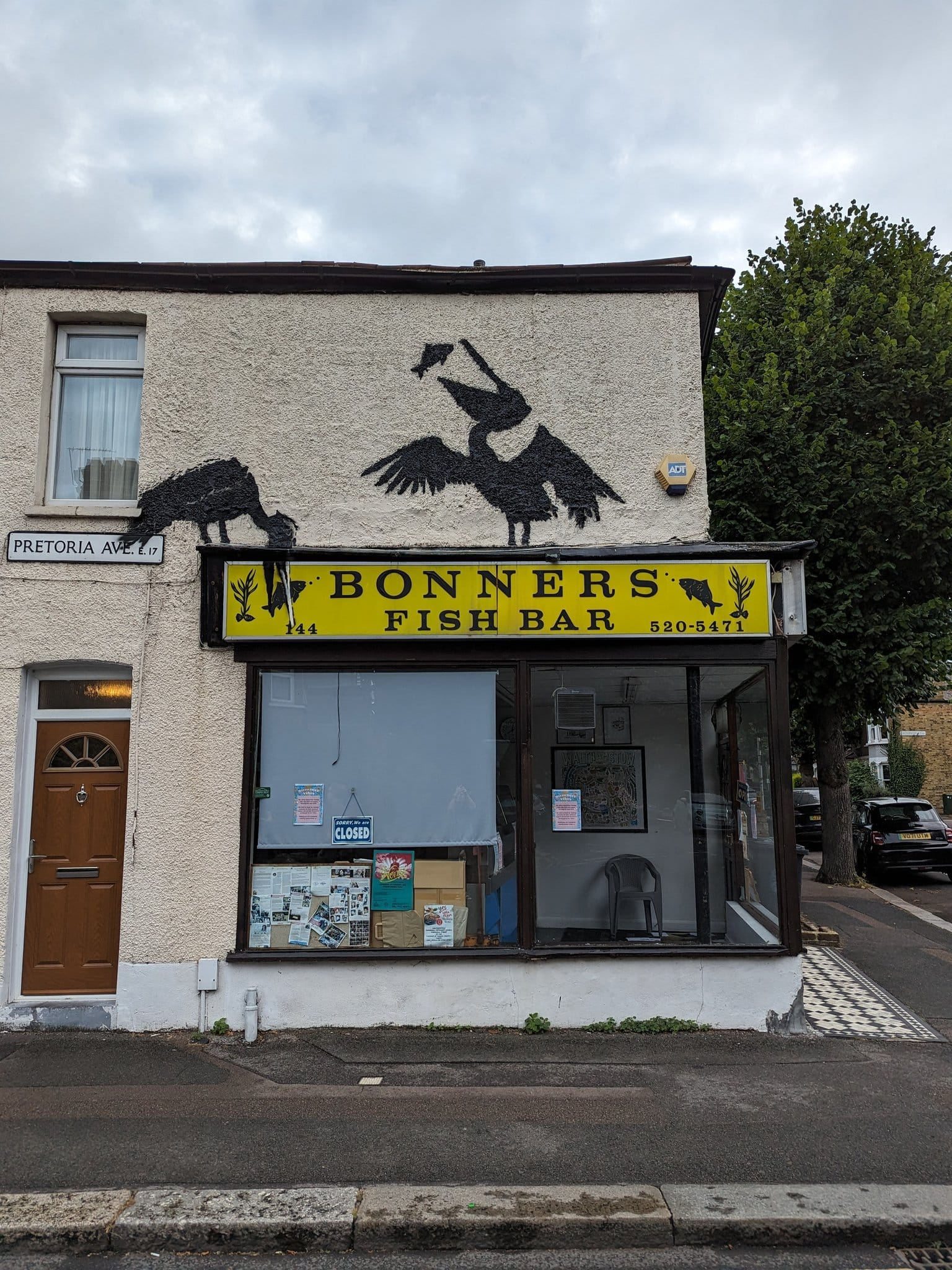
Pretoria Road

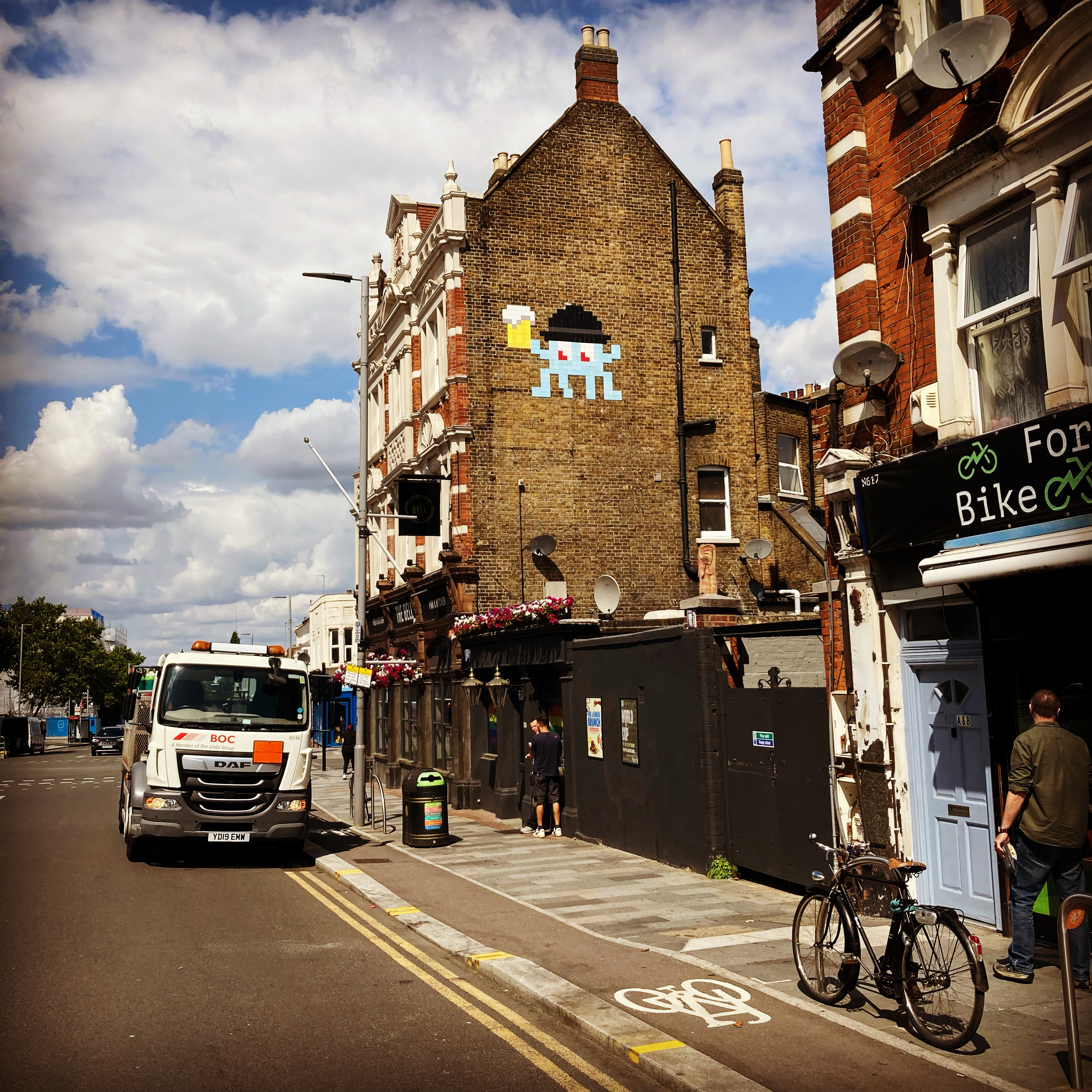
Forest Road

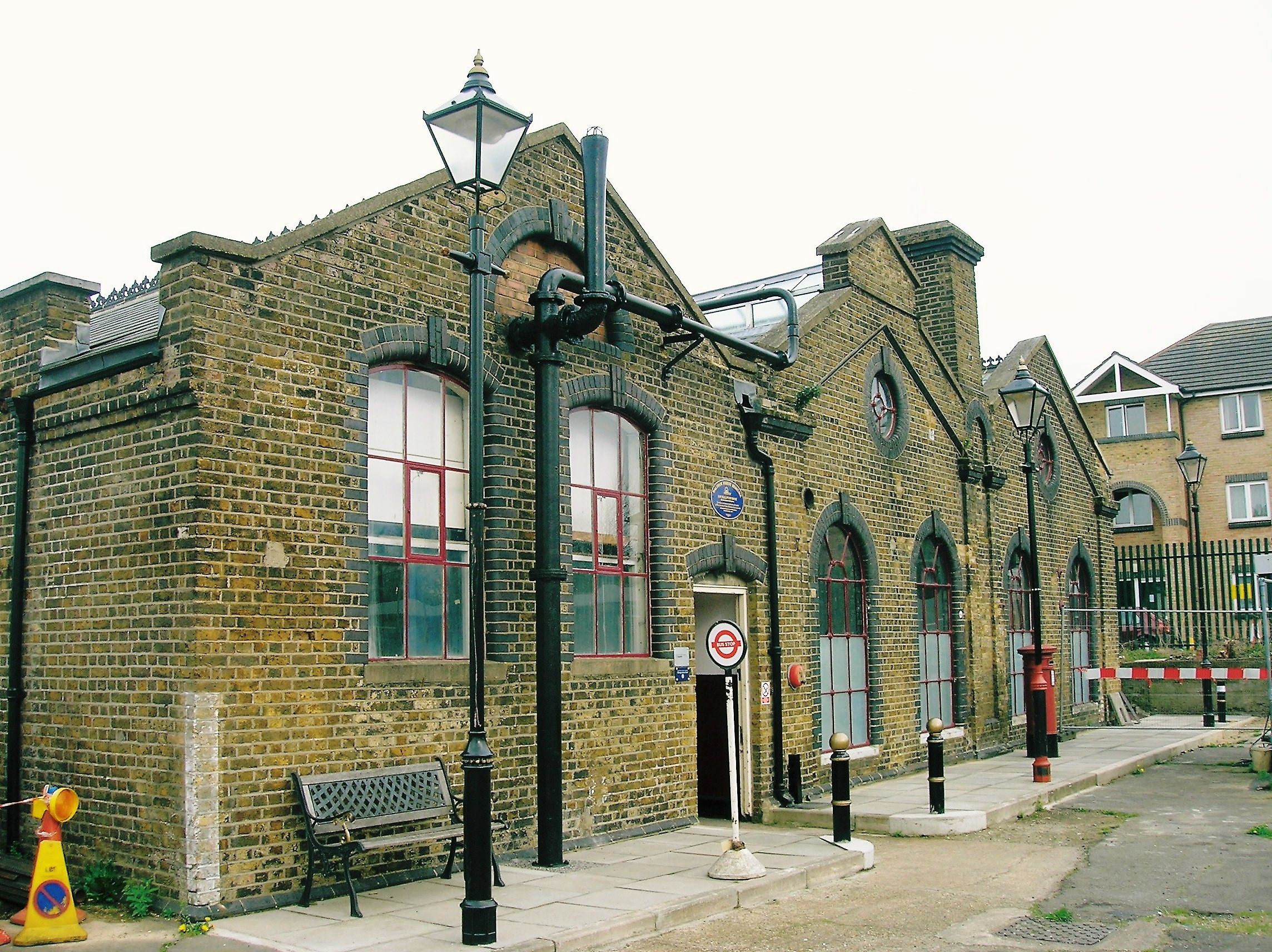
The Walthamstow Pumphouse Museum, a Grade II listed building

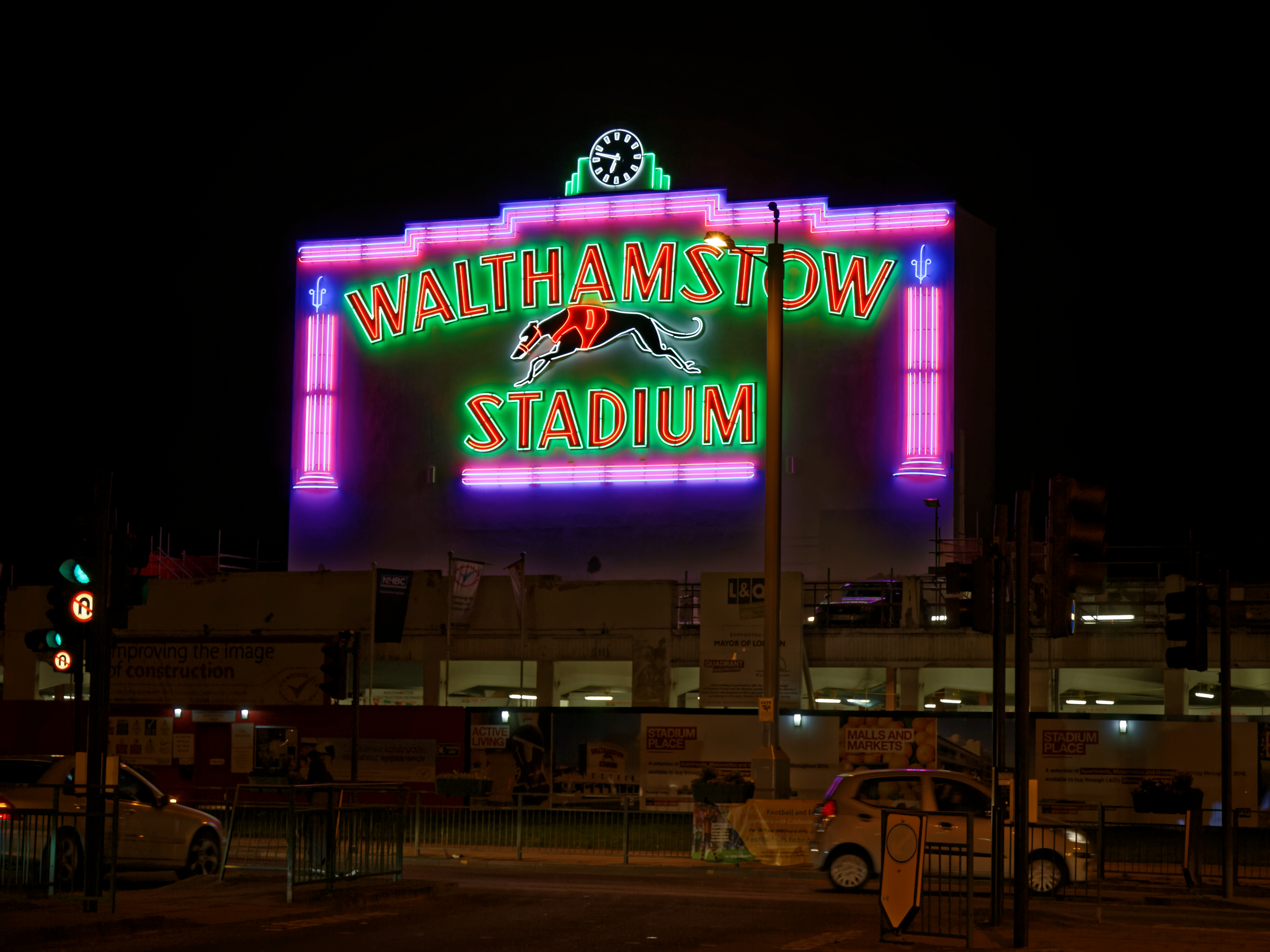
The newly restored historic neon sign of the Walthamstow Stadium in 2016

=== Cinema ===
An early British film studio the Walthamstow Studios operated in the area between 1914 and 1930.

The EMD (Granada) Walthamstow (formerly the Granada) is a Grade II listed cinema building in Hoe Street. The cinema also operated as a live music venue, with concerts by The Beatles, The Rolling Stones, John Coltrane, Little Richard, Gene Vincent, Jerry Lee Lewis, Alex Paterson, Johnny Cash, James Brown, The Who, Roy Orbison and Buddy Holly. It closed in 2003 when it was sold to the Universal Church of the Kingdom of God (UCKG), which sought permission for a change of use to a place of worship.

Many members of the local community opposed and successfully campaigned against the UCKG plans. Comedian and presenter Griff Rhys Jones, actor Paul McGann and writer Alain de Botton were among the famous names who backed local residents in asking the local authority to stop plans to convert the building into a church.

The Waltham Forest Film Society and Campaign to Save Our Cinema was the focal point for local campaigners.

UCKG failed to gain planning permission to convert the building from Waltham Forest Council and later from the then Secretary of State for Communities and Local Government, Eric Pickles. In 2014 the building was sold to a pub company who set up a bar in the grand foyer and began bringing it back into use as a venue. In 2019 Waltham Forest Council purchased the former auditorium with the intention of opening it as an entertainment venue in 2022.

The Empire cinema, a separate new multiplex, opened in December 2014 on Walthamstow market. It closed on 7 July 2023 when the chain went into administration. The cinema was subsequently badly damaged, and all the screens ripped, during an illegal rave in September 2023.

=== Sports clubs ===
- Walthamstow F.C.
- Walthamstow Avenue F.C. (defunct club located at Green Pond Road Stadium)
- Walthamstow Avenue & Pennant
- Waltham Forest Hockey Club
- Haringey & Waltham Development F.C.
- Walthamstow Cricket Club

== Education ==
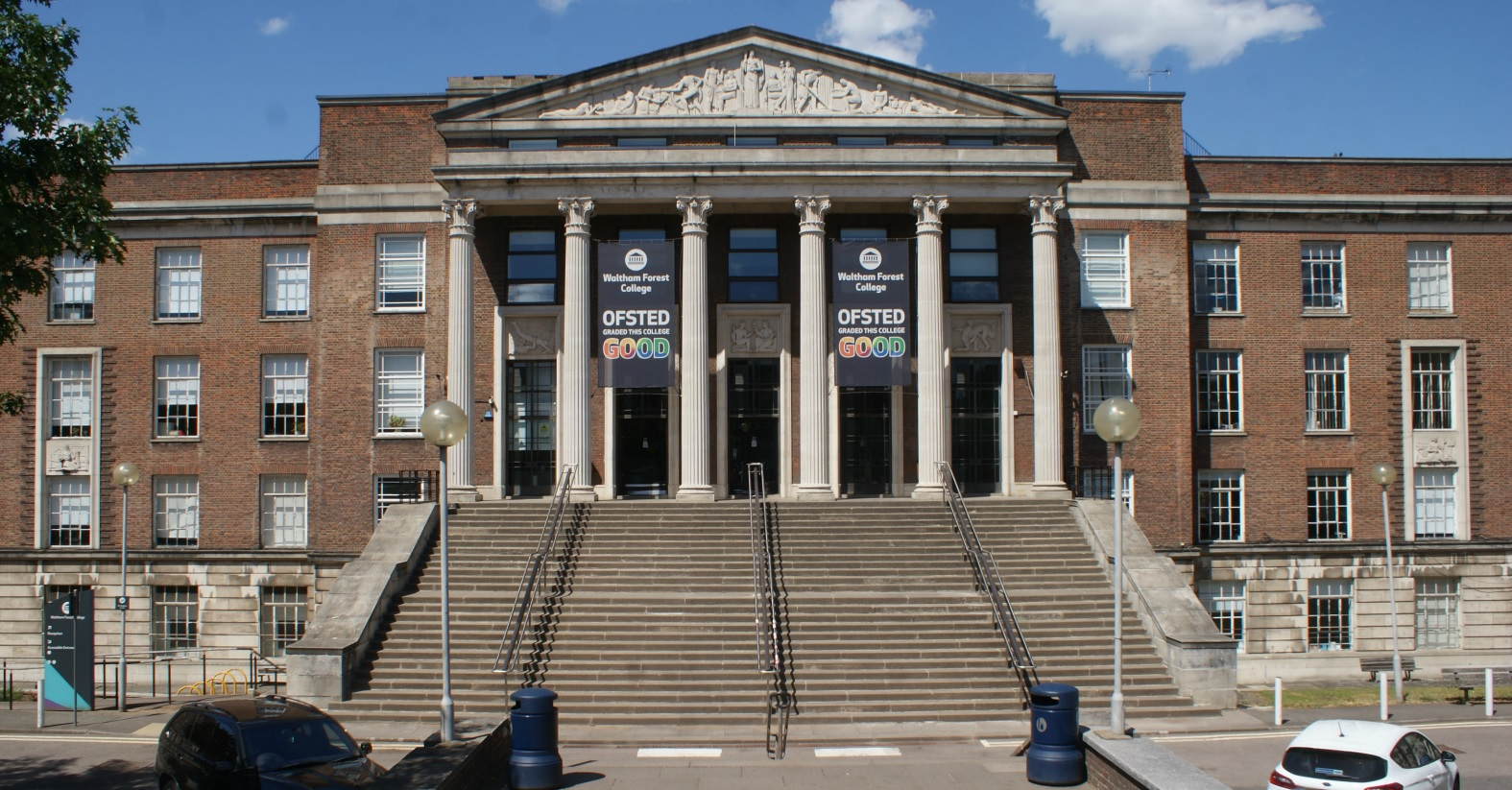
Entrance to Waltham Forest College

Walthamstow secondary schools include:

- Frederick Bremer School
- Forest School
- Holy Family Catholic School
- Kelmscott School
- Walthamstow Academy
- Walthamstow School for Girls
- Willowfield School

Sixth form and further education providers include:

- Big Creative Academy
- Sir George Monoux College
- Waltham Forest College

== Media ==
Local news is provided by the East London & West Essex Guardian (formerly Waltham Forest Guardian). The BBC Three sitcom Him & Her was filmed in Walthamstow.

== Notable residents ==
One of its most famous residents was the writer, poet, designer and socialist William Morris, who was born there on 24 March 1834, and lived there for several years. His former house in Walthamstow is a museum dedicated to his life and works, while the grounds of the house are a public park (Lloyd Park in Forest Road).

- Naomi Ackie, actress, attended Walthamstow School for Girls.
- Keith Albarn, manager of Soft Machine and father of Damon Albarn, taught art at Walthamstow Art College in the 1960s
- Sonita Alleyne, Master of Jesus College, Cambridge
- Clement Attlee, Member of Parliament for Walthamstow while he was Prime Minister.
- Edward Middleton Barry, architect, educated at a private school in Walthamstow.
- Sir William Batten (died 1667), Surveyor of the Navy, had a "palatial" country house at Walthamstow; his son, who was heavily in debt, sold it off a few years after his death.
- Stephen Bear, reality TV star
- Steve Bell (cartoonist), cartoonist, was born in Walthamstow
- Alonza Bevan, bass guitarist of Kula Shaker.
- Lethal Bizzle, Rap/Grime artist and associated rap collective Fire Camp, Attended Holy Family Catholic School.
- Peter Blake, artist, painted sleeve cover of the Beatles Sgt. Peppers Lonely Hearts Club Band.
- Leonard Borwick, concert pianist, born in 1868.
- Matthew Bourne, choreographer and dancer, was born in Walthamstow.
- Mick Box, guitarist for Uriah Heep, born in Walthamstow.
- William Theodore Brailey, pianist on the RMS Titanic
- Frederick Bremer, engineer and inventor, built the first petrol-driven car in Great Britain between 1892 and 1894 (now on display in the Vestry House Museum)
- David Cairns, guitarist with Secret Affair, was born in Walthamstow in 1958.
- Alexander Champion, founder of British whaling, died 1795 in Walthamstow
- Anjem Choudary, Islamic extremist and criminal
- Phil Collen, lead guitarist of Def Leppard
- Stella Creasy, Labour MP
- Iain Dale, broadcaster
- Sir John Dankworth, jazz musician, who attended Sir George Monoux Grammar School.
- Christopher Martin Davis, Bulgarian ice dancer, lives in Walthamstow.
- Paul Di'Anno, lead singer of Iron Maiden 1978–81.
- Lewis Weston Dillwyn FRS (1778–1855), porcelain manufacturer, naturalist and Member of Parliament
- Adam Devlin, guitarist for the Bluetones, lives in Walthamstow.
- Benjamin Disraeli, former British Prime Minister, attended Higham Hill School in Walthamstow, as did William Shore, later father of Florence Nightingale
- Ian Dury, singer and songwriter, studied at Walthamstow Art College.
- Fleur East, singer and The X Factor finalist (runners-up), attended Holy Family Catholic school
- East 17, British pop boy band, including singer/songwriter Brian Harvey.
- Sir George Edwards, designer of Concorde
- Mabel Elliott a British censor who uncovered a German spy during the First World War.
- Joe Ellis-Grewal, cricketer
- Lucian Ercolani, founder of furniture company Ercol, was living at 27 Claremont Road, Walthamstow in the 1911 census
- Paapa Essiedu, actor, grew up in Walthamstow
- Jody Fleisch, English professional wrestler, debuted in 1996, and is still wrestling around the world
- Nick Gentry, portrait artist, lives and works in Walthamstow
- Air Marshal Sir Kenneth Charles Michael Giddings, born in Walthamstow in 1920
- Thomas Field Gibson, manufacturer who aided the welfare of the Spitalfields silk weavers, lived at Elm House
- Maurice Glasman, social theorist and Labour life peer
- Eleanor Graham, book editor and children's book author, born in Walthamstow
- Peter Greenaway, film director, studied at Walthamstow College of Art
- Geordie Greep, musician and frontman of former rock band Black Midi
- Daisy Greville, Countess of Warwick, heir to the Maynard estate and Shern Hall in particular at which she lived briefly after her father's death
- Fitz Hall, retired English footballer, was born in Walthamstow
- Darren Hayman, singer and songwriter, former resident
- Lord Peter Hennessy of Nympsfield, former journalist with The Times; historian, academic and author
- James Hilton, author, attended George Monoux Grammar School
- Helen Hollick, writer, born in Walthamstow 1953
- Mick Hume, journalist
- Countess Judith, wife of Earl Waltheof, prominent post-Conquest woman
- Harry Kane, footballer, attended Chingford Foundation School
- Colin Kazim-Richards, footballer, was born in Leytonstone but schooled in Walthamstow
- Jane Lomax-Smith, Australian politician and doctor; was born and raised here
- Agnes Marshall, English culinary entrepreneur, born in Walthamstow in 1855
- Sir George Monoux, Lord Mayor of London in 1514 and local benefactor; founded the grammar school and almshouses
- William Morris, designer, socialist and artist
- Fabrice Muamba, footballer, attended Kelmscott School
- Lutalo Muhammad, British taekwondo athlete, won a silver medal in the 2016 Olympics, attended Holy Family Catholic School
- Denis Payton, saxophonist for the Dave Clark Five, was born in Walthamstow 1943
- Grayson Perry, ceramicist and 2003 Turner Prize winner, had his studio in Walthamstow until 2014. He referred to Walthamstow in his 2013 Reith lectures, naming it 'Awesomestow'
- Pascale Petit, poet, nominated twice for the TS Eliot poetry prize
- Ernie Phypers (1910–1960), professional footballer
- Fred Pontin, holiday camp owner
- Jimmy Ray, recording artist, born Walthamstow 1970
- Danny Robins, comedy writer and performer, broadcaster and journalist
- Ken Russell, film director, studied at Walthamstow Technical College
- Nick Saloman, progressive rock musician
- June Sarpong, television presenter, born Walthamstow 1977
- Baroness Scotland, Attorney General, grew up in Walthamstow and attended Walthamstow School for Girls
- Vivian Stanshall, musician, painter, singer, broadcaster, songwriter, poet and writer, best known for his work with the Bonzo Dog Doo-Dah Band, grew up in Grove Road, Walthamstow.
- John Kemp Starley, inventor, born Walthamstow 1854
- Colin Stinton, Canadian-born actor
- Beryl Swain (1936–2007), motorcycle racer, first woman to compete in the Isle of Man TT race
- Thomas Griffith Taylor (1890–1963), Antarctic explorer
- Ron Todd (1927-2005), trade union leader
- Lawrence Trent, international chess master and commentator
- Leicester Tunks (1880–1935), operatic baritone and actor, born in Walthamstow
- Nicola Walker, actor, attended Forest School
- Peter Waterfield, Olympic diver
- Dorothy Wedderburn, Principal of Bedford College and Royal Holloway and Bedford New College, both London University, was born in Walthamstow 1925
- Geoffrey Wellum, RAF fighter pilot in the Battle of Britain was born Walthamstow in 1921
- Danniella Westbrook, actress
- Sir Robert Wigram, shipbuilder and MP
- Timothy Williams, bilingual novelist of crime fiction, lived at Whipps Cross
- Janet Wallis, philanthropist and the founder of the Mission of Hope
- Peter Winch, philosopher
- Eric Wolf, Marxist anthropologist, studied at Forest School
- Adam Woodyatt, English actor who plays Ian Beale in EastEnders, born in Walthamstow 1968
- Mina Zdravkova, Bulgarian ice dancer, lives in Walthamstow.

== Gallery ==
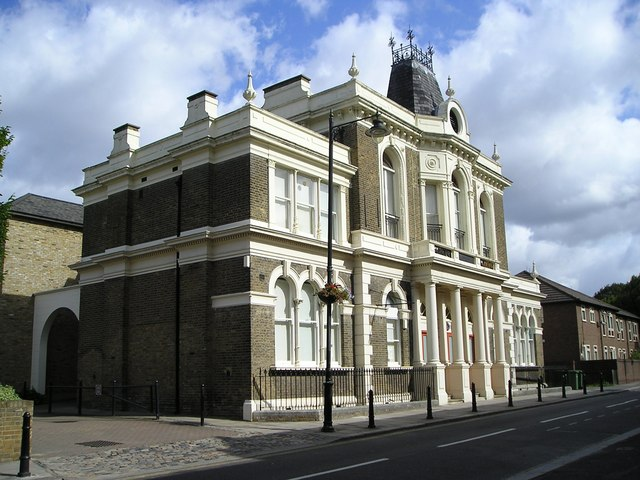
Old Town Hall, Walthamstow, now Yiguandao UK headquarters

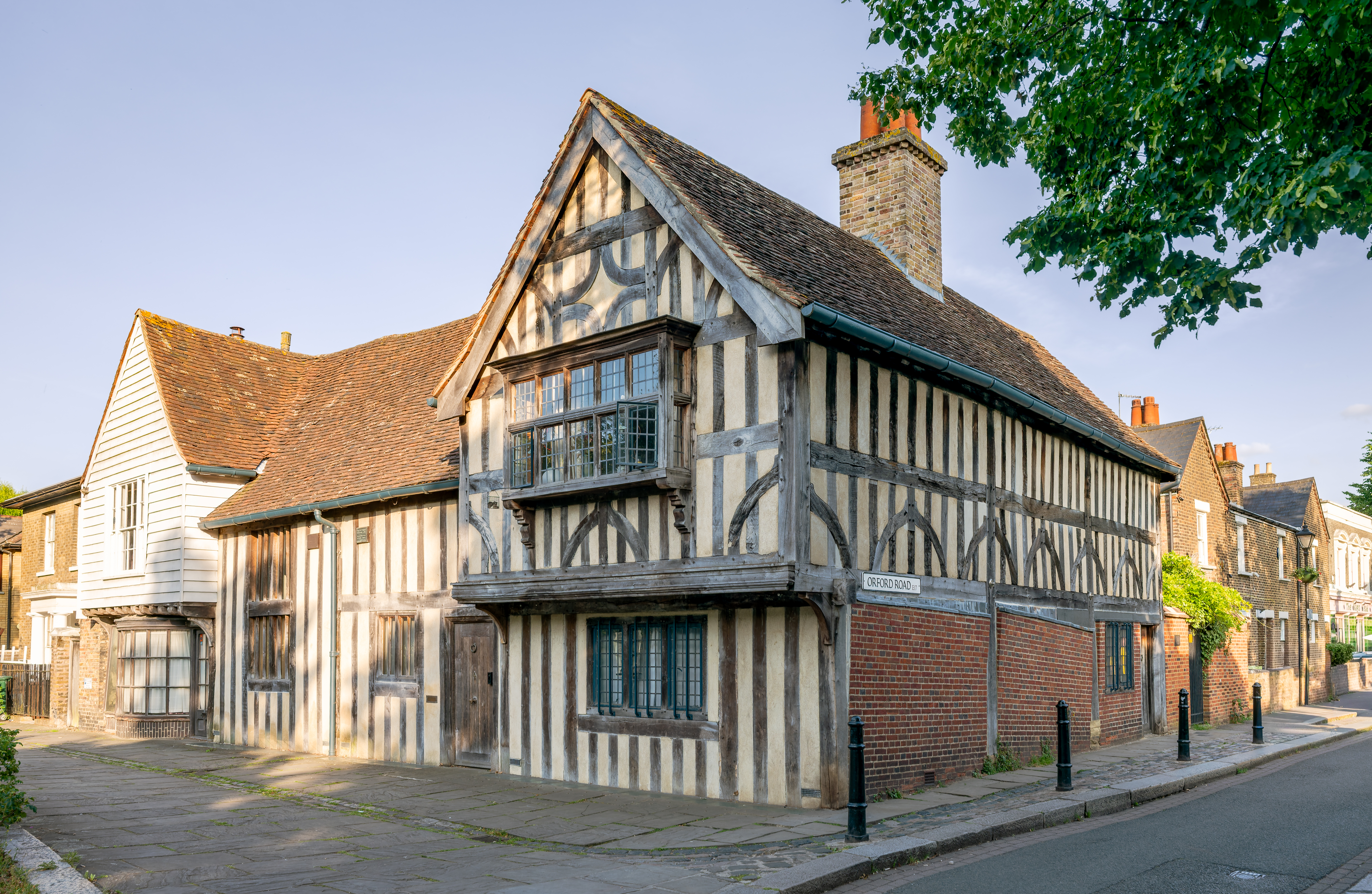
15th century "Ancient House" in Walthamstow village

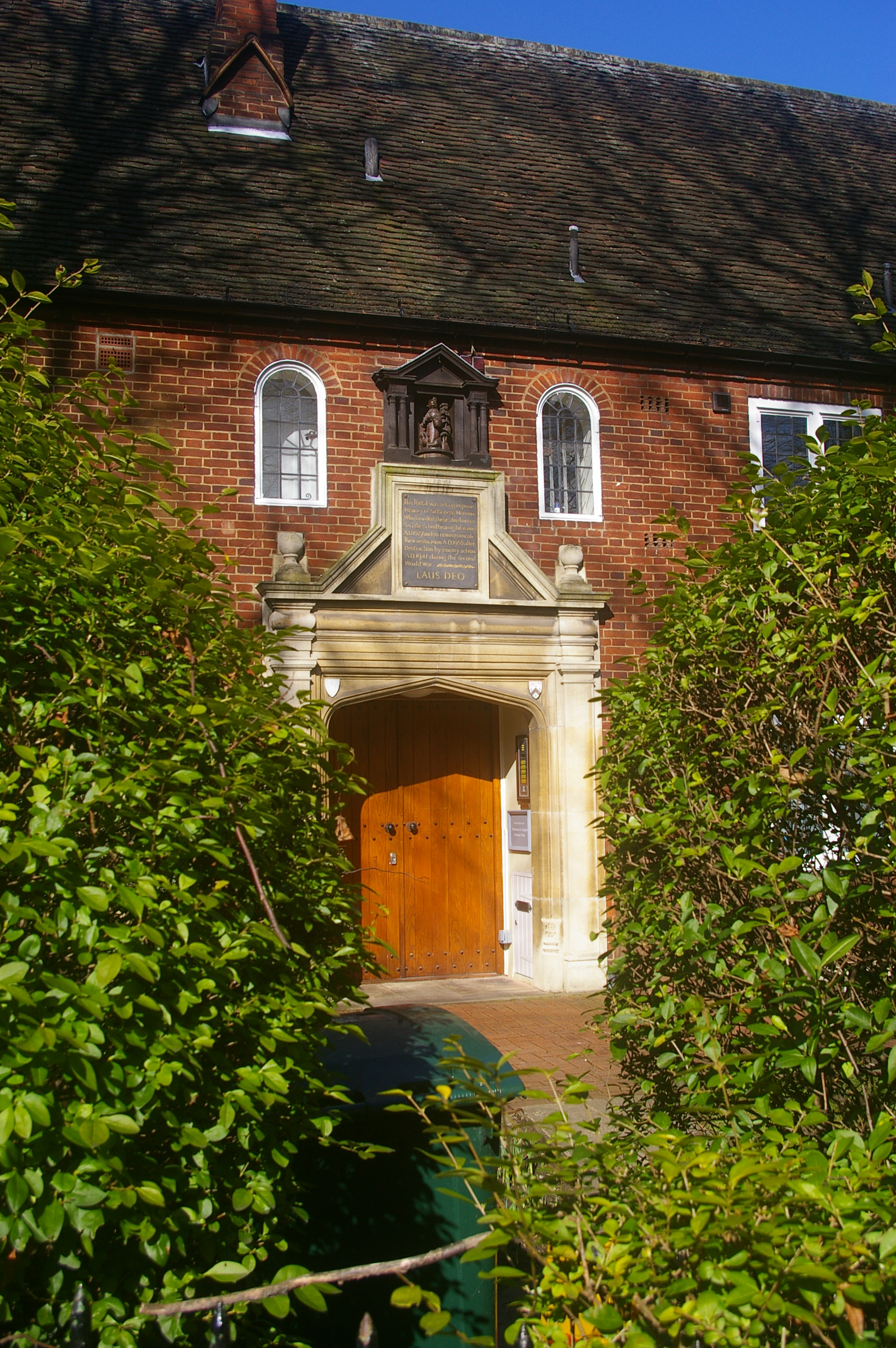
Monoux Almshouses in the village

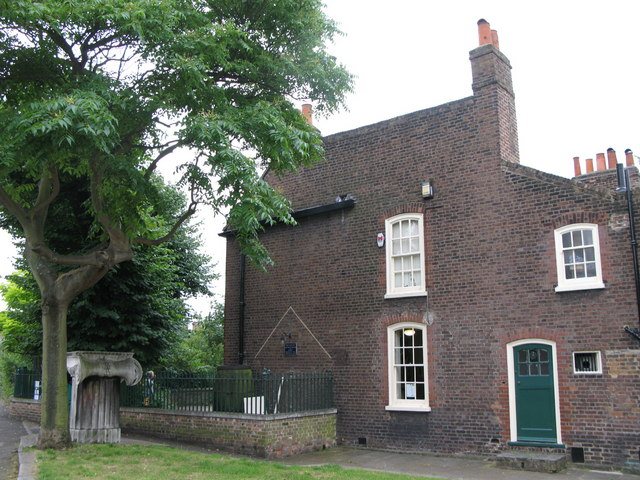
Vestry House Museum

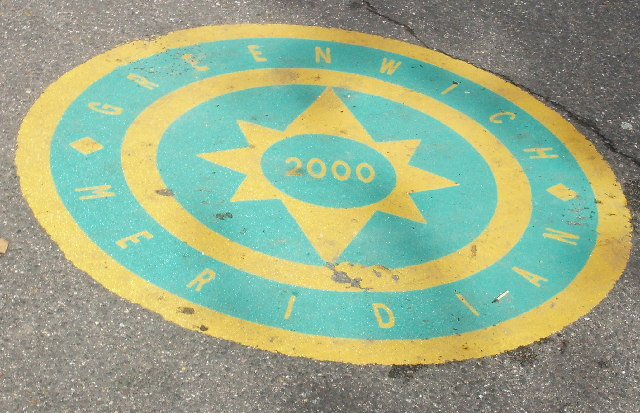
Longitude zero marker in Upper Walthamstow Road

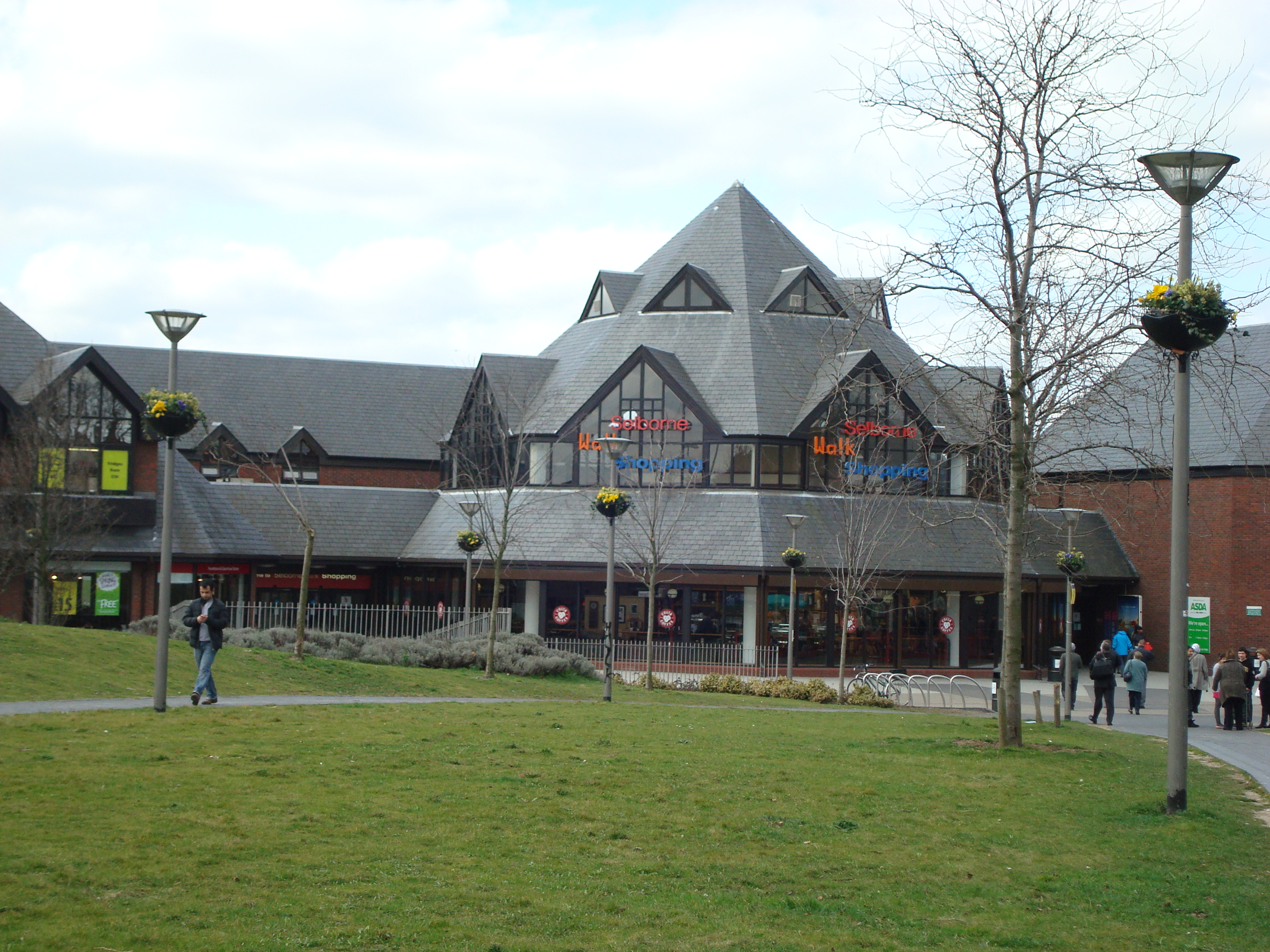
The 17&Central Shopping Centre before construction work in 2010

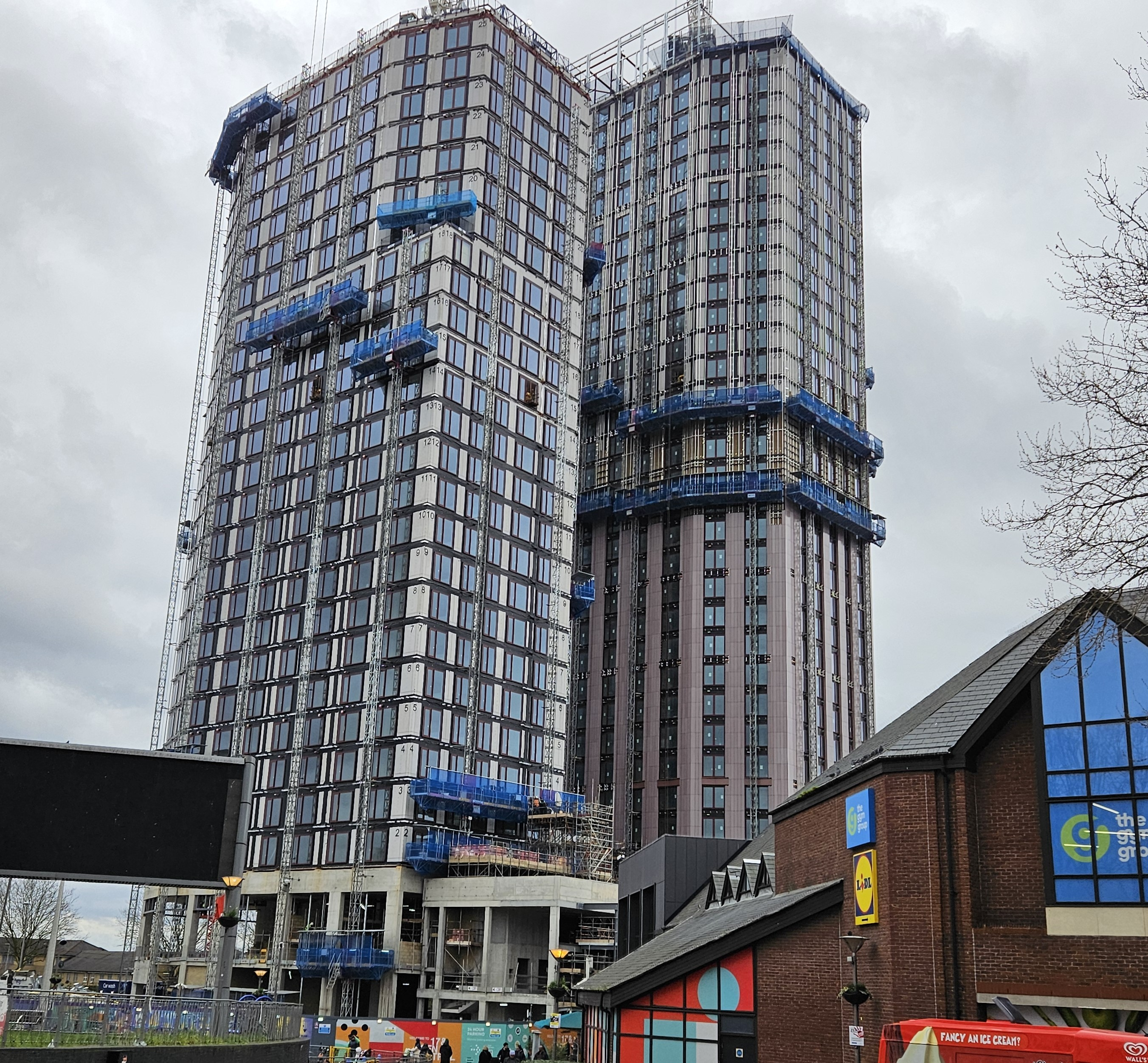
New homes under construction adjacent to the 17&Central shopping centre in 2024

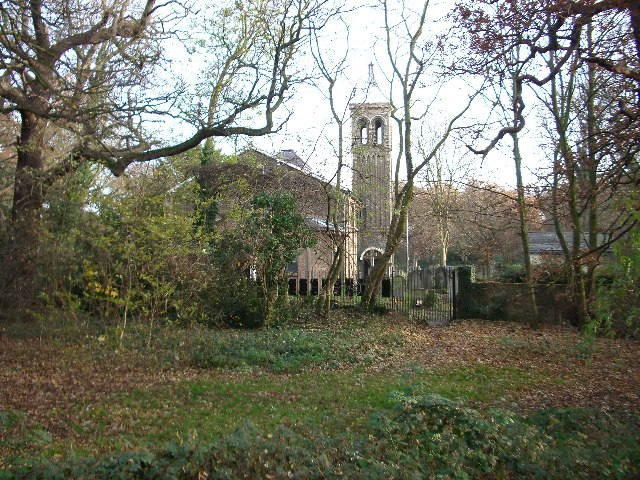
St Peter-in-the-Forest church, near Woodford New Road in the southern edge of Epping Forest

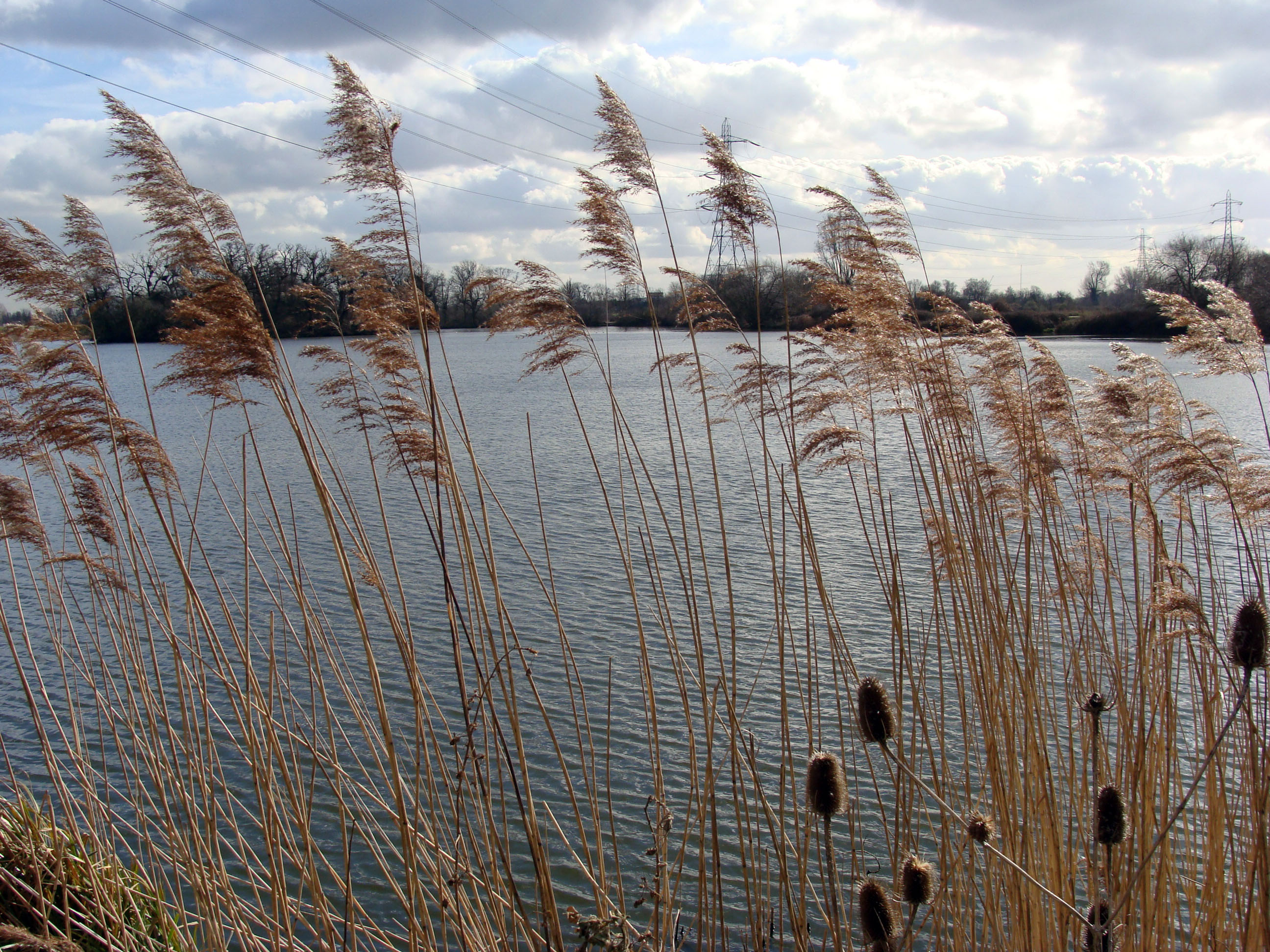
Walthamstow Reservoir

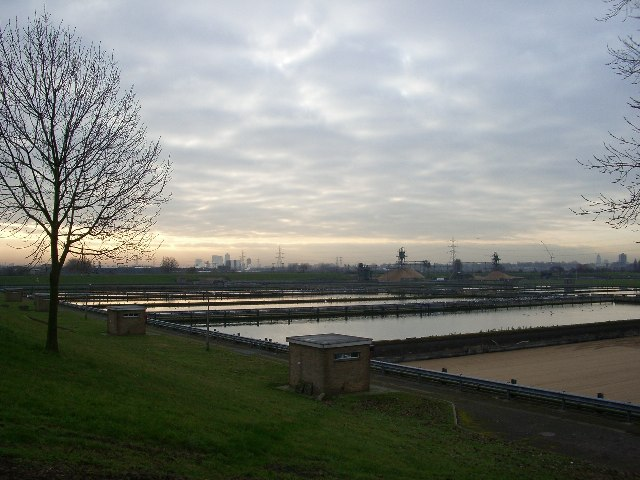
The filter beds at Coppermills Treatment Works
