= Walthamstow Market =

Daily outdoor market in London Borough of Waltham Forest

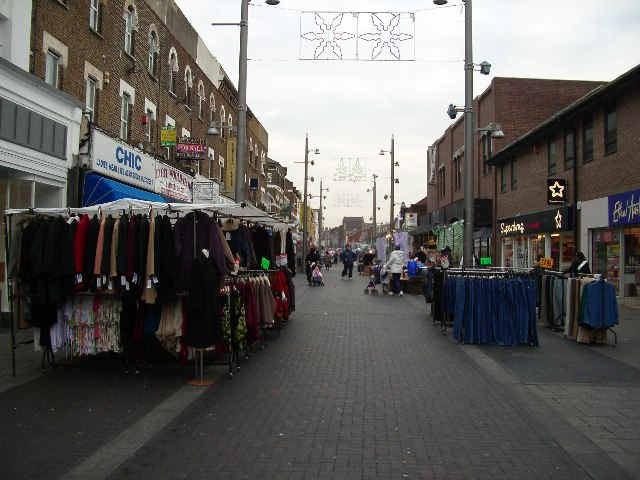
- The market runs along the pedestrianised high street
- Location: High Street; Walthamstow, Waltham Forest, Greater London; 51.583°N 0.027°W
- Opening date: 1885
- Management: Waltham Forest London Borough Council
- Owner: Waltham Forest London Borough Council
- Environment: Outdoor
- Goods sold: General goods, food, clothes
- Days normally open: Tuesday–Saturday
- Number of tenants: Approximately 100
- Interactive map of Walthamstow Market

Walthamstow Market, in the London Borough of Waltham Forest, is the second longest outdoor market in Europe, the longest being the Porta Portese in Rome, which is 2 km long. It occupies all but the last 100 metres (330 ft) of Walthamstow's High Street. It is reputed to be a mile long, but in fact measures approximately one kilometre.

== History and characteristics of the area ==
The 19th century Marsh Street, a rural lane, was transformed into the High Street by Victorian expansion. The street market dates from 1885. Today it is the centre of Walthamstow, with the main rail and tube station, bus station, post office and Central Library, and most of the commercial development and activity located around the High Street.

Five days a week (Tuesday - Saturday), the High Street is dominated by Walthamstow Market, and Saturdays are crowded. The Town Square, adjacent to the main market, is home to an occasional Saturday French market. On Sundays the street is quieter, with some shops and cafes open. There is a Sunday morning farmers market at the Town Square.

The street market stretches the entire length of the High Street, apart from the last 100 metres of the street, and has about 500 stalls. The street is lined with shops of different sizes, from small traditionally sized shops to large supermarkets. Generally, the shops do not extend into the side streets, which are densely populated with terraced houses.

The High Street area has a diverse, ethnically mixed population. Forty-one per cent of residents (in the ward as a whole) are classified as black or minority ethnic, mostly Pakistani and African-Caribbean.

The market has kept a traditional cockney feel whilst absorbing influences from the diverse cultures of the area. The overall tone is downmarket but with many interesting and enjoyable aspects.

== High street chains ==
There are two main areas of new building along the High Street beside the market, each containing a supermarket*

Sainsbury's supermarket is set in a development which includes a few other shops, which use the street frontage that Sainsbury's does not need, and a two-storey car park above. There is a lift connecting the public car park to the supermarket.

The Mall Selborne Walk is a much larger complex with shop frontages on the High Street, and an indoor shopping mall. Most of the units are chains, the largest being Asda supermarket. Selborne Road, which runs parallel to the High Street, provides access for cars and buses. On that side the complex presents a blank facade except for one pedestrian entrance, and the car park ramps.

== Independent retailers ==
There are many independent small shops specialising in ethnic foods (Polish, Russian, Indian, Chinese, Caribbean, South Asian etc.), Halal and English butchers, fabrics, household goods, etc. There are many cafes: English, Indian, Turkish, Portuguese, Chinese and others, and just one public house, the Chequers.

== Market infrastructure and management ==
The market is managed by the London Borough of Waltham Forest, with a 2019 redesign and development of the market completed by Matter Architecture and Mima Group.

== Transport links ==
Public transport access
London Buses	Walthamstow bus station 20, 34, 55, 58, 69, 97, 212, 215, 230, 257, 275, 357, SL1, SL2, W11, W12, W15, W19; St. James Street station 158, 212, 230, 275, 675, W11, W12
London Underground	Walthamstow Central
London Overground	St. James Street, Walthamstow Central
