= Ernie Phypers =

English footballer (1910–1960)

Personal information
- Full name: Ernest Phypers
- Date of birth: 13 September 1910
- Place of birth: Walthamstow, England
- Date of death: 1960 (aged 49–50)
- Height: 5 ft 8 1/2 in (1.74 m)
- Position: Wing half

Senior career*
Years	Team	Apps	(Gls)
	Walthamstow Avenue	0	(0)
1932–1933	Aston Villa	0	(0)
1933	Tottenham Hotspur	?	(?)
1933–1934	Northfleet United	0	(0)
1934–1936	Tottenham Hotspur	30	(0)
1939	Doncaster Rovers	3	(0)
- * Club domestic league appearances and goals

Ernest Phypers (13 September 1910 – 1960) was an English professional footballer who played for Walthamstow Avenue, Aston Villa, Tottenham Hotspur, Northfleet United and Doncaster Rovers.

== Football career ==
Phypers began his career at non-league club Walthamstow Avenue. The wing half joined Aston Villa as an amateur in September 1932 before Tottenham Hotspur offered him a contract in May, 1933. Phypers went on to play for the "Spurs" nursery club Northfleet United until he signed professional forms for Tottenham in June, 1934. He played a total of 33 matches in all competitions for the "Lilywhites" between 1934 and 1936. After leaving White Hart Lane Phypers signed for Doncaster Rovers and made a further three appearances. During World War II he made guest appearances for Clapton Orient, Southend United and West Ham United.
