= London Buses route SL2 =

London Superloop express bus route

SL2
- Arriva London BYD BD11B at Walthamstow bus station in September 2026

Overview
- Operator: Arriva London
- Garage: Tottenham
- Vehicle: BYD BD11B
- Peak vehicle requirement: 16 (March 2024)
- Began service: 2 March 2024
- Night-time: No night service

Route
- Start: Walthamstow bus station
- Via: South Woodford; Woodford; Gants Hill; Ilford; Barking; UEL Docklands Campus
- End: North Woolwich
- Length: 12 miles (19 km)

Service
- Level: Daily
- Frequency: Every 12-15 minutes
- Journey time: 45-80 minutes
- Operates: 05:00 until 01:17

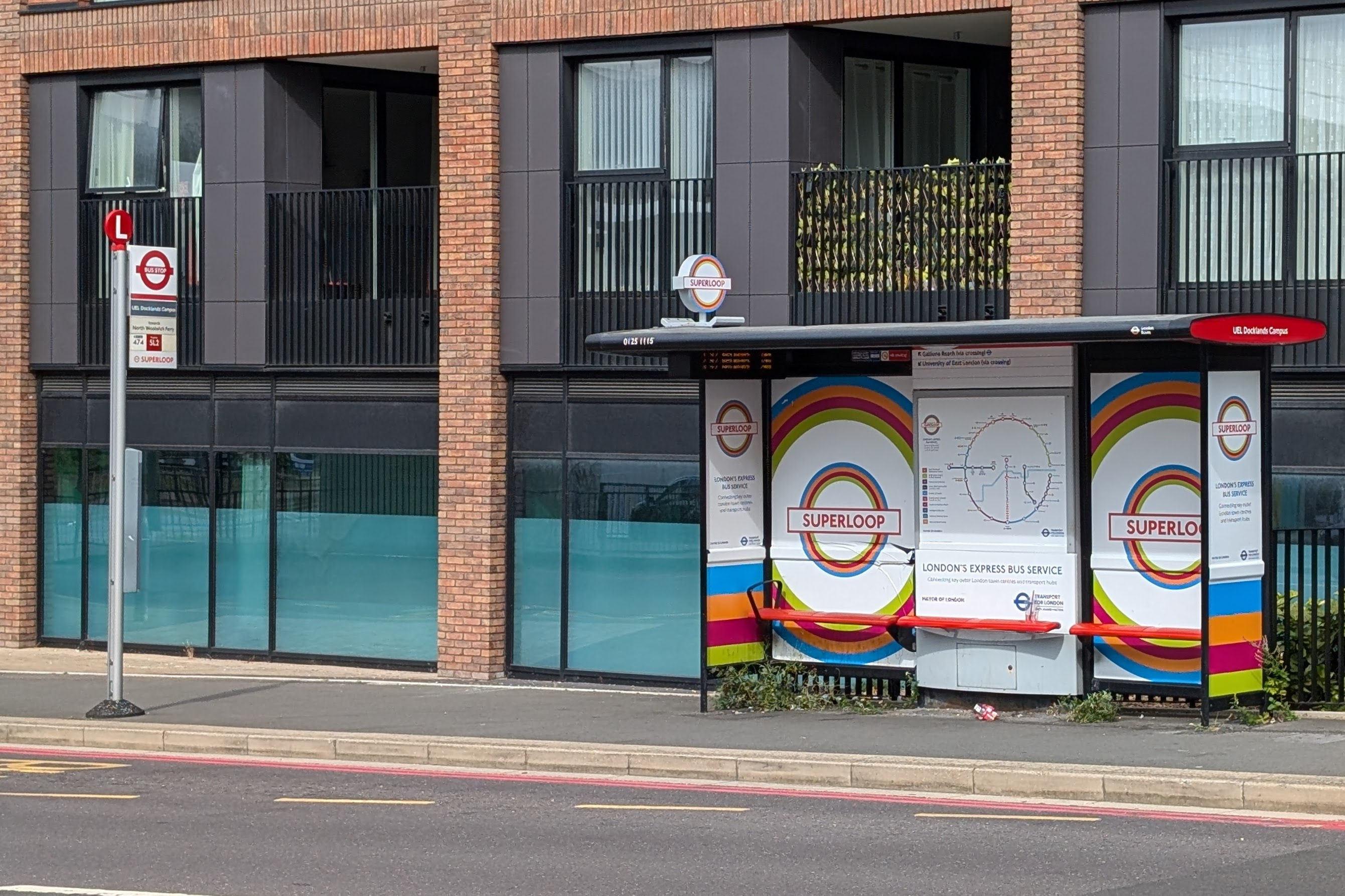
Superloop branded bus stop at the UEL Docklands Campus

London Buses route SL2 is a Transport for London contracted Superloop express bus route in London, England. Running between Walthamstow bus station and North Woolwich, it is operated by Arriva London.

== History ==
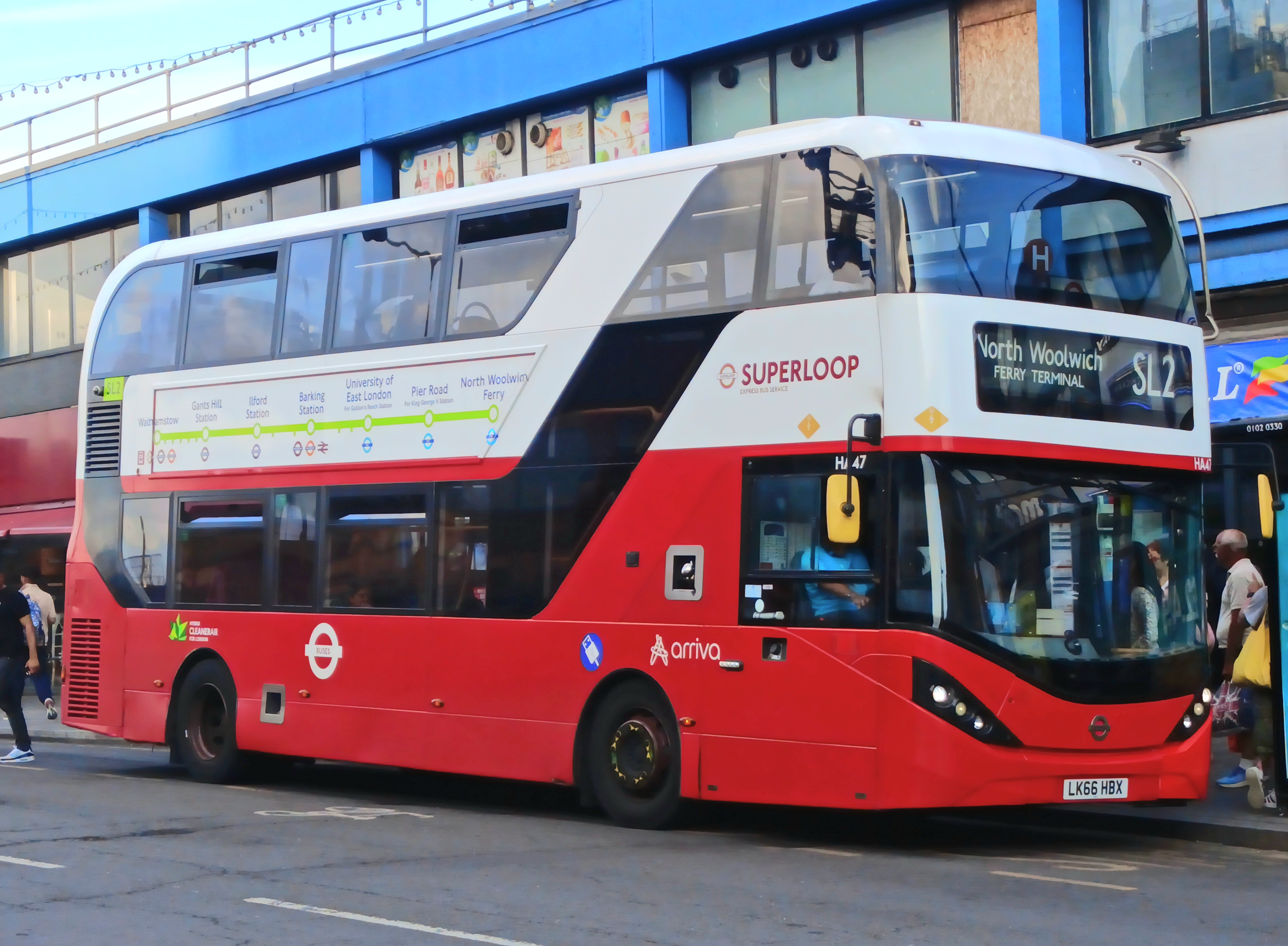
The route initially used Alexander Dennis Enviro400H Citys when it launched

On 21 July 2023, a consultation for route SL2 was opened by Transport for London, and closed on 4 September the same year. It was awarded on 20 October 2023, and was introduced on 2 March 2024, using existing Alexander Dennis Enviro400H Citys. It was initially operated by Arriva London from Barking garage.

On 18 July 2026, route SL2 was transferred to Tottenham garage. At the same time, the Alexander Dennis Enviro400H Citys were replaced with new BYD BD11Bs, converting the route to full electric bus operation.

== Current route ==
Route SL2 operates via these locations:

- Walthamstow bus station for Walthamstow Central station
- Walthamstow Market
- South Woodford
- Woodford
- Gants Hill station
- Ilford station
- Barking station
- UEL Docklands Campus
- North Woolwich Ferry Terminal

== Operation ==
The route operates at a frequency of a bus every 12 minutes on weekdays and Saturdays and a bus every 15 minutes on Sundays.

== Former route SL2 ==
From June 1996 until August 2002, a previous route SL2 ran in Central London, connecting the mainline railway stations at Paddington, Marylebone, Euston, St Pancras, King's Cross, Liverpool Street, Fenchurch Street, London Bridge, Waterloo and Victoria. The route was operated by Thorpes and branded as Stationlink, running an hourly (anticlockwise) circular service, with route SL1 operating in the reverse direction. Both were replaced by routes 205 and 705 respectively in August 2002.
