= KamAZ-6282 =

Russian bus

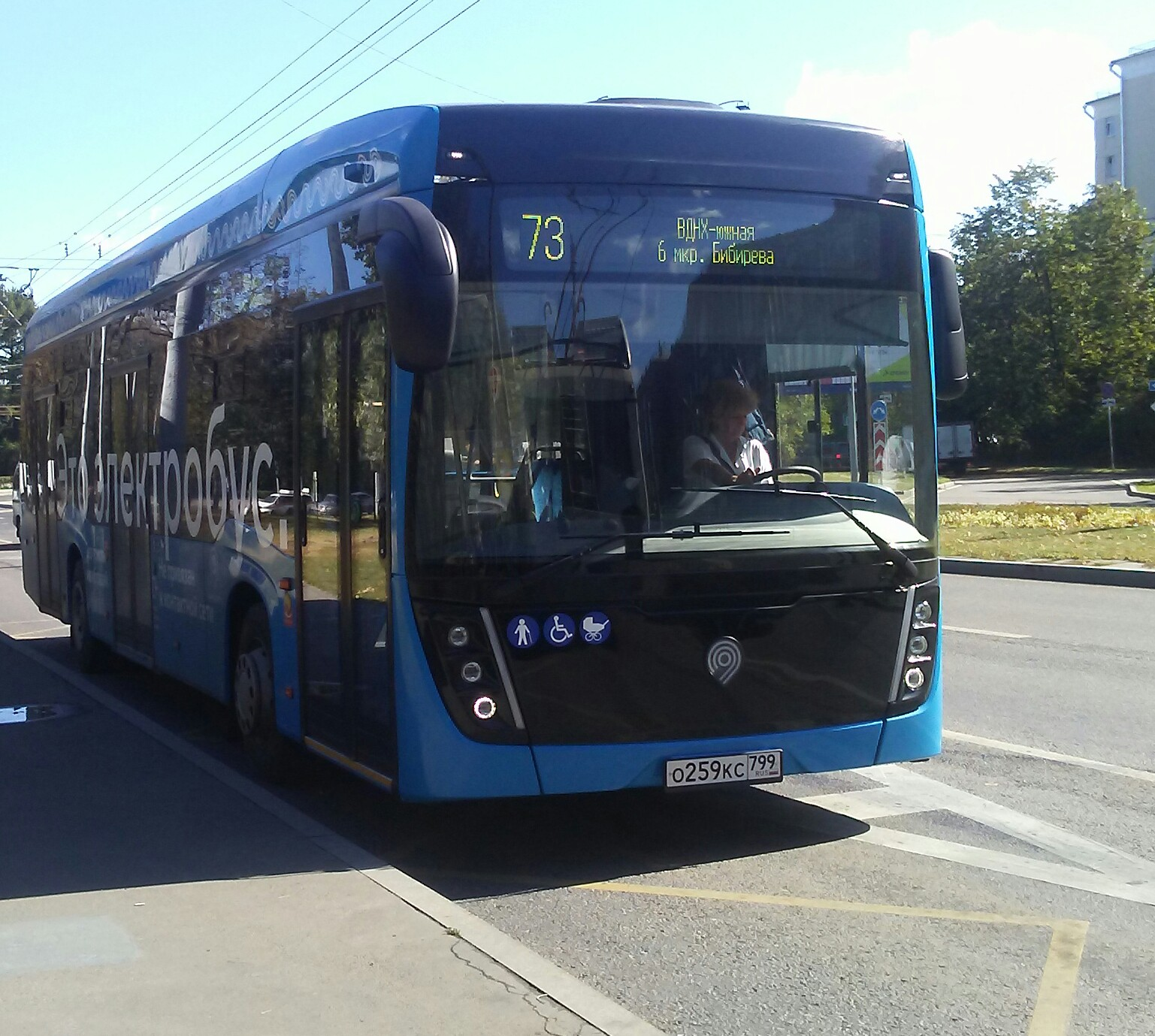
- KamAZ-6282 in Moscow, Russia

Overview
- Manufacturer: KamAZ
- Production: 2018–present
- Assembly: Naberezhnye Chelny, Russia

Body and chassis
- Class: Electric bus
- Doors: 3
- Floor type: Low-floor

Powertrain
- Capacity: 85 passengers

Dimensions
- Length: 12,400 mm (488.2 in)
- Width: 2,540 mm (100.0 in)
- Height: 3,260 mm (128.3 in)
- Curb weight: 18,000 kg (39,683 lb)

Postage stamp

KamAZ-6282 is the urban large class low-floor electric bus codeveloped by NefAZ and KamAZ. Mass production of this model began in 2018. More than 1,000 units produced. The bus has been commonly used as part of the rollout of electric buses in Moscow.

== Variants ==
=== KamAZ-6282-121 ===
Variant equipped with lithium-titanate batteries. During production, the model got restyled twice.

KamAZ-6282-121

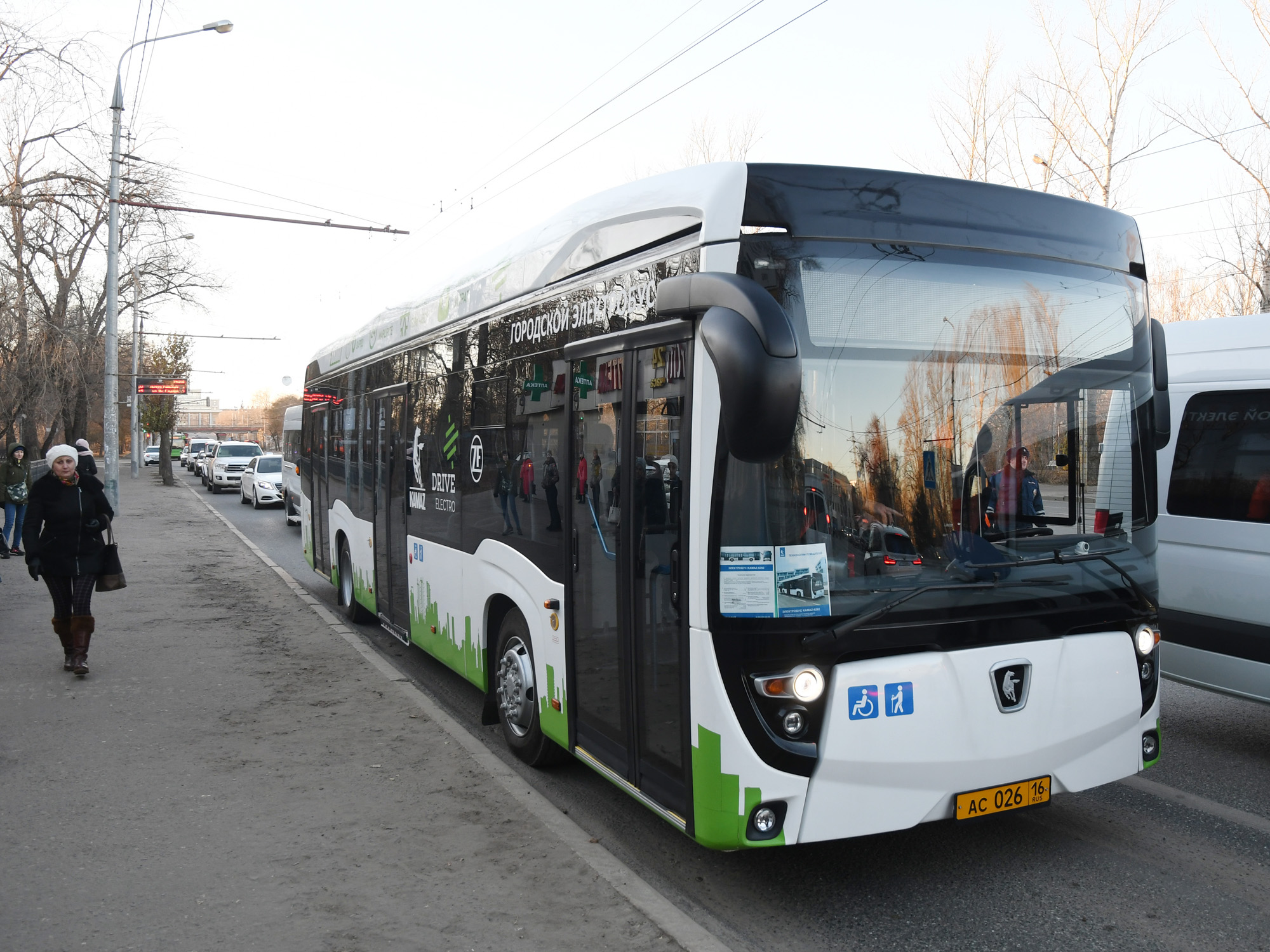
Initial design of KamAZ-6282. Photographed in 2018 in Kazan, Russia

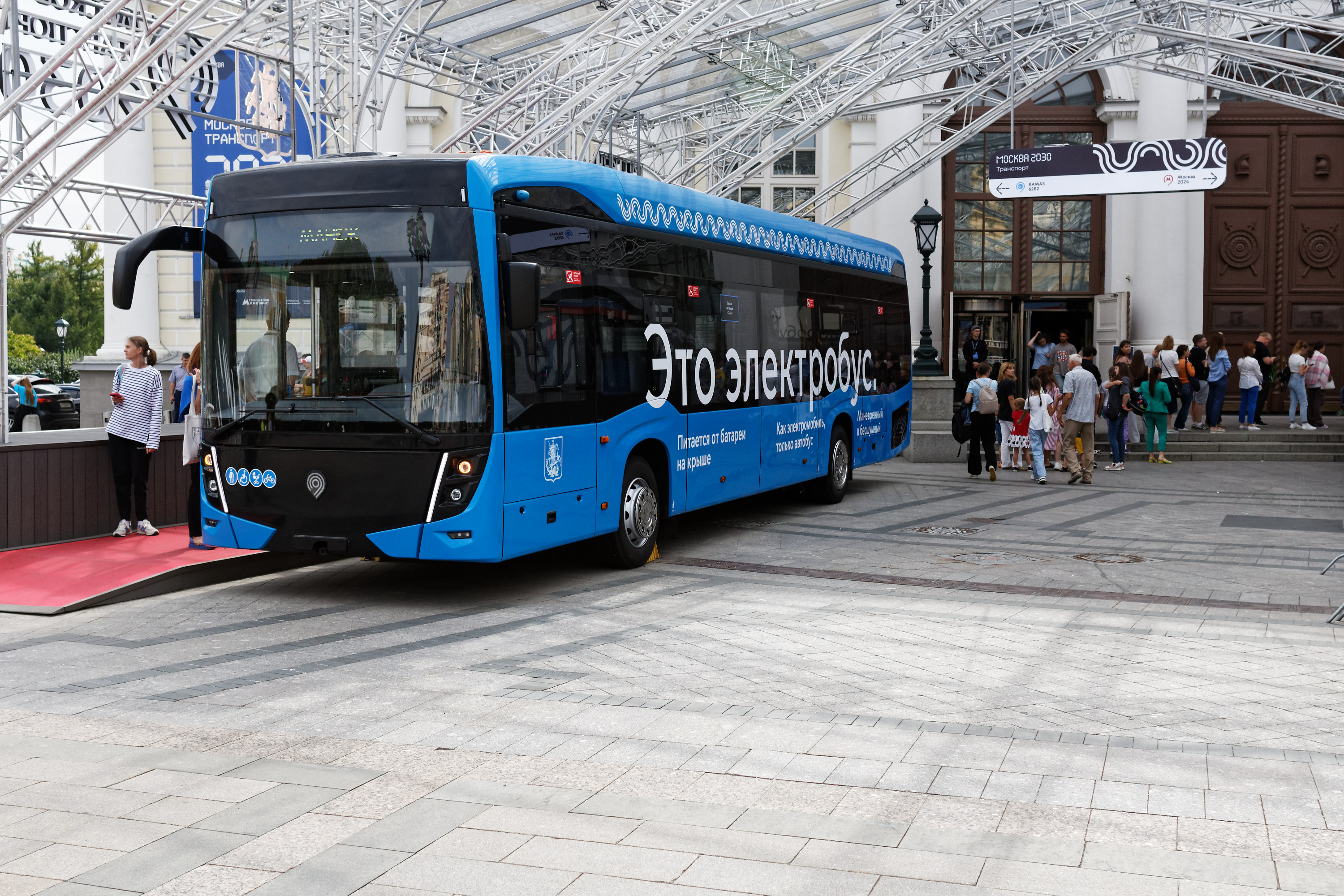
KamAZ-6282 in Moscow, 2024 redesign

=== KamAZ-6282-123 ===
Variant equipped with lithium-nickel-manganese-cobalt batteries.

KamAZ-6282-123 (also known as KamAZ-6282 ONC), displayed on ComTrans 2023 in Moscow, Russia<ref name=":2" />

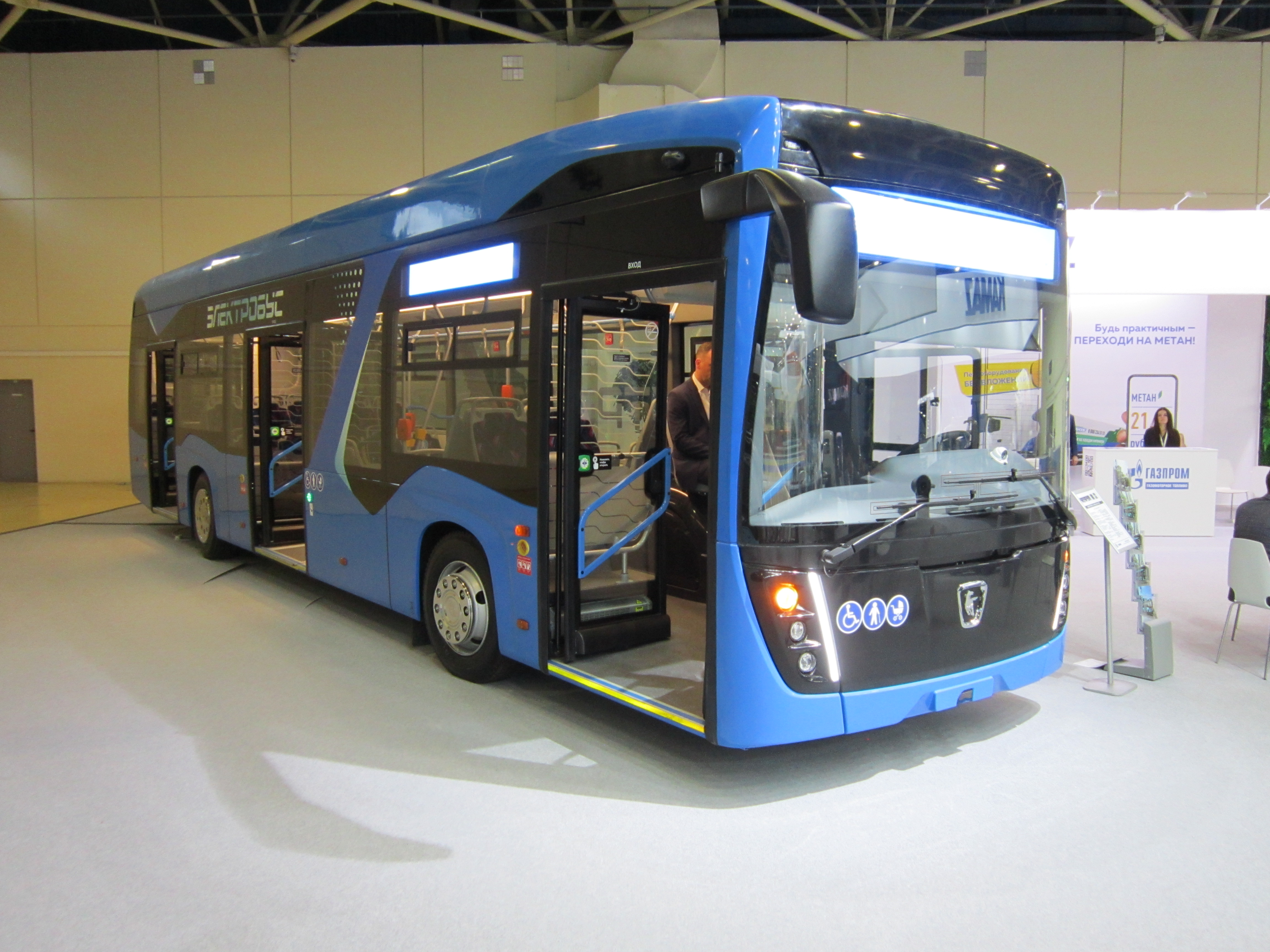
Front view

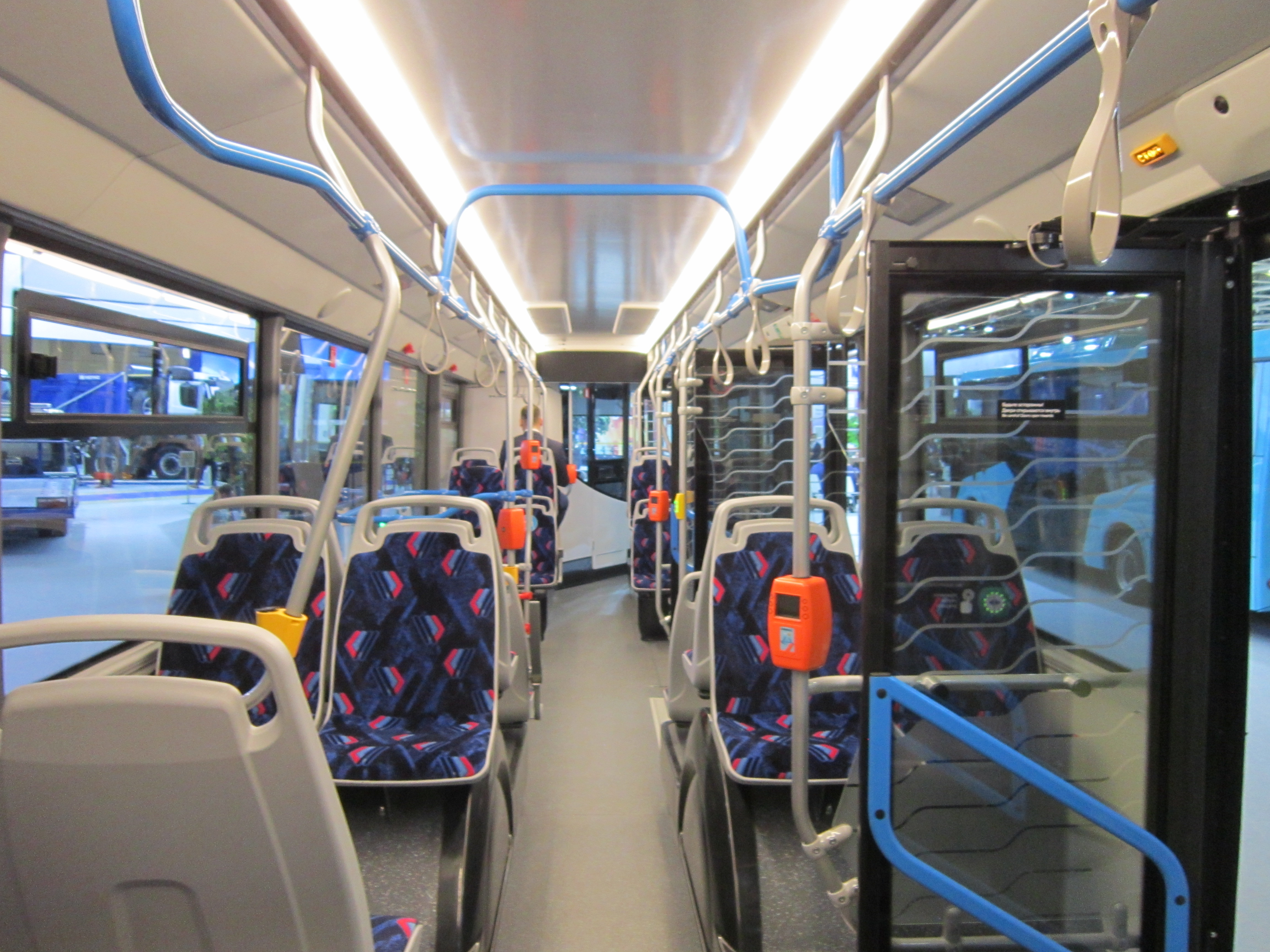
Bus interior, forward view

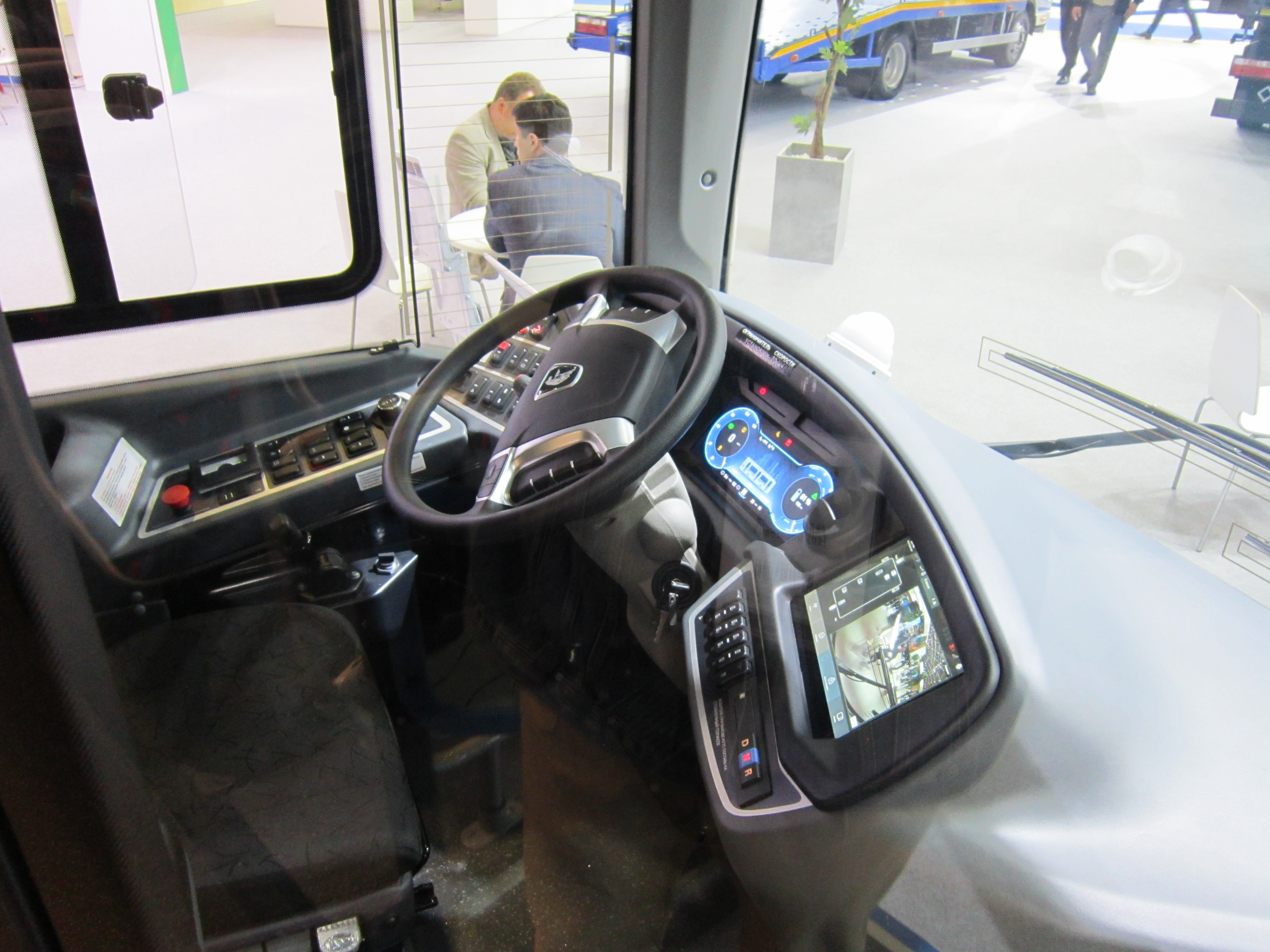
Driver's cabin

=== KamAZ-62825 ===
Trolleybus, with the ability to recharge from overhead trolleybus wires.

=== KamAZ-6290 ===
Variant powered by hydrogen fuel cells.

=== KamAZ-6292 ===
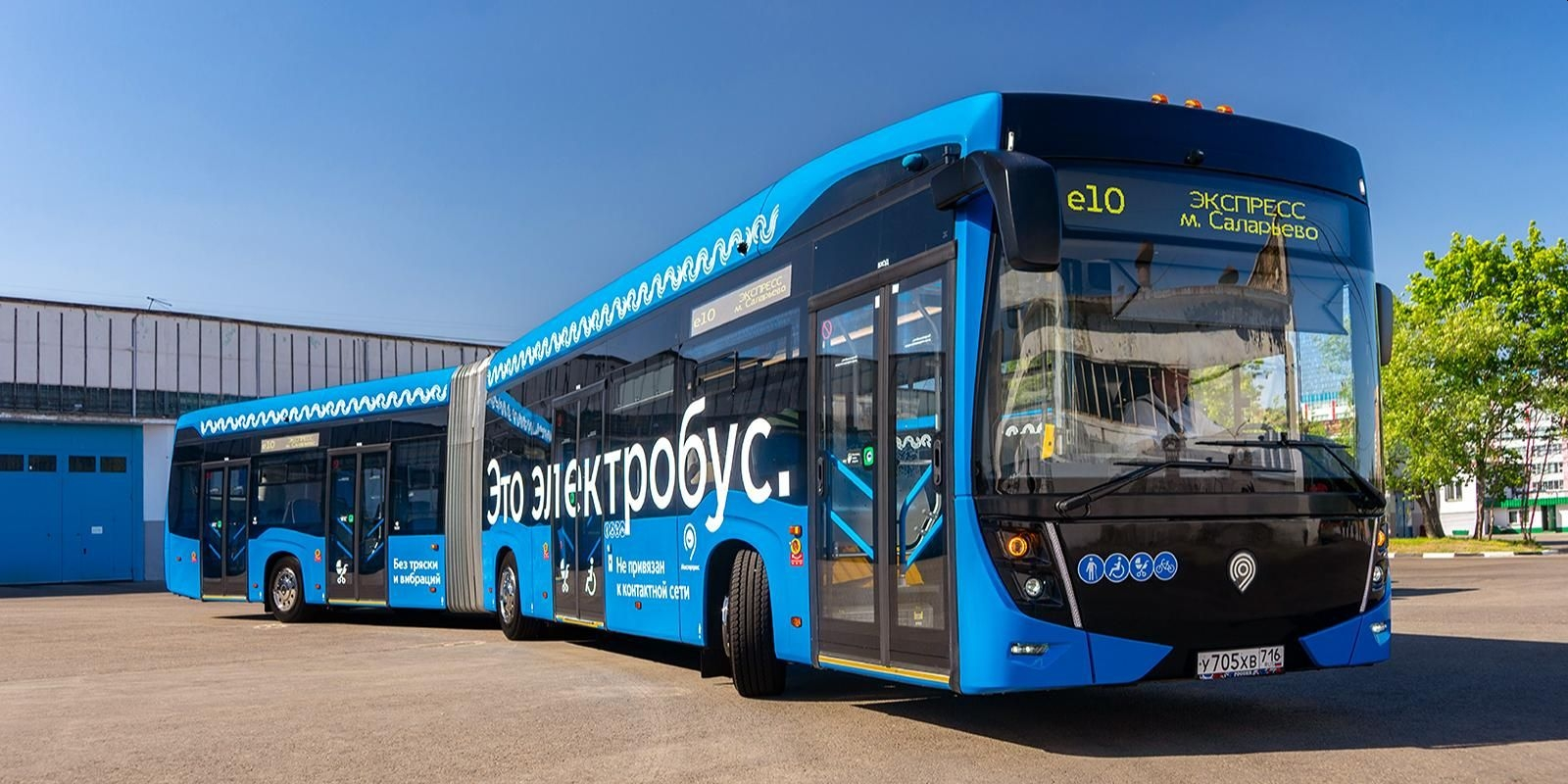
KamAZ-6292 in Moscow, Russia. Photographed in 2025

Extended articulated bus variant based on the KamAZ-6299.
