= Electric buses in Moscow =

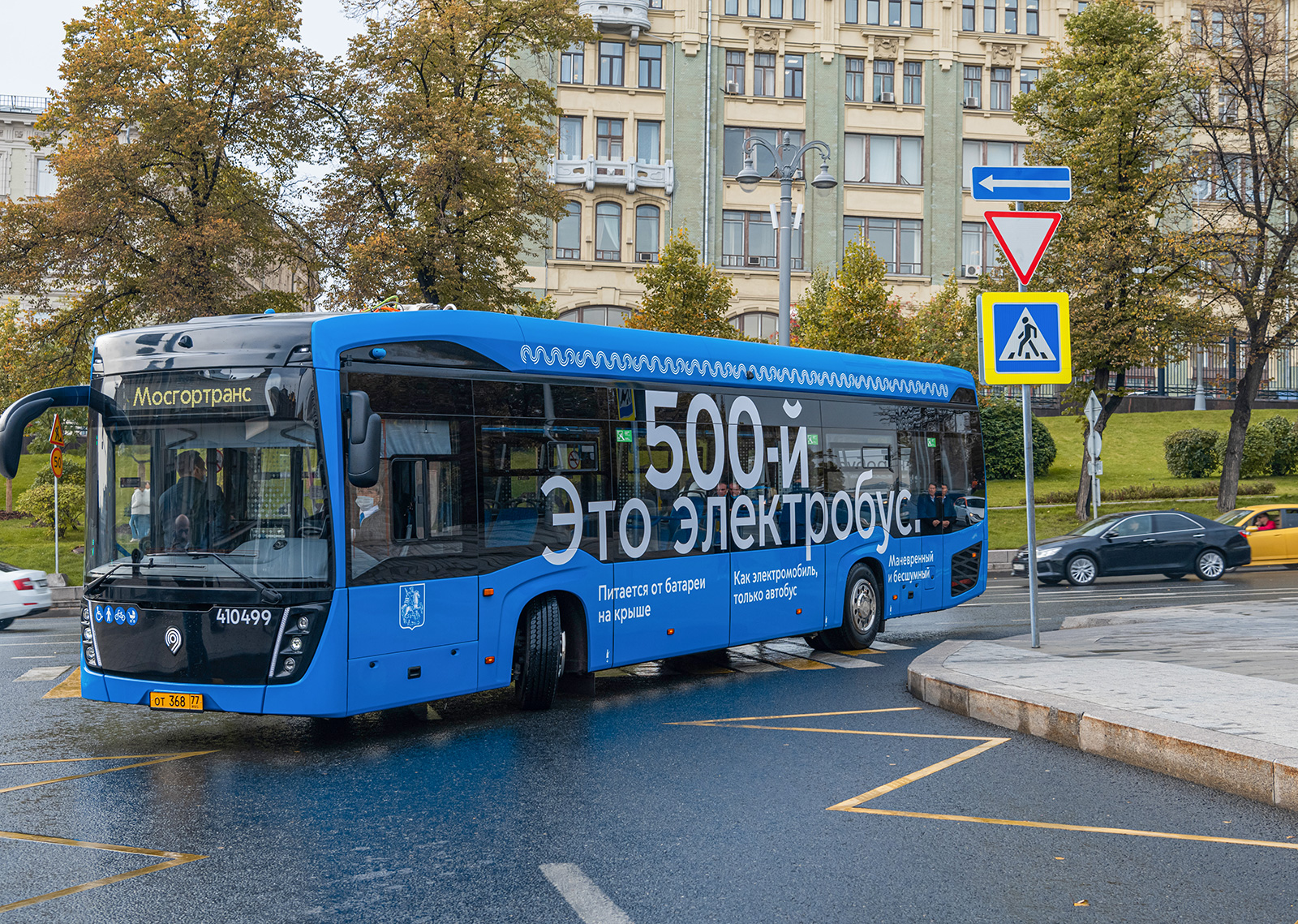
The 500th electric bus entered service in Moscow on 8 October 2020.

Mosgortrans operate the second largest electric bus fleet in Europe behind London's fleet. As of July 2026, there are over 3000 electric buses operating in Moscow. As of January 2024, they have carried over 400 million passengers. As of July 2024, electric buses serve over 130 routes. The fleet consists of around 1900 KAMAZ-6282 buses, around 470 LiAZ-6274 buses, around 350 KAMAZ-52222 buses and as well as electric minibuses.

== History ==
The first battery electric bus entered the streets of Moscow in the end of 2018. Under the terms of the contracts, in 2018–2019, domestic manufacturers GAZ and KAMAZ supplied 300 electric buses to Moscow. Another 700 electric buses were delivered to Moscow in 2020 and 2021. Thus, Moscow's electric bus fleet reached 1000, and became the largest in Europe, in just 3 years. A further 450 to 500 buses were expected to be delivered in 2022. Mosgortrans noted that the entire bus fleet would be zero-emission by 2030, with the use of electric and hydrogen fuel cell powered buses.

Most of the batteries and propulsion equipment for the Moscow electric buses are made by Drive Electro, which has manufactured and supplied components for 600 of the city's electric vehicles. Moscow plans to completely replace all its diesel and CNG buses with electric buses by 2030, and no more diesel buses will be ordered from 2021 onwards.

In 2022, it was announced that KAMAZ hydrogen fuel cell buses would be piloted in the city. In January 2023, Mayor of Moscow Sergey Sobyanin noted that around 1000 additional buses would be delivered by 2024. Between 2018 and 2023, the introduction of electric buses has reduced СО_{2} emissions by around 130,000 tons. By July 2024, over 1700 electric buses were in service on around 130 routes. By December 2025, there are over 2700 electric buses in service.

== Criticism ==
Even before the launch, the Moscow electric bus project was criticized by experts and passengers, including:

- High cost – the price of one electric bus ranges from 30 to 56 million rubles, which is 3-4 times more expensive than a trolleybus.
- Wasting time on charging – electric buses take time to charge (compared to filling with diesel fuel). Buses spend between 8 and 20 minutes at the terminal station to charge the battery, the time in which it could carry passengers. As a result, more buses and drivers are required to ensure a similar output than trolleybuses and diesel buses.
- The use of an auxiliary diesel heater of the heating system. Mosgortrans specialists claim that the heater is used only at temperatures below 5 °C.
- Linking to charging stations and the inability to change the endpoints of the route. Representatives of the Moscow Department of Transport noted that switching to an electric bus is convenient because it is not connected to a contact network, which makes it possible to change routes and run them along streets where there are no wires. However, attachment to charging stations makes it impossible to quickly extend the route by several stops (transfer of charging infrastructure is required) or shorten the route in case of any road works.
- The fragility of batteries, as well as the lack of current technology for their disposal.
- Susceptibility to low temperatures. In case of severe cold weather, there are massive absences of electric buses on the line.

Certain serious complaints are also caused by the compliance of this type of transport with the current fire safety requirements, since the electric bus uses electrochemical elements as traction, which are placed along the main part of the roof and occupy up to half of the free space. To date, no fatal accidents have been recorded in the world among passengers of this type of transport, but serious fires ave occurred with passenger cars. One of the first accidents involving an electric bus in Moscow occurred in July 2019 on Budyonny Avenue, as a result of which 12 people were injured from a collision with a passenger car and a tram. It is noted that any impact on batteries, as a rule, negatively affects their remaining service life in the future, and the potential use of extremely worn or damaged battery cells can carry fatal risks of their depressurization with subsequent detonation of all elements on the roof.

Supporters of the preservation of the Moscow trolleybus believe that the introduction of electric buses has one goal — to cover the elimination of the trolleybus. This version is supported by the fact that most of the existing electric bus routes (12 out of 21) were trolleybus routes in the past, and also the fact that the project was seriously discussed only after public outrage over the replacement of trolleybus routes with bus routes.

Experts also believe that switching to trolleybuses is impractical both from a technical and economic point of view, and the choice of charging type is not optimal for Moscow. Calculations by experts have repeatedly shown that using electric buses on routes with an existing contact network is unprofitable and inefficient. The subsequent proposed mass replacement of buses with an internal combustion engine by electric buses, as the latter's service life is exhausted, may further affect the existence of the route network in an established form and lead to a reduction in a number of important directions, which will be compensated only by combining some routes with others or by radically changing the entire route network within the district with linking to terminal transport hubs near metro stations.

At the same time, the Department of Transport has not been able to provide any economic justification for the effectiveness of electric buses with ultrafast charging compared to trolleybuses with increased autonomous travel. The only presentation of the project from 2017 contains figures in which the final maintenance of electric buses is cheaper by 10 %. However, detailed calculations confirming the reliability of these indicators are not presented in the presentation. Moreover, in December 2019, the Baza publication published a letter from Maxim Liksutov to the Ministry of Transport, in which the Department of Transport recognizes that operating an ultrafast electric bus is more expensive than a bus or trolleybus by about one million rubles per year.

Since the launch of the project, the Department of Transport has repeatedly reported on its success.

On December 26, 2019, a round table on the topic "Prospects for the development of electric buses and the danger of eliminating trolleybuses" was held in the Moscow City Duma by Daria Besedina, a deputy from the Yabloko Party, at which the participants, which included manufacturers of electric vehicles, representatives of operating enterprises, and transport experts, recognized the inefficiency of the chosen technology for charging electric buses for Moscow. Representatives of the Department of Transport did not attend the event.

== Gallery ==
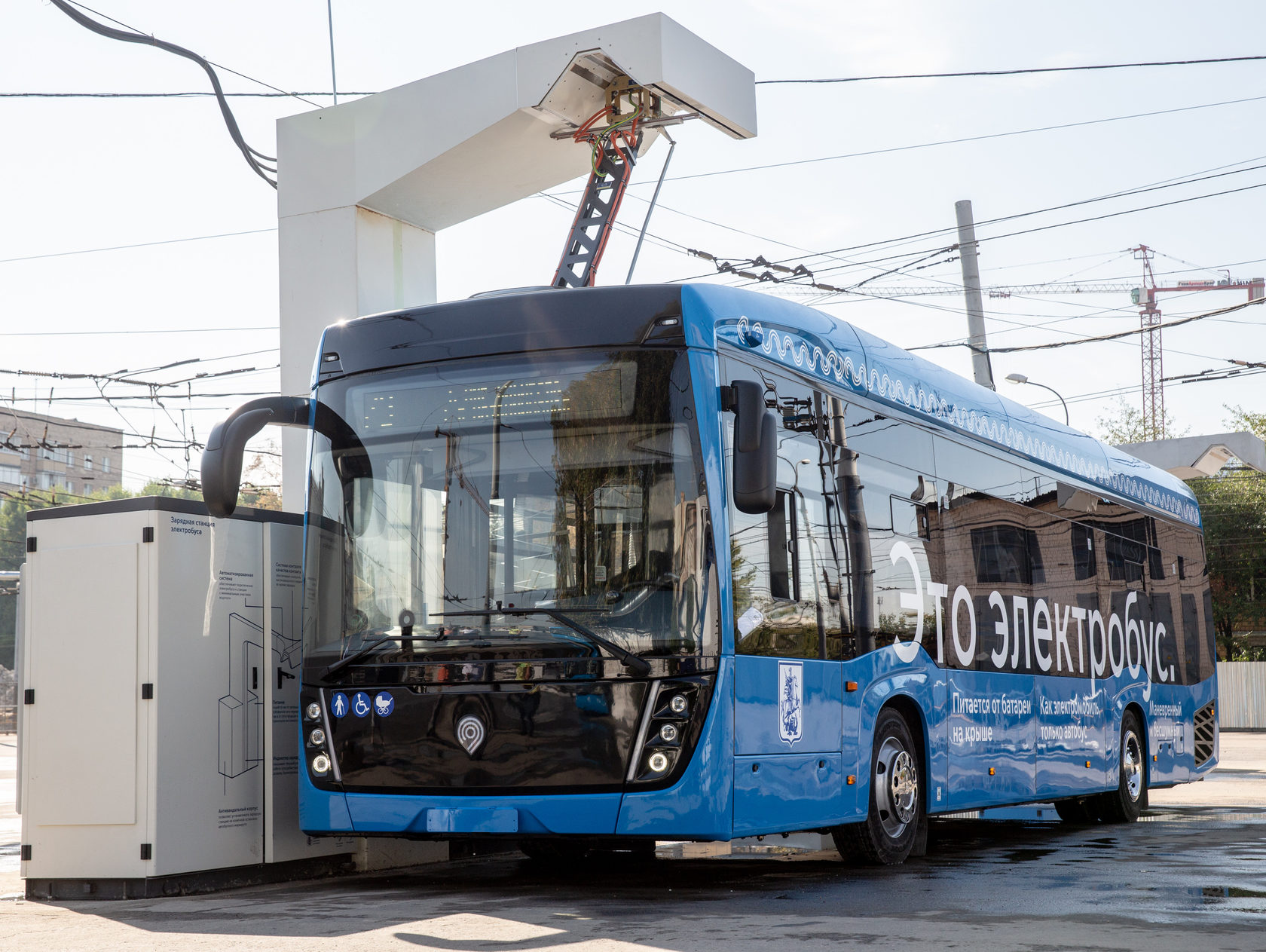
Electric buses replenish their energy reserves within 6 to 10 minutes using ultra-fast charging stations at terminal stops.

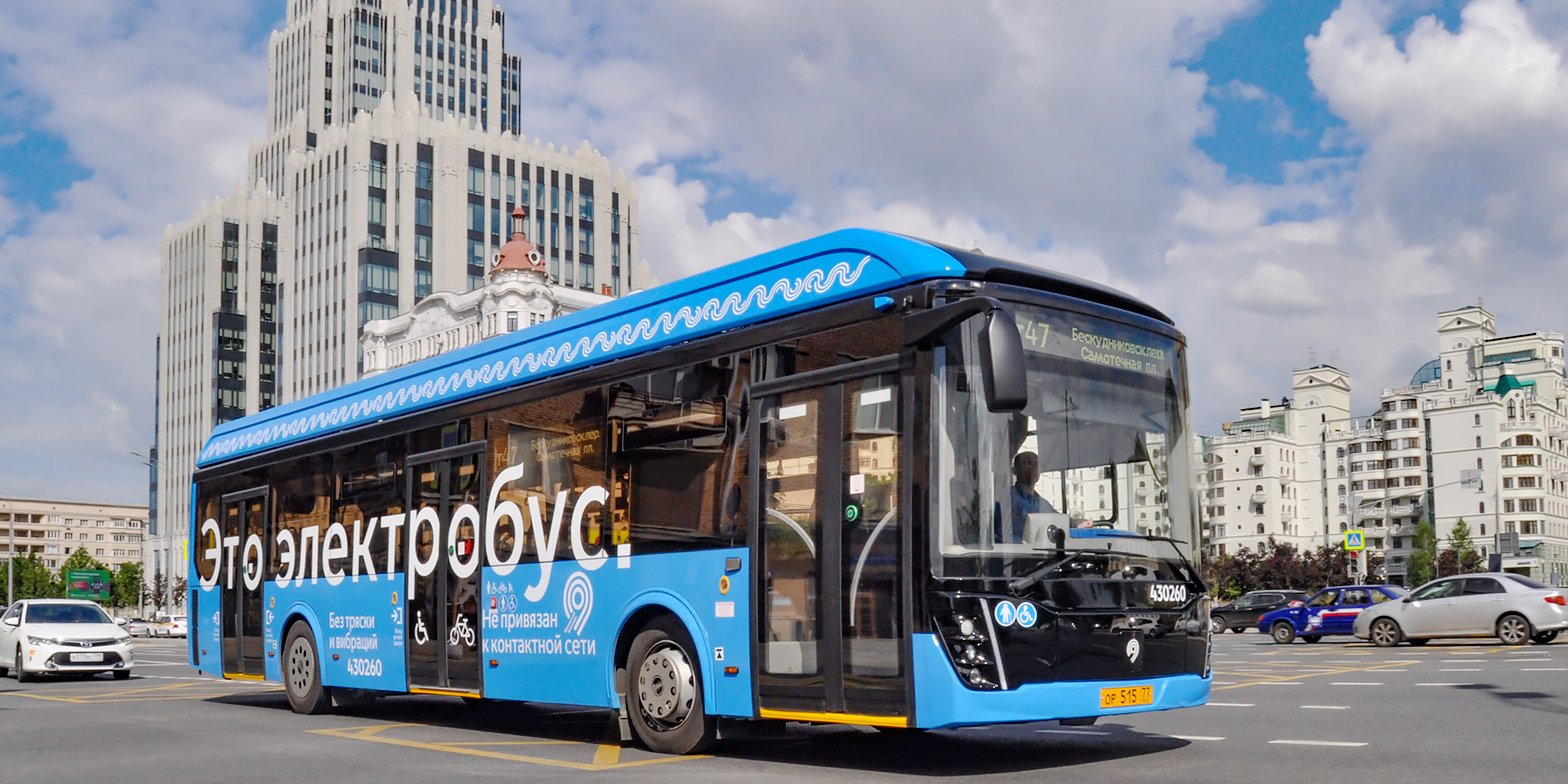
LiAZ-6274 operating on route T47

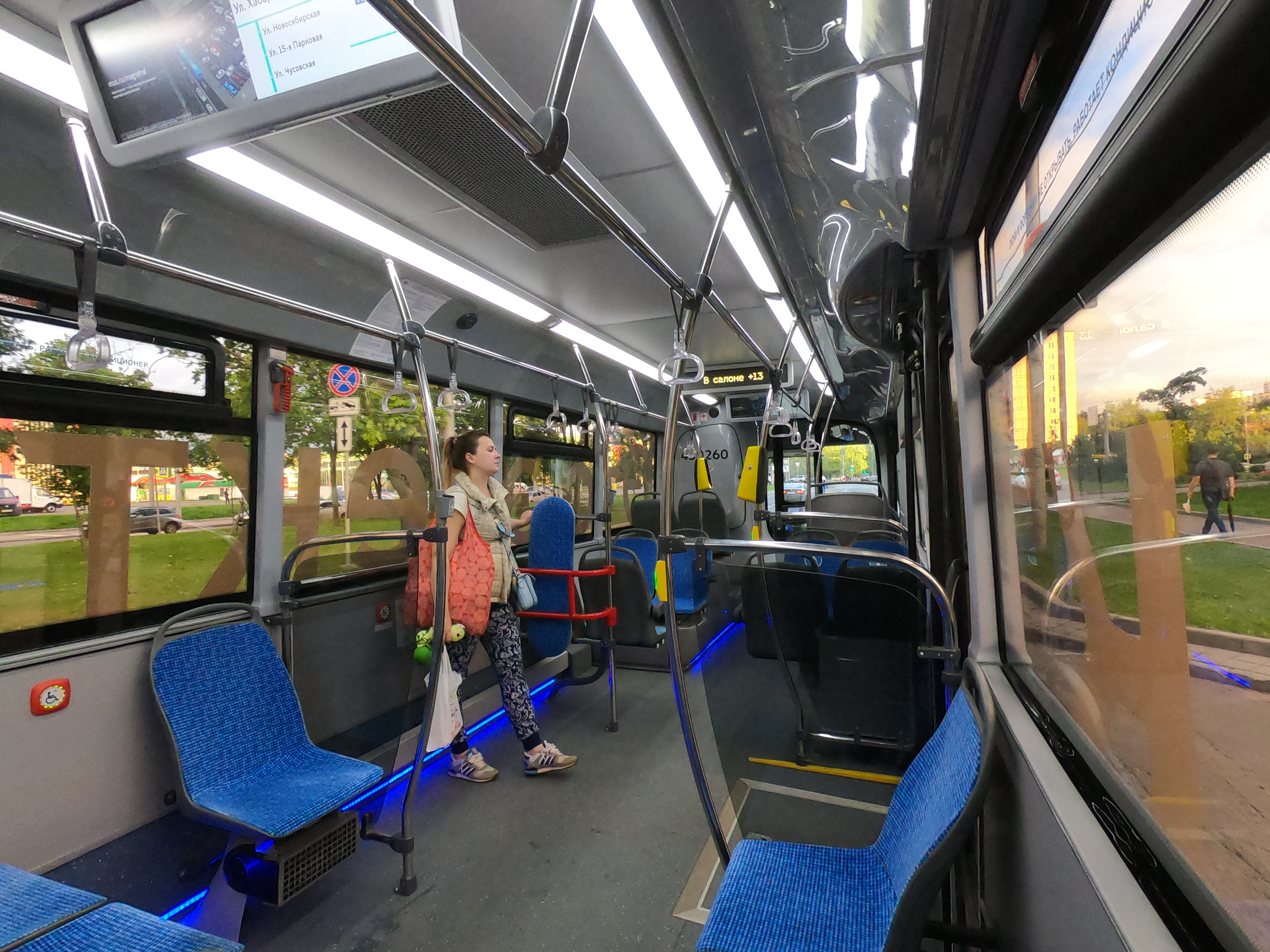
LiAZ-6274 interior

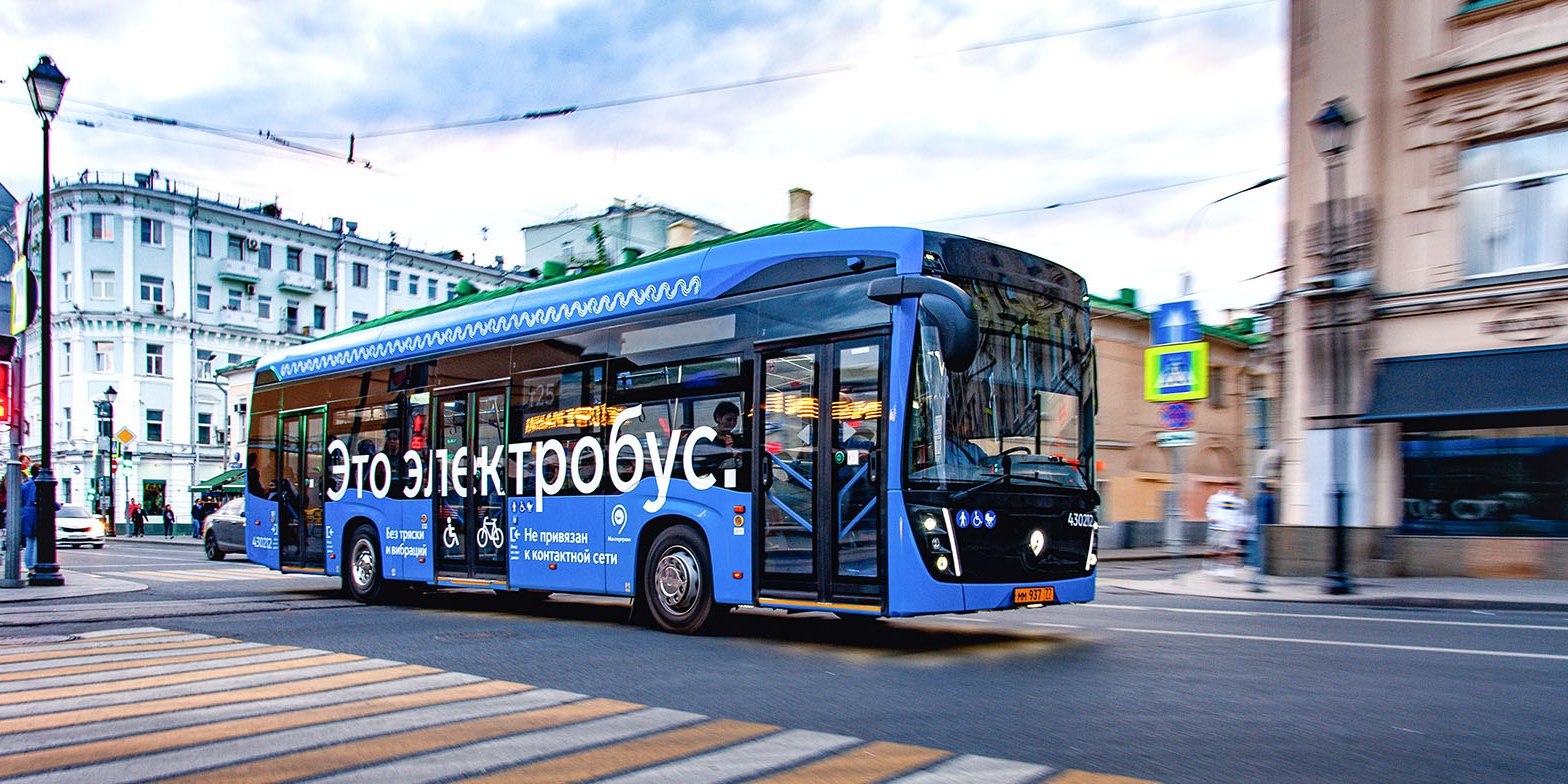
KAMAZ-6282 operating on route T25

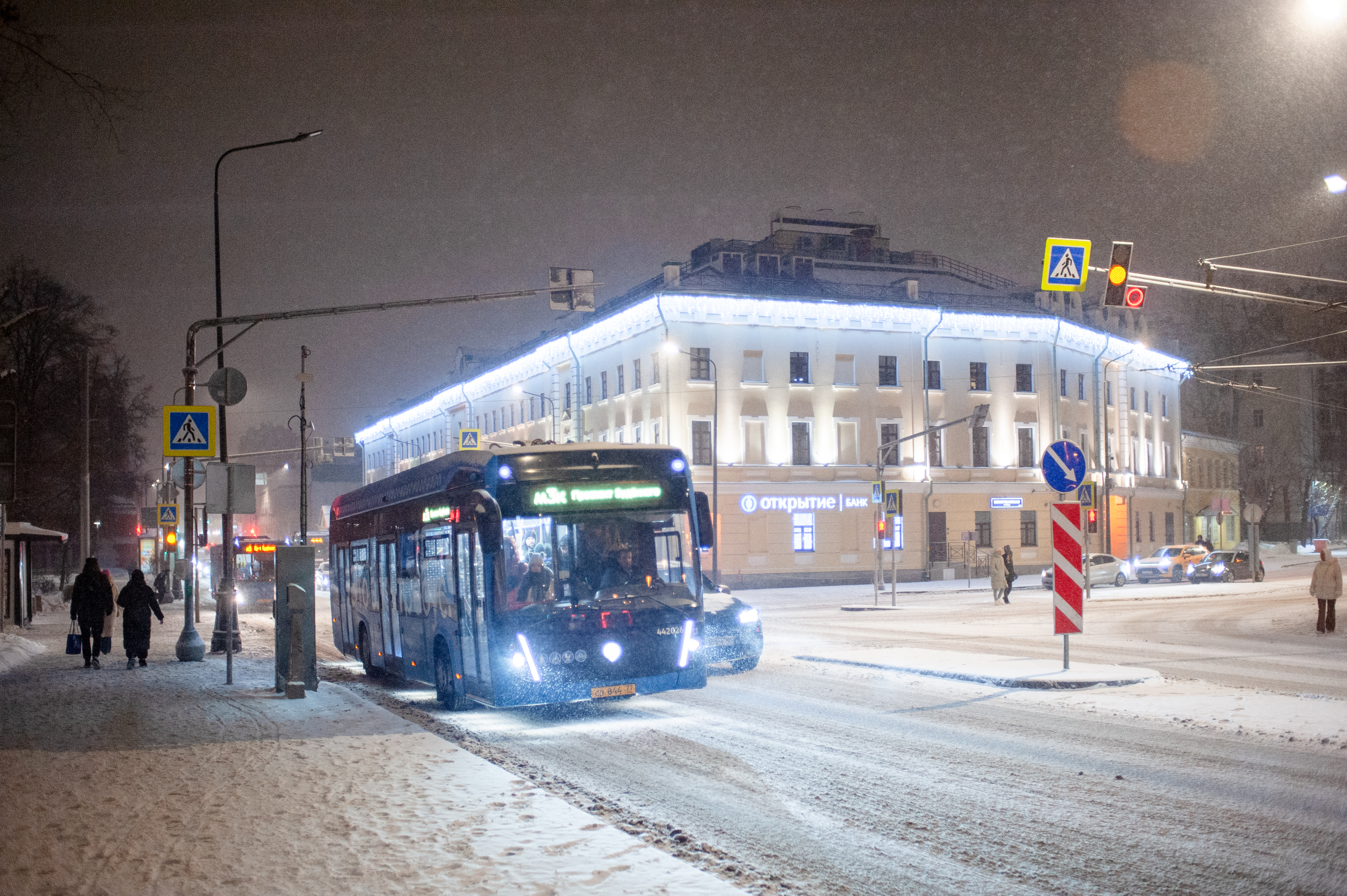
KAMAZ-6282 in the winter night

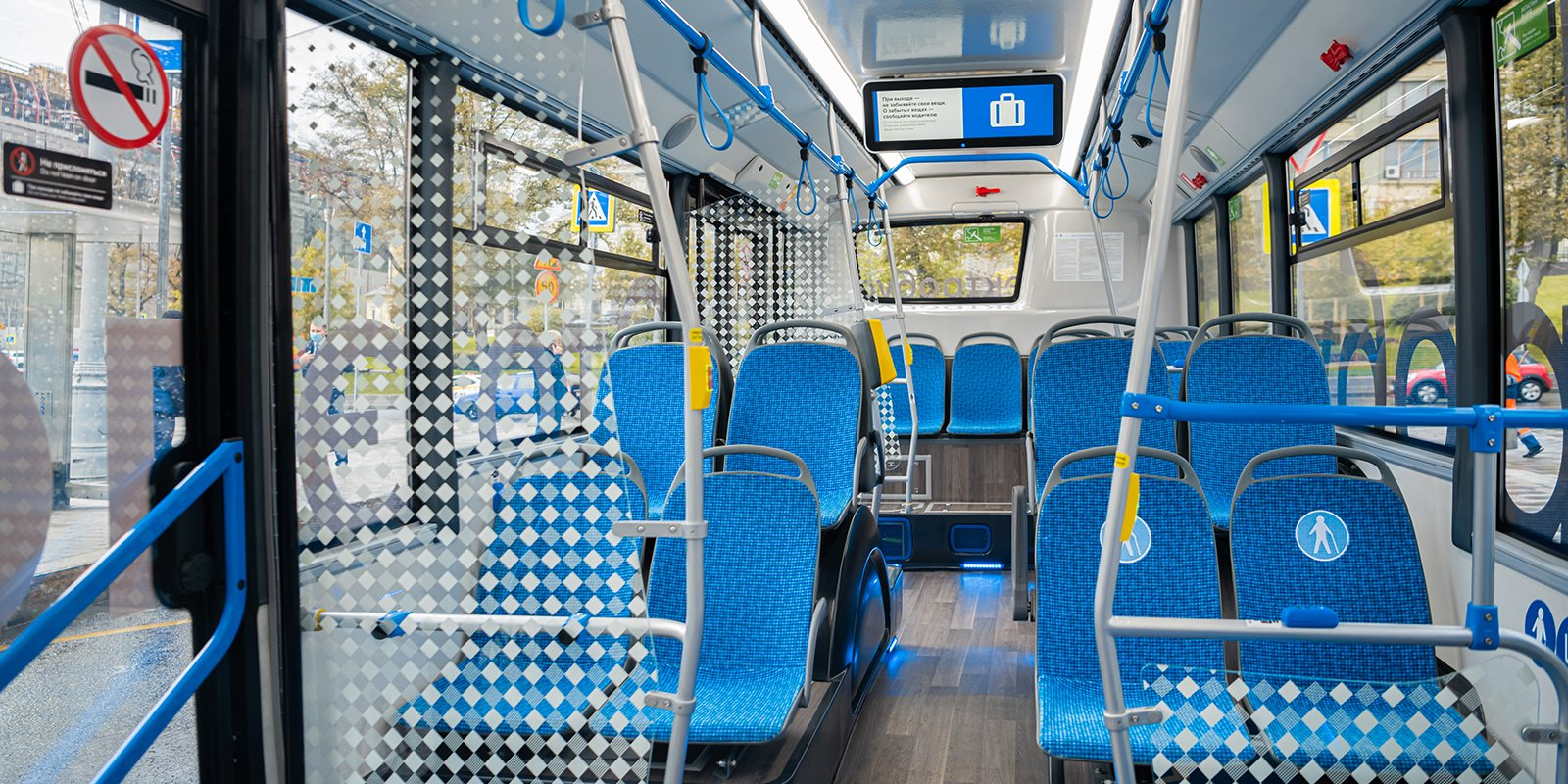
KAMAZ-6282 interior

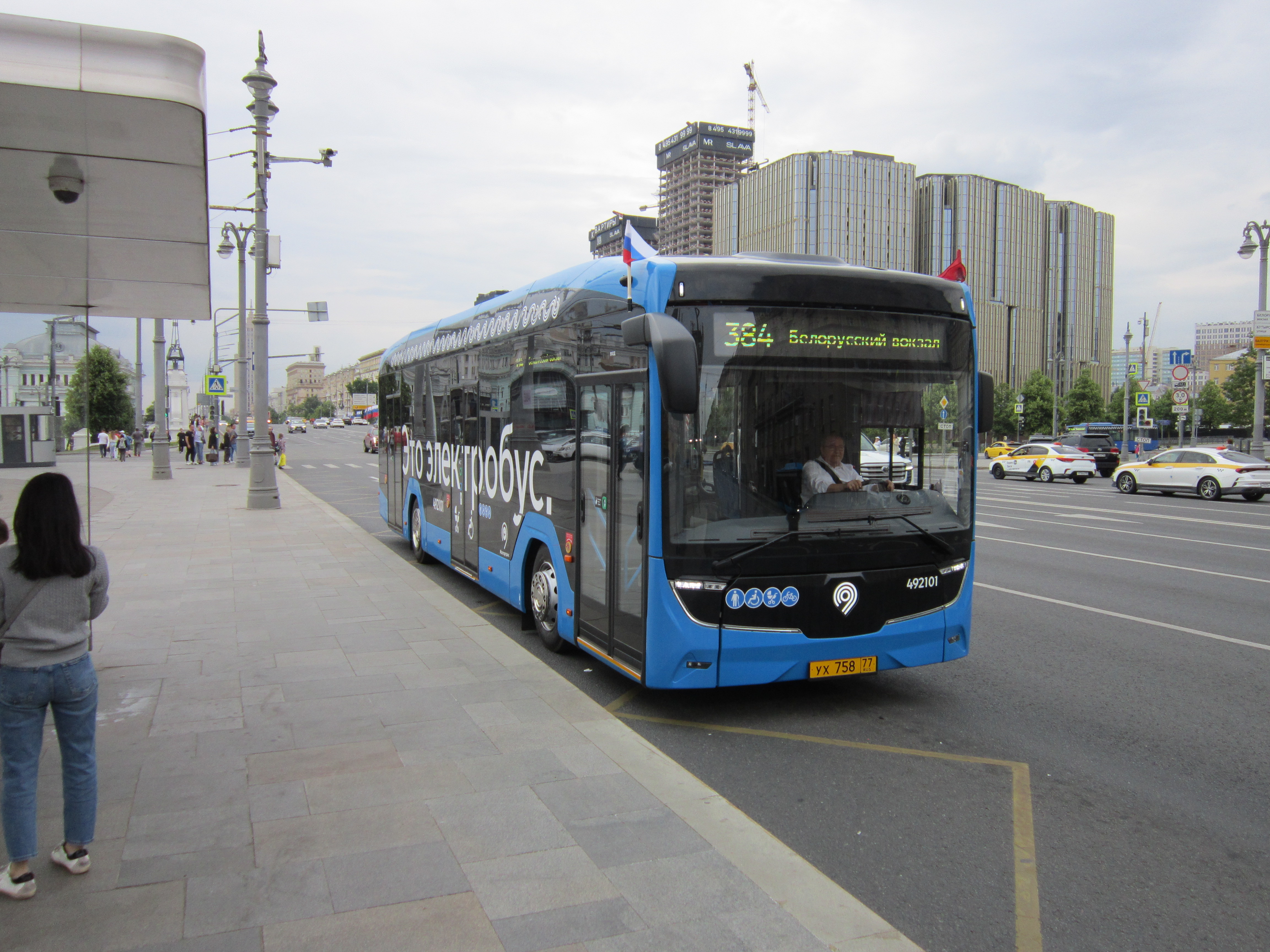
KAMAZ-52222

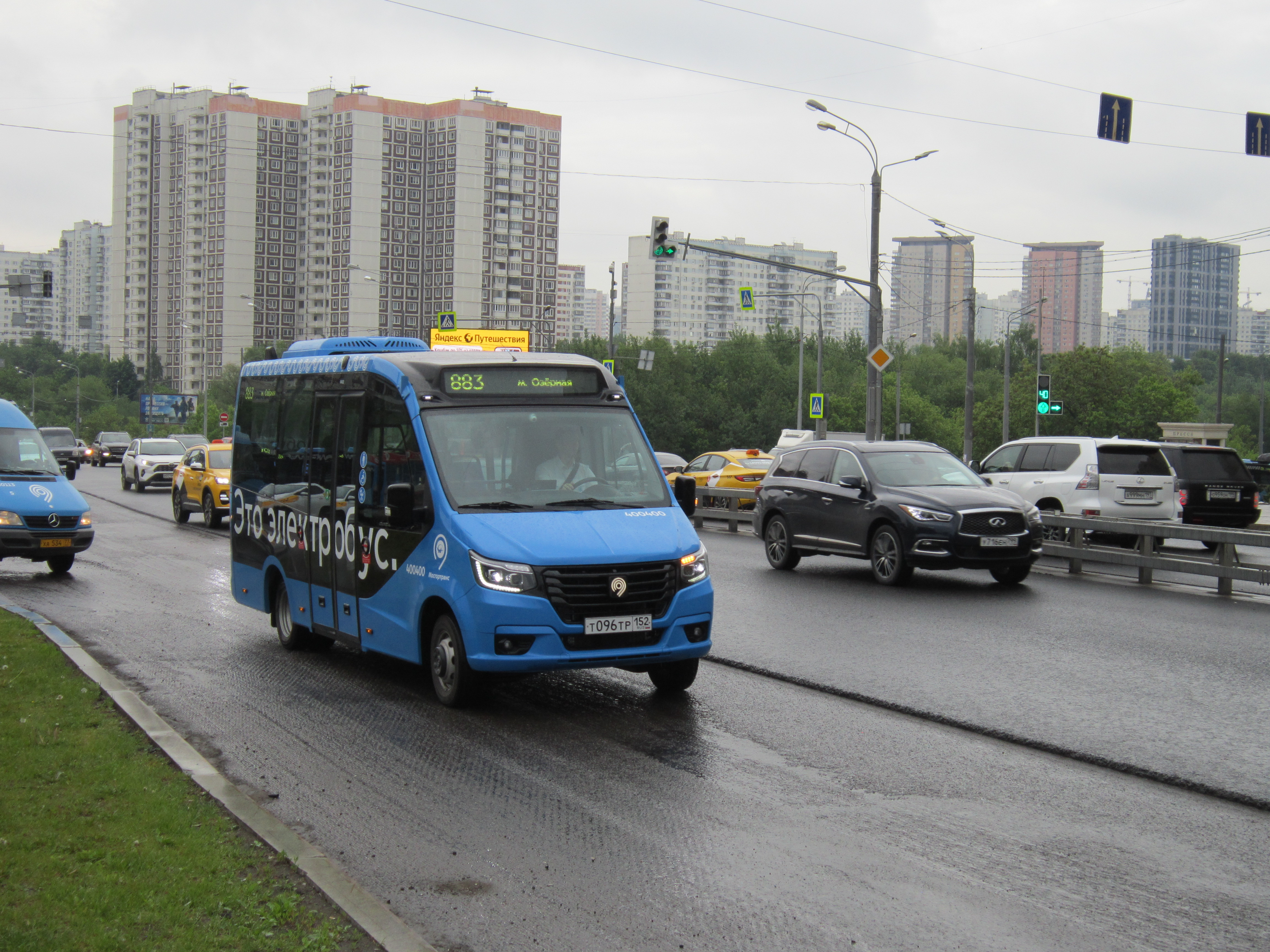
Minibus GAZ e-City

== Comparison ==
- As of June 2025, Paris has around 1100 zero emission buses, 1300 hybrid buses and 2500 biomethane buses in service.
- As of June 2025, London has around 3700 hybrid buses, 2000 battery electric buses, and 20 hydrogen fuel cell buses in service.
- As of May 2025, New York City has around 960 hybrid buses, 730 compressed natural gas (CNG) buses and 15 battery electric buses in service.
- As of March 2025, New Delhi has around 3190 CNG buses and 1250 electric buses in service.
- As of March 2025, Los Angeles has around 2000 CNG and 50 battery electric buses in service.

== See also ==
- Low-emission buses in London
- Low-emission buses in New York City
