= Mosgortrans =

State-owned bus company in Moscow, Russia

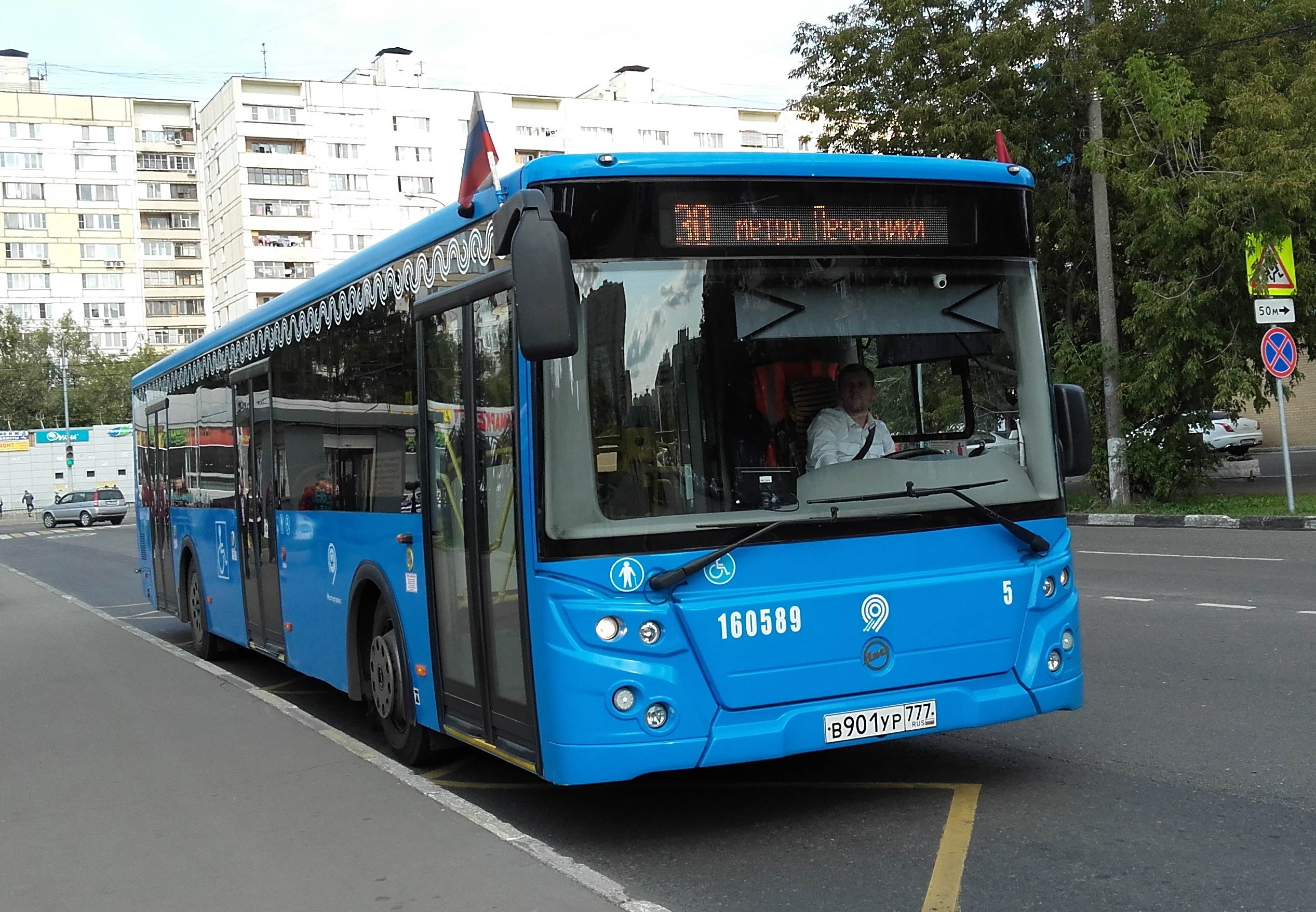
- Mosgortrans LiAZ-5292 in September 2017
- Type: State unitary enterprise
- Industry: Public transportation
- Founded: 1958
- Headquarters: Moscow, Russia
- Key people: Nikolay Asaul (General Director)
- Revenue: $768 million (2017)
- Operating income: −$253 million (2017)
- Net income: −$106 million (2017)
- Total assets: $1.83 billion (2017)
- Total equity: $1.09 billion (2017)
- Parent: Moscow Government
- Website: www.mosgortrans.ru

Mosgortrans (Russian: Мосгортранс) is a state-owned company that operates bus and electric bus networks in Moscow and the Moscow Oblast. The company operates the largest fleet of electric buses in Europe, surpassing London's fleet.

== History ==
The history of the State Unitary Enterprise Mosgortrans dates back to 31 July 1958. On that day, by decision of the Moscow City Executive Committee, the Passenger Transport Department (UPTM) was formed through the merger of the Tram and Trolleybus Department and the Passenger Motor Transport Department. This consolidated all three main types of surface public transport in Moscow — buses, trolleybuses, and trams — into a single production and technological complex. The newly established company, the predecessor of today's State Unitary Enterprise Mosgortrans, became Russia's largest operator of urban passenger transport.

The company inherited the Order of the Red Banner of Labour, awarded on 6 September 1947 to one of its predecessors, the Moscow Tram Administration, "for achievements in the restoration and development of the tram industry and in connection with the 800th anniversary of Moscow".

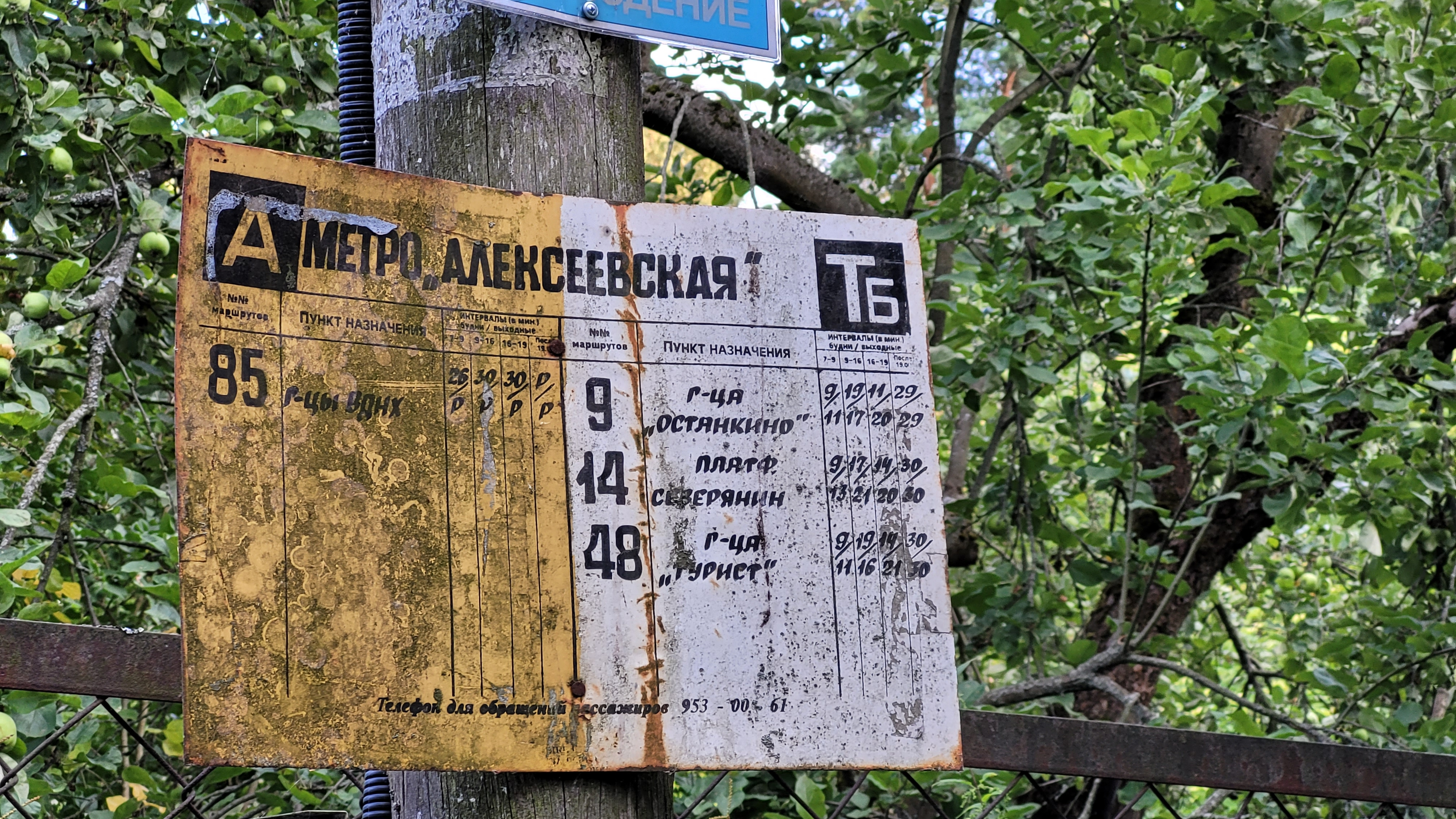
Mosgortrans bus stop sign from the 1990s

In 1960, the annual passenger volume of UPTM was 2.669 billion, accounting for 72.6% of the city's total passenger transport. Its fleet comprised 5,800 vehicles, including 1,776 trams, 1,360 trolleybuses, and 2,665 buses. At the time, UPTM included eight tram depots, four trolleybus depots, seven bus depots, a track service, a traffic service, a traction substation service, four repair plants (SVARZ, a trolleybus repair plant, an electromechanical tool factory, and a thermal switch plant), and other divisions.

In the early 1990s, Mosgortrans, like many other Russian transport companies, experienced severe financial difficulties. Due to insufficient funding, the quality of public transport services declined sharply. Revenue also decreased because of the high number of beneficiaries entitled to free travel and fare evasion. By the late 1990s, the company began to recover. Conductors were introduced on busy routes to control fares, and programmes were developed for the purchase and modernisation of rolling stock.

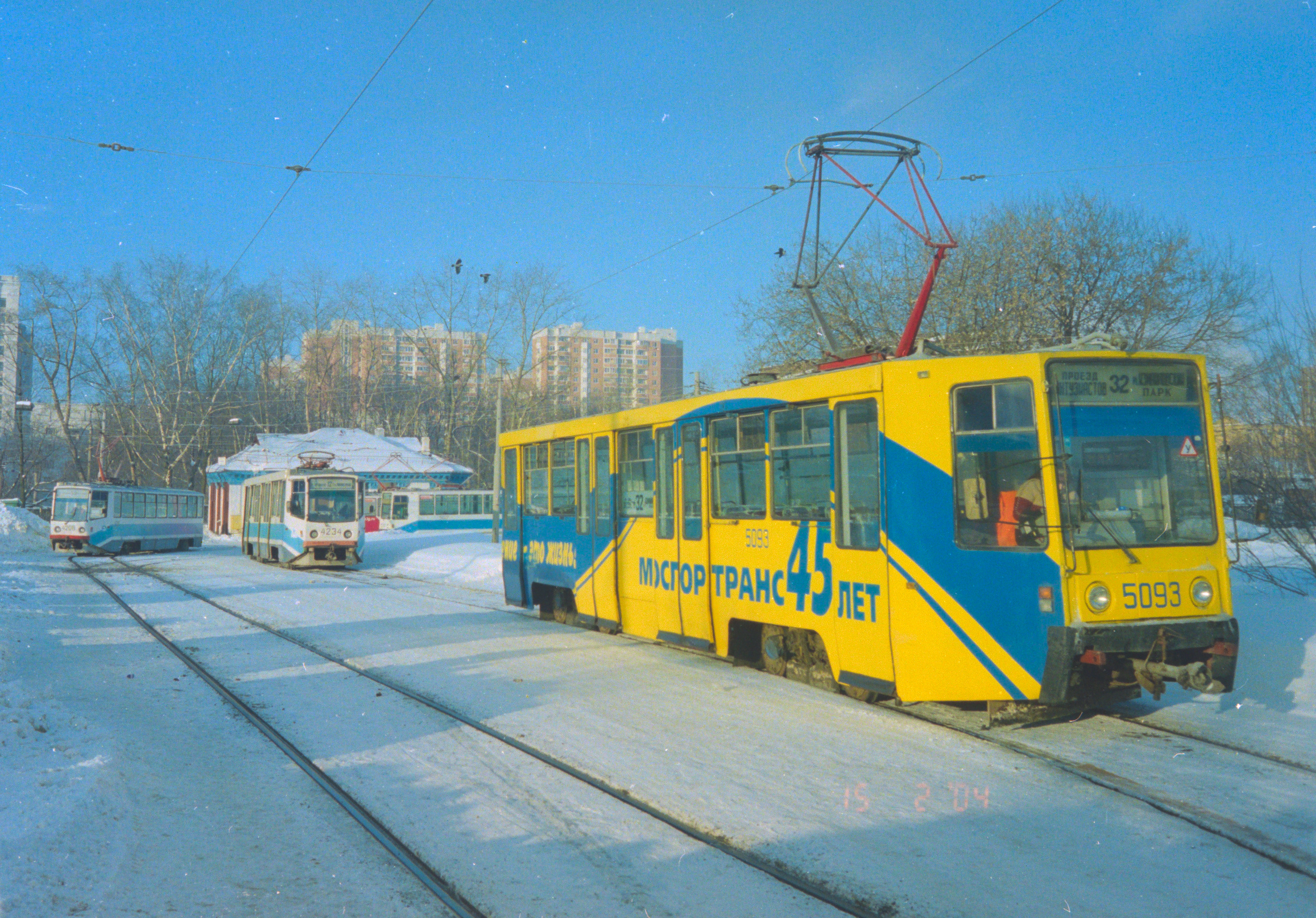
71-608K tram in commemorative livery "45 years of Mosgortrans", 2004

In 2003, Mosgortrans began the transition to an automated fare collection system (ASCS).

On 28 December 2009, Mosgortrans began operating its own minibuses using the Fiat Ducato. After their decommissioning, from 2017 onwards, Mercedes-Benz Sprinter minibuses were introduced.

In 2010, the State Unitary Enterprise Mosgortrans transported 1.637 billion passengers, including 1.045 billion by bus.

In May 2016, Mosgortrans began transferring some routes to private transport operators, while maintaining all public transport concessions and ticketing systems.

In October 2016, a unified network of free Wi-Fi across public surface transport and the Moscow Metro was introduced.

In October 2017, a large-scale reorganisation of urban surface transport routes in central Moscow was implemented. The new routes affected the Garden Ring, Tverskaya Zastava, and the Krasnopresnenskaya Embankment.

At the beginning of 2018, 72 Mosgortrans routes switched to a turnstile-free boarding system.

In February 2019, Moscow Mayor Sergei Sobyanin reported that surface transport had almost reached the same passenger volumes as the Moscow Metro, with approximately 7.4 million trips on weekdays.

From 1 February 2021, as part of measures to restructure the management of surface transport and explore potential corporatisation or liquidation of Mosgortrans, the management of the tram system was transferred to the State Unitary Enterprise Moscow Metro.

On 14 September 2021 (in test mode), and later officially on 1 October 2021, Mosgortrans launched the on-demand transport service "On the Way" in TiNAO. The service was later expanded to the Skolkovo Innovation Centre.

On 1 May 2025, the Mosgortrans team was awarded the Honorary Badge of the Russian Federation "For Success in Work" for achieving high performance in production activities.

=== Chronology of names of urban passenger transport enterprises ===
- Since 1900 — Moscow City Railways (MGZHD), which supervised tram transport.
- Since 1924 — under the control of the Moscow Municipal Economy (MKH), which oversaw bus transport.
- Since 1930 — Mosavtobus and Mostramvai trusts; since 1933, the Mostrolleybus trust. From 1938, all three trusts were subordinated to the transport department of the Moscow City Council.
- Since 1954 — Department of Passenger Motor Transport (UPAT).
- Since 1955 — Tram and Trolleybus Administration (TTU).

=== Chronology of names of a single urban passenger transport company ===
- Since 1958 — Department of Passenger Transport of the Moscow City Executive Committee (UPTM).
- Since 1980 — Main Directorate of Urban Passenger Transport (Glavmosgortrans).
- Since 1989 — Moscow Inter-Industry Production Association Mosgortrans (MMPO Mosgortrans).
- Since 1991 — Moscow Passenger Transport Committee (KPTM).
- Since 1992 — Municipal Company Mosgortrans (MK Mosgortrans).
- Since 1994 — State-Owned Mosgortrans Company (Mosgortrans Group of Companies).
- Since 1999 — Mosgortrans State Enterprise (GP Mosgortrans).
- Since 2001 — Mosgortrans State Unitary Enterprise (SUE Mosgortrans).

== Rolling stock ==
All buses are currently delivered to Mosgortrans only in low-floor versions. The last high-floor buses were purchased in 2005, and the last trolleybuses in 2006. The final semi-low-floor buses were acquired in 2009, and the last trolleybuses in 2012.

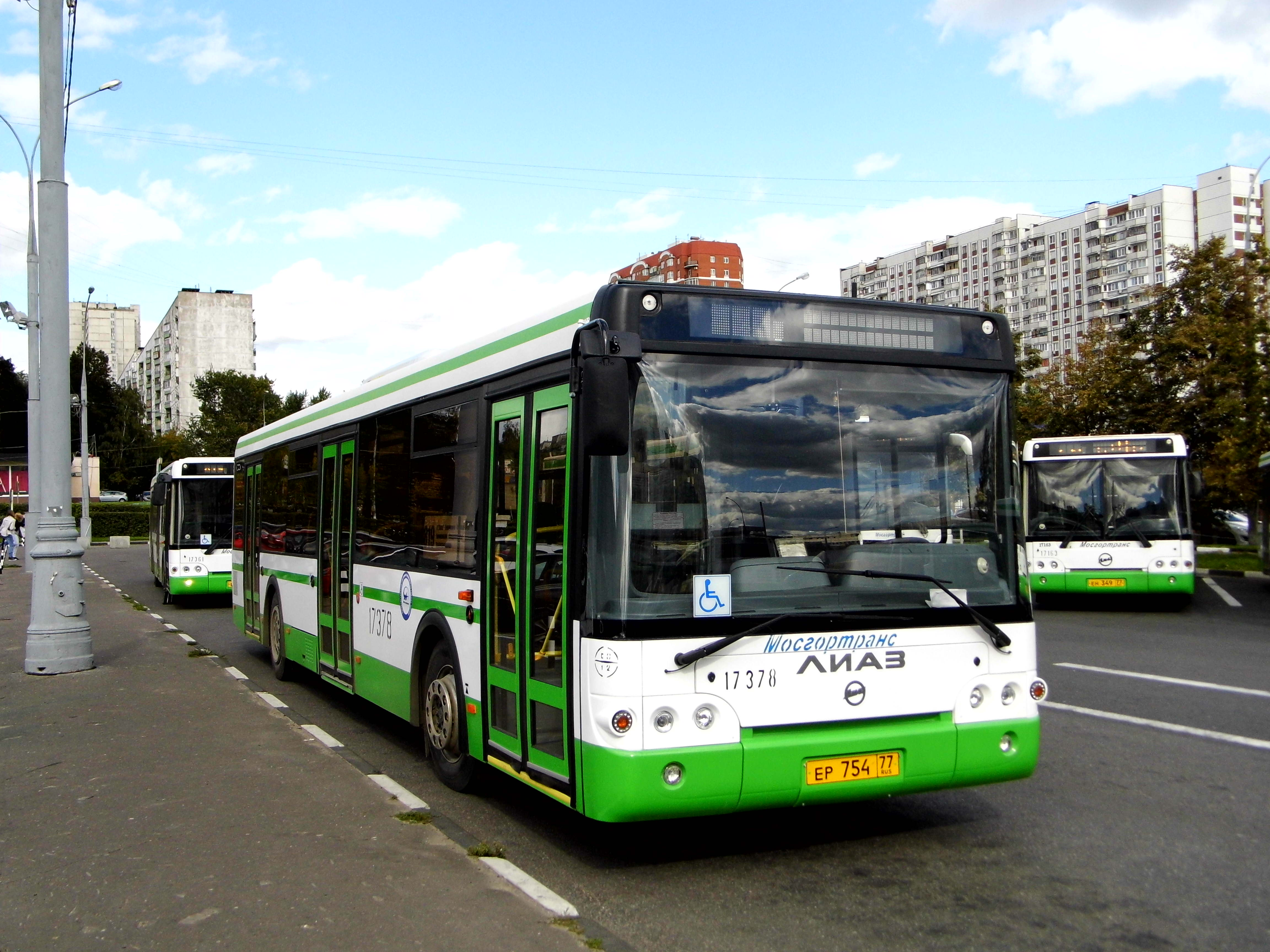
LiAZ-5292 bus

Since 2014, low-floor trams of particularly large capacity (articulated) have been delivered.

In the late 2000s, three-section trams were tested in Moscow. Beginning in 2015, new Pesa Fokstrot three-section trams entered service at the Krasnopresnenskoye tram depot. Since March 2017, new Vityaz-M three-section trams have also been introduced. These models are characterised by low floors and silent operation. The trams are operated by the Bauman and Oktyabrskoye depots, and deliveries continue to the Rusakova depot. Vityaz-M trams serve passengers in the north-eastern, eastern, south-eastern, southern, and central parts of Moscow.

Since June 2018, Vityaz-M trams have been supplied with an updated interior, increasing seating capacity from 60 to 64 and adding an additional luggage area. Each tram is equipped with media screens providing real-time information on routes, stops, and transfers, as well as climate control, satellite navigation, video surveillance, free Wi-Fi, and USB ports for charging mobile devices.

The bus fleet is also being modernised. By the end of 2018, 571 Euro V standard buses had been delivered to Mosgortrans depots, meeting the same comfort criteria as trams. The company currently operates articulated NefAZ-6299 buses, which serve as the basis for the planned production of articulated KAMAZ-6292 electric buses.

=== Electric buses ===
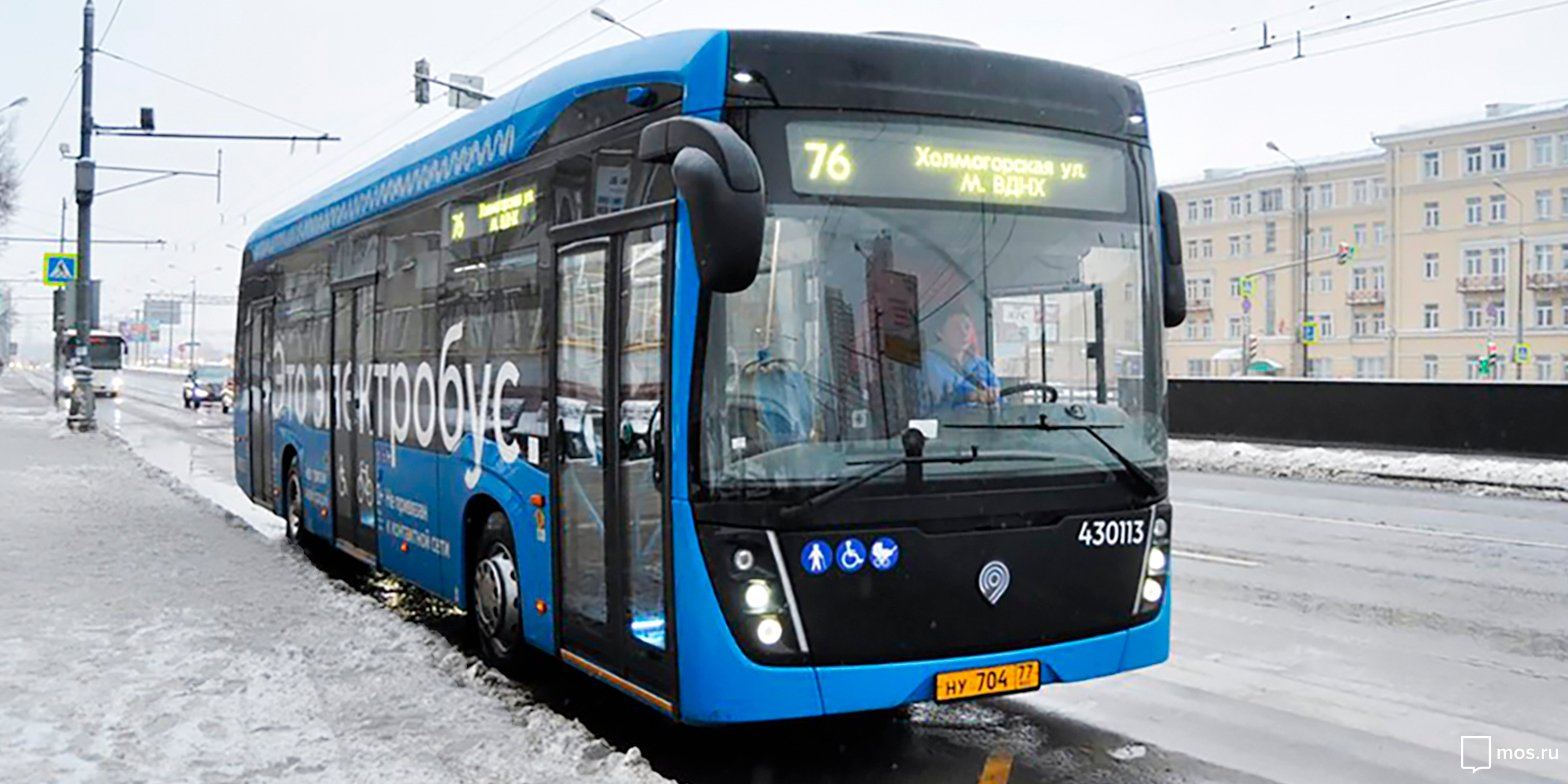
Electric bus produced by KAMAZ on route 76, Moscow, December 2018

The rolling stock also includes electric buses manufactured by KAMAZ and LiAZ (the latter under the GAZ brand).

As of 20 August 2020, 455 electric buses had entered service in Moscow — 193 in the North-Eastern branch and 262 in the Central branch. Three contracts for 2019 were fully completed, and 2020 contracts were in progress. Since 15 July 2019, electric buses have operated on the Sk route (later renumbered Sk1), followed by route 107 on 10 August 2019, and route 42 (renumbered t42) on 9 September 2019. Additional routes were successively converted, including routes t25 and 789, with the last trolleybus operations in the North-Eastern branch ceasing on 9 September 2019.

By 2020, an additional 300 electric buses were ordered for the Tsentralny branch — 200 for the Leningrad depot and 100 for the Davydov depot. Charging infrastructure was installed at several terminal points, including Filevsky Park, Krylatskoye, Ozernaya, Park Pobedy, Kievsky railway station, and Udarnik Cinema.

=== Minibuses ===
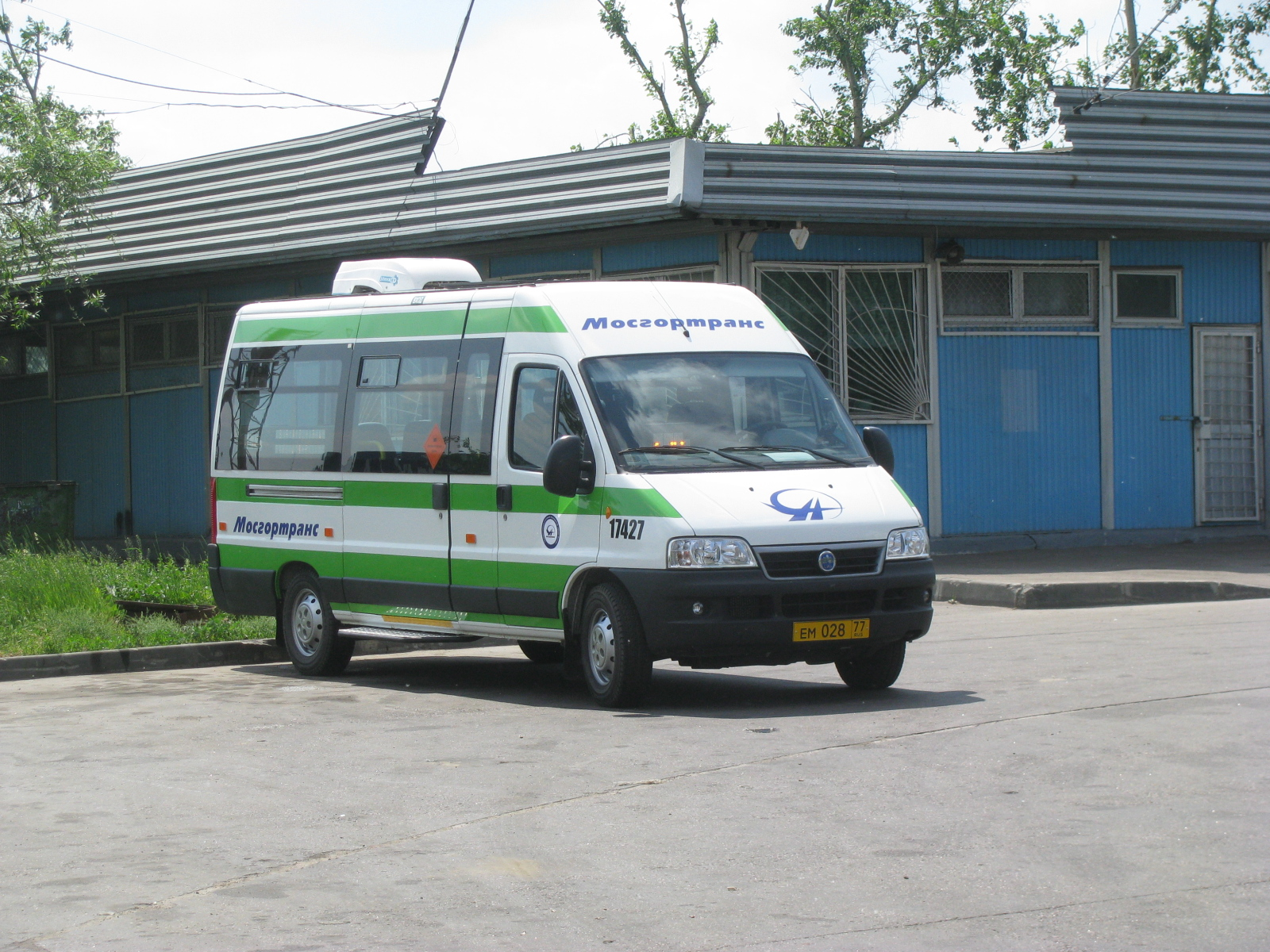
FIAT Ducato minibus

In addition to standard buses, Mosgortrans operates Mercedes-Benz Sprinter minibuses on regular routes using standard travel documents and benefits (except for the On-the-Way service). These minibuses are used on routes unsuitable for full-sized buses and on certain weekend services. Travel is limited to seated passengers, as indicated by on-board information referring to the relevant government decree (as amended on 28 April 2015).

In the past, Gazelle and Bychok minibuses operated privately without concessionary fares. These were later decommissioned and sold across Russia. Between 2009 and 2017, Fiat Ducato minibuses were used on both existing and newly introduced short routes. From mid-2015, Fiat Ducato vehicles began to be withdrawn due to low passenger demand and the expiration of their service life. In 2017, Mosgortrans purchased 85 Mercedes-Benz Sprinter minibuses, distributed across all depots except the 17th. The remaining 16 Fiat Ducato minibuses were transferred from the operational fleet to official transport duties.

== See also ==
- Mostransavto
- Electric buses in Moscow
- Trams in Moscow
