= Low-emission buses in New York City =

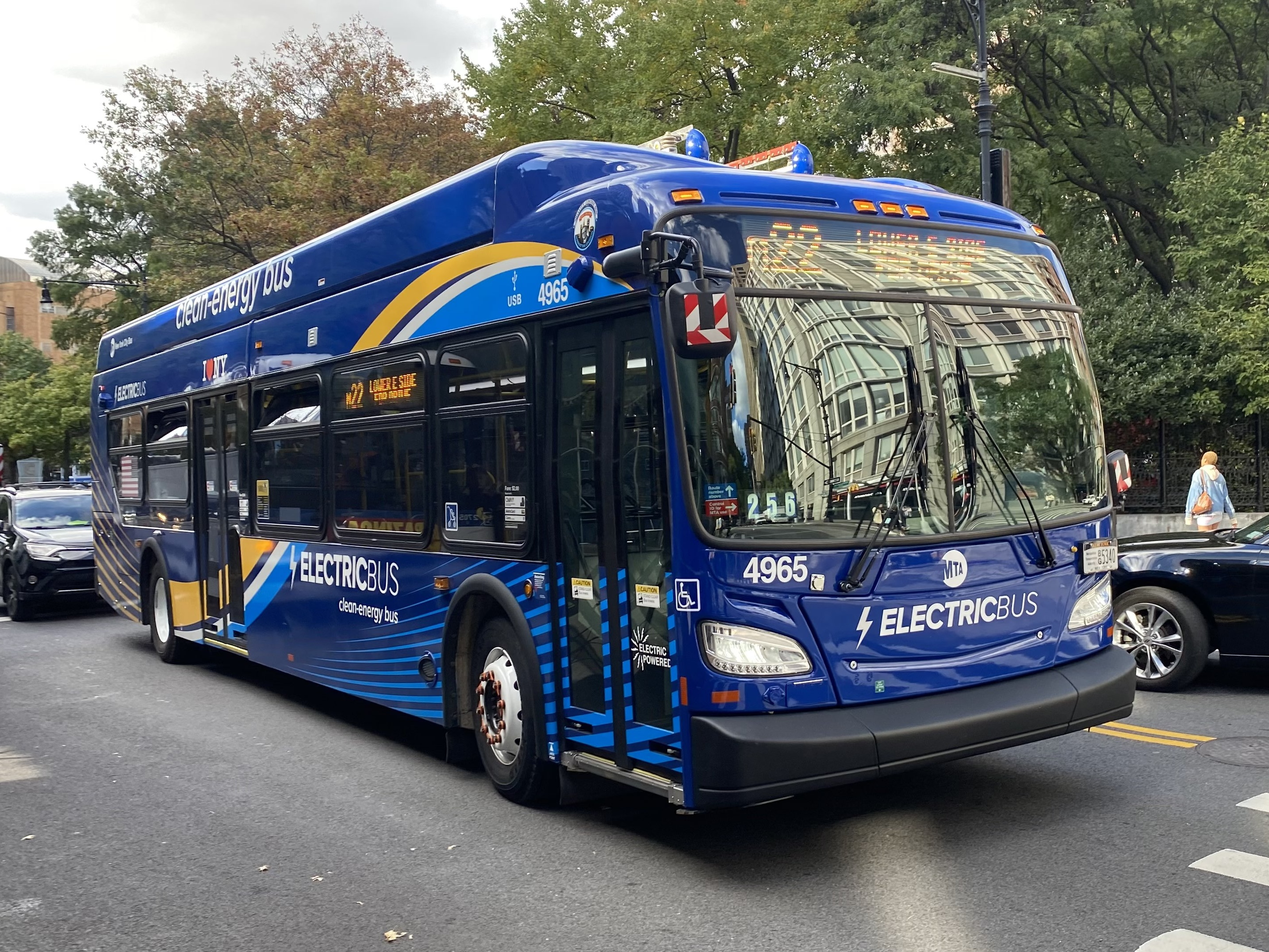
A New Flyer XE40 battery electric bus

There were 967 hybrid buses, 732 compressed natural gas (CNG) buses, and 15 battery electric buses operating in New York City as of June 2023—amounting to around 30% of the city's fleet of around 5,700 buses.

Compared to other major North American cities, New York City has a smaller number of low-emission buses, with Los Angeles Metropolitan Transportation Authority having around 2,000 CNG and 50 battery electric buses in service, and the Toronto Transit Commission having around 600 hybrid and 210 electric buses in service. Compared to cities internationally, New York City also has a smaller number of low-emission buses, with London, Moscow, and Paris having 3,000, 2,700, and 1,100 electric buses in service respectively.

The Metropolitan Transportation Authority (MTA) notes that they expect to purchase only zero-emission buses from 2029 onwards, and aim to have a fully zero-emission bus fleet by 2040.

== Background ==
New York City is home to an extensive bus system in each of the five boroughs, with over 330 bus routes and an annual ridership of over 400 million in 2024. The majority of buses used by the Metropolitan Transportation Authority (MTA) are diesel buses.

The city has high levels of air pollution, with a 1993 study concluding that 53% of particulate matter in Manhattan was from diesel engines—such as those used in transit buses. Diesel exhaust produces particulate pollution, as well as nitrogen oxides and sulfur dioxide—exposure to diesel exhaust leads to health issues including asthma and lung cancer, leading to premature deaths. In 1985, the Natural Resources Defense Council stated that diesel exhaust is a "serious and growing threat to health and the environment", adding that the situation was "particularly acute [in New York City] because of the large numbers of buses". In the 1990s, the Environmental Protection Agency cited the city for exceeding federal health standards for particulate matter, ozone, and carbon monoxide. The New York Times stated in 1996 that "buses have long been notorious for the black soot many of them spew out of their exhaust pipes".

Asthma disproportionately affects low-income residents and communities of color, with hospitalization rates nearly 10 times higher. Since the 1970s, New York City has worked to improve air quality, with reduced levels of particulate pollution, nitrogen oxides, and sulfur dioxides in the city, as well as fewer smog-alert days.

New York City has set a target of reducing greenhouse gas emissions by 80% by 2050. Transport is the second-highest source of greenhouse gas emissions in New York City—with the majority from gasoline and diesel vehicles. In 2019, New York State signed the Climate Leadership and Community Protection Act into law, which sets goals to reduce emissions to 40% below 1990 levels by 2030 and then to 85% below 1990 levels by 2050.

As of 2025, there are several alternatives to diesel transit buses that produce less emissions and particulate pollution.

- Compressed natural gas buses are powered by compressed natural gas (CNG), with lower tailpipe carbon dioxide (CO_{2}) emissions and significantly less particulate pollution than diesel buses. CNG is also cheaper than diesel fuel.
- Hybrid electric buses use a combination of an electric battery pack and a diesel engine to provide power, and produce around 40% less CO_{2} emissions than traditional diesel-engined buses. Energy recovered during braking is used to charge the batteries of hybrid vehicles.
- Battery electric buses use on-board batteries to power an electric motor that drives the bus. Unlike a hybrid electric bus, there are no local emissions. As with hybrid buses, regenerative braking is used to charge the batteries.
- Hydrogen fuel cell buses use the reaction of hydrogen with oxygen to generate electricity that drives the bus with an electric motor. The only emission from the bus is water.

== Operational history ==
=== Initial efforts ===
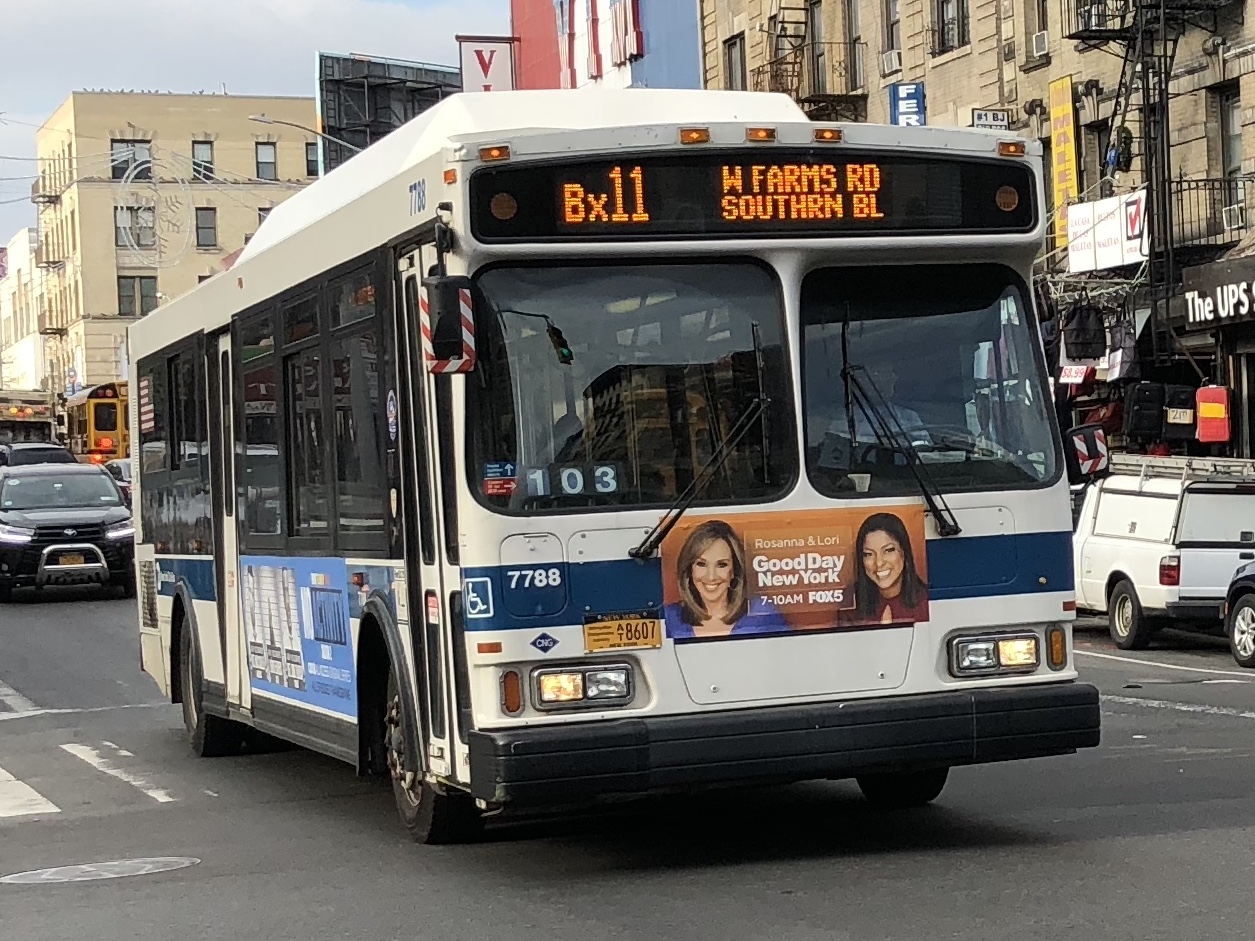
Orion VII OG bus powered by compressed natural gas, operated between 2004 and 2024

In 1990, the New York State Department of Environmental Conservation adopted California emission standards set by the California Air Resources Board for all new vehicles sold in the state. In 1991, New York City Local Law 6 mandated that 20% of the city's annual bus purchases should be powered by alternative fuels to diesel from the 1993/94 financial year onwards.

In 1986, it was announced that the MTA would trial methanol fuel, with buses entering service in 1992. Other cities also trialed methanol buses, with Los Angeles purchasing over 300, but suffered a high number of engine failures. MTA withdrew its methanol buses in 1995, after "[recognizing methanol] was no longer a viable option for future bus purchases".

In 1992, New York City Transit Authority (NYCT) began trialing buses powered by compressed natural gas (CNG). Although less polluting than diesel buses, officials noted that CNG buses were around $42,000 more expensive and that depots would need to be modified to handle CNG. In 1996, a reluctant MTA agreed to replace more diesel buses with CNG buses, following pressure from Governor George Pataki and New York State Senator Norman J. Levy. Mass-ordering of CNG buses began in 1999, and over 220 CNG buses were in service by 2001. The Natural Resources Defense Council noted that CNG buses are not pollution-free, but they are "clearly the best choice among the commercially available options".

In 1997, West Harlem Environmental Action launched the "Dirty Diesel" campaign to push the MTA to purchase cleaner diesel and CNG buses, following a report from the Environmental Protection Agency that indicated that levels of air pollution in northern Manhattan exceeded federal standards by "as much as 200 percent". In 1999, several campaign groups including Natural Resources Defense Council, the Regional Plan Association, and the New York State branch of the American Lung Association criticized the MTA's progress at introducing clean buses, stating that delays will "subject New Yorkers to [...] unacceptably high diesel fumes and unnecessarily high health impacts". In November 2000, West Harlem Environmental Action filed a complaint with the US Department of Transportation (USDOT), claiming that bus depots were "disproportionately located in minority communities", leading to health risks owing to "high exposure to harmful diesel exhaust". The USDOT found that the MTA violated Title IV of the Civil Rights Act of 1964 and failed to meet the federal environmental impact analysis involving the construction, rehabilitation, and operation of bus depots and other facilities.

In April 2000, the MTA and state lawmakers agreed to an uplift in the percentage of new CNG or hybrid buses purchased as part of the 2000–2004 Capital Plan. Under the agreement, around 44% of new bus purchases would be CNG or hybrid buses, an uplift of 16%. In June 2000, the MTA established a "Clean Fuel Bus" program. Cleaner diesel buses were purchased, older buses had their engines replaced, and all buses began to use ultra-low-sulfur diesel in combination with the fitment of diesel particulate filters. By 2003, all buses were fitted with diesel particulate filters. The MTA noted that their purchase of millions of gallons of ultra-low-sulfur diesel meant that there was enough demand for it to be produced in the United States at a cheaper cost, rather than having to be imported from a refinery in Rotterdam, Netherlands. This led to other transit agencies in the United States, including Massachusetts Bay Transportation Authority and NJ Transit, to start using ultra-low-sulfur diesel.

By 2002, The New York Times reported that "it is now hard to spot a city bus trailing even a modest cloud of black smoke", and that "environmentalists [...] seem impressed by the progress the agency has made toward meeting the goals set in Albany to improve the city's air". By 2006, particulate emissions had fallen by 290 tons from 1995 levels (a reduction of 97%), with nitrogen oxide emissions falling by 2,781 tons from 1995 levels (a reduction of 47%). Researchers noted that this improvement in emissions occurred despite a 27% increase in the number of buses and a 17% increase in the number of miles driven.

=== Introduction of hybrids ===
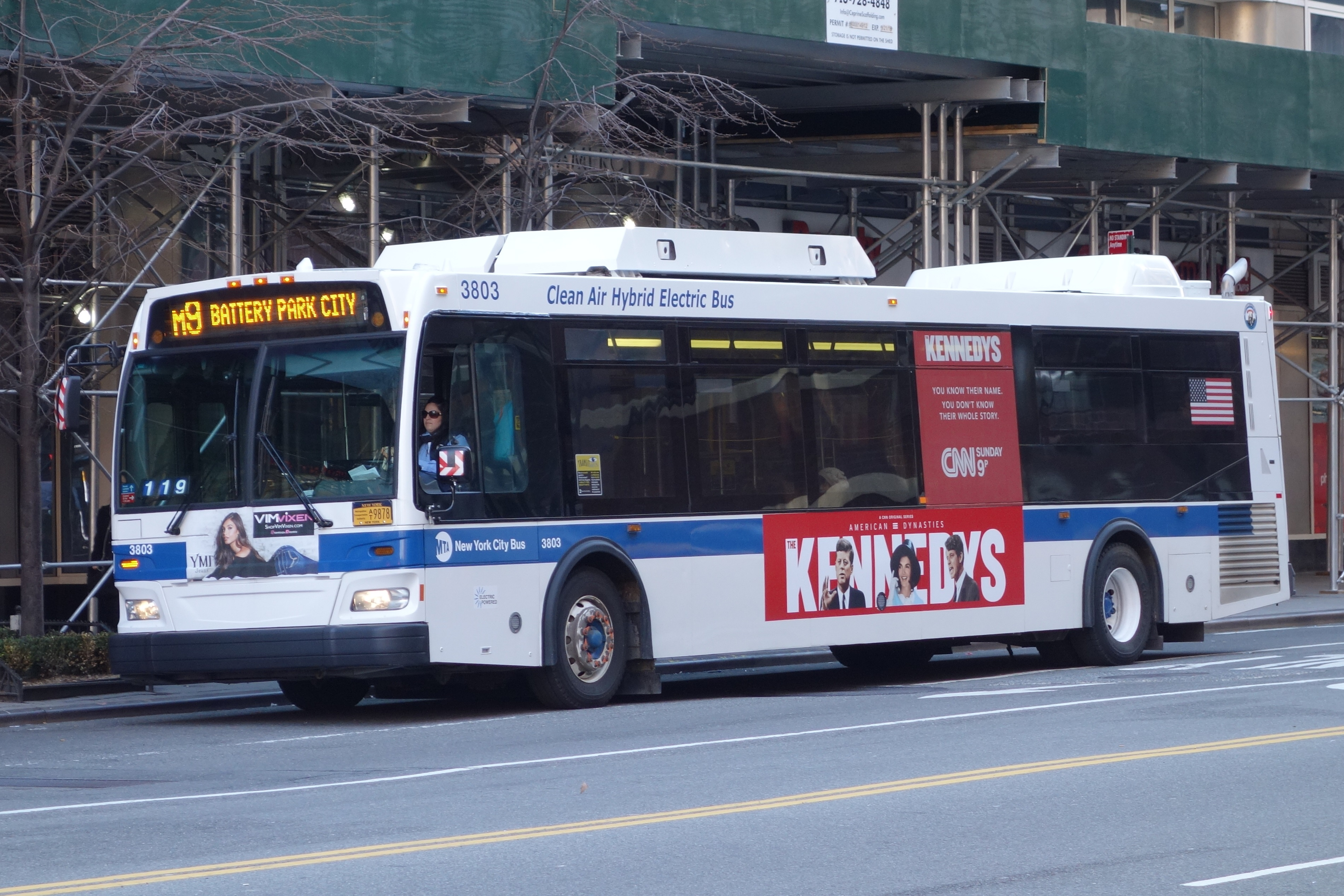
Orion VII NG hybrid-electric bus, operated between 2008 and 2024

In September 1998, the MTA began to trial hybrid-electric buses, which operate with a combination of diesel and electric power. The Orion VI hybrid buses purchased by the MTA cost around $1 million each, substantially more than an equivalent-sized diesel or CNG bus. However, replacing diesel buses with CNG ones require expensive improvements to bus depots.

From 2003, the MTA began to order hybrid buses en-masse, purchasing the Orion VII. These entered regular service from April 2004. In 2005, the MTA announced plans to purchase hybrid buses in future instead of CNG buses, noting the cost of upgrading bus depots. By 2009, over 850 hybrid buses were in service, around 19% of the bus fleet. The MTA noted that by 2010, they would have the "largest diesel-electric hybrid fleet in the world" with over 1,700 buses.

In 2008, research by the National Renewable Energy Laboratory showed that second-generation hybrid buses (those ordered from 2006 onwards) cost around 40% less to maintain than earlier hybrid units, with comparable maintenance costs to CNG buses. It also showed that they cost 24% less to operate than earlier hybrid buses, owing to improved fuel economy (3.00–3.22 mpg_{‑US}; 0.78–0.73 L/km). This was also more fuel efficient than the 2.33 mpg_{‑US} (1.01 L/km) diesel equivalent for the CNG buses.

In 2013, media reported that the MTA was considering replacing out-of-warranty hybrid units with new diesel engines, with sources stating that the hybrids were less reliable than diesel buses.

=== Introduction of battery electric buses ===
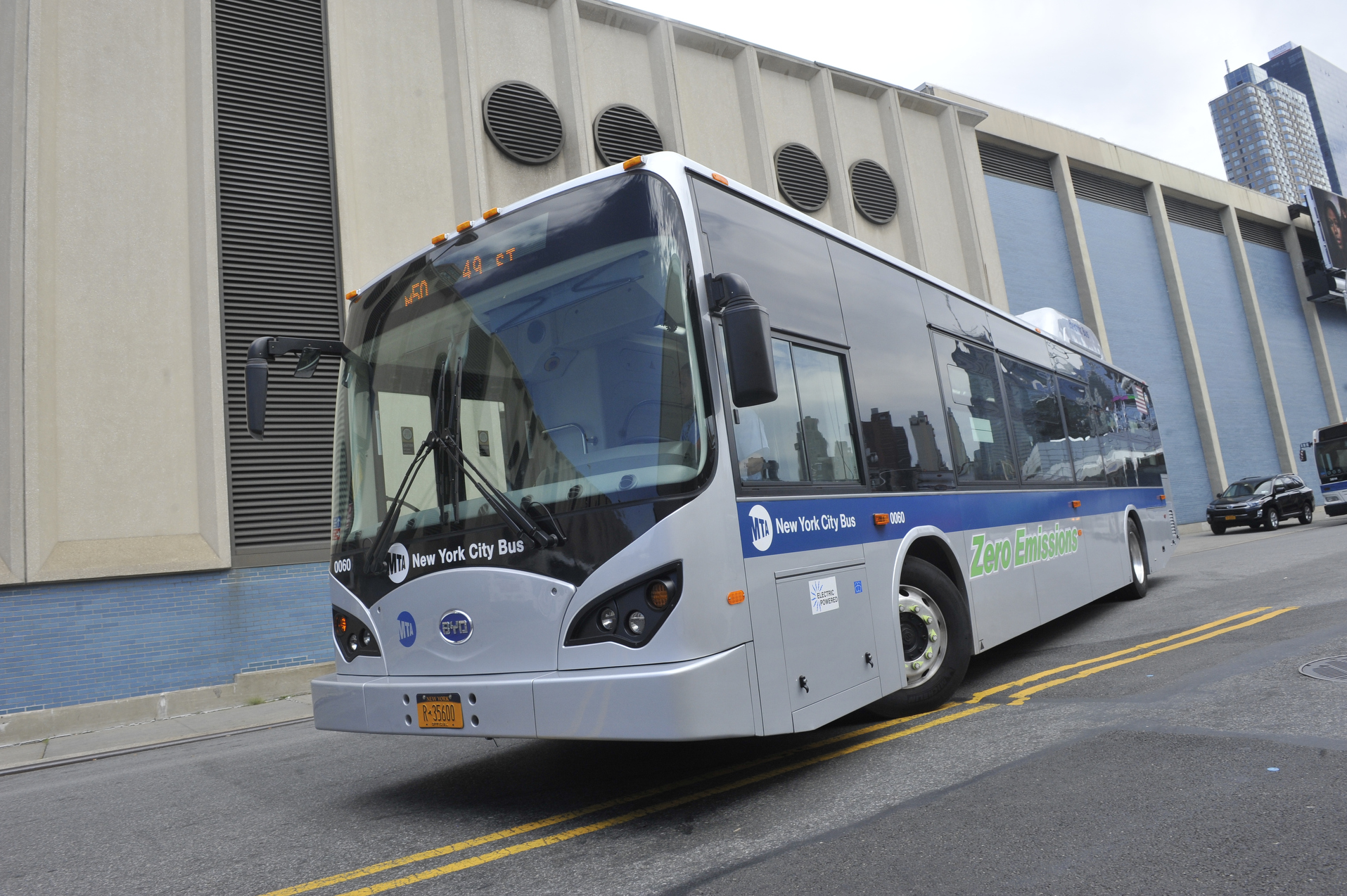
BYD K9 battery-electric bus being trialed in 2013

In 2013, the MTA partnered with BYD Auto to pilot an battery electric bus in service over a two-month period.

In 2016, Columbia University published a report commissioned by NYCT that analyzed the possibility of transitioning to an electric bus fleet. The report noted that:

- electric buses (and the required charging infrastructure) cost around $300k more to purchase than diesel buses
- electric buses are around $39k cheaper to run per year, given the lower cost of electricity compared to diesel or CNG fuel
- savings associated with fuel and bus maintenance "more than offsets the higher [upfront] cost of electric buses"
- an all-electric fleet would lead to a reduction of emissions within the city of "approximately 575,000 metric tons of CO2e per year"
- health benefits from the elimination of air pollution caused by diesel fuel combustion was estimated at $150k per bus
- a number of cities around the world are considering changing to electric buses

The report concluded that the city should "take the first steps towards purchasing electric buses", in light of the financial savings and that the resulting "health benefits and greenhouse gas reductions are [...] compelling".

In January 2018, Governor Andrew Cuomo announced that the MTA would test electric buses on a three-year trial, running on bus routes in Brooklyn, Queens, and midtown Manhattan. Ten 40-foot battery electric buses were leased: five from New Flyer and five from Proterra, the XE40 Xcelsior CHARGE and Catalyst BE40 models respectively. The MTA noted that it planned to order 60 electric buses in a future testing phase, depending on the results of the initial trials. The leases expired in 2021, with the MTA noting that they had learned several things from the trial, including that:

- each manufacturer has "proprietary charging protocols"
- batteries could only support one-third of existing schedules, due to insufficient range
- air temperature affects battery range

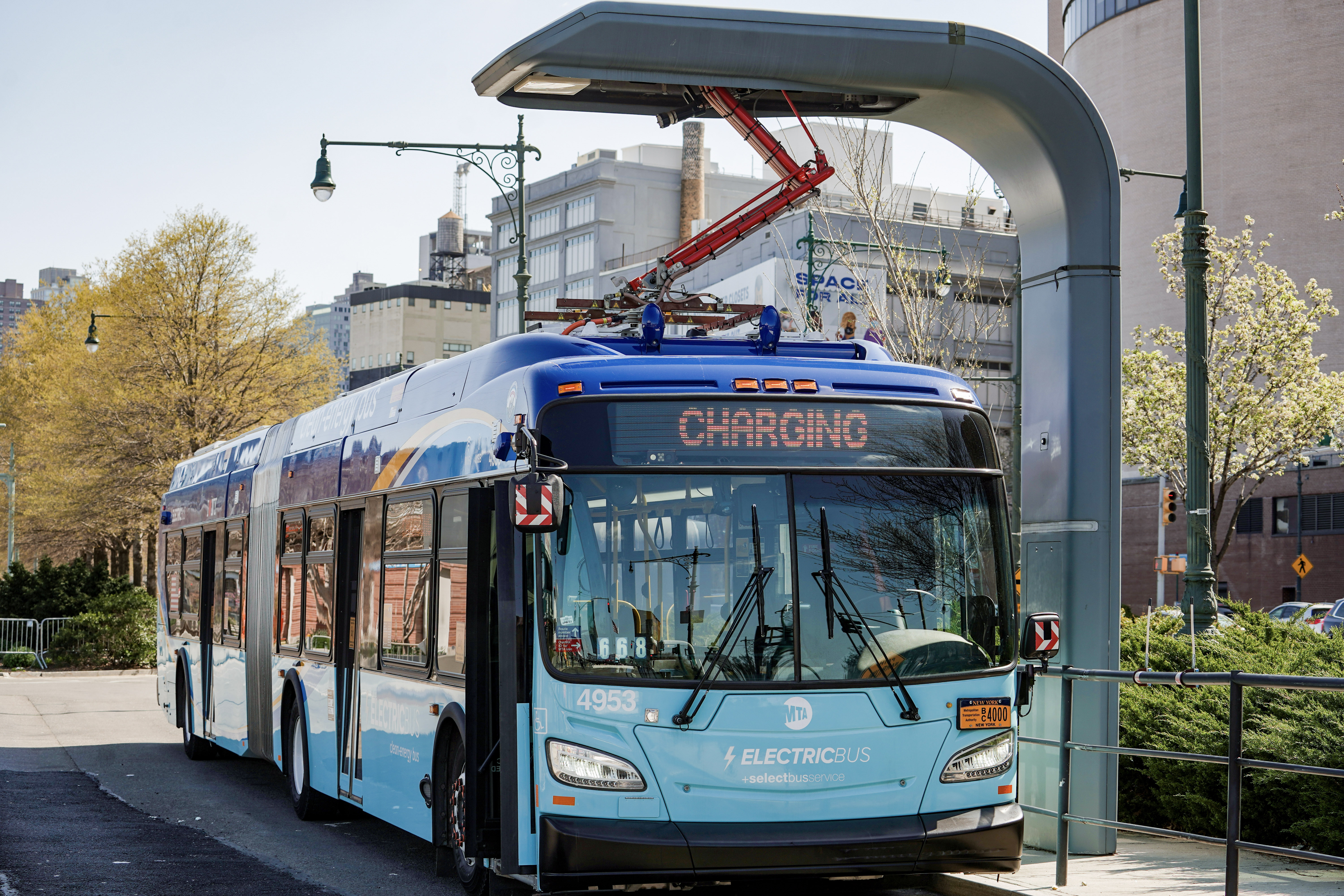
New Flyer XE60 battery-electric articulated bus being charged

In April 2018, NYCT President Andy Byford published the MTA Bus Action Plan, which proposed a transition to a fully electric bus fleet by 2040. This was widely welcomed by advocacy groups, including Sierra Club and Tri-State Transportation Campaign.

In 2019, MTA purchased zero-emission buses for the first time, ordering 15 battery-electric 60-foot articulated buses from New Flyer. These entered service in 2020, primarily Manhattan Select Bus Service routes. In September 2019, the MTA Board approved its 2020–2024 Capital Plan, which included $1.1 billion to purchase 500 electric buses and retrofit eight bus depots with charging equipment. In 2020, the MTA announced that it would be purchasing renewable natural gas for its CNG buses, with the natural gas produced from organic waste. In 2021, the MTA purchased 135 diesel buses from Nova Bus, noting that they would continue to purchase diesel buses until 2028, despite the plan for a fully electric bus fleet by 2040.

In April 2021, the MTA placed a request for proposals for 45 new 40-foot battery-electric buses. Later in 2021, the MTA awarded New Flyer the contract for the electric bus order, set to arrive in late 2022 and 2023. Fifteen more buses were added to the original 45-bus contract, making for a total of 60 buses allotted for NYCT; these were delivered in 2024.

In May 2022, the MTA published its Zero-Emission Bus Transition Plan, which set out a plan for transitioning the bus fleet to zero emissions, as well as setting out the challenges and issues of such a transition. This was updated in 2024, setting out a phased approach to reach a 100% zero-emission bus fleet. In April 2025, the MTA Board approved the 2025–2029 Capital Plan, which includes funds to expand the fleet to over 1,000 battery electric buses, as well as work to retrofit existing bus depots. In June 2025, media reported that New Flyer battery electric buses were not as reliable in service as diesel buses.

In June 2026, the MTA expressed concerns about bus electrification, noting that their electric buses averaged 2,500 miles between failures, compared to 8,500 miles for diesel buses. It also had concerns about the wider bus industry and its ability to meet its requirements – noting that the bus industry was suffering from inflation, supply chain challenges and an unstable labor market. Nova Bus exited the U.S. market in 2025, leaving the MTA with only two manufacturers to order from. The MTA did note that seven bus depots should be ready to handle electric buses by 2027, with plans to electrify four more. Plans to order 500 more electric buses were paused, and the MTA would order more diesel buses as a stop-gap.

== Future plans ==
The number of zero-emission buses is due to increase to 1,035 by 2029. The MTA is aiming for the entire bus fleet to be zero-emission by 2040, although in 2023, MTA officials expressed doubts that the fleet would be fully electrified by that date. In 2022, the MTA announced that they would conduct a limited test of hydrogen fuel cell buses, funded by a grant from New York State Energy Research and Development Authority. The first two buses (New Flyer Xcelsior CHARGE H2) will be launched in the Bronx by late 2025.

== Summary of current operations ==
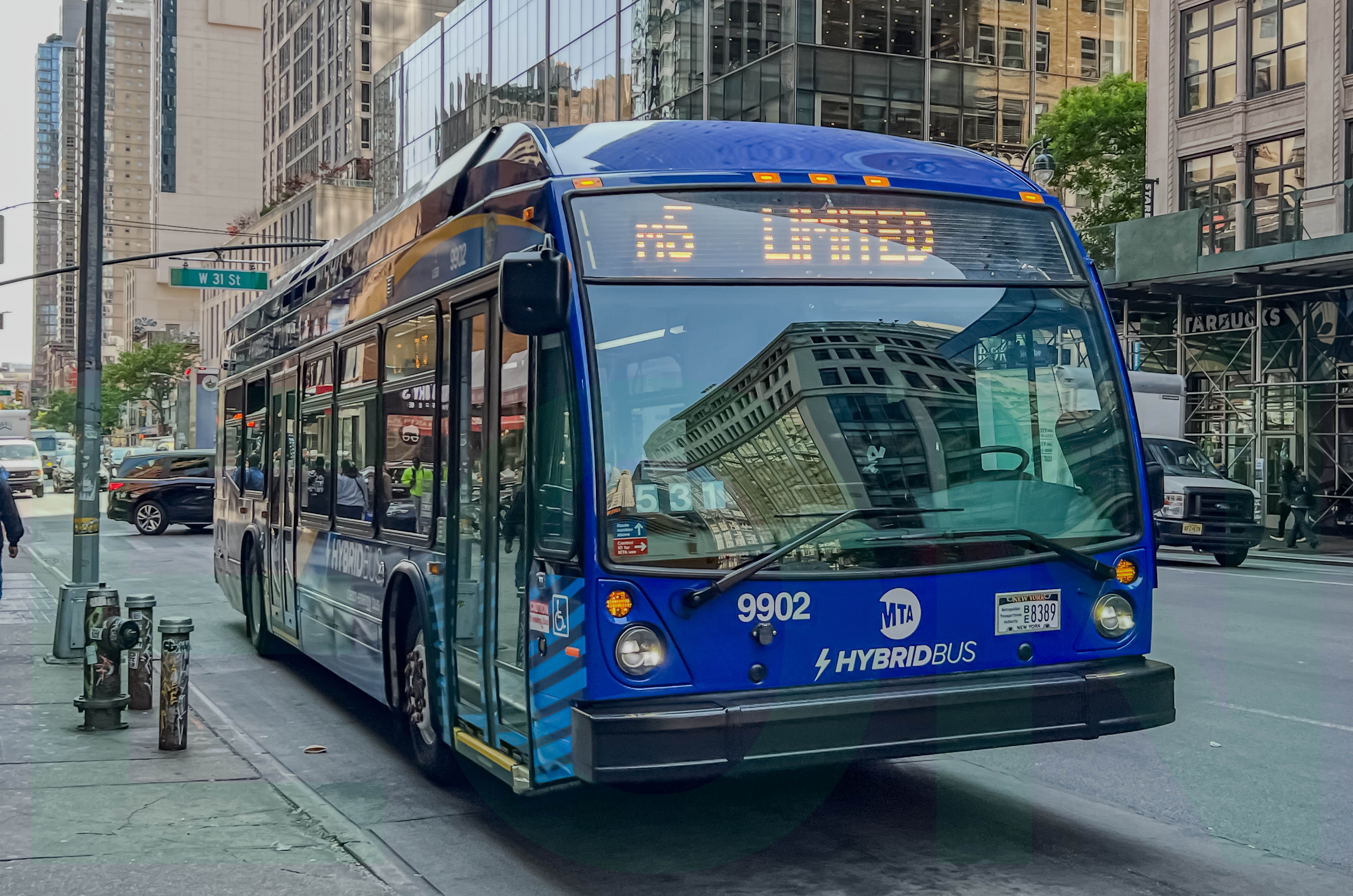
Nova Bus LFS HEV hybrid-electric bus

There are 967 hybrid buses, 732 compressed natural gas (CNG) buses, and 15 battery electric buses operating in New York City as of June 2023, amounting to around 30% of the city's fleet of around 5,700 buses. In 2022, an academic study showed that the MTA's increased use of CNG and hybrid-electric buses between 2009 and 2014 led to improvements in air pollution across the city, including a reduction in nitrogen oxides.

- Hybrid buses currently used include the Orion VII NG, Nova Bus LFS HEV, and New Flyer XDE40 Xcelsior.
- Compressed natural gas buses currently used include the New Flyer C40LF Low Floor and New Flyer XN40 Xcelsior.
- Battery electric buses currently used include the New Flyer XE40 Xcelsior CHARGE and the New Flyer XE60 Xcelsior.

== Comparison ==
- As of June 2025, Paris has around 1,100 zero-emission buses, 1,300 hybrid buses, and 2,500 biomethane buses in service.
- As of December 2025, Moscow has over 2,700 electric buses in service.
- As of March 2025, New Delhi has around 3,190 CNG buses and 1,250 electric buses in service.
- As of June 2026, London has around 3,600 hybrid buses, 3,000 battery electric buses, and 20 hydrogen fuel cell buses in service.
- As of March 2025, Los Angeles has around 2,000 CNG and 50 battery electric buses in service.

== See also ==
- Low emission buses in London
- Electric buses in Moscow
- Electric buses in China
