= Heygate Estate =

Former housing estate in London

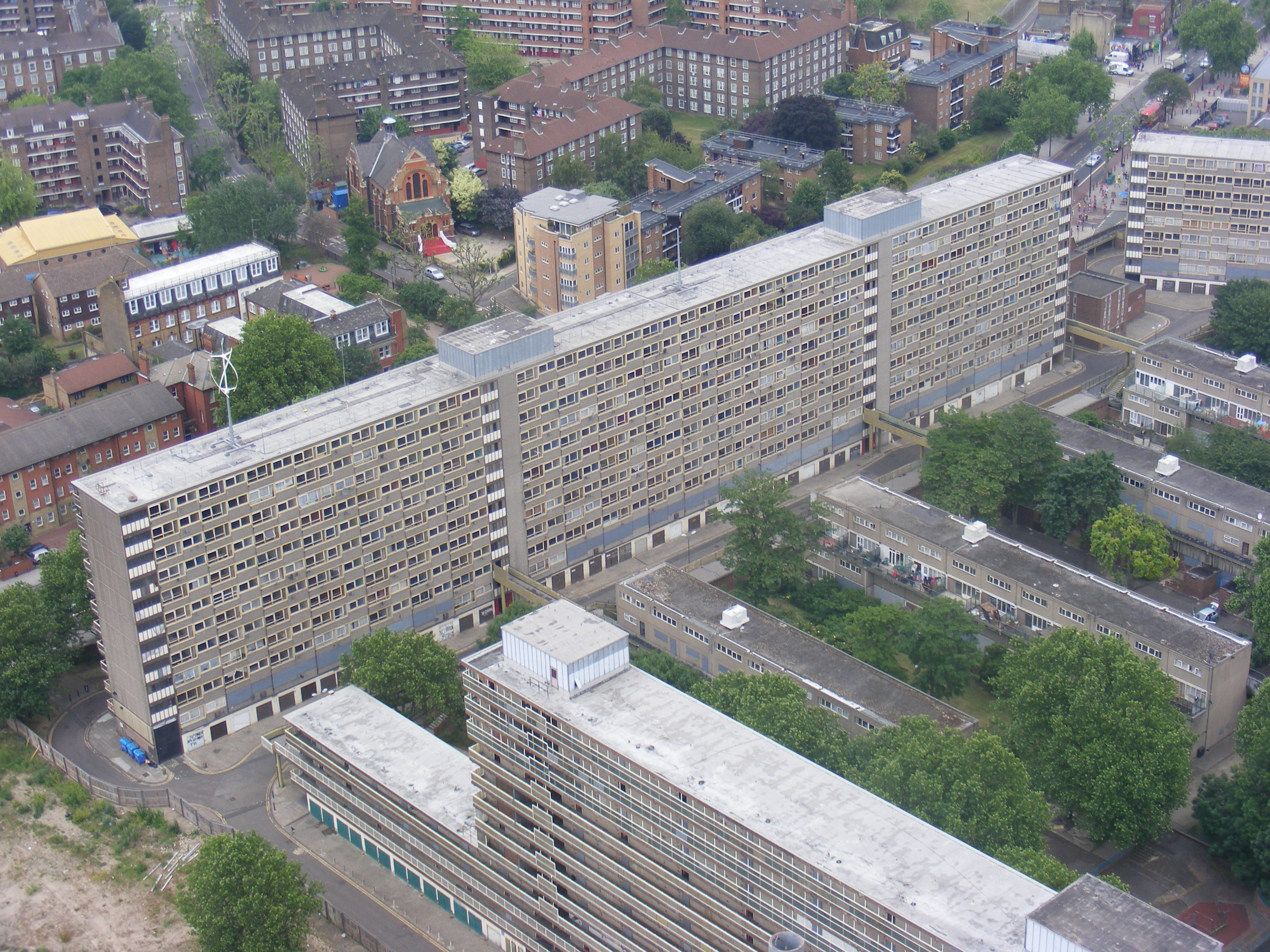
- Aerial view of the Heygate Estate
- Interactive map of Heygate Estate

General information
- Location: Elephant & Castle, Walworth, Southwark, London, England
- Coordinates: 51°29′35″N 0°05′46″W
- Status: Demolished

Construction
- Constructed: 1971–1974
- Architect: Tim Tinker and Roger Westman

Listing
- Demolished: 2011–14

Other information
- Governing body: Southwark Council

The Heygate Estate was a large housing estate in Walworth, Southwark, South London, comprising 1,214 homes, designed by architects Tim Tinker and Roger Westman. The estate was demolished between 2011 and 2014 as part of the urban regeneration of the Elephant & Castle area. Home to more than 3,000 people, it was situated adjacent to Walworth Road and New Kent Road, and immediately east of the Elephant & Castle road intersection. The estate was used extensively as a filming location, due in part to its brutalist architecture.

The clearance of the site and its sale to Lendlease for redevelopment was highly controversial.

== History ==
The Corbusian concept behind the construction of the estate was of a modern living environment. The neo-brutalist architectural aesthetic was one of tall, concrete blocks dwarfing smaller blocks, surrounding central communal gardens. The architect's concept was to link all areas of the estate via concrete bridges, so there was no need for residents to walk on pavements or along roads. It was even planned to build bridges to the neighbouring Aylesbury Estate, further south in Walworth.

Designed by Tim Tinker, the estate was completed in 1974.

The estate was once a popular place to live, the flats being thought light and spacious, but the estate later developed a reputation for crime, poverty and dilapidation. One resident complained about constant noise, crime and threats of violence as a result of the estate being used for temporary housing ahead of its redevelopment. He claimed that the sheer scale of many of the blocks also meant there was little sense of community. However, other residents disagreed that the estate should have been considered a slum and an eyesore, or that the buildings failed to foster a sense of community. Around 30 separate testimonies from former residents have been collated by a local microblogging site. Architect Tim Tinker described the estate's 'notorious' reputation as a "farrago of half-truths and lies put together by people who should have known better."

== Regeneration ==
In 1999 Southwark council's Director of Regeneration Fred Manson sparked controversy when in an interview about the Elephant & Castle regeneration he claimed that "social housing generates people on low incomes coming in and that generates poor school performances, middle-class people stay away."

The Elephant & Castle regeneration is a £1.5 billion scheme to redevelop the area around the Elephant & Castle road junction. The regeneration plan led to the demolition of the Heygate Estate, with the land planned to provide 2,704 new homes, of which 82 will be social rented. The demolition cost approximately £15 million, with an additional £44m spent on emptying the estate and a further £21.5 million spent on progressing its redevelopment.

Heygate residents were originally promised new homes as part of the regeneration, but these had not been built by the time they were 'decanted' from the estate in 2007. In an approach later dubbed "magical voluntarism", Southwark Council hired life coaches and "spiritual ministers" to run workshops for the stressed residents about to be displaced, rather than finding real-world solutions for the problems that it had caused.

In March 2010 only 20 of the 1200 flats were still occupied.

A council blunder in February 2013 revealed that Southwark had sold the 9-hectare estate to developers Lendlease at a huge loss, for just £50m, having spent £44m emptying the site and £21.5m on planning its redevelopment.

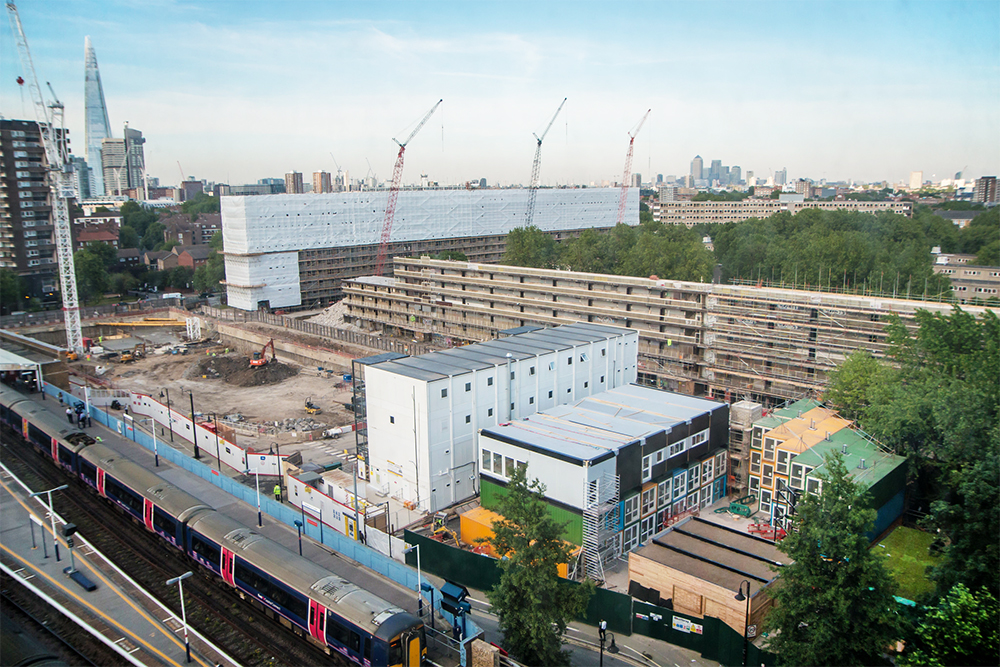
Demolition of the Heygate Estate and construction of Elephant Central – May 2014

Earlier regeneration plans had included a proposal for redevelopment of the estate under the auspices of a community land trust; however, the council had rejected this proposal on the grounds that it would reduce the land value available to itself.

In February 2013 the last remaining residents on the estate appeared at a public inquiry into the Compulsory Purchase Order issued on their homes. The residents were part of a local group named Better Elephant which proposed alternatives to demolition in its Neighbourhood Plan and were supported by Catherine Croft from the Twentieth Century Society who confirmed that the estate could "easily be refurbished".

The Compulsory Purchase Order was confirmed in July 2013 amid reports that the remaining residents were being forced to relocate to the outskirts of London.

In September 2013 a London Assembly report claimed that Southwark Council had looked at different options for the estate in 1998. It said the surveyors found that the buildings were structurally sound and suggested that the best option was refurbishment. It said that the survey also found that four in five residents did not want to move off the estate, and that the crime rate was half the average for the borough of Southwark.

In November 2013 the last resident was removed and all access points to the estate were closed. Ian Steadman wrote in the New Statesman that "What has happened here is that Southwark Council has lost money on evicting the Heygate Estate for the benefit of Lendlease, with no prospect of getting anything in return for it. In the process, an established community has been scattered throughout the borough and beyond."

In December 2013 the Design Council published an article, "in defence of the Heygate estate", in which it praised the architectural design, questioned the demolition and said that the estate "could have enjoyed a second life".

A July 2026 Guardian article on the regeneration of Elephant and Castle noted that in the housing that replaced the estate "there are 485 homes to rent across three towers, including just five at social rent tenure, 45 on London living rent (LLR) terms and 124 at discounted market rent.".

=== Timeline of developments ===
February 2004 — the masterplan for regenerating the Elephant and Castle, including the demolition of the Heygate Estate, was adopted by Southwark Council.

July 2007 – a consortium of Lendlease, First Base and Oakmayne were chosen as developers for the Elephant and Castle regeneration scheme.

July 2010 – Southwark Council signed a development agreement with Lendlease for the regeneration of Elephant and Castle.

April 2011 – demolition of the Heygate Estate began.

August 2012 – the remaining leaseholders on the estate were served with a Compulsory Purchase Order by Southwark Council. The group of leaseholders said they intended to object to the Order on the grounds that the redevelopment plan proposes no affordable housing and does not have a provision for renewable energy.

October 2012 – local MP Simon Hughes called for the first detailed Heygate planning application to be withdrawn because it proposed just eight social rented homes. Outline planning permission for the Heygate site proposes 2,535 new homes in total of which just 79 will be social rented.

November 2013 – the last remaining residents were evicted from the estate by bailiffs.

July 2014 – the Council leader was criticised for having accepted gifts from developer Lend Lease; these included a trip to MIPIM, a real estate jamboree in Cannes, and two £1,600 tickets to the 2012 Summer Olympics.

July 2014 – demolition of the Heygate Estate was completed earlier than expected. The land is presently being redeveloped as housing and retail space, and the area is being marketed as 'Elephant Park'.

== In popular culture ==
Due to its urban decay and location, the estate has been extensively used as a filming location. Films and TV productions have included Attack the Block, Shank, Harry Brown, The Veteran, World War Z, Luther (series 1 ep. 2), The Bill and gang drama Top Boy. High-profile music videos, including "Hung Up" by Madonna and "Love Don't Let Me Go (Walking Away)" by David Guetta vs The Egg, were also filmed on the estate. A total of 76 films were made on the estate over the three years to 2010, earning Southwark Council £91,000 in fees.

The Skygarden Estate in Ben Aaronovitch's book Broken Homes is based on the Heygate Estate. The Salisbury Estate in Mike Carey's Thicker Than Water blends the features of the Heygate Estate and the Aylesbury Estate.

== Transport ==
=== Buses ===
The estate was served by London Buses routes 42, 12, 35, 40, 45, 53, 63, 68, 136, 148, 168, 171, 172, 176, 188, 343, 363, 453, 468 and P5.

=== London Underground ===
The nearest station was Elephant & Castle on the Bakerloo and Northern lines.

=== National rail ===
The nearest station was Elephant & Castle for Southeastern and Thameslink services towards Ashford International, Bedford, Dover Priory, London Blackfriars, Luton, Sevenoaks, St Albans City, St Pancras, Sutton, West Hampstead and Wimbledon.

== See also ==
- Aylesbury Estate
- Ferrier Estate
