= Aylesbury Estate =

Housing estate in Walworth, London

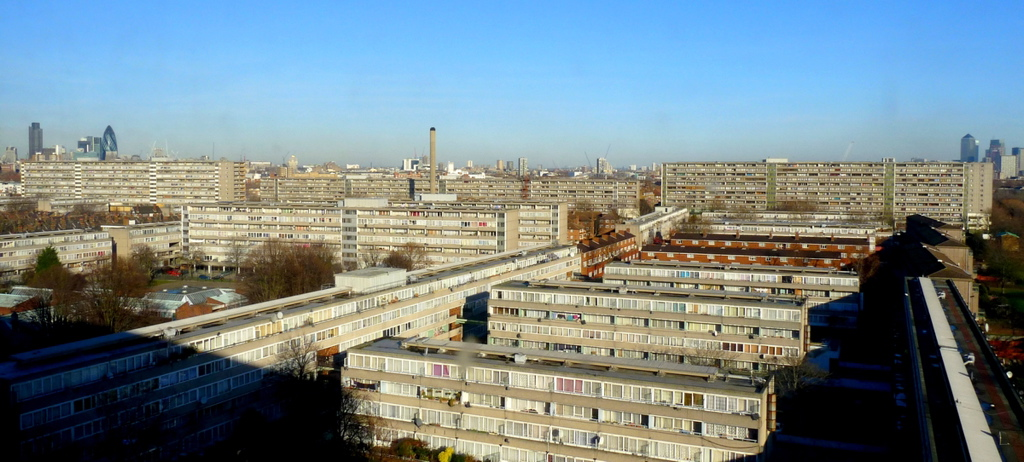
- Aylesbury Estate viewed from Chiltern
- Interactive map of Aylesbury Estate

General information
- Location: Walworth, Southwark, London, England
- Coordinates: 51.486°N 0.085°W
- Status: Ongoing Regeneration

Construction
- Constructed: 1963–1977

Listing
- Demolished: 2009 onwards

Other information
- Governing body: Southwark Council

The Aylesbury Estate is a large housing estate located in Walworth, South East London.

The Aylesbury Estate contains 2,704 dwellings, spread over a number of different blocks and buildings, and was built between 1963 and 1977. There are approximately 7,500 residents. The estate is currently undergoing a major regeneration programme.

Major problems with the physical buildings on the estate and the poor perception of estates in Britain as a whole have led to the Aylesbury Estate gaining the title of "one of the most notorious estates in the United Kingdom".

In 1997, Tony Blair chose to make his first speech as Prime Minister here, in an effort to demonstrate that the government would care for the poorest in society. The estate is often used as a typical example of urban decay.

The Aylesbury Estate is an ethnically diverse area: according to the most recent census, around 25% of respondents were White British, with Black ethnic groups accounting for over half of all respondents. Around a third (34%) of residents are of school age, and fewer than 1 in 10 are aged 65 or above. Nearly two-thirds of respondents identified themselves as being Christian, with 17% being Muslim.

== History ==
The estate was designed by architect Hans Peter "Felix" Trenton and construction started in 1963. Built on 285,000 square metres the estate was an attempt by planners to house some of London's poorest families. It was an effort of reconstruction as part of a comprehensive slum clearance policy by the Borough of Southwark. The 2,700 dwellings were designed to house a population of roughly 10,000 residents, making it one of the largest public housing estates in Europe. The estate is named after Aylesbury in Buckinghamshire and the various sections of the estate are named after other local towns and villages in Buckinghamshire including Foxcote, Wendover, Winslow, Padbury, Taplow, Ravenstone, Latimer and Chiltern. The estate's design embraces ideas of modernist urban planning as expressed by Le Corbusier in his 1935 vision of the Ville Radieuse, such as standardisation, free circulation of pedestrians and traffic and generous access to sunlight and natural ventilation.

In the 1970s residents in the ground floor flats successfully campaigned for gardens to be fenced-off adjoining their flats. The final blocks of flats were completed in 1977 and the estate included a nursery, a day centre and a health centre.

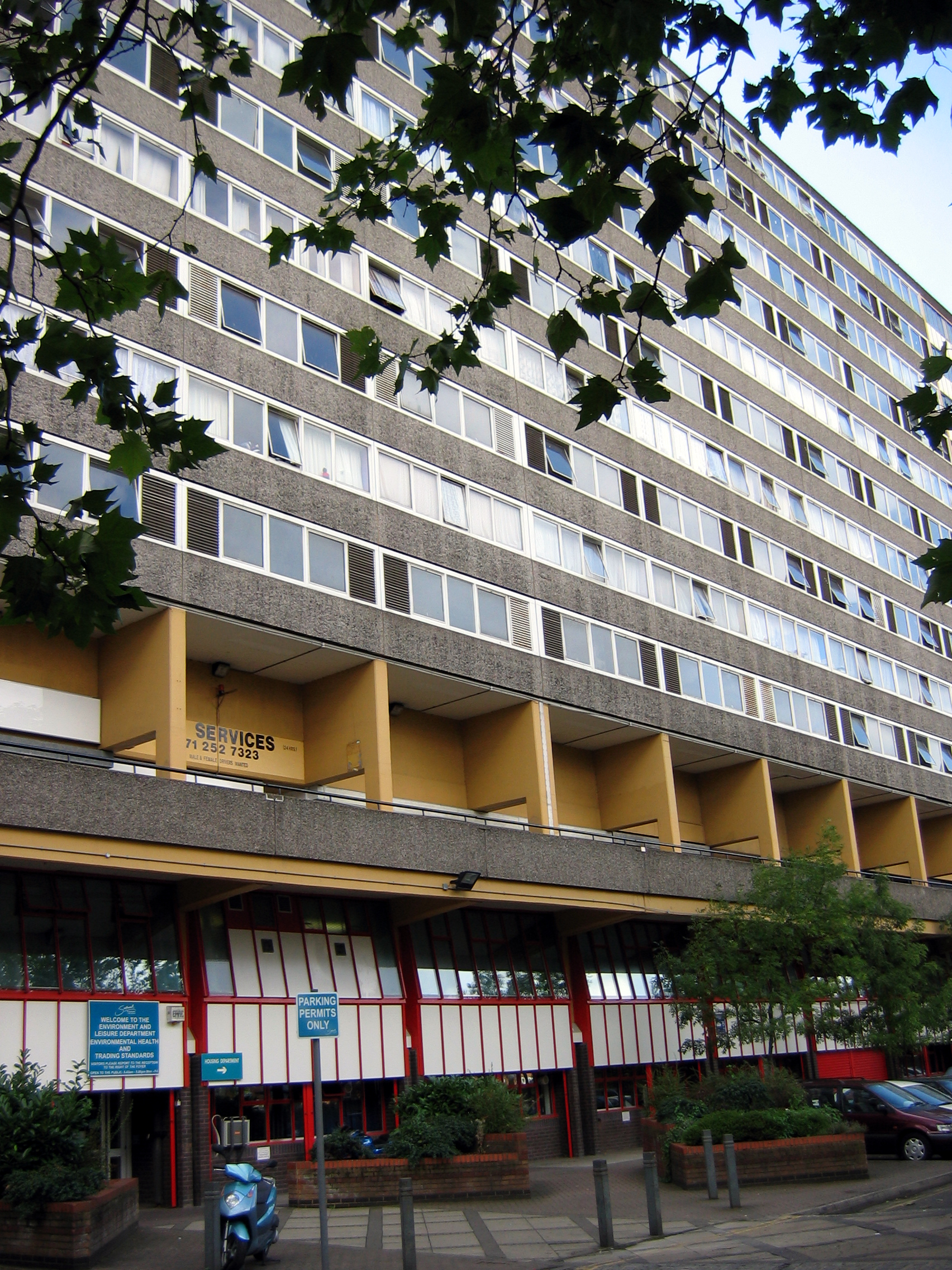
Taplow on Thurlow Street

However, as old tenants moved out and new tenants came in, the estate went through a period of decline in the 1980s. The area is now considered to be in the bottom category on the ACORN classification for inner city adversity, signifying an area of extremely high social disadvantage.

The buildings have been described as "poorly designed" by Labour Councillor Johnson Situ, and with constant problems and heating breakdowns as they near the end of their life.

In 1999 the estate was awarded New Deal for Communities status and given £56.2 million of central government funding (over 10 years). It was expected that this money would bring in £400 million of housing association funding into the estate as part of a stock transfer deal. A tenant ballot was held on transfer to a housing association which was rejected by 73% of the votes on a 73% tenant turnout.

== Regeneration ==
On 27 September 2005, the London Borough of Southwark decided that rather than spend £350 million updating the estate to basic living standards, it would order its demolition and replace the dwellings with modern houses controlled by a housing association. The plan involves increasing the density of housing from the current 2,700 units to 4,900. 2,288 units would remain social housing and the remainder would be for sale. The sale of these units is planned to fund the whole scheme.

The regeneration of the Aylesbury Estate has been divided into several phases which will see the estate being re-built in 20 years. The indicative phasing plan states when tenants plan to be re-housed and when leasehold properties would be bought by Southwark Council. However, this timetable is subject to a certain amount of flux, until the development partner is appointed and the more detailed scheduling of the work can begin, which will offer greater certainty to residents about when they will need to move.

The first Phase 1a was completed in August 2013, it lies near the south-west corner of the Aylesbury Estate and is divided into four development sites: A, C, B/E and D. This phase was developed with the L&Q housing association. It comprises 261 units, and a new resource centre for adults with disabilities. It is a mixture of affordable and private housing, with existing Aylesbury residents given priority to move into the new buildings.

The first stage of Phase 2, also known as Plot 18, includes 300–313 Missenden, 57–76 Northchurch and the space to the south of Taplow. The second stage of Phase 2 includes all the Wendover, Wolverton, Winslow, Padbury, Ravenstone and Foxcote blocks as well as Brockley House. Demolition of the blocks on Plot 18 started in 2017 and over 1,000 new homes were due to be built across this phase over the next seven years.

Phase 3 includes all Taplow and Northchurch blocks to the west of Thurlow Street as well as 184 and 218 East Street. Demolition of the existing blocks was programmed to start in 2021 and 200 new homes were due to be built in this phase over the next six years.

Phase 4 includes all the Missenden, Michael Faraday, Gayhurst, Gaitskell, Latimer, Calverton, Danesfield and Emberton blocks. It also includes Chadwell House, Lees House, Soane House, Dorwell House and 51–67 Inville Road. Demolition of the existing blocks was programmed to start in 2023 with over 1,500 new homes due to be built over the next nine years.

== Demolition ==
Overview:

- Client: Notting Hill Housing (NHH) + London and Quadrant Housing Association
- Architect: HTA Design LLP
- Demolition Contractors: Keltbray Ltd (Initial Stages), Erith Contractors Ltd (First Development Site demolition contract)
- Building Contractors: Notting Hill Genesis (First Development Site Package A construction, Approved Premises Facility construction), Vistry (Plot 18 construction contract)
- Area: 221,000 sq. m
- Reason for Demolition: End of service life and poor energy efficiency
- Future Plan: Phased mixed-use redevelopment including residential units, retail space, community use, medical centre, early years facility and workspace

As part of the pre-demolition works starting August 2015, Keltbray Ltd has been contracted as the demolition contractor to carry out the initial stages.

For the first development site demolition, works are carried out by a specialist demolition company, Erith Contractors Ltd. According to the Aylesbury Regeneration Newsletter, a top-down demolition method is adopted with machines working on top of the building. Scaffolding and Monaflex (the white scaffold sheeting) is used one floor at a time as the demolition progresses. This reduces dust and noise levels. The sequence of works programme which began from March 2020 to July 2020 included demolition of 1–172 Chiltern, demolition of the link bridge on Portland Street, and finally removal of obstruction and foundation.

As construction continues, demolition work is also included in the works programme under the building contractor. Starting spring 2021, Vistry, which is the Plot 18 contractor, is responsible for the demolition of Northchurch and Section 278. The estimated completion time is 13 weeks. Works included barriers and road sweepers on site, water for any dish suppression, hoarding around Northchurch and traffic marshals guiding traffic. Standard monitoring included dust and noise levels in compliance to construction trigger levels.

== Criticism ==
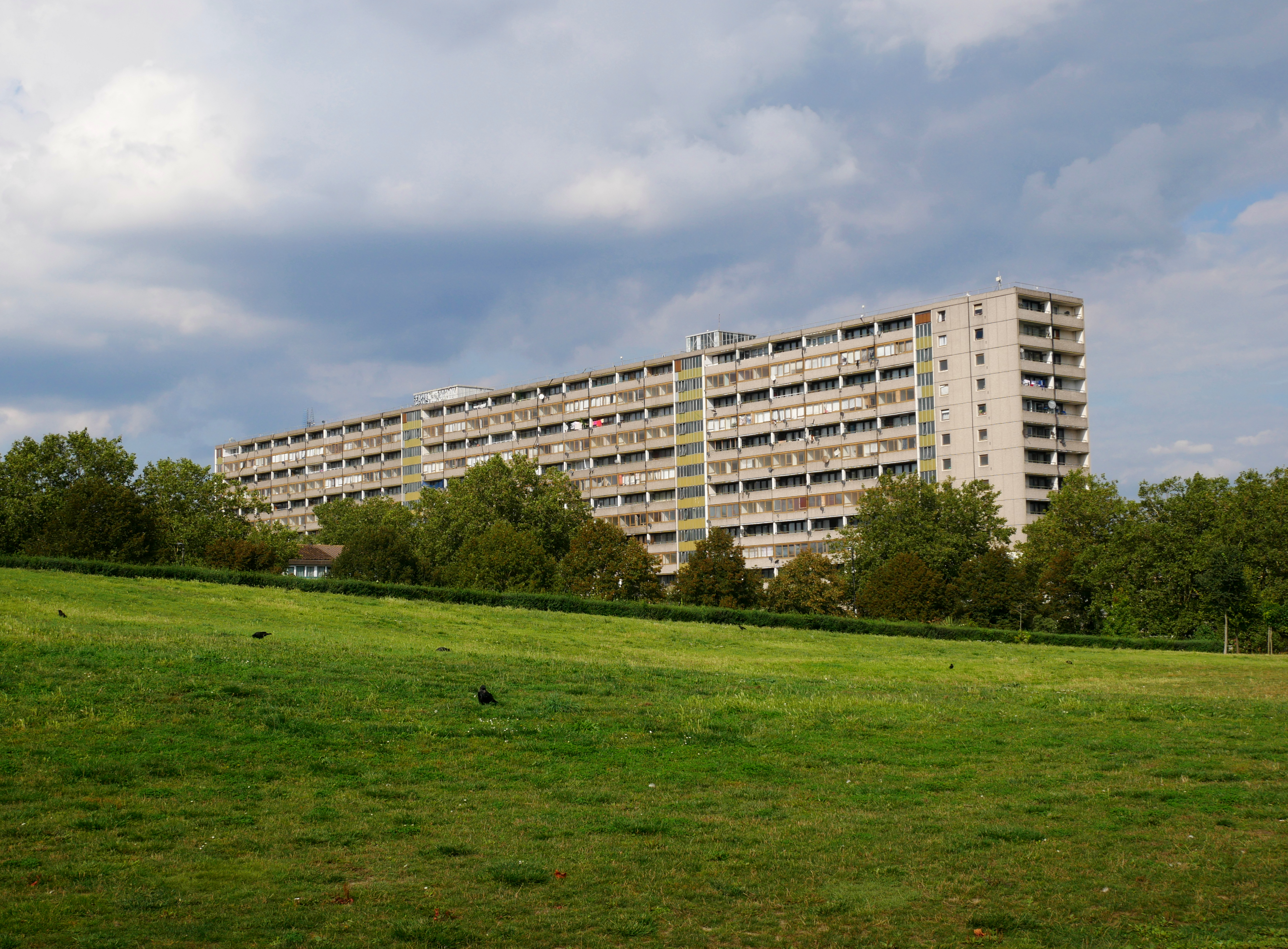
Part of the Aylesbury Estate as seen from Burgess Park

The NSP described the Aylesbury estate as "characterised by large concrete slab buildings built in the mid-1960s–70s, now at the end of their service life."

This drew criticism from residents, leading to a change of wording. Further objections during the EIP hearing, argued that the Council had submitted no evidence supporting the claim that the estate was at the end of its service life and had failed to investigate whether refurbishment could be a more viable and sustainable option. This was contrasted to Southwark's decision to bail out Notting Hill Genesis housing, at a cost of over £200 million, after the housing association failed to deliver the First Development site, evidently hit with financial viability problems.

Successful examples of the refurbishment of estates built using the same system as the Aylesbury can be found on the Six Acres estate in Islington and the Doddington estate in Battersea.

== Occupation ==
In January 2015, following the March for Homes, a block on the estate was occupied by a group of squatters and housing activists in a protest against the demolition of the estate and the gentrification of London. Despite facing resistance from the police and security guards the occupation continued, shifting from block to block as the protesters faced eviction notices. The occupation gained press attention for its tactics and for the counter measures taken by Southwark Council—who installed security guards, security dogs, and a spiked fence to deter protesters.

In March 2021, it had been reported that vacant properties in the low rises were being taken over by squatters because of inadequate police security. In addition, many residents are suffering from long-standing heating and hot water outages and leaks in their homes.

== In popular culture ==
External videos
- "Aylesbury Estate – Ident". Remake of the 'infamous' Channel 4 ident shot on Aylesbury Estate, London SE17. (Flash Video.)

The estate has featured in many television shows including The Bill, Spooks, and from 2004 to 2015 was featured in a Channel 4 ident, in which the camera "tracks down rubbish-strewn balconies [while] other balconies and floating concrete structures shift into place forming the shape of the Channel 4 logo." The washing lines, shopping trolley, rubbish bags and satellite dishes were, however, "all artificial embellishments added in by film-makers" to assist in what Ben Campkin, former director of the UCL Urban Laboratory, called the estate's depiction as "a desolate concrete dystopia [which] provides visual confirmation of tabloid journalists' descriptions of a 'ghost town' estate." The ident was also the first and last of its respective series to be broadcast. According to a report by The Guardian, the residents of the Aylesbury estate were tired of having their community portrayed in a poor light for decades.

In January 2014, Creation, a development trust for the estate, released a remake of the ident, produced and directed by Nick Street, and launched a campaign to persuade Channel 4 to use it instead of the original. Charlotte Benstead, a director at Creation, said:

For years it was the first port of call for directors, producers and location scouts looking for grim backdrops to murder scenes, gun and drug storylines and gang-related crimes in soaps and gritty dramas. Due to pressure from local residents, Southwark council banned filming on the estate, but the ident continues to be aired regularly. All these representations have perpetuated the reputation of the estate... We felt we needed to record an alternative and more truthful version of the clip. We worked with film-maker Nick Street to make our own version that looks beyond the concrete exterior.

In February 2014, Channel 4 told BBC London that it had "viewed the new film, liked it and has been in contact with the filmmaker about running it once. However the broadcaster said it would not be dropping the original ident."

== Transport ==
=== Buses ===
The estate is served by London Buses routes 42, 136 and 343. Routes 12, 35, 40, 45, 68, 148, 171, 176, 468 and P5 run nearby.

=== London Underground ===
The nearest station is Elephant & Castle on the Bakerloo and Northern lines.

=== National Rail ===
The adjacent Elephant & Castle railway station is served by Thameslink trains.

== Notable residents ==
- British rapper Tinie Tempah lived on the Aylesbury Estate until the age of 12.
- Footballer Reiss Nelson was raised in the area.

== See also ==
- Ferrier Estate
- Heygate Estate
