= Transport UK London Bus =

Bus company in Greater London

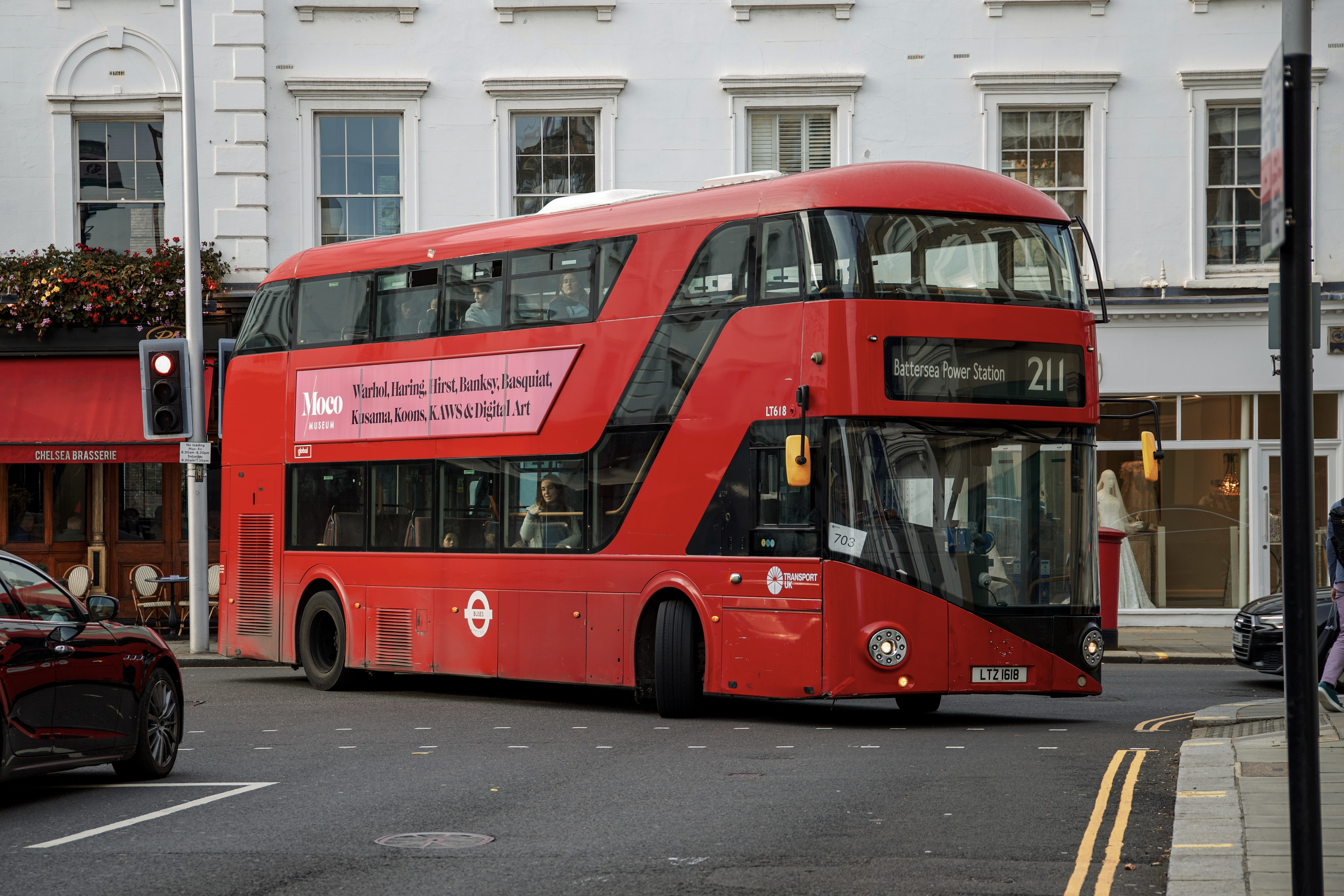
- New Routemaster on route 211 in October 2024
- Parent: Transport UK Group
- Founded: 21 May 2009; 17 years ago (as Abellio London)
- Headquarters: Camberwell
- Service area: Greater London; Surrey
- Service type: Bus services
- Routes: 80
- Depots: 6
- Fleet: 848
- Website: www.transportukbus.com

Transport UK London Bus, formerly Abellio London, is a bus company operating in Greater London and parts of Surrey. It is a subsidiary of Transport UK Group and operates services under contract to Transport for London.

== History ==
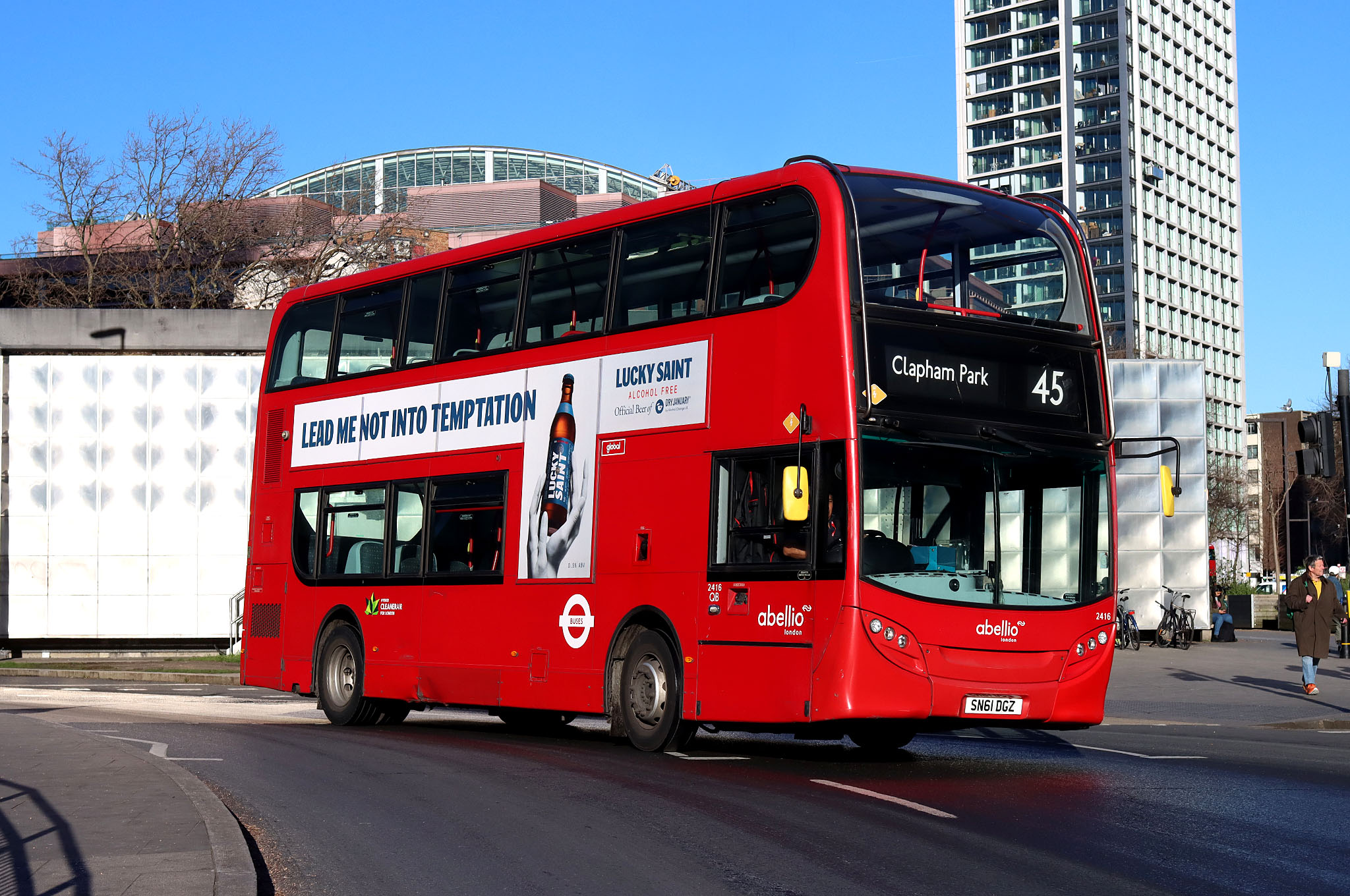
Abellio London Alexander Dennis Enviro400H on route 45 in Elephant and Castle in January 2024

The origins of Transport UK London Bus can be traced back to June 1998, when National Express commenced operating routes C1 and 211 under the Travel London brand. In August 2000, National Express sold the business to Limebourne, who in July 2001 sold out to Connex. In February 2004, National Express repurchased the business. Travel London operated contracts on behalf of Transport for London (TfL).

On 21 May 2009, National Express sold Travel London to Abellio. The sale included 36 TfL-tendered services. All vehicles, depots and staff were included. On 30 October 2009 the business was rebranded as Abellio London.

Abellio London was included in the sale of Abellio's United Kingdom businesses to Transport UK Group in February 2023. The new group began the process of rebranding Abellio London to Transport UK London Bus from early 2024, with the rebrand officially taking effect from 2 March 2024.

== Depots ==
Transport UK London Bus operates their TfL routes from six garages. Beddington, Battersea and Walworth are operated by Transport UK London Bus Limited and Twickenham, Southall and Hayes by Transport UK West London Bus Limited.

=== Southall (GW) ===
Southall garage operates routes 195, 207, 427, 482, 618, 969, E5, E7, E10, E11, H28 and N207.

=== Battersea (QB) ===
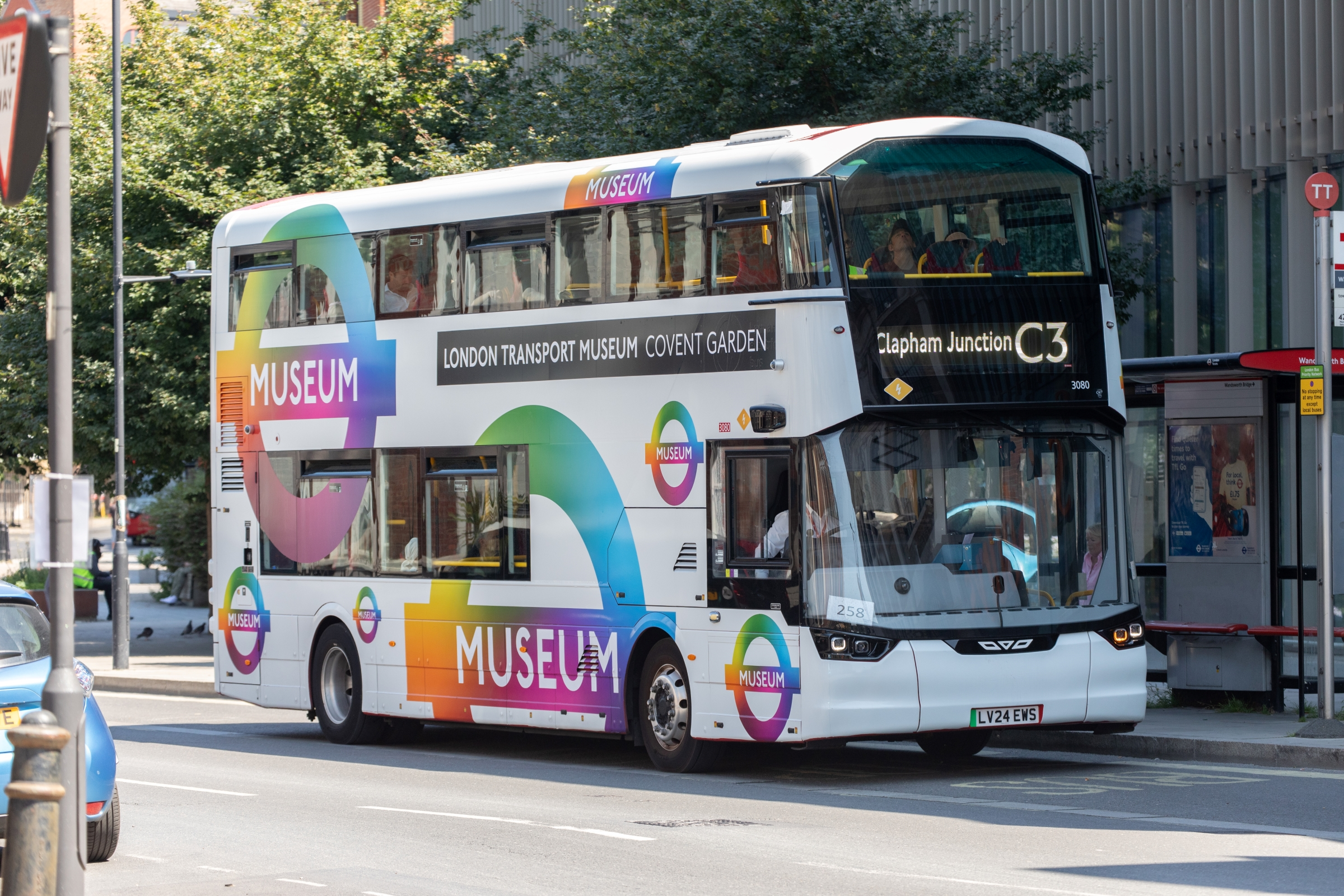
Wright StreetDeck Electroliner on route C3, wearing an advertising wrap for the London Transport Museum, in July 2024

Battersea garage operates routes 24, 27, 133, 156, 159, 211, 306, 337, 344, 345, 378, 415, 485, C3, G1, N27 and N133.

This garage was established by Q-Drive in the late 1990s, hence the QB code. Travel London's original bus garage was situated further north towards Stewarts Lane railway depot which was the home of the Gatwick Express, a rail franchise then operated by its parent National Express. Connex moved into these premises after purchasing the Limebourne business in July 2001. In December 2015, Battersea garage started operating route 159.

=== Beddington (BC) ===
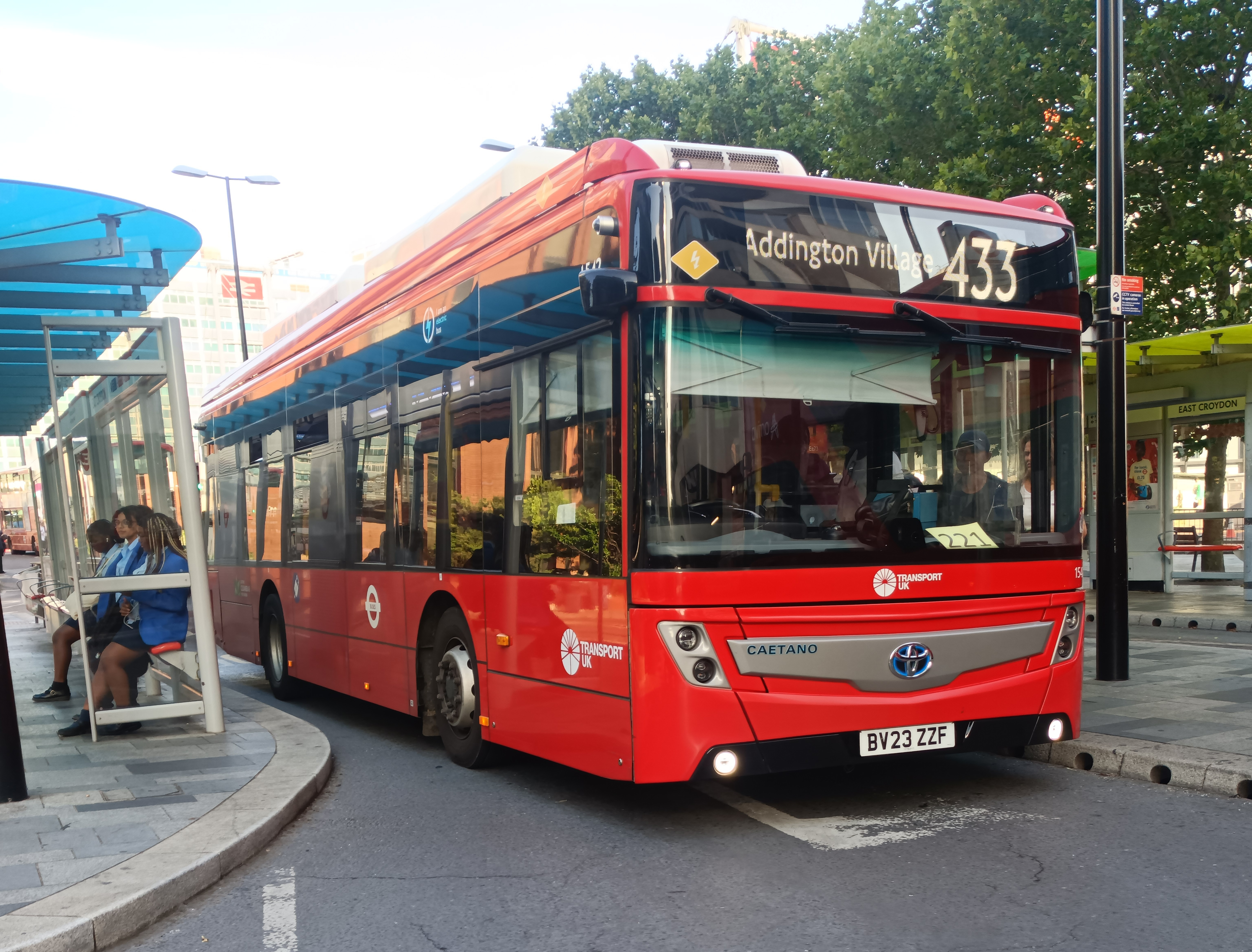
Caetano e.City Gold on route 433 at East Croydon station in July 2025

Beddington garage operates routes 109, 119, 130, 201, 270, 315, 359, 367, 404, 407, 433, 464, 493, 639, 645, 655, 664, 670, 690, N109, S1 and S3.

=== Hayes (DH) ===
Hayes garage operates routes 278, 350, E6, U5, U7 and U9.

=== Twickenham (TF) ===
Twickenham garage operates routes 111, 267, 285, 465, 490, H20, H25, H26, R68 and R70. On 2 October 2021, route 290 passed to London United. Brand new Wright GB Kite Electroliners were first noted on route R70 on 12 March 2024.

=== Walworth (WL) ===
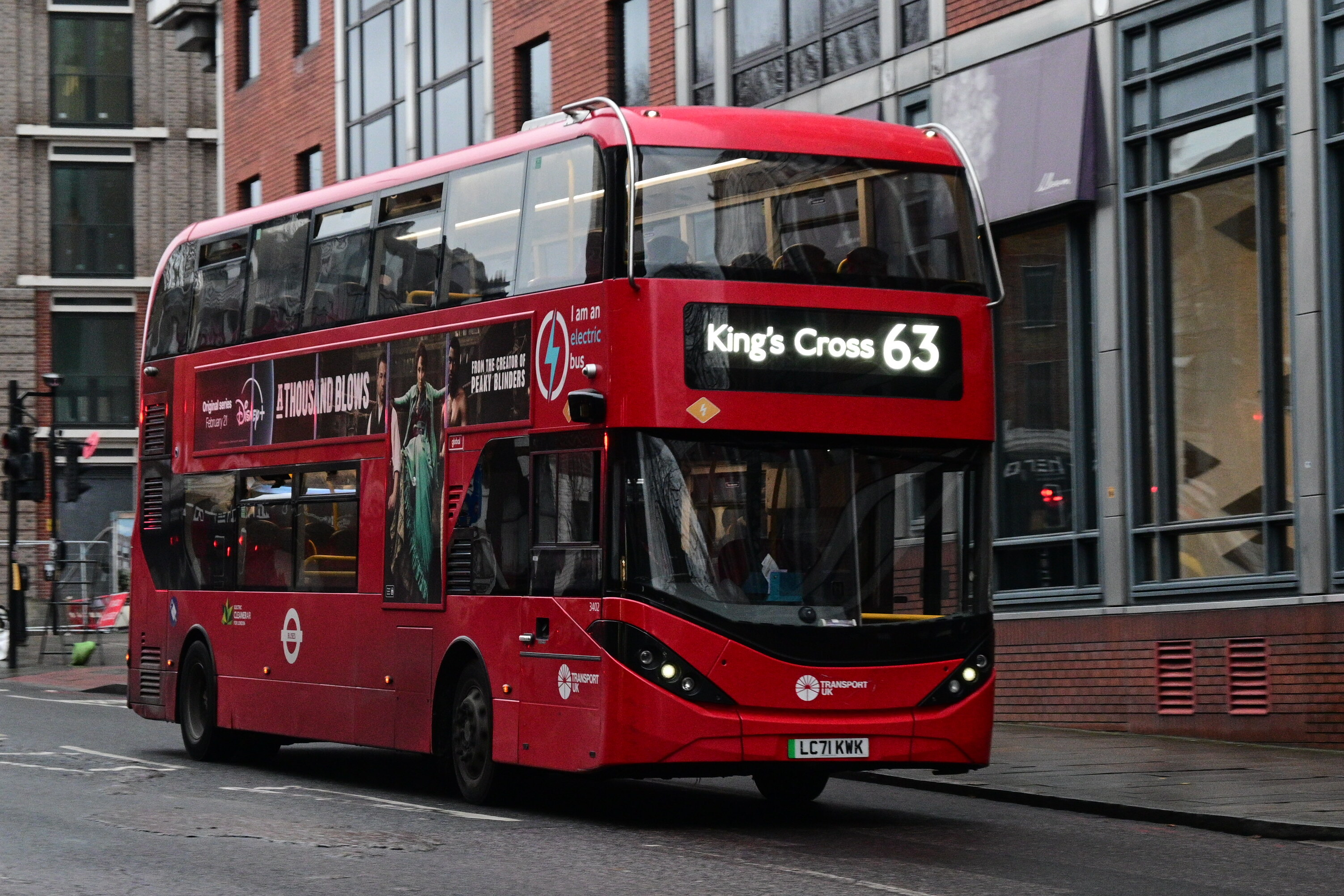
BYD Alexander Dennis Enviro400EV on route 63 on Farringdon Road in February 2025

Walworth garage operates routes 3, 45, 63, 68, 363, 381, C10, P5, P13, N3, N63, N68 and N381.

Originally a site acquired by the London County Council for its electric trams, it was known as Camberwell Tram depot until 1950, when its name was changed to Walworth to accommodate the arrival of motor buses replacing the garage's tram fleet, as well to avoid confusion with Camberwell garage, located opposite this garage. Major rebuilding took place during the 1950s to repair bomb damage from World War II, during which time some buses were worked out of Camberwell.

In the late 1960s, the garage assumed operation of the Red Arrow routes, using AEC Merlins and later Leyland Nationals on the service until the garage was closed in 1985. Following the closure of the Victoria and Ash Grove garages, from 1987 Walworth was reopened to operate the Red Arrow routes for a short time until the new Waterloo garage was ready.

During the early 1990s, the garage once again re-opened, this time for the Londonlinks operation of routes 78 and 176. The Cowie Group undertook a major restructure a few years later, which once again saw closure of Walworth garage in 1997.

The garage lay dormant on lease by Go-Ahead Group for six years until late 2003, when work started on refurbishing the garage for Travel London following contract gains for routes in South London. When reopened on 24 February 2005 by Mayor of London Ken Livingstone, it was the first bus garage in London to be powered with solar panels.

== Former depots ==
=== Southall (AB) ===
Southall garage opened on 29 July 2017, when routes E1, E5, E7 and E9 were transferred from Hayes. It was replaced by a new site on Armstrong Way in July 2019.

=== Hayes (WS) ===
This garage closed in late 2021, transferring its routes to Southall (GW) garage. Hayes garage used to operate and hold London bus routes 278, 350, 482, H28, U5, U7 and U9. It moved to a new site on Dawley Road in 2021.

== Fleet ==
As of March 2024, Transport UK London Bus operates a fleet of 848 buses.
