= Elephant & Castle station =

Elephant & Castle station may refer to one of two stations located in Elephant and Castle, London:

- Elephant & Castle railway station - a National Rail station
- Elephant & Castle tube station - a London Underground station
