= London Buses route 433 =

London bus route

433
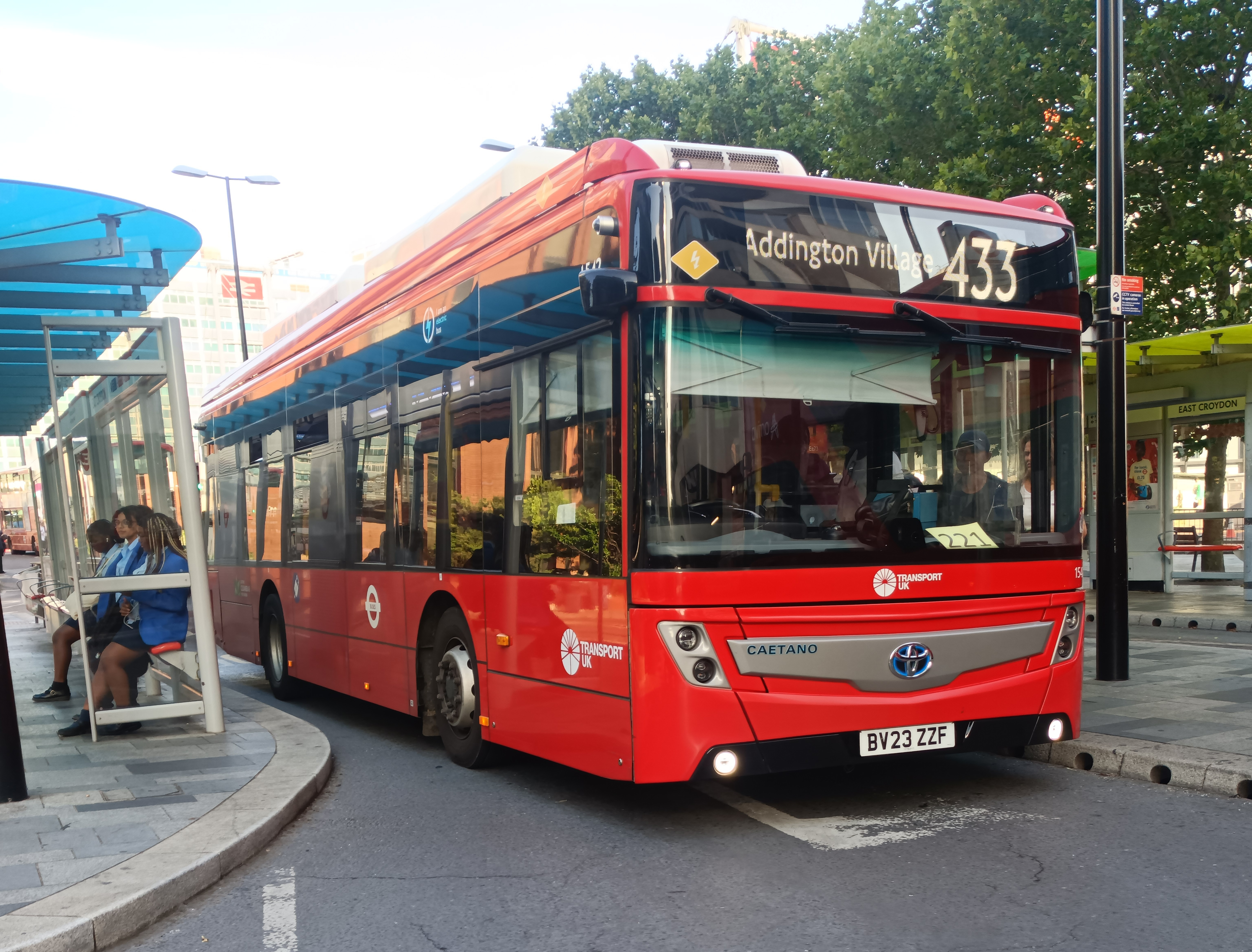
- Transport UK London Bus Caetano e.City Gold at East Croydon station in July 2025

Overview
- Operator: Transport UK London Bus
- Garage: Beddington
- Vehicle: Wright GB Kite Electroliner
- Peak vehicle requirement: 8
- Predecessors: Route T33
- Night-time: No night service

Route
- Start: Addington Village Interchange
- Via: Forestdale; Selsdon; South Croydon
- End: Croydon town centre
- Length: 7 miles (11 km)

Service
- Level: Daily
- Frequency: About every 8-15 minutes
- Journey time: 23-38 minutes
- Operates: 05:30 until 00:47

London Buses route 433 is a Transport for London contracted bus route in London, England. Running between Addington Village Interchange and Croydon town centre, it is operated by Transport UK London Bus.

== History ==
The route was created as a "Tram feeder" service with the opening of Tramlink in 2000. It was numbered T33. In 2015, the route was renumbered 433 as part of wider changes that also saw the withdrawal of routes T31 and T32.

In July 2018, service frequencies at all times were reduced. On 2 November 2019, the route was changed to terminate in Croydon town centre instead of West Croydon bus station.

In 2021, Abellio London announced that they intended to introduce Caetano e.City Golds on the route.

== Current route ==
Route 433 operates via these primary locations:

- Addington Village Interchange
- Forestdale
- Selsdon
- South Croydon station
- East Croydon station
- Croydon town centre
