= Caetano City Gold =

Low-floor single-decker bus bodywork produced since 1997

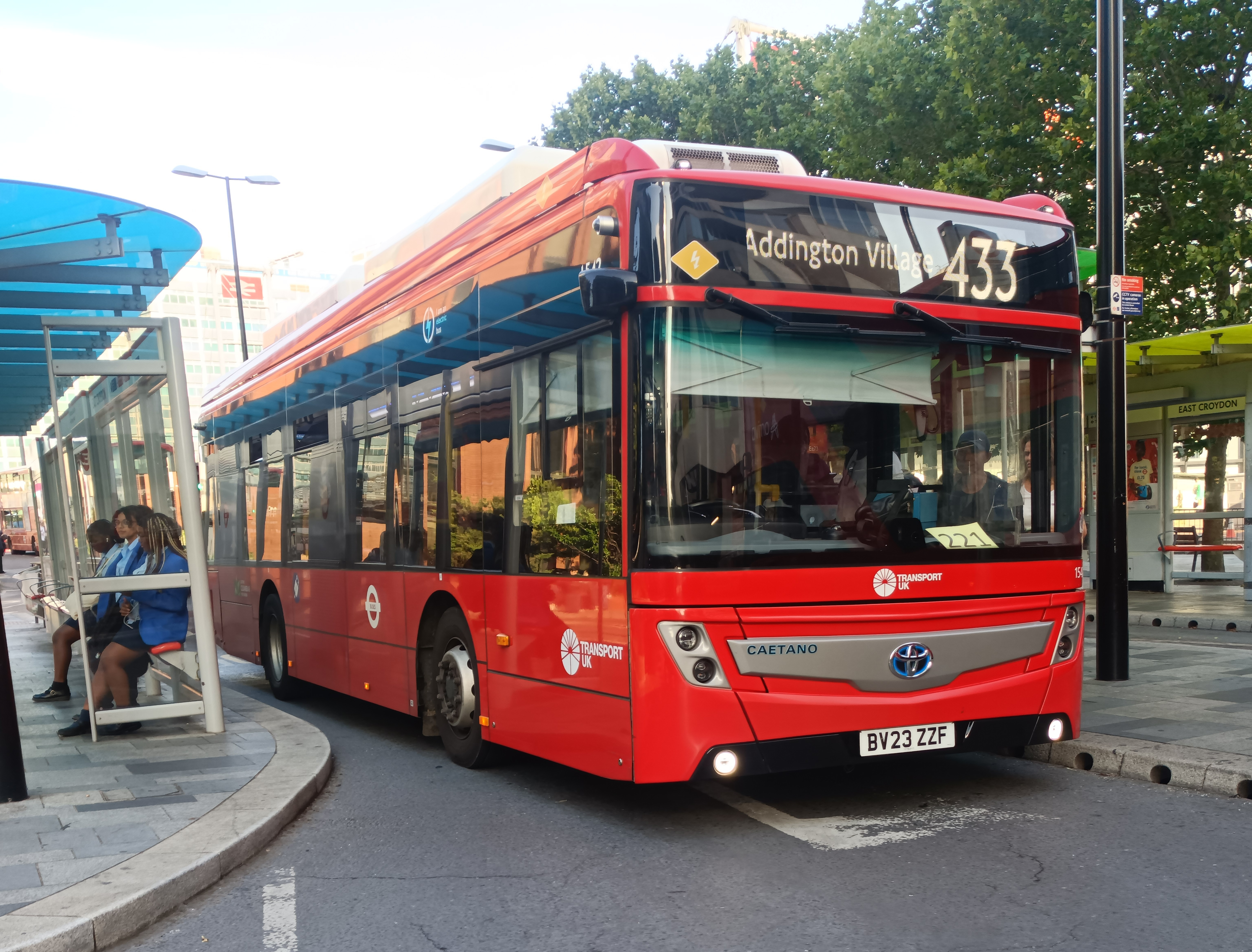
- A Caetano e.City Gold operated by Transport UK London Bus

Overview
- Manufacturer: Salvador Caetano
- Production: 1997–
- Assembly: Vila Nova de Gaia, Portugal

Body and chassis
- Class: Single-decker bus
- Layout: Rear-engine, rear-wheel drive
- Doors: 1, 2 or 3
- Floor type: Low-floor
- Chassis: Diesel engine: MAN 14.240; MAN NLxx3F; Mercedes-Benz O405N; Scania K230UB; Volvo B7RLE; Volvo B9LA (articulated); Compressed natural gas: MAN 18.270; Hydrogen fuel cell: Toyota Sora; Full electric: Caetano integral chassis

Powertrain
- Electric motor: Siemens permanent magnet synchronous
- Capacity: 100 to 385 kWh
- Power output: 286 to 359 bhp (213 to 268 kW) (diesel); 272 to 310 bhp (203 to 231 kW) (CNG); 180 kW (240 bhp) (hydrogen, electric)
- Battery: Lithium–nickel–manganese–cobalt oxide packs
- Electric range: 190 mi (300 km) (electric); 250 mi (400 km) (hydrogen)
- Plug-in charging: CCS2 connector DC charging up to 150 kW; Pantograph charging up to 22 kW

Dimensions
- Wheelbase: 4.45 to 6.01 m (14.6 to 19.7 ft)
- Length: Rigid: 10.7 to 12 m (35 to 39 ft); Articulated: 18 m (59 ft)
- Width: 2.55 m (8.4 ft)
- Height: 3.15 to 3.46 m (10.3 to 11.4 ft)

Chronology
- Predecessor: Caetano Nimbus

The Caetano City Gold is a series of low-floor, single-decker bus bodywork designs produced by Salvador Caetano since 1997. As of 2022, the City Gold has been launched with diesel, compressed natural gas (CNG), hydrogen fuel cell and full electric powertrains.

== History ==
The first vehicles in the City Gold range entered service in Barcelona in 1997; these were constructed on Mercedes-Benz O405N chassis, featuring Mercedes' own front end design. These were followed by examples constructed on MAN NLxx3F chassis, featuring MAN's own front end design.

Then in 2012, the City Gold range was launched in right-hand drive markets for the first time, with the launch of the CitySmart midibus on MAN 14.240 diesel-powered chassis in the United Kingdom. With the cessation of production of the MCV Evolution and Plaxton Centro and with Alexander Dennis no longer willing to provide the ADL Enviro200 on MAN chassis, the CitySmart was at this time the only bodywork available for the 14.240, which otherwise would have exited the British market at this point. A single demonstration vehicle was completed in April 2012 and registered by MAN Truck & Bus at their Swindon dealership.

== Operators ==
=== Mainland Europe ===
In 2010, five 18 metres (59 ft)-long articulated buses constructed on Volvo B9LA chassis entered service with STCP in Porto. The diesel-powered City Gold on MAN and Mercedes chassis has proven most popular with operators in Barcelona, Lisbon and Porto.

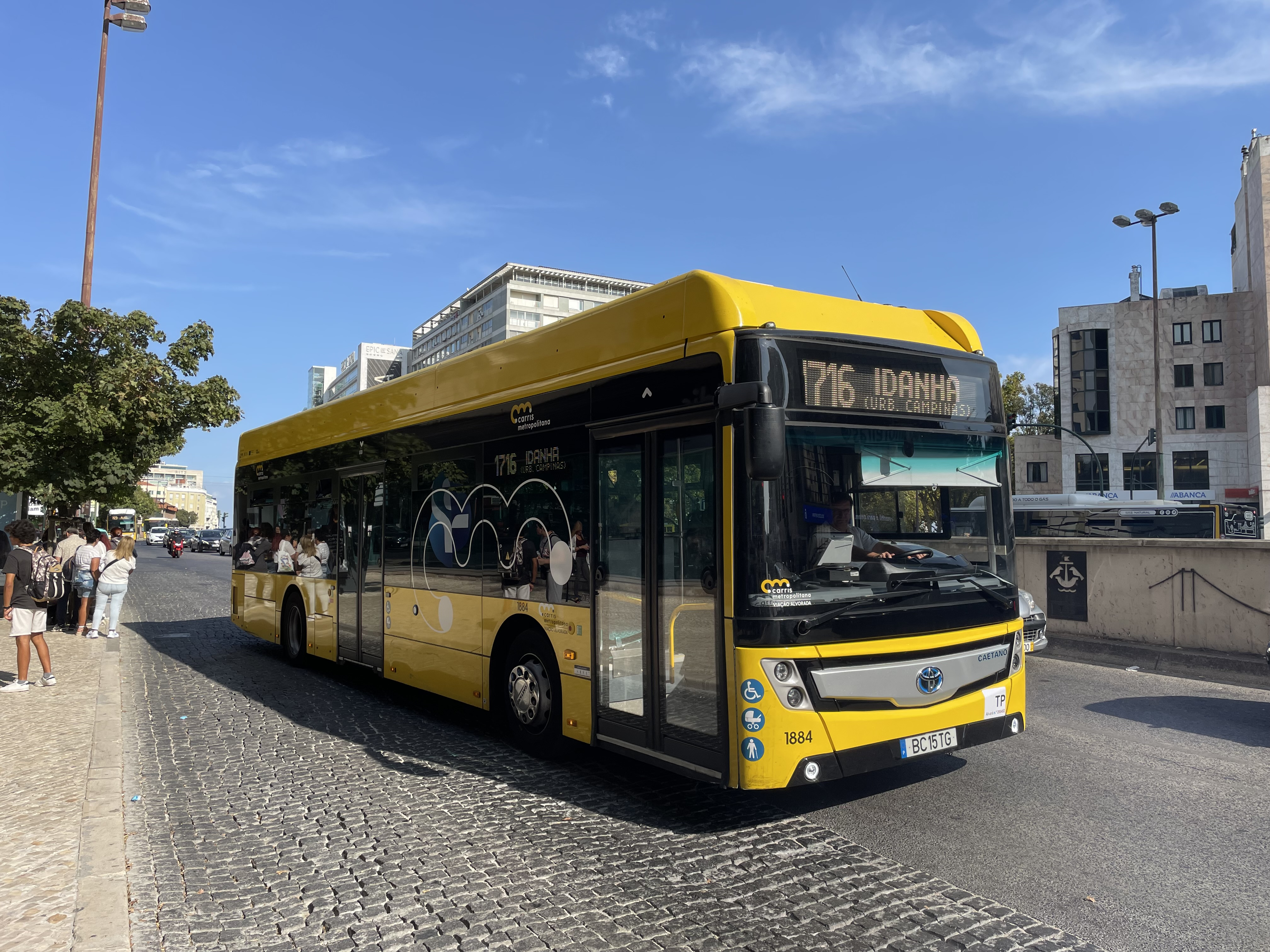
A Caetano e.City Gold operated by Viação Alvorada for Carris Metropolitana

24 City Golds on diesel-powered Volvo B7RLE chassis entered service with Carris in Lisbon in 2009, followed later that year by a further 20 EcoCity buses on CNG-powered MAN NLxx3F chassis. Further example of the EcoCity, with facelifted bodywork to match the recently launched electric model, entered service in Lisbon and Porto between 2018 and 2021.

The hydrogen-powered H2.City Gold on CaetanoBus chassis has achieved numerous sales, predominantly in Germany as of 2022; examples have entered service in Bielefeld, Cottbus, Düren and Wiesbaden. In Barcelona, eight H2.City Golds entered service with TMB in 2020 followed by a further seven in 2022.

=== United Kingdom ===
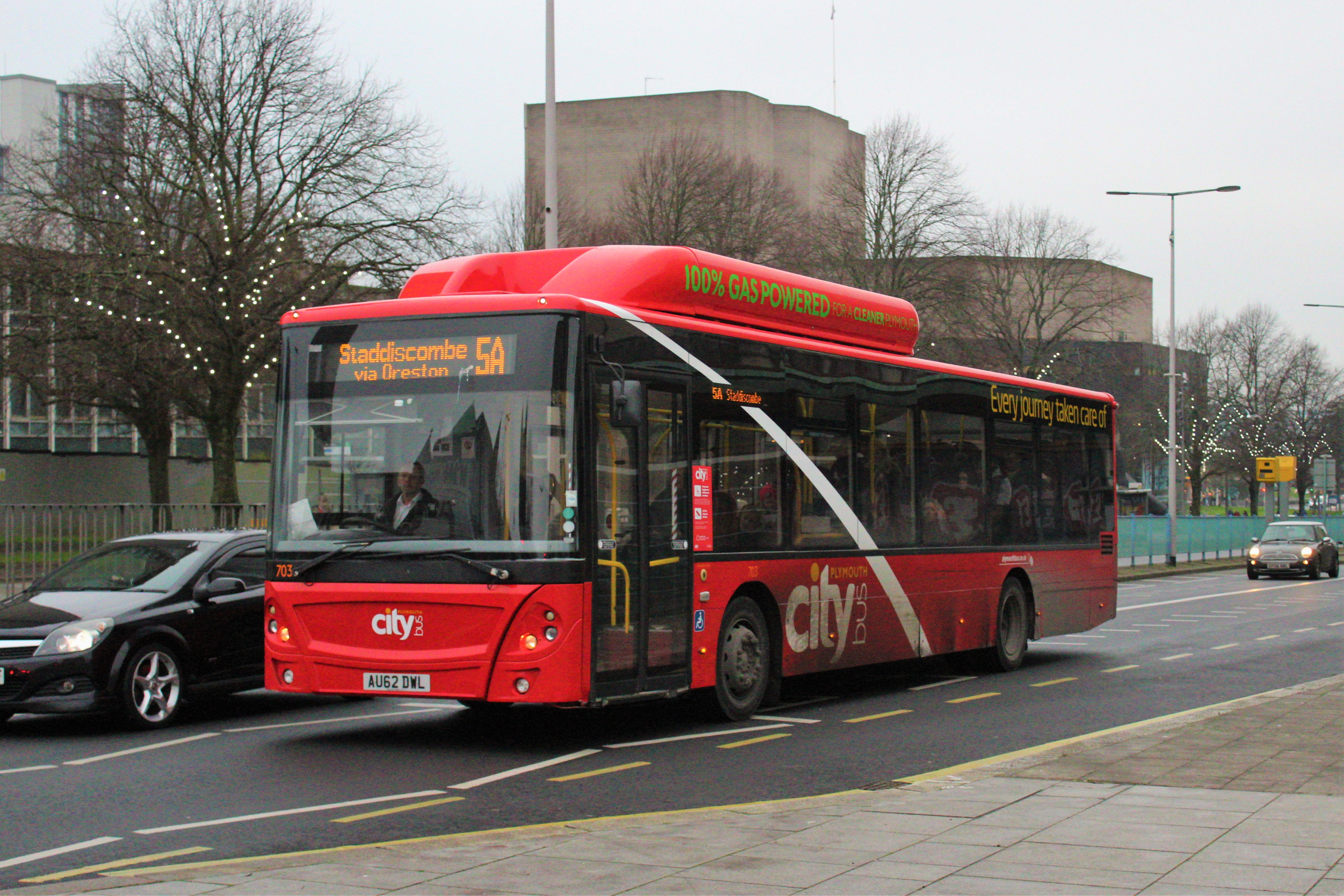
A 2013 Caetano EcoCity operated by Plymouth Citybus

South Wales-based New Adventure Travel was the first and only operator to order the newly launched CitySmart buses, who purchased the demonstration vehicle as well as nineteen additional brand new vehicles between May 2013 and July 2014.

Caetano subsequently launched the compressed natural gas-powered EcoCity on MAN 18.270 chassis in the United Kingdom in November 2012. A total of 44 EcoCity buses were produced for the British market before the model ceased to be available for this market in August 2017. Arriva UK Bus were the largest customer, primarily for their North East and North West subsidiaries. Anglian Bus, owned by the Go-Ahead Group, were the only other operator to purchase EcoCity buses; these vehicles were subsequently transferred to fellow Go-Ahead subsidiary Plymouth Citybus.

After a hiatus of several years, the City Gold range returned to the United Kingdom in 2020 with the launch of the integral, fully electric e.City Gold in right-hand drive markets. As of April 2023, 43 examples have been produced, 34 of which were delivered to Abellio London in summer 2020 for operation on routes C10 and P5 in 10.7 metres (35 ft) form. Eight more e.City Golds, which arrived in late 2022, entered service on route 433 in mid 2023.

A single hydrogen fuel cell-powered H2.City Gold vehicle on Toyota Sora chassis has been produced for the United Kingdom as a demonstration vehicle, although no orders have yet followed; Abellio London were among operators to trial this vehicle in 2020.

=== Hong Kong ===
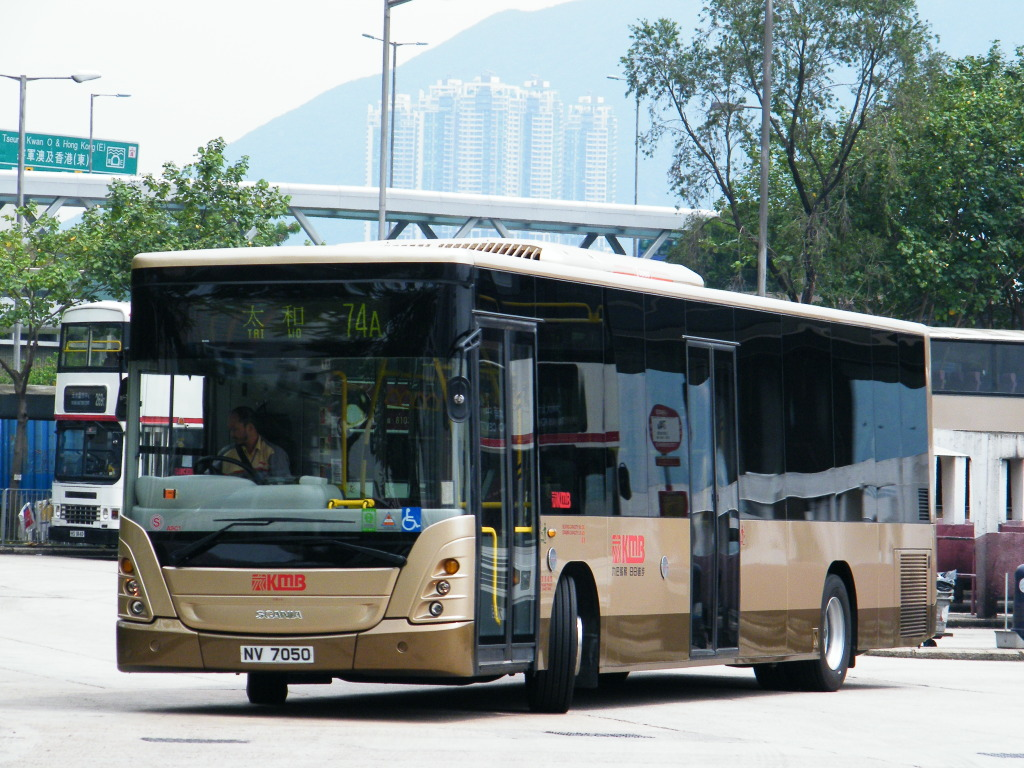
A 2009 City Gold operated by Kowloon Motor Bus

In 2009, 30 City Golds were constructed on Scania K230UB diesel chassis and exported to Hong Kong, entering service with Kowloon Motor Bus to complement their existing fleet of Caetano-bodied Scania double-decker buses. Of this batch of vehicles, 20 are 12 metres (39 ft) in length and the remaining ten are 10.6 metres (35 ft) in length. These remain the only City Golds to have been constructed on a Scania chassis.
