= London Buses route 59 =

London bus route

59
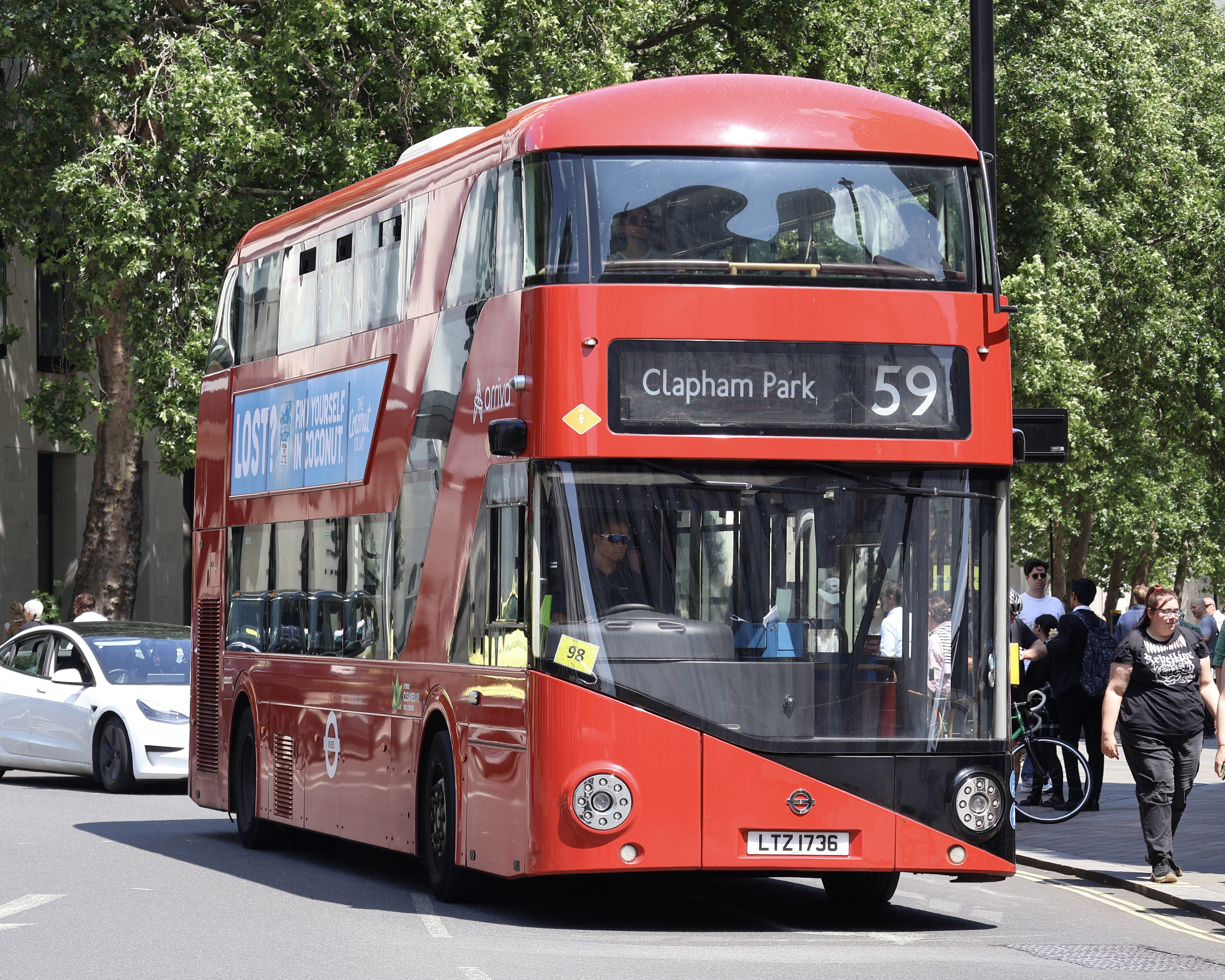
- Arriva London New Routemaster on the Strand in June 2025

Overview
- Operator: Arriva London
- Garage: Brixton
- Vehicle: New Routemaster

Route
- Start: St Bartholomew's Hospital
- Via: City Thameslink station Holborn; Waterloo; Kennington; Brixton
- End: Clapham Park

London Buses route 59 is a Transport for London contracted bus route in London, England. Running between St Bartholomew's Hospital and Clapham Park, it is operated by Arriva London.

== History ==
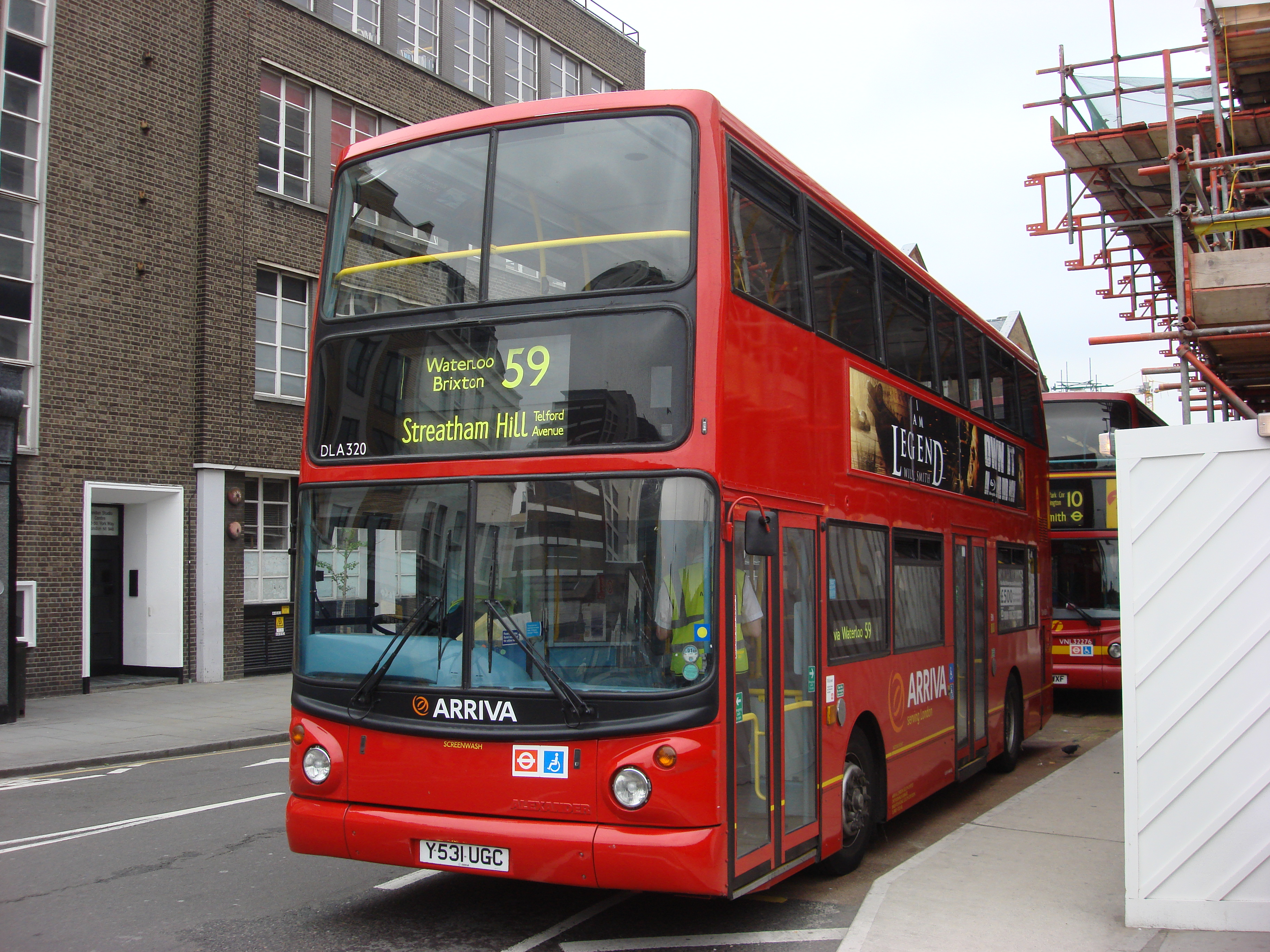
Arriva London Alexander ALX400 bodied DAF DB250 at King's Cross in June 2008

Route 59 was introduced in 1999 in order to replace part of route 109 and also provide a service between Streatham and Euston station. It was and still is contracted to Arriva London.

On 10 November 2007 the route was extended from Euston to King's Cross. The move, which was intended to provide a direct link between Waterloo and St Pancras stations, coincided with the relocation of the Eurostar terminal.

On 20 December 2013, thirty people were injured when the driver of a route 59 bus swerved to avoid a vehicle and hit a tree in Kennington. Seven people were seriously injured.

New Routemasters were introduced on 22 March 2016. The rear platform remains closed at all times except when the bus is at bus stops.

On 29 June 2019, the route was withdrawn between Euston and King's Cross.

On 23 November 2022, it was announced that route 59 would be rerouted to run to St Bartholomew's Hospital instead of Euston following a consultation. This change was implemented on 29 April 2023 with the withdrawal of the 521.

In September 2024, Transport for London launched a consultation proposing to modify the route to terminate at Clapham Park instead of Streatham Hill to replace route 45. In December 2024, it was confirmed that the changes would proceed and they were implemented on 1 February 2025.

== Current route ==
Route 59 operates via these primary locations:

- St Bartholomew's Hospital
- City Thameslink station
- Holborn Circus
- Chancery Lane station
- Holborn station
- Aldwych
- Waterloo station
- Lambeth North station
- Kennington
- Brixton station
- Clapham Park
