= Walworth =

District of South London, England

Coordinates: 51.4898°N 0.0905°W

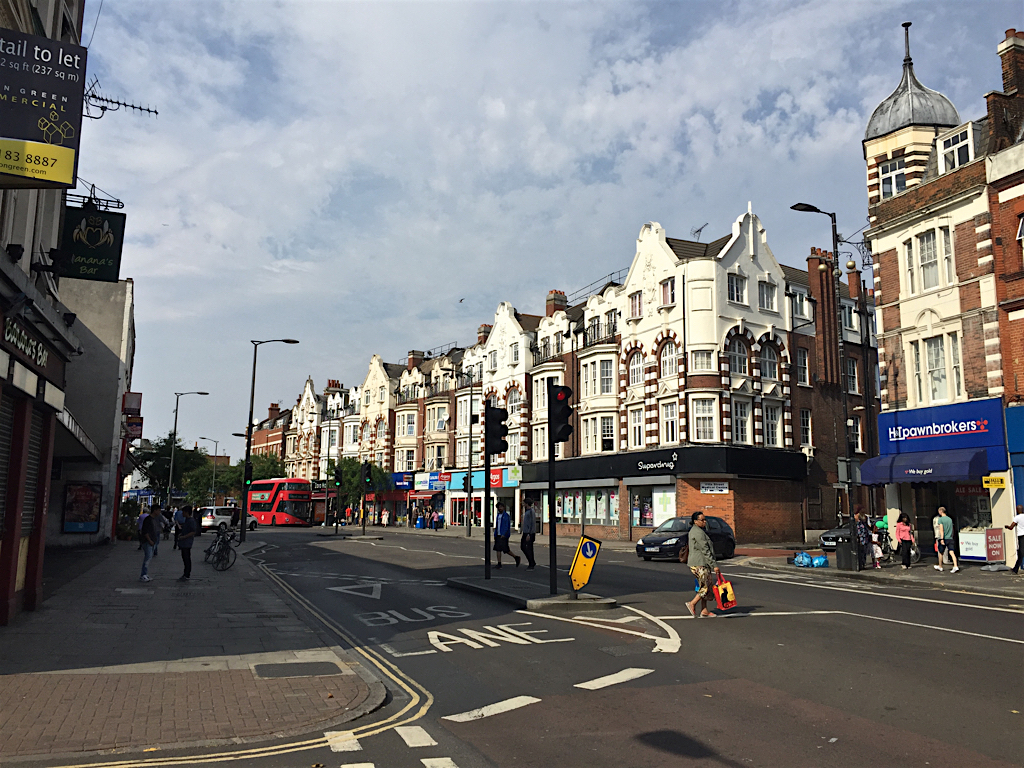

- Location within Greater London
- OS grid reference: TQ325785
- London borough: Southwark
- Ceremonial county: Greater London
- Region: London
- Country: England
- Sovereign state: United Kingdom
- Post town: LONDON
- Postcode district: SE1 (Old Kent Road), SE17
- Dialling code: 020
- Police: Metropolitan
- Fire: London
- Ambulance: London
- UK Parliament: Peckham; Vauxhall and Camberwell Green
- London Assembly: Lambeth and Southwark

Walworth (/ˈwɔːlwəθ/ WAWL-wərth) is a district of South London, England, within the London Borough of Southwark. It adjoins Camberwell to the south and Elephant and Castle to the north, and is 1.9 miles (3.1 km) south-east of Charing Cross.

Major streets in Walworth include the Old Kent Road, New Kent Road and Walworth Road.

== History ==
The name Walworth is probably derived from Old English Wealh "Briton" and the suffix -worth "homestead" or "enclosure" and, thus, "British farm".

Walworth appears in the Domesday Book of 1086 as Waleorde. It was held by Bainiard from Archbishop Lanfranc of Canterbury. Its domesday assets were: 3½ hides; one church, four ploughs, 8 acres (32,000 m^{2}) of meadow. It rendered £3.

Old industrial buildings on Horsley Street, part of the Aylesbury Estate in the background.

John Smith House is on Walworth Road, and was renamed in memory of John Smith, who was leader of the Labour Party from 1992 up to his sudden death in 1994. A former headquarters of the Labour Party, it was often seen in news reports at election times and in the background as people came and went from meetings of the Labour Party National Executive Committee. It was used by the London Borough of Southwark as the home for its education department and reopened in July 2012 as a hostel.

St Peter's Church, Walworth, built circa 1825, is an excellent example of the neo-classical style of church built by Sir John Soane. It is an indication of the wealth of the middle-class merchants who then lived in the vicinity that they could afford an architect of such prominence.

Manor Place Baths is a former wash house in Manor Place off Walworth Road. It is a grade II listed building. The building was renovated by Kagyu Samye Dzong, Tibetan Buddhist Centre who obtained a five-year lease in 2005. They opened it as their London centre, called Manor Place Samye Dzong on 17 March 2007. The Manor Place Baths are now home to an indoor skatepark owned by Nike in collaboration with Palace. Adjacent is the council's old recycling depot which is now closed and has been replaced by a new facility at 43 Devon Street, off Old Kent Road.

Walworth is also home to the Pullens buildings - a mixture of Victorian live/work spaces and yards. Many of the flats are one bedroom, and some of the flats still connect to the Workshops of any of the three yards (Illife Yard, Peacock Yard and one other).

Walworth also used to have a zoo, in Royal Surrey Gardens, which was visited by Queen Victoria.

== Politics ==
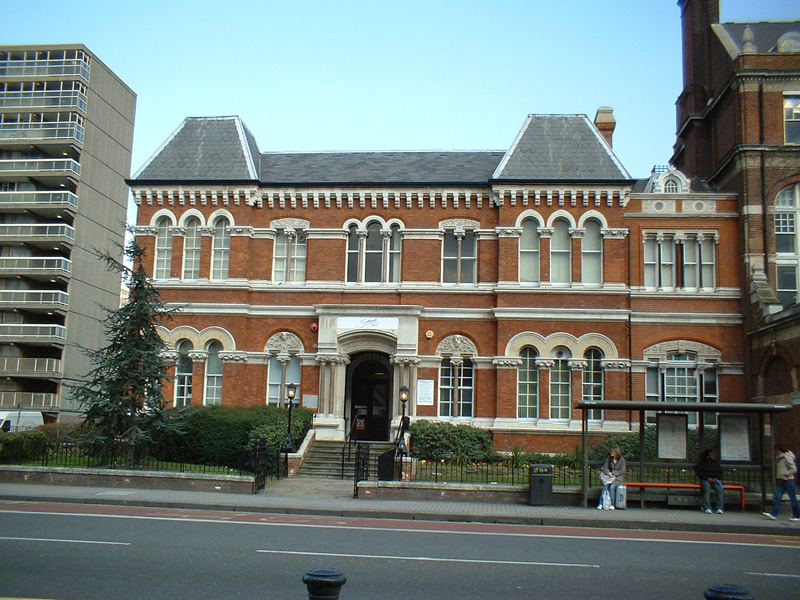
Walworth Town Hall

A map showing the wards of Southwark Metropolitan Borough as they appeared in 1916.

Walworth Town Hall, previously the Vestry Hall of St Mary, Newington, became the headquarters of the Metropolitan Borough of Southwark and was renamed "Southwark Town Hall" in 1900. It reverted to the name "Walworth Town Hall" when it ceased to be the local seat of government after the enlarged London Borough of Southwark was formed in 1965.

Walworth is part of the Vauxhall and Camberwell Green constituency for elections to the House of Commons of the United Kingdom.

Walworth is part of the North Walworth ward for elections to Southwark London Borough Council.

== Regeneration ==
Large amounts of regeneration and gentrification are occurring in Walworth, including the demolition of the Elephant and Castle Shopping Centre, the newly built Strata tower, the demolition and regeneration of the Heygate and Aylesbury Estates, and redevelopment of St Mary's Churchyard as a new park. The Bakerloo Line Extension is proposed with two new stations along Old Kent Road.

== Mentions in culture ==
The district of Walworth features in Charles Dickens’ Great Expectations; Mr Wemmick resides here in a small wooden cottage. Dickens also mentioned Walworth in “Sketches by Boz, The Black Veil”. Walworth is featured in the 2016 novel by Stella Duffy, London Lies Beneath, set in 1912. It is also featured in the 2017 film The Foreigner, as the restaurant of the protagonist Ngoc Minh Quan is based in this district.

Enda Walsh's 2006 play, The Walworth Farce, is set in a council flat near the Elephant & Castle. A theme of the play is Irish migration and immigration. Walworth had been a centre for Irish immigration since the nineteenth century.

== Notable residents ==
- Charles Babbage, polymath
- Fred Bason, diarist, bookseller, cartophilist and autograph hunter
- Robert Browning, poet and playwright
- Sir Charlie Chaplin, born 1889, actor and director
- Samuel Palmer, painter
- Frank Stubbs, recipient of the Victoria Cross, born 3 December 1888
- Charles Upfold, businessman
- The Walworth Jumpers, a 19th-century religious movement

== Transport and locale ==
=== Nearest places ===
- Newington
- Southwark
- Kennington
- Peckham
- Bermondsey
- Camberwell
- Lambeth
- Borough
- Elephant and Castle

=== Nearest underground stations ===
- Elephant & Castle (Bakerloo and Northern lines)
- Kennington (Northern line)

=== Nearest National Rail station ===
- Elephant & Castle
