= London Buses route 63 =

London bus route

63
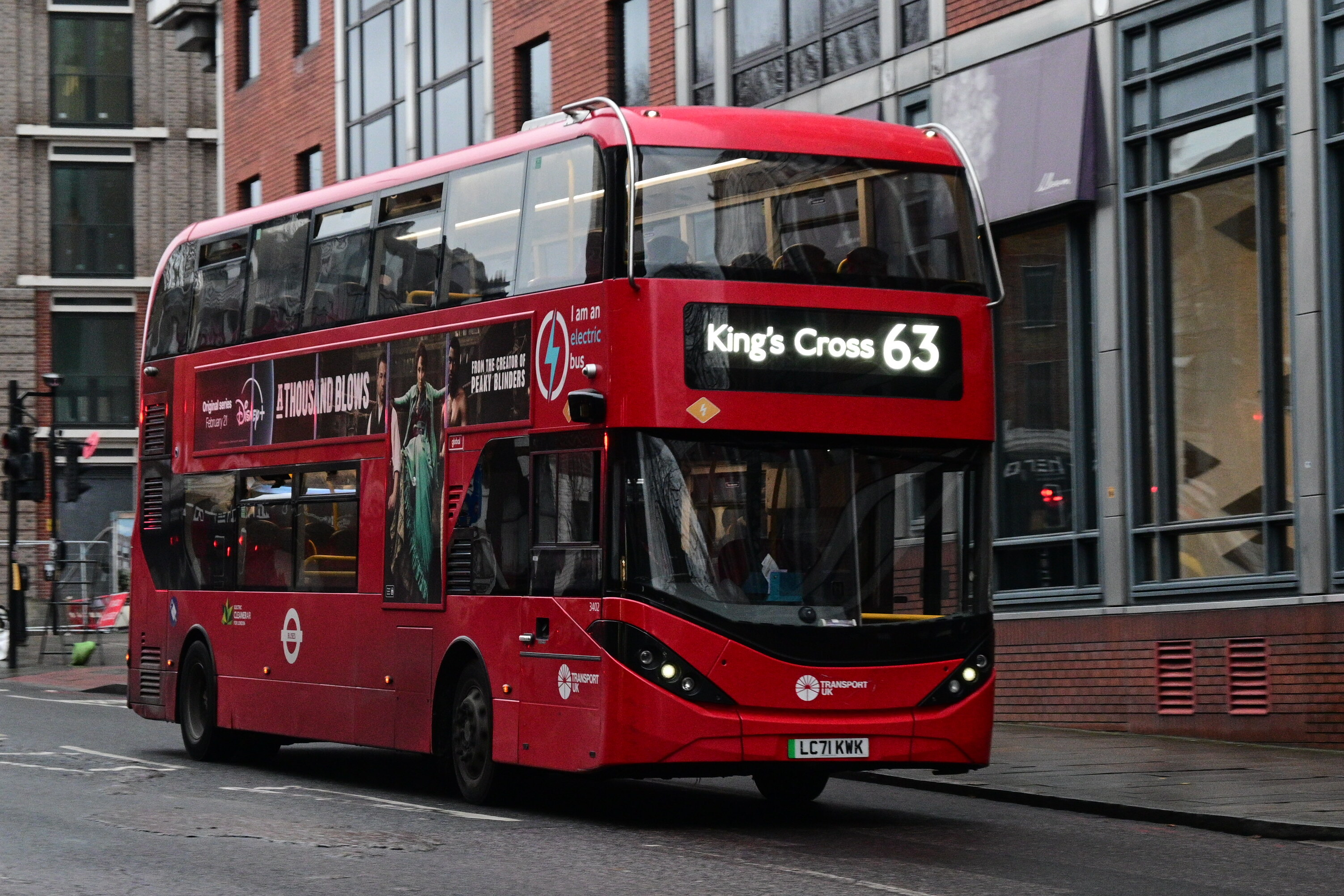
- Transport UK London Bus BYD Alexander Dennis Enviro400EV on Farringdon Road in February 2025

Overview
- Operator: Transport UK London Bus
- Garage: Walworth
- Vehicle: BYD Alexander Dennis Enviro400EV
- Former operator: London Central
- Night-time: N63

Route
- Start: King's Cross station
- Via: Ludgate Circus; Blackfriars; Elephant and Castle; Peckham
- End: Honor Oak

London Buses route 63 is a Transport for London contracted bus route in London, England. Running between King's Cross station and Honor Oak, it is operated by Transport UK London Bus.

== History ==
On 15 September 1954, route 63 was extended from Honor Oak to Crystal Palace as a replacement for the British Railways branch line to Crystal Palace (High Level), which was closed at the same time.

In 2003, route 63 was withdrawn between Honor Oak and Crystal Palace, replaced by route 363.

On 13 November 2021, route 63 passed to Abellio London using 29 new BYD Alexander Dennis Enviro400EVs. These buses were specified with high-specification interiors, including skylights and large rear windows, wood-effect flooring, larger wheelchair and buggy spaces, leather seating with phone chargers built into the headrests, and onboard route displays as a pilot of TfL's 'Future Bus' project.

== Current route ==
Route 63 operates via these primary locations:

- King's Cross station
- Mount Pleasant
- Clerkenwell Road
- Farringdon station
- City Thameslink station
- Ludgate Circus
- Blackfriars station
- Blackfriars Bridge
- Southwark station
- St George's Circus
- Elephant & Castle station
- New Kent Road
- Bricklayers Arms
- Peckham High Street
- Peckham Rye station
- Honor Oak Forest Hill Tavern
