= London Buses route 45 =

London bus route

45
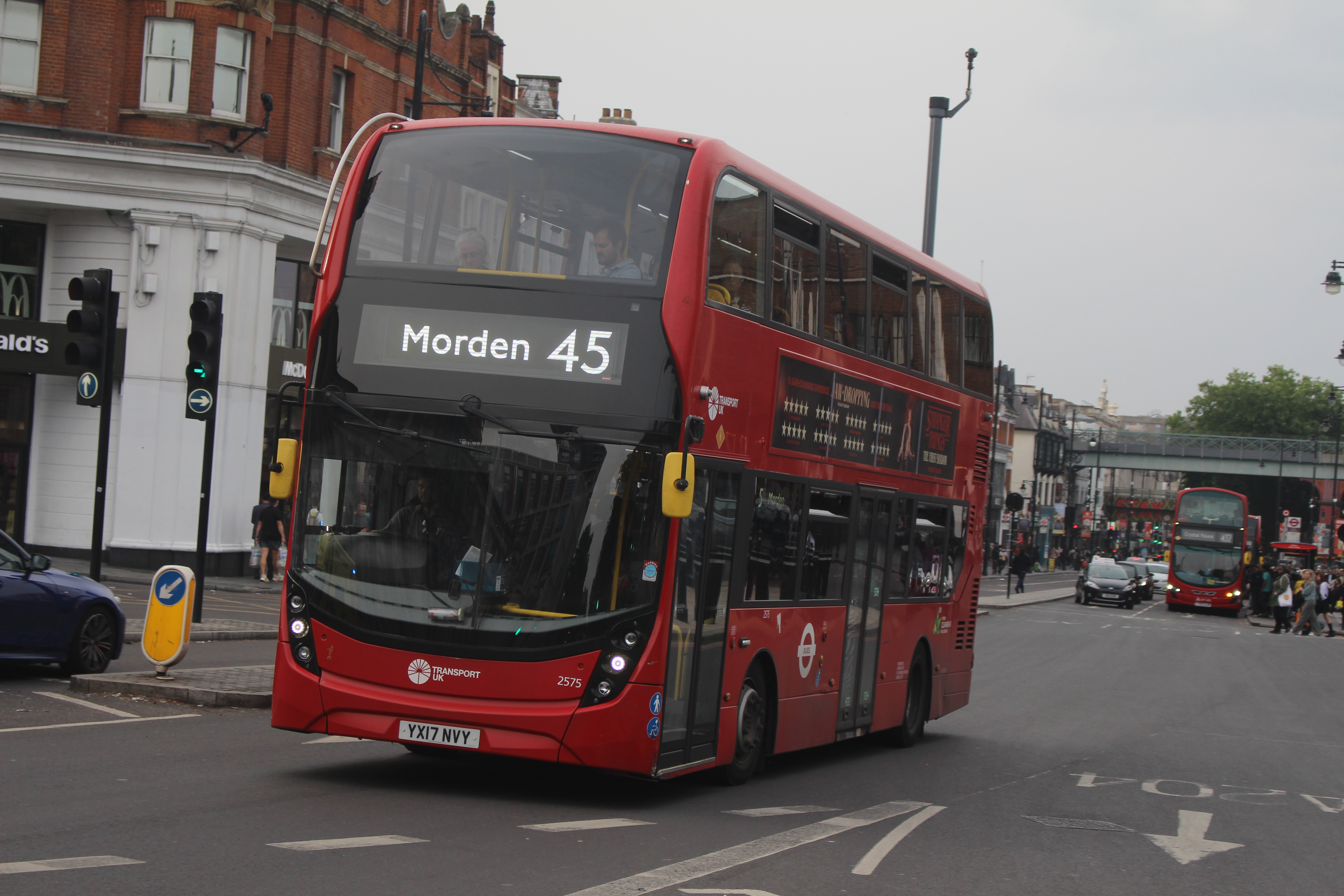
- Transport UK London Bus Alexander Dennis Enviro400H MMC in Brixton in June 2025

Overview
- Operator: Transport UK London Bus
- Garage: Walworth
- Vehicle: Alexander Dennis Enviro400H MMC
- Peak vehicle requirement: 17
- Began service: 1 October 1950
- Former operator: London Central
- Night-time: No night service

Route
- Start: Morden station
- Via: Mitcham; Streatham; Brixton
- End: Camberwell Green
- Length: 10 miles (16 km)

Service
- Level: Daily
- Journey time: 50-90 minutes
- Operates: 03:40 until 01:44

London Buses route 45 is a Transport for London contracted bus route in London, England. Running between Morden station and Camberwell Green, it is operated by Transport UK London Bus.

== History ==
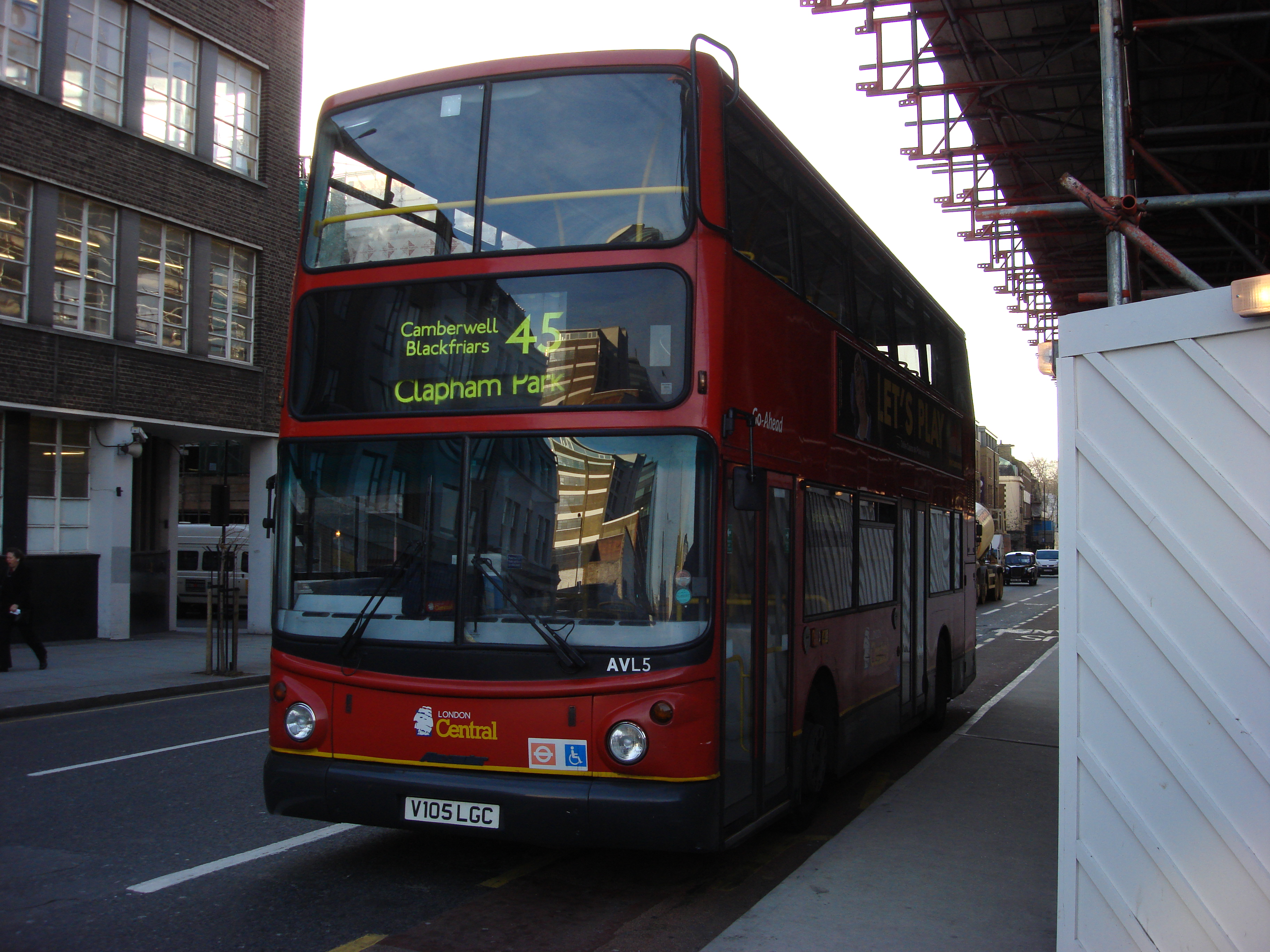
An Alexander ALX400 double-decker operated by London Central on route 45, December 2007

Route 45 was introduced on 1 October 1950 as a replacement for trolleybus route 34 between Battersea and Farringdon Street via Clapham Junction, Clapham Common, Stockwell, Brixton, Camberwell Green, Elephant & Castle and Blackfriars Bridge. It was operated by AEC Routemasters. On 17 January 1951 it was extended from Battersea to South Kensington station. On 1 February 1961, the route was extended from Farringdon Street to Hampstead Heath via Grays Inn Road and King's Cross replacing trolleybus route 513. On 8 January 1972, it was withdrawn between King's Cross and Hampstead and replaced by route 46. On 28 October 1978, the route was extended from King's Cross to Archway station.

On 3 August 1985, route 45 was converted to one man operation with the AEC Routemasters replaced by Leyland Titans.

Having been operated by London Central out of Camberwell garage since first tendered in 1987, on 11 November 2017 it was taken over by Abellio London's Walworth garage with Alexander Dennis Enviro400 MMCs introduced. On 15 June 2019, the route was withdrawn between King's Cross and Elephant & Castle.

In June 2022, Transport for London launched a consultation with a view to withdrawing route 45, with route 35 and a re-routed 59 continuing to serve its length. However, it decided not to go ahead with the proposals and so no changes to route 45 were made.

In September 2024, Transport for London launched a consultation proposing to restructure route 45 in order to replace route 118 which was proposed for withdrawal. In December 2024, it was confirmed that the changes would proceed with route 45 being restructured to operate between Morden station and Camberwell Green. This change was implemented on 1 February 2025.

== Current route ==
Route 45 operates via these primary locations:

- Morden station
- Mitcham tram stop
- Streatham Common station
- Streatham station
- Streatham Hill station
- Brixton station
- Loughborough Junction station
- Camberwell Green
