= Elephant & Castle railway station =

Railway station in London, England

Elephant & Castle
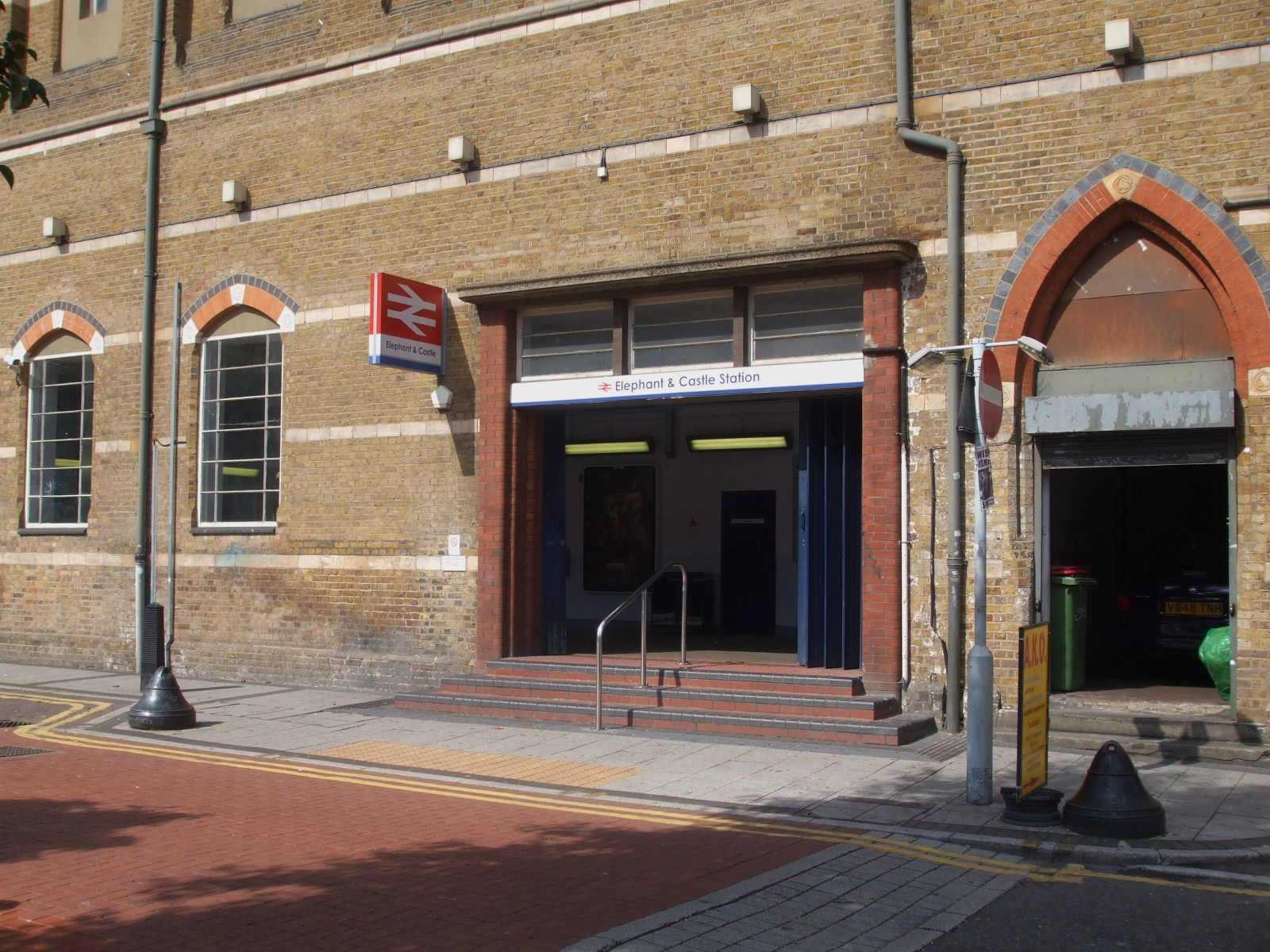
- Interactive map of Elephant & Castle

General information
- Location: Newington
- Local authority: London Borough of Southwark
- Managed by: Thameslink
- Owner: Network Rail
- Station code: EPH
- DfT category: E
- Number of platforms: 4
- Fare zone: 1 and 2
- OSI: Elephant & Castle

National Rail annual entry and exit
- 2020–21: ▼0.667 million
- Interchange: ▼49,497
- 2021–22: ▲1.316 million
- Interchange: ▲0.101 million
- 2022–23: ▲1.681 million
- Interchange: ▲0.439 million
- 2023–24: ▲1.880 million
- Interchange: ▼0.352 million
- 2024–25: ▲2.169 million
- Interchange: ▲0.442 million

Railway companies
- Original company: London, Chatham and Dover Railway

Key dates
- 6 October 1862: Temporary station opened
- February 1863: Replaced with permanent structure

Other information
- External links: Departures; Facilities
- Coordinates: 51.4944°N 0.0998°W

Elephant & Castle railway station is a National Rail station in Newington, south London. Along with the London Underground station of the same name, it is located in the London Borough of Southwark and is in both London fare zone 1 and 2. The station is managed by Thameslink, with services operated by both Thameslink and Southeastern. There is out-of-station interchange with the nearby Elephant & Castle tube station.

== History ==
The London, Chatham and Dover Railway built the Metropolitan Extension north from Herne Hill and reached a temporary terminus at Elephant and Castle on 6 October 1862. The next station to the south was Camberwell that opened on the same day. The line was extended north to Blackfriars Bridge station on 1 June 1864.

=== 2021 fire ===
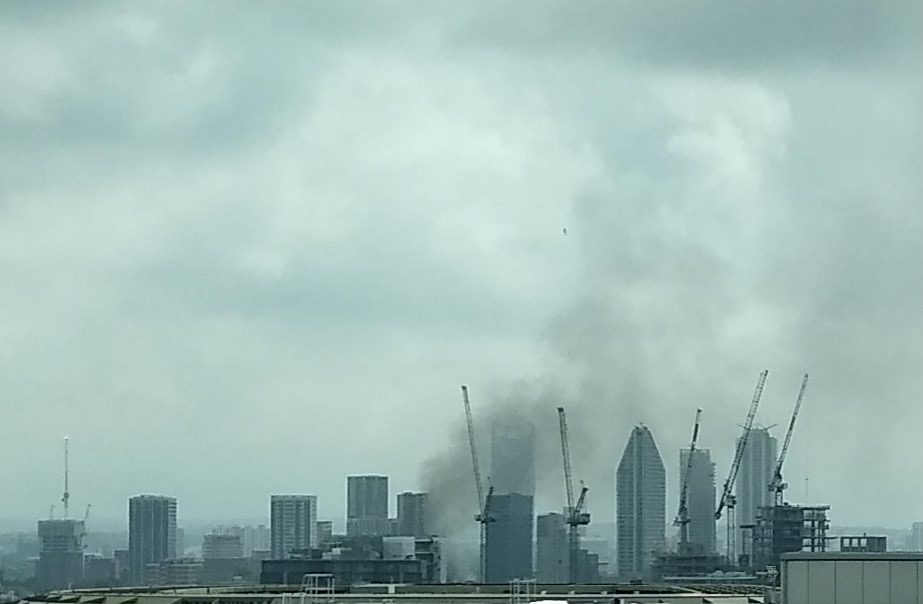
Smoke from the 2021 fire

On 28 June 2021, a fire broke out under the station. The London Fire Brigade dispatched 15 fire engines. The fire is thought to be accidental and believed to have been caused by an electrical fault within a car in a spray booth at T.R. Autos, a garage in the arches of the railway viaduct, then spread to the surrounding commercial units, six cars and a telephone box. Six people were treated for minor injuries at the scene and one person was taken to hospital.

The surface station was undamaged, but became engulfed in smoke. The station and railway line were closed, leading to the cancellation of several services. Some nearby residents were evacuated from their homes. Access to the underground tube station was restricted, with one entrance being briefly closed as a precaution. Many roads in the area were closed.

== Design ==
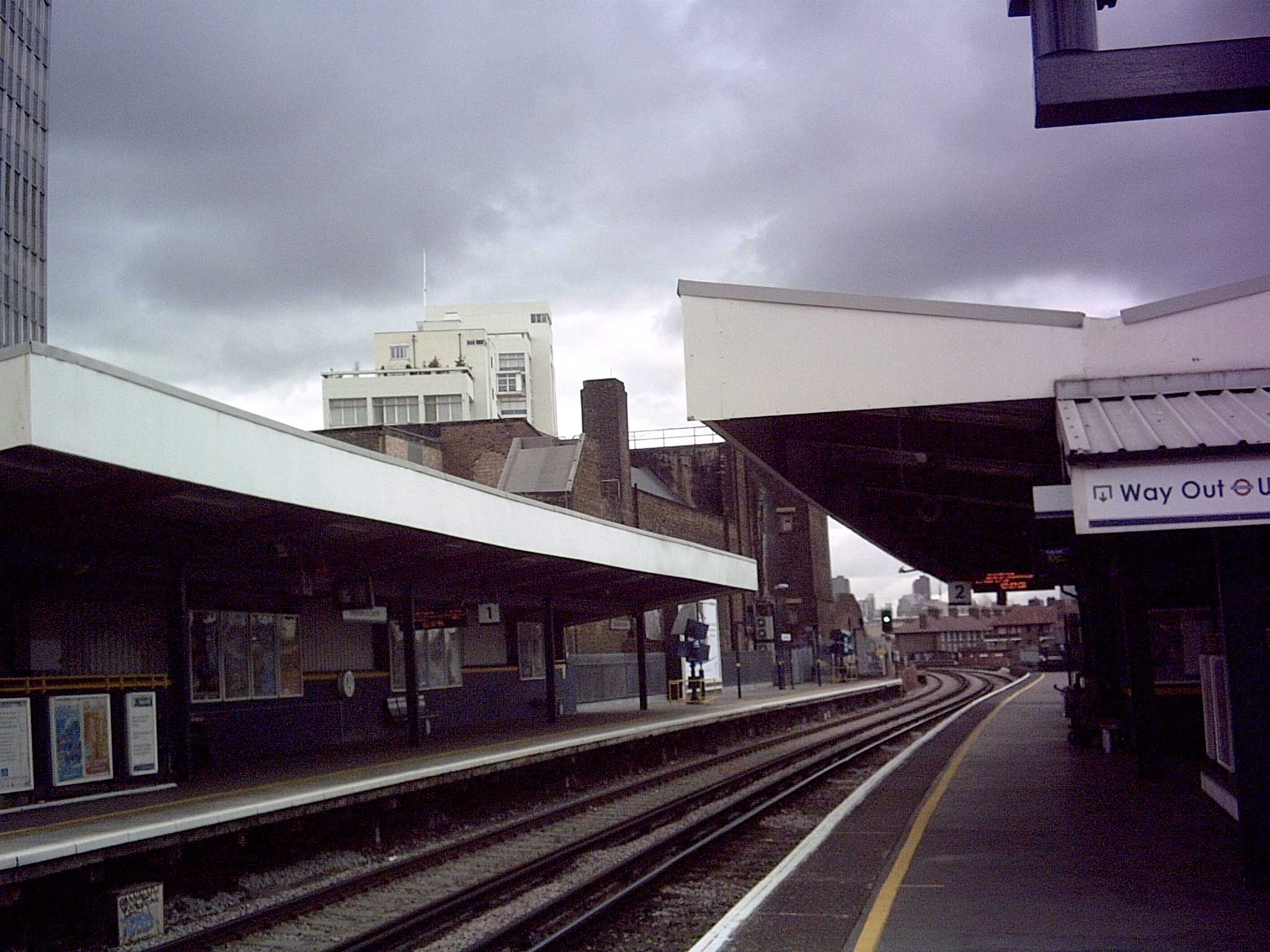
Platforms 1 and 2

The station is located on a brick viaduct. It currently has one entrance on Elephant Road. There are four platforms, two being on the island between the lines. Three staircases provide the only access to the platforms, as there are no lifts or escalators.

=== Elephant and Castle redevelopment ===
An entrance directly connected to the upper level of the Elephant and Castle Shopping Centre closed in September 2020, as part of the redevelopment of the area. A new entrance to the railway station will be built, connecting to the new town centre. Existing railway arches will be opened up, providing access for pedestrians to Elephant Park. Interchange with the Underground will also improve, with a direct route through the new town centre to a new Underground ticket hall. However, local press have criticised the omission of step-free access to the National Rail platforms.

== Location ==
The station is not directly connected to the London Underground station, both entrances of which are some distance away. There is an out-of-station interchange facility with Elephant & Castle London Underground station.

Local bus connections are provided by bus stops at New Kent Road and Walworth Road. London Buses routes 1, 53, 63, 68, 168, 172, 188, 363, 415, 453, N1 and N63 stop near the station at New Kent Road. Routes 12, 35, 40, 68, 136, 148, 171, 176, 343, 468, P5 and night routes N68, N89, N171 and N343 stop near the station at Walworth Road.

There is also a coach stop at New Kent Road; National Express coaches towards Kent stop near the station.

== Services ==
Off-peak, all services at Elephant & Castle are operated by Thameslink using Class 700 EMUs.

The typical off-peak service in trains per hour is:

- 2 tph to London Blackfriars
- 4 tph to St Albans City
- 4 tph to Sutton (2 of these run via Mitcham Junction and 2 run via Wimbledon)
- 2 tph to Sevenoaks via Catford

During the peak hours, additional services between Orpington, Kentish Town and Luton call at the station. In addition, the service to London Blackfriars is extended to and from Welwyn Garden City via Finsbury Park.

In addition, a small number of Southeastern services call at the station during the peak hours. The station is served by a number of services between London Blackfriars and Beckenham Junction, as well as a morning service to London Blackfriars from Crayford.

A small number of late evening Thameslink services are extended beyond St Albans City to Bedford. On Sundays, there are also direct services beyond St Albans City to Luton.

Preceding station	National Rail	Following station
London Blackfriars	Thameslink Thameslink	Loughborough Junction
London Blackfriars	Thameslink Thameslink	Denmark Hill
