= London Buses route 68 =

London bus route

68
- Transport UK London Bus BYD Alexander Dennis Enviro400EV at Waterloo station in September 2025

Overview
- Operator: Transport UK London Bus
- Garage: Walworth
- Vehicle: New Routemaster
- Peak vehicle requirement: 23
- Former operators: London Central; Arriva London; London Regional Transport
- Night-time: N68

Route
- Start: Euston bus station
- Via: Russell Square; Aldwych; Waterloo; Elephant and Castle; Camberwell; Herne Hill
- End: West Norwood

Service
- Level: Daily

London Buses route 68 is a Transport for London contracted bus route in London, England. Running between Euston bus station and West Norwood, it is operated by Transport UK London Bus.

== History ==
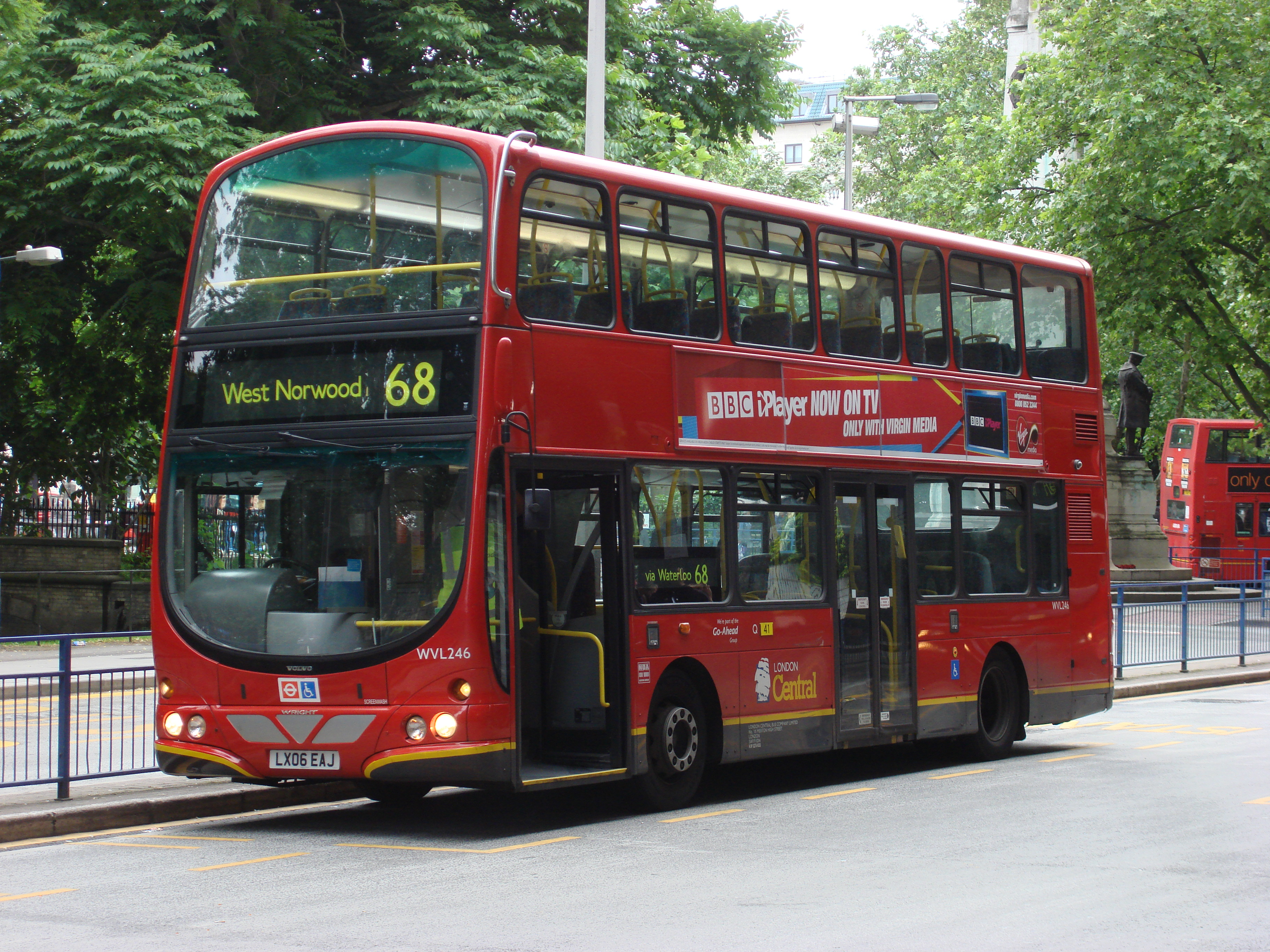
London Central Wright Eclipse Gemini bodied Volvo B7TL in June 2008

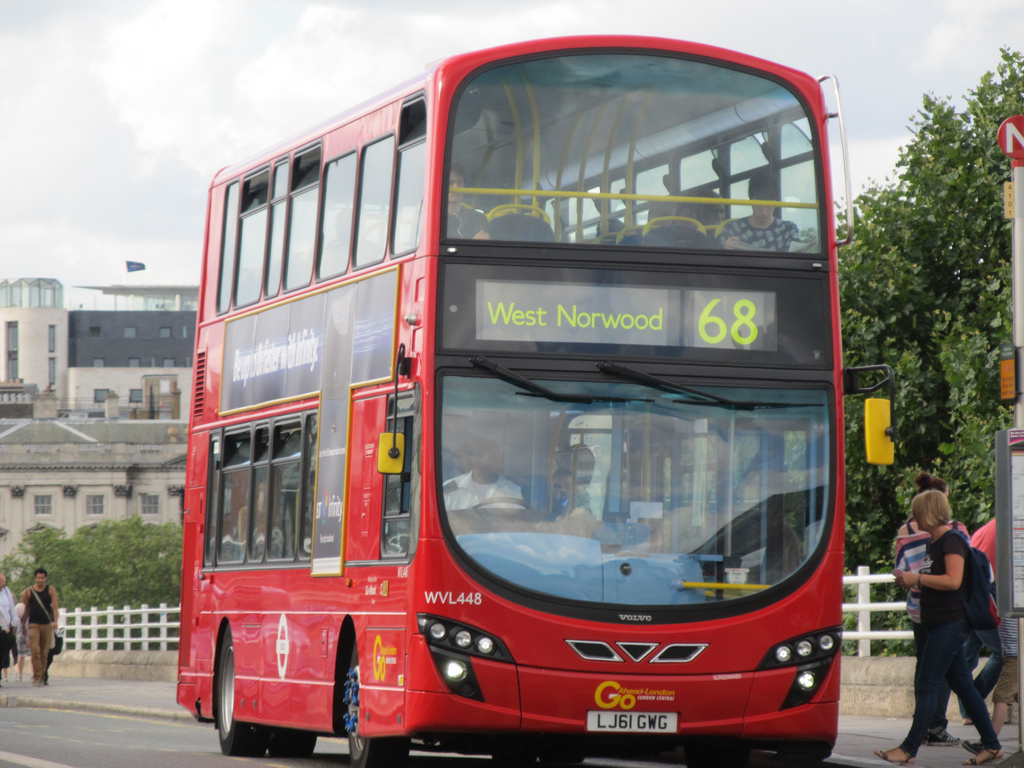
London Central Wright Eclipse Gemini 2 bodied Volvo B9TL on Waterloo Bridge in April 2014

In the early period of motor omnibus travel, before World War I, number 68 was not in use as a route for the London General Omnibus Company, even though higher numbers up to 93 were active in 1912, for example.

The route was active at the start of World War II, its usual peacetime lighting of a pale blue colour was removed because of the risk of aerial bombing, and the buses were blacked-out.

By 1952, after the last trams stopped running, the route ran from the Earl of Eldon public house in South Croydon to Chalk Farm tube station in what is now Camden. This was a long 15 mile journey via places such as Thornton Heath, Norwood, Herne Hill, Camberwell, Elephant & Castle, Waterloo and Euston station, which nowadays would require two changes of bus. The route started operating AEC Routemaster buses on Sundays in 1963 and switched to full Routemaster operation in 1970. The buses at this time were based in garages in Chalk Farm, Norwood and Croydon.

On 25 October 1986, the route was split in two with route 168 introduced between Hampstead Heath and Waterloo. Route 68 now operated from West Norwood to Euston being converted to one man operation on the same day with Leyland Olympians.

On 27 October 1986, a parallel peak-hour express service numbered route X68 from West Croydon bus station to Russell Square was introduced, running express from Waterloo to West Norwood. It was renumbered SL6 on 31 July 2023.

As part of the privatisation of London bus services, in January 1995 route 68 was taken over by Arriva London. Upon being re-tendered, on 1 April 2006 routes 68 passed from Arriva London to London Central with the southern terminus amended from Norwood bus garage to West Norwood station. London Central operated it out of Camberwell bus garage. London Central successfully tendered to retain the route, with a further contract commencing in 2011.

On 5 February 2016, New Routemasters were introduced on the route. When next tendered, it was awarded to Abellio London who commenced operating it out of Walworth bus garage on 31 March 2018.

The journalist Peter Watts reviewed his experiences of the current service for Time Out. He traveled regularly from Herne Hill to Great Russell Street, near the Time Out offices in Tottenham Court Road. The journey takes between 40 and 90 minutes depending upon the congestion in traffic bottlenecks like Camberwell Green. Often, when the service is running poorly, it will terminate short of the final destination, unloading at a stop like Aldwych, or it will pass by Herne Hill without stopping, forcing passengers to take the shorter route 468 instead. Such incidents commonly occur three times a week and so cause him much frustration.

Author and journalist Simon Jenkins on the other hand described the 68 bus as the "Queen of buses" for its stately progress through the bustling shopping streets of South London.

Travelling on this bus route has been suggested as a cure for agoraphobia. Travelling for 2-5 stops during the day was considered a medium level exercise, while travelling from Camberwell Green to the Elephant & Castle alone during the rush hour, was considered the most challenging exercise - more terrifying than walking down the high street or shopping in a supermarket.

In October 2021, the frequency of the service was reduced from seven or eight buses per hour to six.

== Notable passengers ==
- The spies Harry Houghton and Ethel Gee were trailed by a Special Branch agent when they travelled on the 68 between Waterloo Road and Walworth Road.
- Simon Jenkins - journalist and author.

== Current route ==
Route 68 operates via these primary locations:

- Euston bus station for Euston station
- Russell Square station
- Holborn station
- Aldwych
- Waterloo station
- Elephant & Castle station
- Walworth
- Camberwell Green
- King's College Hospital
- Denmark Hill station
- Herne Hill station
- Tulse Hill station
- West Norwood
