= London Buses route 176 =

London bus route

176
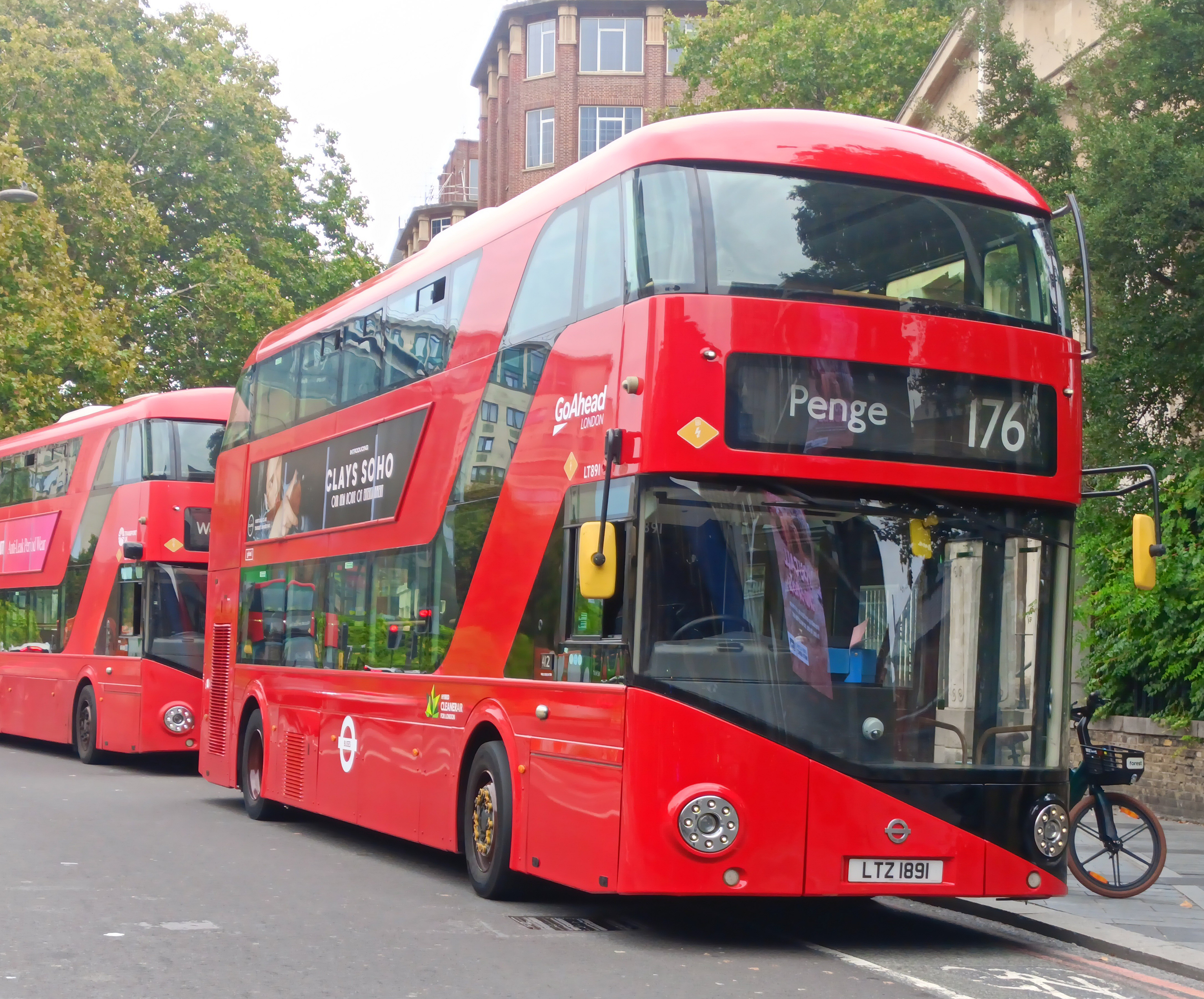
- London Central New Routemaster at Waterloo station in September 2025

Overview
- Operator: London Central (Go-Ahead London)
- Garage: Camberwell

Route
- Start: Penge
- Via: Forest Hill; East Dulwich; Denmark Hill; Camberwell; Elephant and Castle; Waterloo
- End: Tottenham Court Road station

London Buses route 176 is a Transport for London contracted bus route in London, England. Running between Penge and Tottenham Court Road station, it is operated by Go-Ahead London subsidiary London Central.

== History ==
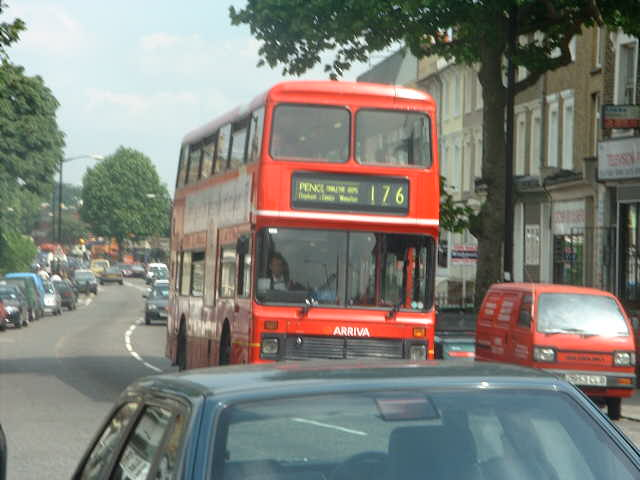
A Leyland Olympian double-decker operated by Arriva London on route 176 in Dulwich, July 2000

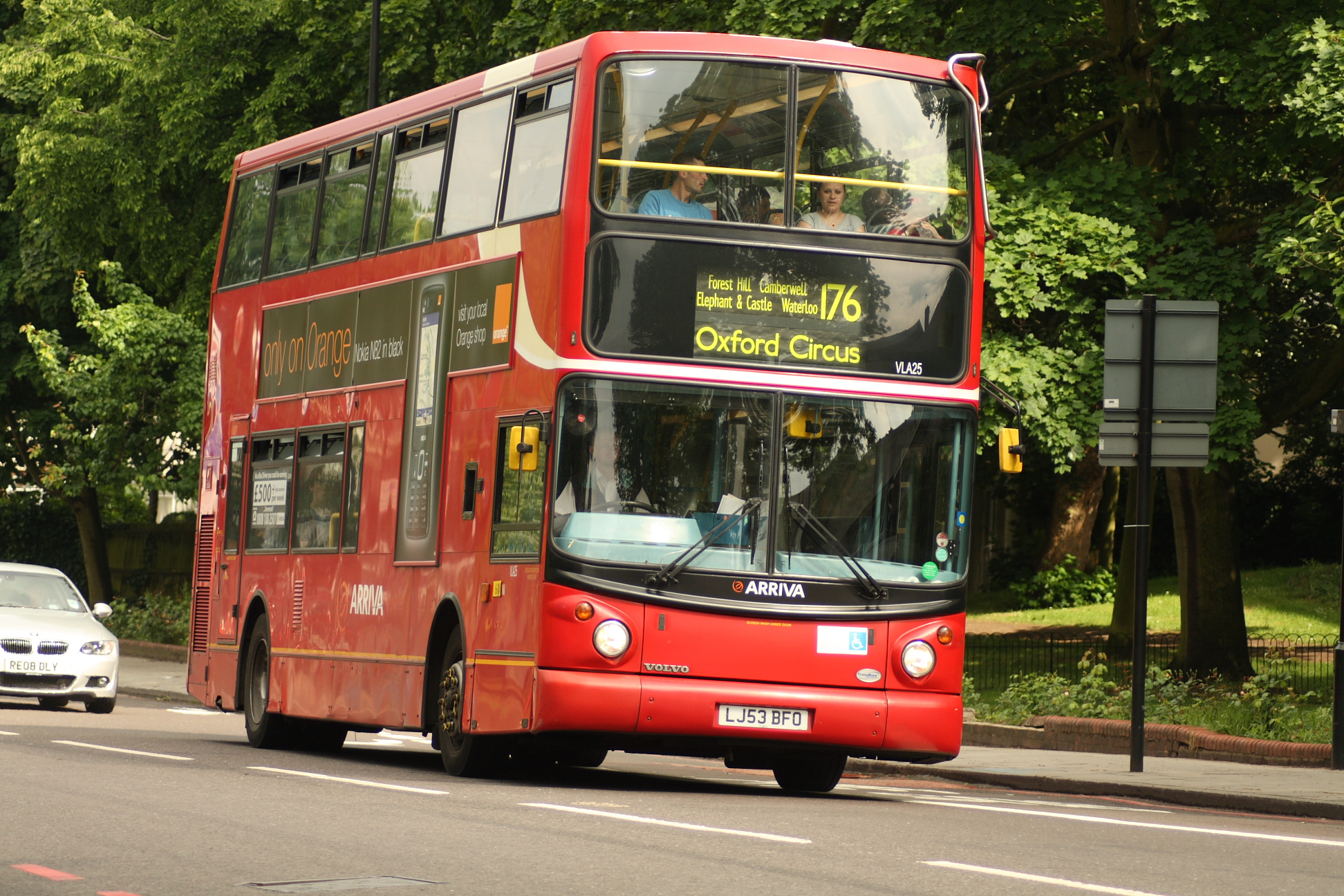
A Volvo B7TL double-decker operated by Arriva London on route 176 in Forest Hill, May 2008

Upon being re-tendered, the route was retained by Arriva London with a new contract commencing on 14 November 2003.

On 3 January 2009 the route was withdrawn between Tottenham Court Road and Oxford Circus to allow Andrew Borde Street to be closed and used as a work site for the upgrade of Tottenham Court Road station and the construction of the Crossrail station. In January 2010, Transport for London claimed this shortening of route 176 as part of its implementation of the Mayor's request to reduce the bus flow in Oxford Street by 10% in each of 2009 and 2010.

== Current route ==
Route 176 operates via these primary locations:

- Penge High Street
- Penge West station
- Sydenham station
- Forest Hill station
- Dulwich Library
- East Dulwich station
- Denmark Hill station
- King's College Hospital
- Camberwell Green
- Walworth
- Elephant & Castle station
- Waterloo station
- Aldwych
- Charing Cross station
- Trafalgar Square
- Leicester Square station
- Tottenham Court Road station
