= Camberwell Green =

Green space in Camberwell, London, England

Coordinates: 51.475°N 0.093°W

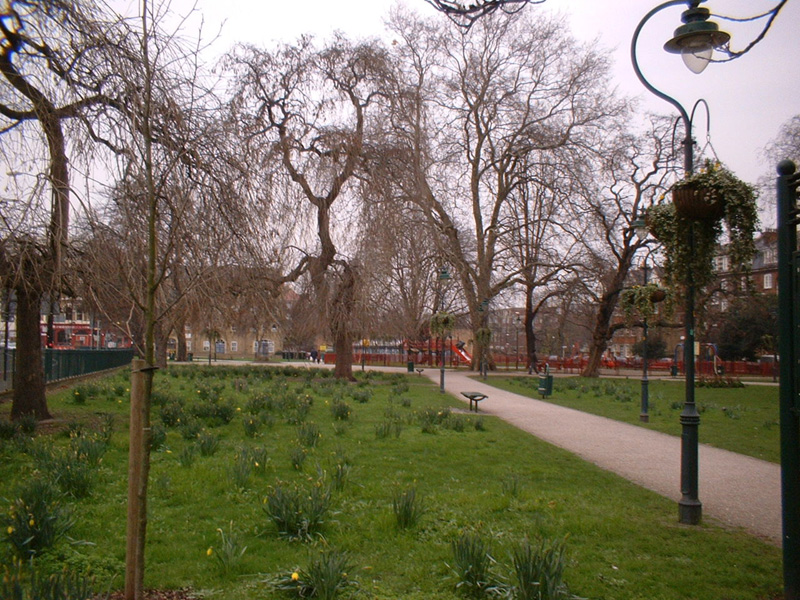
Camberwell Green in February 2004

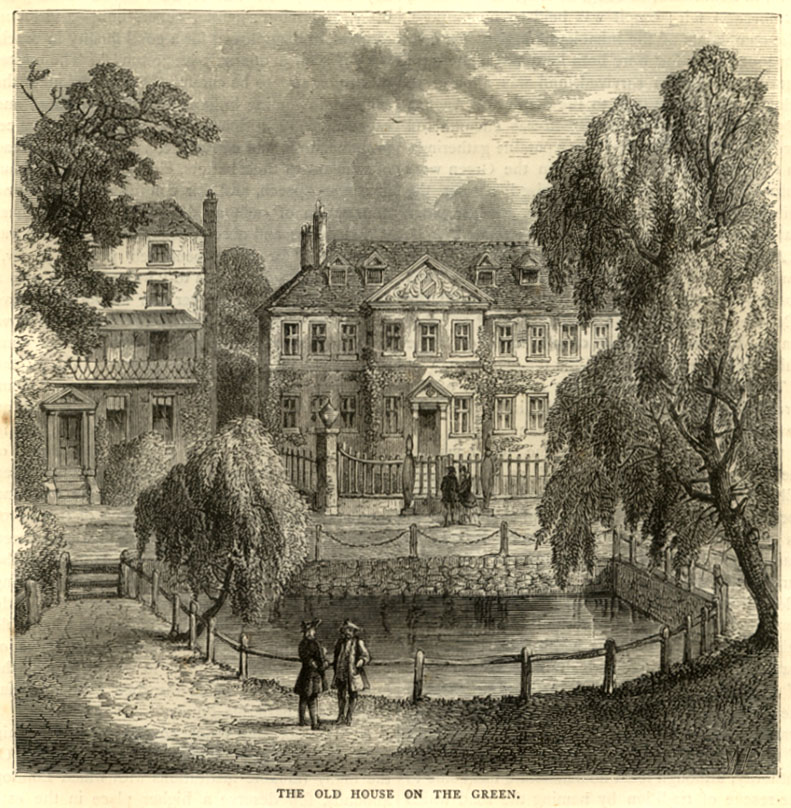
Houses on the edge of the Green, 1880s

Camberwell Green is a hectare (2.5 acres) of common land in Camberwell, south London laid out as a formal park. Its south-west corner is the junction of Camberwell Road/Denmark Hill and Camberwell New Road/Camberwell Church Street. Its other edges share one point of motor vehicle access. Behind a library at the north-east of the Green is the former Camberwell Magistrate's Court, and at the north-west is a home for the elderly. To the south-west, and overlooking the Green, is a parade of shops including banks and restaurants. The Green is recorded in surveys and accounts of the manor of Camberwell and vestry of Southwark as common land, meaning owned by the lord of the manor but subject to grazing and other rights of local residents. It was taken over by Camberwell Parish Vestry in the 19th century to protect it from development. Camberwell Green is also the name of the London Borough of Southwark electoral ward around the Green.

Measured from building to building, the open space including roads and pavements, and private frontages (size of the square) is 1.8 hectares (4.4 acres), and due to curves its parameters are not fixed; these average about 190 metres (620 ft) by 90 metres (300 ft).

== See also ==
- Camberwell
- "Camberwell Green" or No. 6 Allegretto grazioso in A major by Felix Mendelssohn
