= Routemaster =

Routemaster may refer to:

- AEC Routemaster, a front-engined double-decker bus built 1954–1968 in London
- New Routemaster, a hybrid diesel-electric double-decker bus operated in London from 2012
