= Barking bus garage =

Barking bus garage may refer to these bus garages in London:

- Barking bus garage (Arriva), operated by Arriva London with code DX
- Barking bus garage (Stagecoach), operated by East London with code BK
- River Road bus garage, in River Road, Barking, with code RR
