= Vehicle registration plates of Northern Ireland =

Northern Ireland
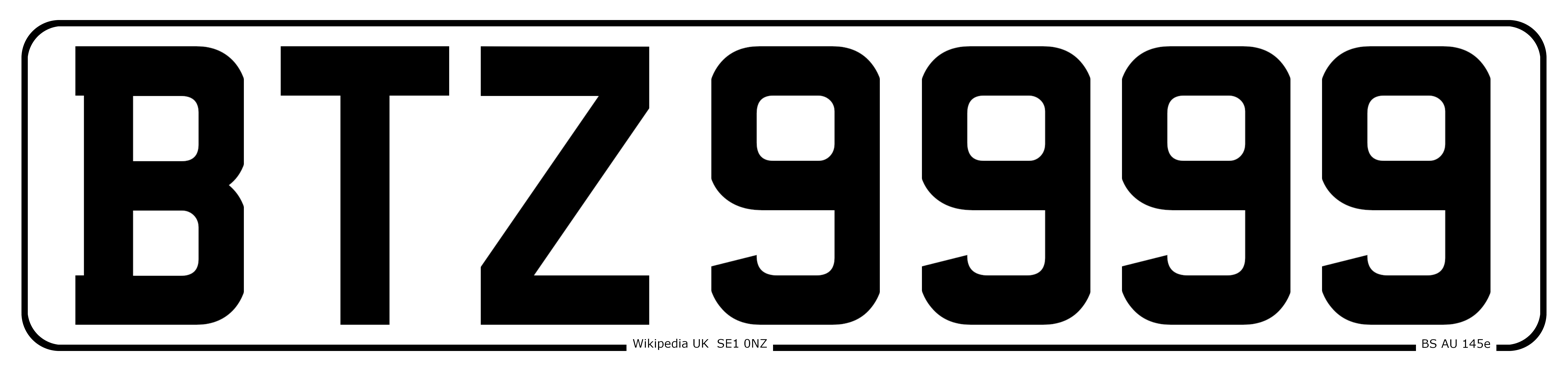

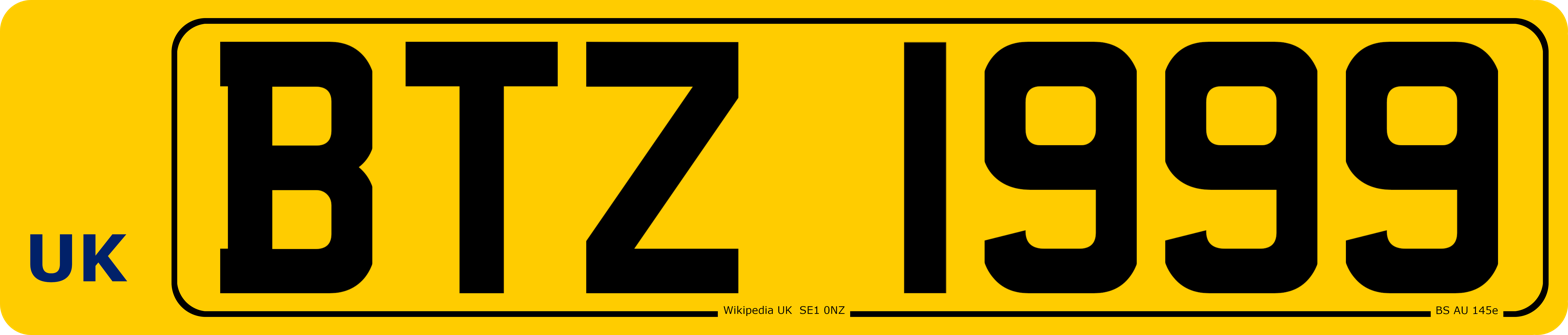
- NI regular front (top) and rear (bottom) number plates. The national identifier is optional, and the distinguishing code for the United Kingdom, including Northern Ireland is "UK". Number plates including the code are valid in countries party to the Vienna Convention on Road Traffic if displayed on its own or together with the Union Jack. The "UK" code replaced the previous "GB" code from 28 September 2021.
- Country: United Kingdom (Northern Ireland)
- Country code: UK

Current series
- Size: 520 mm × 111 mm 20.5 in × 4.4 in
- Serial format: AAA 1234
- Introduced: January 1966

Availability
- Issued by: DVA (until 2014); DVLA (2014 - present)

History
- First issued: 1 January 1904

Vehicle registration plates in Northern Ireland use a modified version of the British national registration plate system that was initiated for the whole of the United Kingdom of Great Britain and Ireland in 1903. Originally, all counties in the UK were allocated two identification letters. At that time, the whole of the island of Ireland was in the UK, and the letters I and Z were reserved for the Irish counties. The 'I' series was used first, but by the time it came to using the 'Z' series in 1926, the Irish Free State had already come into existence, and so it was agreed that the Northern Ireland would use the AZ – YZ series, while the Free State would use the ZA – ZZ series. In 1987, the Republic of Ireland broke away from the system altogether. As of 2002 there were reportedly 794,477 recorded registration plates in Northern Ireland, compared to only 50 for the island as a whole when the format was first introduced in 1903.

The full list of codes used in Northern Ireland appears below.

== Format ==
There are two number plate systems within the UK: one for Northern Ireland and another for Great Britain

Diagram of Northern Ireland number plate, descriptions below

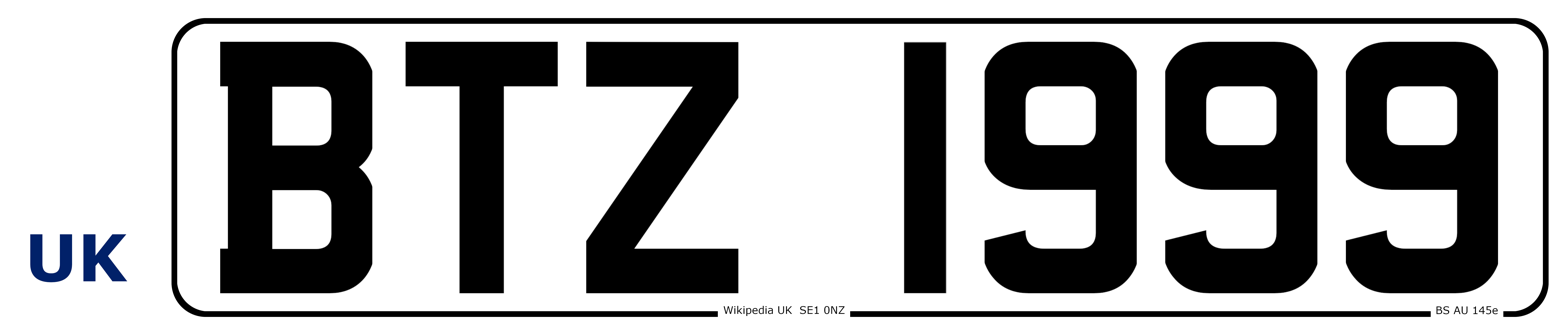

As in Great Britain, each code originally ran from 1 to 9999, and when one was completed, another was allocated. All possible codes had been allocated by 1957, following which reversed sequences were introduced, the first county to do so being Antrim in January 1958 with 1 IA. These reversed sequences were completed quickly, leading to the introduction of the current "AXX 1234" format in January 1966, where "XX" is the county code and "A" is a serial letter. This format allowed capacity to be increased. Each county adopted it once they had completed their reversed sequences, the last one to do so being County Londonderry in October 1973 with AIW 1. From November 1985, the first 100 numbers of each series were withheld for use as cherished registrations. From April 1989, the numbers 101-999 were also withheld in this way. Even multiples of 1000 and 1111 ("four-of-a-kind") are deemed cherished by the DVLA and thus withheld. Each series ends at 9998 and follows on to the next letter/number combination in the series.

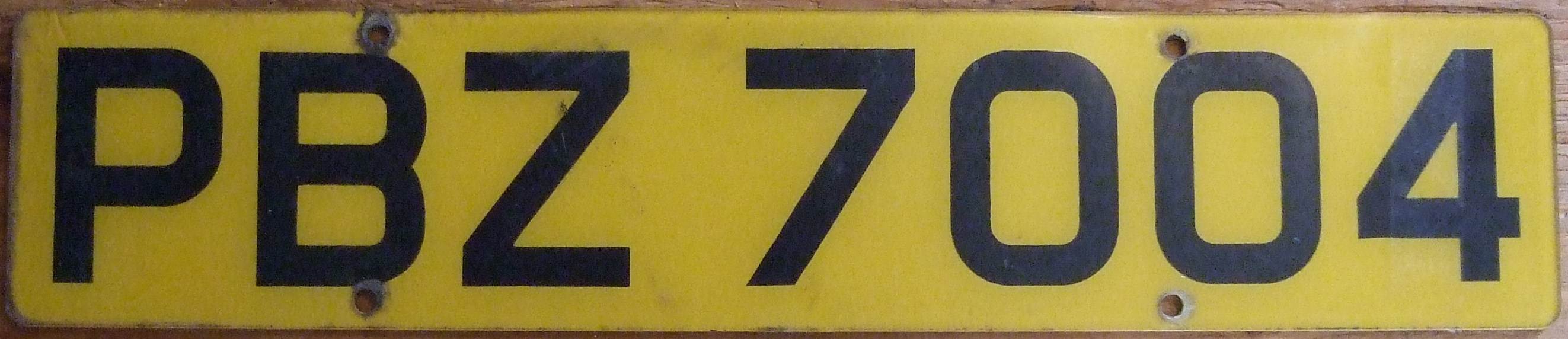
Northern Ireland plate. This particular County Down plate, which dates from the last century, uses an old-style font.

=== International vehicle registration code on the number plates ===
The distinguishing code for the United Kingdom, including Northern Ireland is "UK". Prior to 28 September 2021, "GB" was used. Number plates featuring other codes, such as "NI" or "IRL" (the distinguishing code for Ireland) are unofficial. From October 2021 if an owner of a vehicle wishes to avoid attaching a separate black on white “UK” sticker, it is necessary for the number plates to display “UK” on the left side. If the vehicle is driven in a country not a party to the Vienna Convention, a separate sign (black on white “UK” sticker) also has to be displayed at the rear of the vehicle. Of the EU countries, a separate identifier is only needed when travelling in Cyprus, Malta, and Spain, as they are not party to the convention. (Note: "Ireland is not a party of the Vienna Convention but no separate 'GB' sticker is required." Accessed in June 2021)

While motorists with vehicles registered in Great Britain are permitted by the DVLA to use number plates carrying Euro-style bands with UK national flags and country codes (such as ENG, England or SCO), this is not possible in Northern Ireland. The Road Vehicles (Display of Registration Marks) (Amendment) Regulations 2009 state that "Paragraph (4) does not apply—(...) (b)if the relevant vehicle is recorded in the part of the register relating to Northern Ireland." Paragraph four reads "Subject to paragraphs (5) to (8), there may be displayed on a plate or other device an arrangement of letters corresponding with one of the sub-paragraphs of paragraph (9) and an emblem corresponding with one of the sub-paragraphs of paragraph (10)".

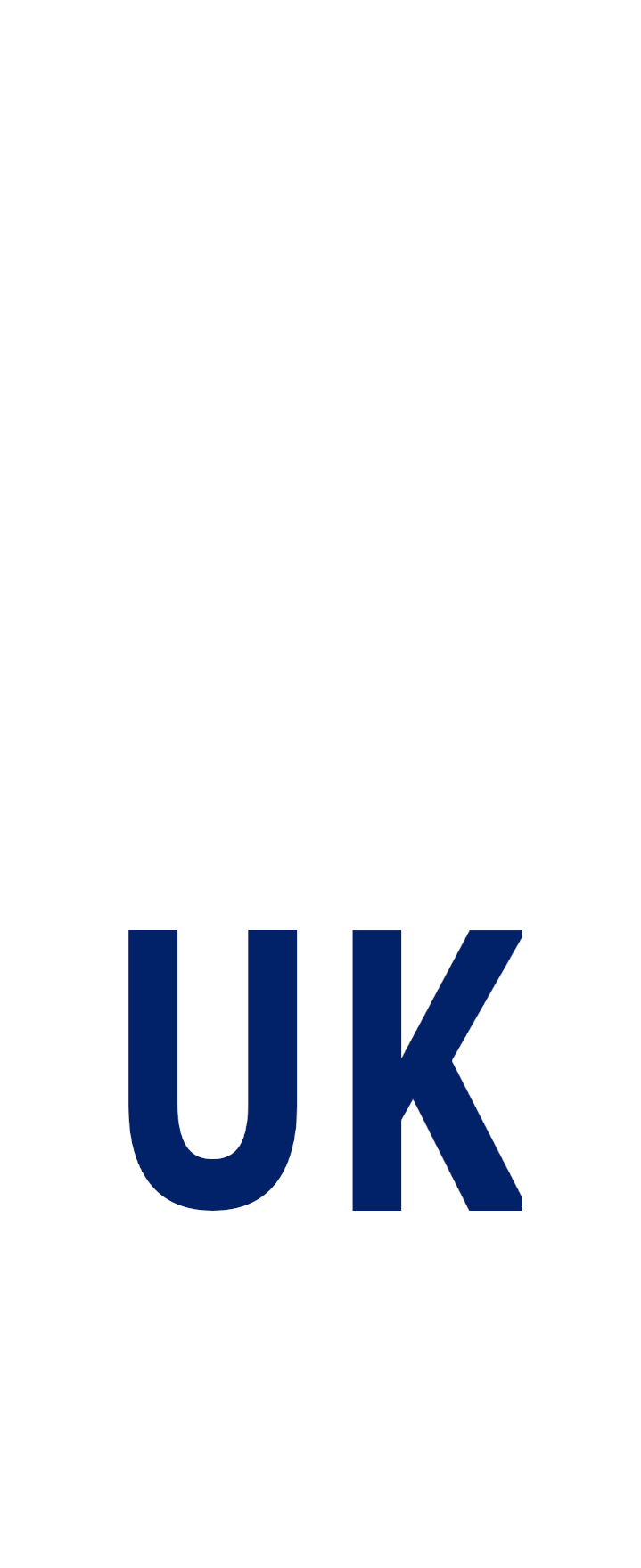
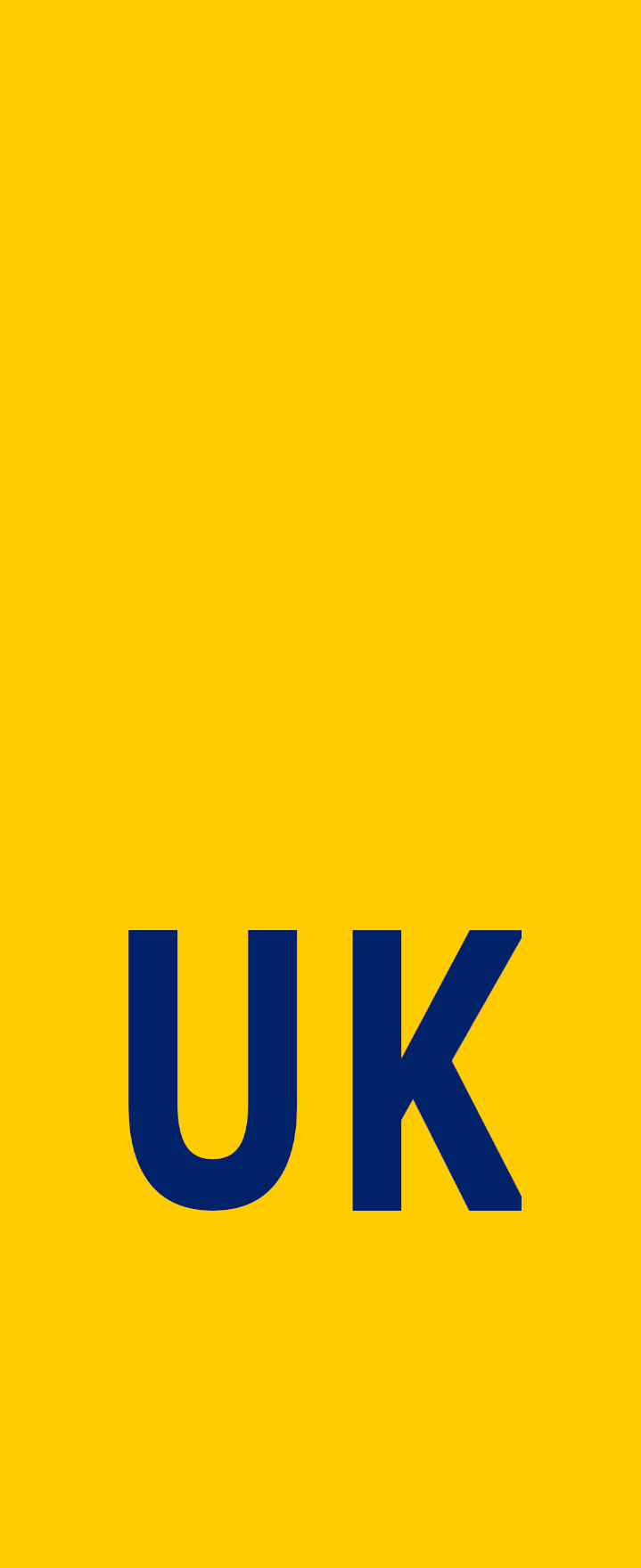
The current "UK" band front (left) and rear (right)

==== European Union symbol ====
When the UK was a member state of the European Union, it was possible to choose to display number plates conforming to the common EU format introduced by Council Regulation (EC) No 2411/98, with a blue strip on the left side of the plate with the European Union symbol (circle of stars) above the international vehicle registration code of the member state (GB). This format can not be issued after the transition period ended. With Northern Ireland no longer being a part of the EU, the plates with the EU symbol are now no longer issued.

EU member states that require foreign vehicles to display a distinguishing sign of the country of origin are obliged by Article 3 of EU Regulation No. 2411/98 to accept this standard design as a distinguishing sign when displayed on a vehicle registered in another member state, making a separate sign unnecessary for vehicles registered in the EU.

After Brexit, other EU countries are no longer required to accept UK "Europlates", as the regulation only requires member states to accept the standard design as a distinguishing sign when displayed on a vehicle registered in another member state. After this, Euro-plates must be replaced by a number plate that features the UK code (GB before 28 September 2021) in order to be valid as a national identifier.

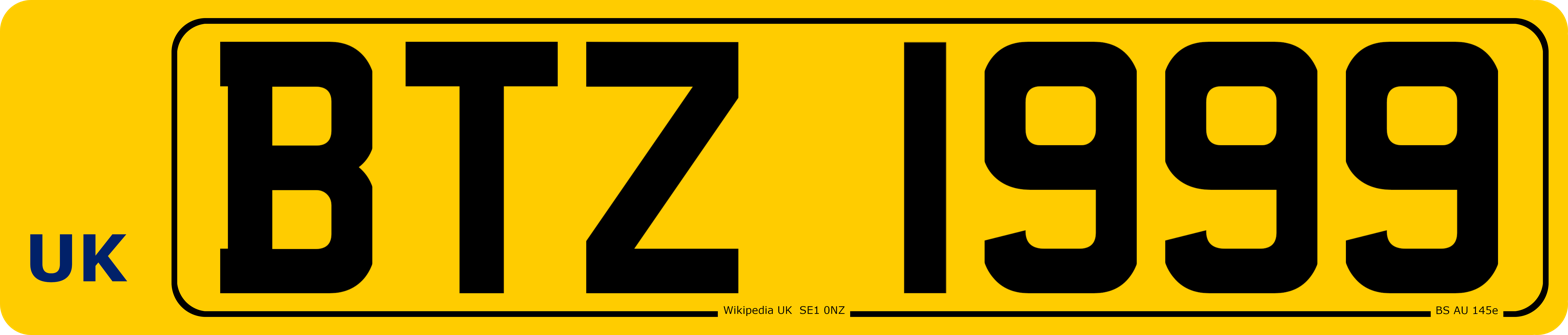
A Belfast plate displaying the optional EU format "UK" country code. Any other format displaying a side badge, including those bearing the codes "NI" or "IRL", are unofficial.

== Administration ==
The administrative counties of Northern Ireland were abolished by the Local Government Act (Northern Ireland) 1972, and their responsibility for issuing registrations was transferred to the NI Ministry of Home Affairs, and later the Department of the Environment NI. The former vehicle section in the county town of each local authority became a "local office" of the relevant departmental agency, formerly Driver and Vehicle Licensing Northern Ireland and latterly the Driver and Vehicle Agency (DVA) in Coleraine.

From 21 July 2014, vehicle registration in Northern Ireland became the responsibility of the Driver and Vehicle Licensing Agency DVLA in Swansea, which also administers the system used in Great Britain. The pre-1972 format of Northern Ireland registration plates continues unchanged in Northern Ireland.

== County codes in alphabetical order ==
All the codes from IA to IZ, and from AI to WI (except for those containing G, Q, S and V, plus II), were allocated throughout the island of Ireland in 1903, in alphabetical order of counties and then of county boroughs. Hence, Antrim was allocated IA and Armagh IB, while County Dublin, now in the Republic of Ireland, was allocated IK, in between IJ for Down and IL for Fermanagh. Shortly before the partition of Ireland in 1922, Belfast completed OI and was thus allocated the next available code, XI, while YI and then ZI were allocated to Dublin City. After the partition, all codes with Z as the first letter (ZA, ZB etc.) were allocated in the Republic of Ireland, while all codes with Z as the second letter (AZ, BZ etc.) were allocated in Northern Ireland with the exception of County Mayo which had originally been allocated IZ. IG was allocated to Fermanagh in 2004. VI was allocated to City of Derry/Londonderry in 2023.

Code	County or City	Code	County or City	Code	County or City
AZ	Belfast	IL	Fermanagh	SZ	Down
BZ	Down	IW	County Londonderry	TZ	Downpatrick (from 2025 reassigned from Belfast)
CZ	Belfast	JI	Tyrone	UI	City of Derry
DZ	Antrim	JZ	Down	UZ	Ballymena (from 2025 reassigned from Belfast )
EZ	Belfast	KZ	Antrim	VI	City of Derry
FZ	Belfast	LZ	Armagh	VZ	Tyrone
GZ	Belfast	MZ	Belfast	WZ	Armagh (from 2025 Reassigned from Belfast)
HZ	Tyrone	NZ	County Londonderry	XI	Belfast
IA	Antrim	OI	Belfast	XZ	Armagh
IB	Armagh	OZ	Belfast	YZ	County Londonderry
IG	Fermanagh	PZ	Belfast	QNI	Cars with indeterminate age, kit cars.
IJ	Down	RZ	Antrim	LTZ	Buses built in Northern Ireland for Transport for London

=== Series per administrative county / DVA licensing local office ===
For each DVA licensing local office (administrative county before 1974) the two-letter sequences are shown first, followed by the reversed two-letter sequences, then the three-letter sequences.

CC code	CC number range		number CC range		ACC–YCC number range		number range ACC–YCC	
County Antrim / Ballymena
IA	1 to 9999	Dec 1903 – Mar 1932	1 to 9999	Jan 1958 – Jun 1960	1 to 9998 (Note: Authority transferred from Antrim County Council to Ballymena LVLO/VRO from 1 January 1974; the first registration following the transfer was GIA 8977.)	Jan 1966 – Jul 1985	1001 to 9998	Likely next
DZ	1 to 9999	Mar 1932 – Jan 1947	301 to 9999	Jun 1960 – Sep 1962	101 to 9998 (Note: BDZ ended at 7458 due to computerisation in October 1986, followed by CDZ 101.)	Jul 1985 – May 1998		
KZ	1 to 9999	Jan 1947 – Feb 1954	1 to 9999	Sep 1962 – Jun 1964	1001 to 9998	May 1998 – May 2010		
RZ	1 to 9999	Feb 1954 – Jan 1958	501 to 9999	Jun 1964 – Jan 1966	1001 to 9998	May 2010 – current		
County Armagh / Armagh
IB	1 to 9999	Dec 1903 – Aug 1947 (Note: Although LZ commenced in January 1947, IB was not completed until August 1947.)	301 to 9999	Apr 1962 – Nov 1965	1 to 9998	Mar 1972 – Nov 1996 (Note: Authority transferred from Armagh County Council to Armagh LVLO/VRO from 1 January 1974; the first registration following the transfer was AIB 7786.) (Note: JIB ended at 4400 due to computerisation in 1986, followed by KIB 101.)	1001 to 9998	Likely next
LZ	1 to 9999	Jan 1947 – Nov 1957	1 to 9999	Nov 1965 – Mar 1969	1001 to 9998	Nov 1996 – May 2010		
XZ	1 to 9999	Nov 1957 – Apr 1962	1 to 9999	Mar 1969 – Mar 1972	1001 to 9998	May 2010 – current		
Belfast County Borough / Belfast City
OI	1 to 9999	Jan 1904 – Jan 1921	1000 to 9999	Jun 1958 – Jun 1959	1 to 9999 (Note: Authority transferred from Belfast City Council to Belfast LVLO/VRO from 1 January 1974; the first registration following the transfer was GOI 8301.)	Apr 1969 – Apr 1982		
XI	1 to 9999	Jan 1921 – Feb 1928	1000 to 9999	Jun 1959 – Apr 1960	1 to 9998	Apr 1982 – Feb 1993		
AZ	1 to 9999	Feb 1928 – Nov 1932	1 to 9999	Apr 1960 – Mar 1961	1001 to 9998	Feb 1993 – Mar 1999		
CZ	1 to 9999	Nov 1932 – Oct 1935	1 to 9999	Mar 1961 – Apr 1962	1001 to 9998	Mar 1999 – Sep 2004		
EZ	1 to 9999	Oct 1935 – Oct 1938	1 to 9999	Apr 1962 – Apr 1963	1001 to 9998	Sep 2004 – Sep 2009		
FZ	1 to 9999	Oct 1938 – May 1942	1 to 9999	Apr 1963 – Jan 1964	1001 to 9998	Sep 2009 – Nov 2015		
GZ	1 to 9999	May 1942 – Dec 1947	1 to 9999	Jan 1964 – Sep 1964	1001 to 9998	Nov 2015 – Feb 2023		
MZ	1 to 9999	Dec 1947 – Jun 1950	1 to 9999	Sep 1964 – May 1965	1001 to 9998	Feb 2023 – current		
OZ	1 to 9999	Jun 1950 – Jan 1953	1 to 9999	May 1965 – Mar 1966	1001 to 9998	Likely next		
PZ	1 to 9999	Jan 1953 – Aug 1954	1 to 9999	Mar 1966 – Jan 1967				
TZ	1 to 9999	Aug 1954 – Oct 1955	1 to 9999	Jan 1967 – Oct 1967	(Note: Since 2013, the LTZ series has been used by Transport for London for its New Routemaster buses, which are built in Northern Ireland.)	Mid-2013 – current		
UZ	1 to 9999	Oct 1955 – Mar 1957	1 to 9999	Oct 1967 (Note: A batch of reverse UZ was issued early in July 1967 for Belfast City Transport.) – Jun 1968				
WZ	1 to 9999	Mar 1957 – Jun 1958	1 to 9999	Jun 1968 – Apr 1969				
County Down / Downpatrick
IJ	1 to 9999 (Note: IJ 1-100 were mixed allocations to all types of vehicles, but thereafter there was a period when motorcycles were segregated in blocks; the following were the motorcycle blocks: IJ 101-150, 201-249, 301-350, 451-500, 551-600, 651-700, 751-800, 851-950, 1001-1100, 1151-1200 and 1251 up, (no information thereafter). Other vehicles took the remaining numbers, but 1000-1050 were, in fact, duplicated.)	Dec 1903 – Apr 1930	101 to 9999	Oct 1958 – May 1961	1 to 9998 (Note: Authority transferred from Down County Council to Downpatrick LVLO/VRO from 1 January 1974; the first registration following the transfer was in the early FIJ series.) (Note: XIJ ended at 3439 due to computerisation in October 1986, followed by YIJ 101.)	May 1967 – May 1987	1001 to 9998	Likely next
BZ	1 to 9999	Apr 1930 – Oct 1946	201 to 9999	May 1961 – Nov 1963	101 to 9998	May 1987 – Sep 2000		
JZ	1 to 9999	Oct 1946 – Aug 1954	201 to 9999	Nov 1963 – Jul 1965	1001 to 9998	Sep 2000 – Nov 2016		
SZ	1 to 9999	Aug 1954 – Oct 1958	1 to 9999	Jul 1965 – May 1967	1001 to 9998	Nov 2016 – current		
County Fermanagh / Enniskillen
IL	1 to 9999	Jan 1904 – Feb 1958	51 to 9999	Feb 1958 – Aug 1966	1001 to 9998 (Note: Authority transferred from Fermanagh County Council to Enniskillen LVLO/VRO from 1 January 1974; the first registration following the transfer was in the late AIL series.) (Note: EIL ended at 2423 due to computerisation in October 1986, followed by FIL 101.)	Aug 1966 – Dec 2004	1001 to 9998	Likely next
IG	1001 to 9998	Dec 2004 – current (Note: Used for imported classic vehicles.)			1001 to 9998	Dec 2004 – current		
County Londonderry / Coleraine
IW	1 to 9999	Dec 1903 – Jan 1949	100 to 9999	Sep 1962 – Oct 1966	1 to 9998 (Note: Authority transferred from Londonderry County Council to Coleraine LVLO/VRO from 1 January 1974; the first registration following the transfer was in the early AIW series.) (Note: HIW incomplete due to computerisation in October 1986 (highest normal issue unknown), followed by IIW 101.)	Oct 1973 – Jul 2000	1001 to 9998	Likely next
NZ	1 to 9999	Jan 1949 – Dec 1957	1 to 9999	Oct 1966 – Nov 1970	1001 to 9998	Jul 2000 – Jan 2020		
YZ	1 to 9999	Dec 1957 – Sep 1962	1 to 9999	Nov 1970 – Oct 1973	1001 to 9998	Jan 2020 – current		
Londonderry County Borough / Derry City
UI	1 to 9999	Jan 1904 – Aug 1963	100 to 9999	Aug 1963 – Apr 1973	1 to 9998 (Note: Authority transferred from Londonderry County Borough Council to Londonderry LVLO/VRO from 1 January 1974; the first registration following the transfer was AUI 1110.) (Note: CUI ended at 7388 due to computerisation in October 1986, followed by DUI 101.)	Apr 1973 – Oct 2023		
VI					1001 to 9998	Oct 2023 – current		
County Tyrone / Omagh
JI	1 to 9999	Dec 1903 – Feb 1944	100 to 9999	Apr 1961 – Oct 1964	1 to 9998 (Note: Authority transferred from Tyrone County Council to Omagh LVLO/VRO from 1 January 1974; the first registration following the transfer was BJI 800.) (Note: JJI ended at 4700 due to computerisation in October 1986, followed by KJI 101.)	Jun 1971 – Dec 1999		
HZ	1 to 9999	Feb 1944 – Apr 1956	200 to 9999	Oct 1964 – Mar 1968	1001 to 9998	Dec 1999 – Jun 2021		
VZ	1 to 9999	Apr 1956 – Apr 1961	200 to 9999	Mar 1968 – Jun 1971	1001 to 9998	Jun 2021 – current		

=== Current issue per administrative county / DVA licensing local office ===
The current three-letter sequence issued by each DVA licensing local office:

Code	County or City	First Issued
YRZ	Ballymena	July 2026
WXZ	Armagh	August 2026
NMZ	Belfast City	November 2026
KSZ	Downpatrick	February 2026
YIG	Enniskillen	December 2024
EYZ	Coleraine	April 2026
BVI	Derry City	July 2025
DVZ	Omagh	October 2026

(Updated: November 2026)

=== Three-letter sequences not issued ===
The following sequences were deemed inappropriate and will never be issued:

County or City	Codes
Ballymena	ARZ
Enniskillen	KIL NIG PIG (Note: CIG was deemed inappropriate and was not issued in sequence. However, the combination has since been issued in DVLA Auctions.)
Derry City	FUI

The following sequences were never issued:

County or City	Codes
Belfast City	IOI OOI (Note: NAZ was deemed inappropriate and was not issued in sequence. However, the combination has since been issued in DVLA Auctions, but NAZ 1-199 are withheld.)

== See also ==
- Vehicle registration plates of the United Kingdom
- Vehicle registration plates of the Republic of Ireland
