= London Buses route 15 =

London bus route

15
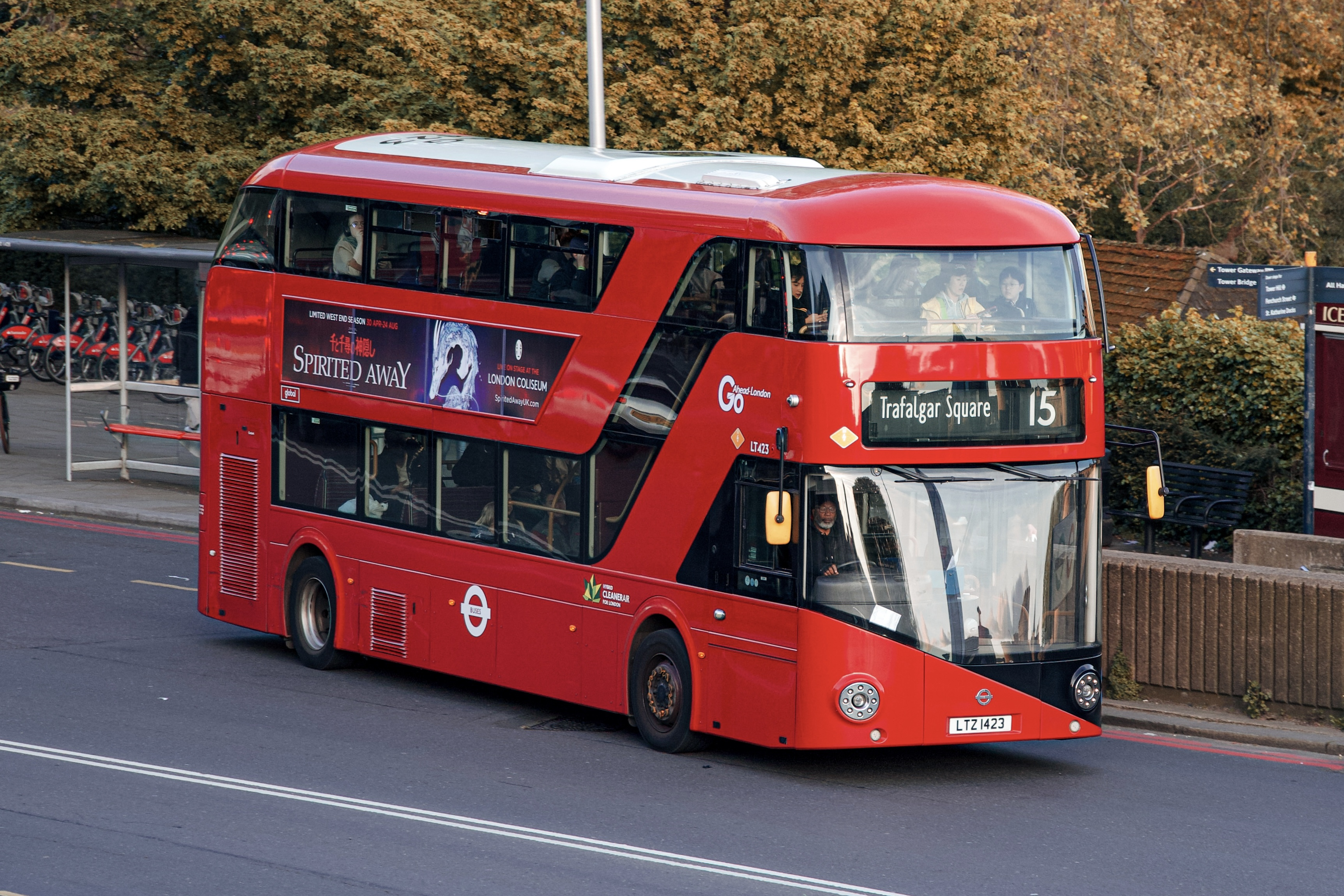
- Blue Triangle New Routemaster at the Tower of London in April 2024

Overview
- Operator: Blue Triangle (Go-Ahead London)
- Garage: Henley Road; River Road
- Vehicle: New Routemaster
- Peak vehicle requirement: 14
- Predecessors: Route 23
- Night-time: Night Bus N15

Route
- Start: Blackwall station
- Via: Aldgate; Tower of London; Cannon Street; St. Paul's; Aldwych
- End: Charing Cross station
- Length: 7 miles (11 km)

Service
- Level: Daily
- Frequency: About every 10-12 minutes
- Journey time: 38-75 minutes
- Operates: 05:25 until 01:14

London Buses route 15 is a Transport for London contracted bus route in London, England. Running between Blackwall and Charing Cross stations, it is operated by Go-Ahead London subsidiary Blue Triangle.

Short workings of route 15 were provided by route 15H with traditional AEC Routemaster buses between 2005 and 2019.

== History ==
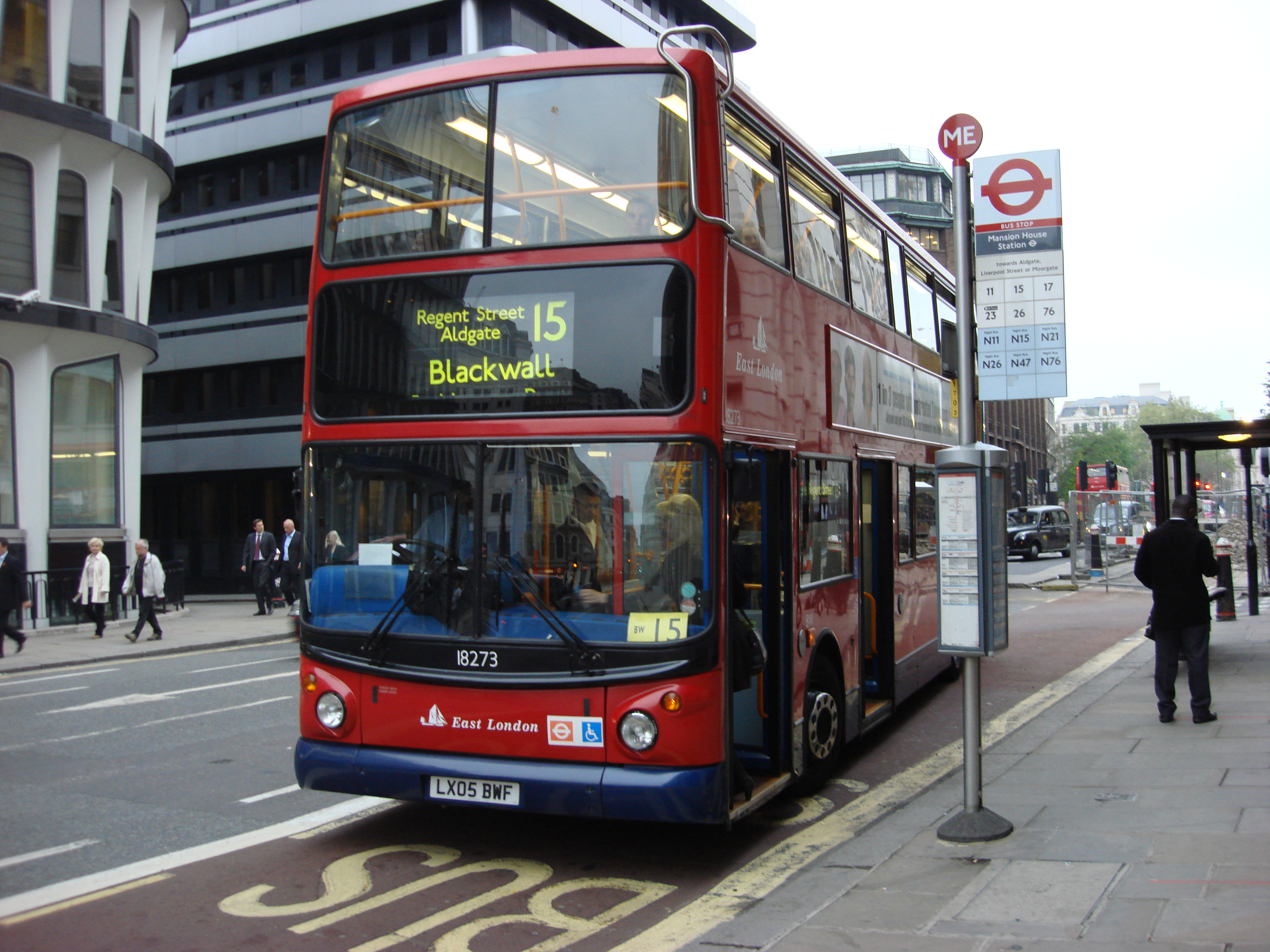
A Dennis Trident 2 double-decker operated by East London on route 15 at Mansion House station, April 2007

Route 15 was introduced in November 1908 between Shepherd's Bush and East Ham. On 16 December 1909, LGOC X-type buses were introduced to the route, running between Putney and Plaistow. In 1914 it was extended to Putney Common, with a Sunday extension eastwards to Plaistow. By 1921 route 15 had been cut back to Ladbroke Grove, extending in the east to Barking and North Woolwich on weekdays. A Sunday extension from Ladbroke Grove to Acton Vale was launched, and the North Woolwich journeys were diverted to Becontree Heath.

In May 1949, Leyland Titan RTWs were introduced on route 15. By November 1949, the route ran on from Ladbroke Grove to Poplar (Blackwall Tunnel), extending to East Ham during Monday to Friday peak hours and evenings, and all day on Saturdays and Sundays, with a further Sunday extension to Kew. From January 1967 journeys to Kensal Rise were introduced, and in October 1969 the route was suspended between Acton and Kew, being reinstated in 1970. In May 1975 the Sunday service was rerouted to Richmond bus station. In May 1985, the route was diverted to serve Cannon Street and the Tower of London. In June 1987 the Sunday service was converted to one-man operation.

On 15 March 1989 an express commuter service named The Beckton Express and numbered X15 began operating between Beckton and Aldwych using former London Country AEC Routemasters. This ceased on 22 November 1991.

On 18 July 1992, the Monday to Saturday service was withdrawn between Ladbroke Grove and Paddington, being replaced by new route 23. In May 1993 this section was withdrawn on Sundays, and in September 1999 route 15 was withdrawn between Poplar and Canning Town, with buses diverted to serve Blackwall station. In August 2003 the route was withdrawn between Blackwall and East Ham.

Alexander ALX400 bodied Dennis Trident 2 double deckers were introduced on 30 August 2003 to replace the AEC Routemasters when the route was converted to one-person operation.

On 26 February 2006, it was announced that route 15 would be extended from Paddington to Paddington Basin over the reconstructed Bishop's Bridge; the previous bridge was not considered strong enough to take buses. Although the reconstructed bridge opened in June 2006, this extension was continuously deferred, with the extension eventually taking place on 13 October 2007, in order to free up stand space at Paddington for the newly introduced route 332.

Route 15 was transferred to West Ham garage on 27 June 2009. The route was withdrawn between Paddington Basin and Regent Street on 28 August 2010 as part of Transport for London's policy of reducing the number of buses using Oxford Street in order to ease congestion and pollution. Route 159 was extended along the withdrawn section of the route between Marble Arch and Paddington Basin. It was also further shortened to Trafalgar Square in May 2013.

Alexander Dennis Enviro400H double deckers were introduced in January 2012. New Routemasters were introduced on 28 February 2015. When next tendered, the route was awarded to Go-Ahead London subsidiary Blue Triangle who commenced operations on 26 August 2017.

== Heritage route ==
In November 2005, route 15 was selected as one of two routes to operate short workings of their normal route using AEC Routemasters with route 15H initially operating daily between Trafalgar Square and Tower Hill station before being scaled back in March 2019 to run on weekends and public holidays from late March to late September only.

The service operated between November 2005 and September 2019. It did not run in 2020 due to the COVID-19 pandemic and was permanently withdrawn at the end of its contract in November of that year.

== Current route ==
Route 15 operates via these primary locations:

- Blackwall station
- Poplar
- All Saints station
- Limehouse station
- Shadwell
- Aldgate East station
- Aldgate station
- Tower Hill station
- Monument station
- Cannon Street station
- Mansion House station
- City Thameslink station
- Fetter Lane
- Aldwych
- Charing Cross station
