= London Buses route 5 =

London bus route

5
- Blue Triangle New Routemaster at Canning Town bus station in October 2026

Overview
- Operator: Blue Triangle (Go-Ahead London)
- Garage: River Road; Henley Road
- Vehicle: New Routemaster
- Peak vehicle requirement: 30
- Began service: 11 November 1959
- Former operator: Stagecoach London
- Night-time: Night Bus N15

Route
- Start: Canning Town bus station
- Via: Plaistow; Upton Park; East Ham; Barking; Becontree
- End: Romford Market
- Length: 10 miles (16 km)

Service
- Level: Daily
- Frequency: About every 6-10 minutes
- Journey time: 43-82 minutes
- Operates: 05:30 until 01:00
- Annual patronage: 11.3 million (2018/19)

London Buses route 5 is a Transport for London contracted bus route in London, England. Running between Canning Town bus station and Romford Market, it is operated by Go-Ahead London subsidiary Blue Triangle.

== History ==
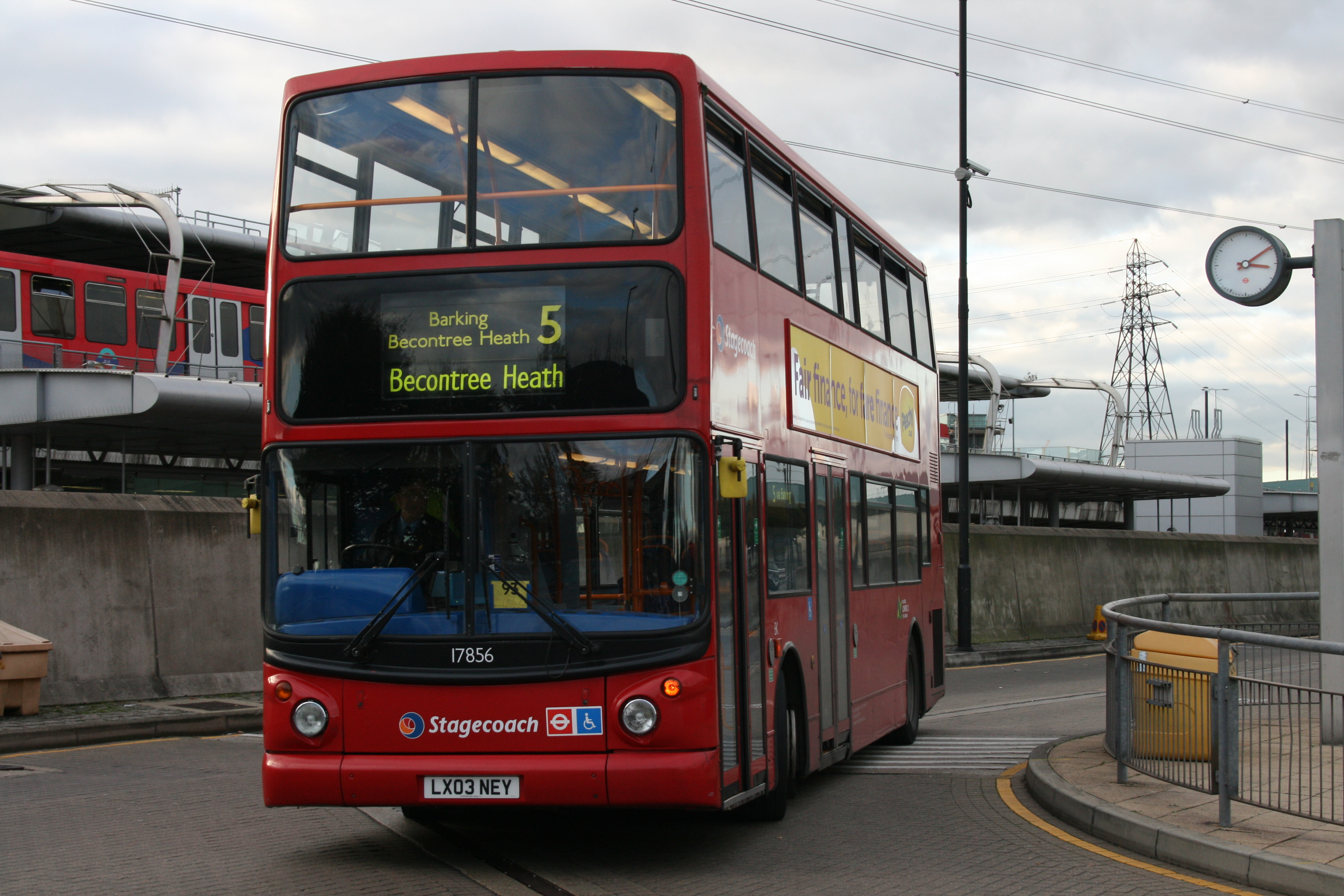
Stagecoach London TransBus ALX400 bodied TransBus Trident at Canning Town bus station in October 2014

Route number 5 was used for an experimental service which ran between November 1953 and May 1954. The route, which ran from Shepherd's Bush Green to Ladbroke Grove, was withdrawn due to low ridership.

The current route 5 was introduced on 11 November 1959 as a replacement for trolleybus routes 567 and 665 between East Ham and Bloomsbury being operated by AEC Routemasters. On 17 April 1971 it was converted to one man operation with Daimler Fleetlines introduced.

Having been altered to operate between Becontree Heath bus station and Canning Town bus station, from privatisation it was operated by East London. On 25 March 2006 it was extended east to Romford Market replacing route 87. On 14 May 2011, the last AEC Routemaster, RML2760 built, operated a special service for charity on route 5 between Romford and Barking.

Upon being re-tendered it passed to Blue Triangle on 26 August 2017. On the same date it was altered in Romford to serve Queen's Hospital. The route is operated out of River Road and Henley Road garages.

== Current route ==
Route 5 operates via these primary locations:

- Canning Town bus station
- Plaistow
- Upton Park
- East Ham Newham Town Hall
- Barking station
- Becontree Martins Corner
- Becontree Heath Leisure Centre
- Queen's Hospital
- Romford station
- Romford Market
