= Blue Triangle =

Bus company operating services in East London

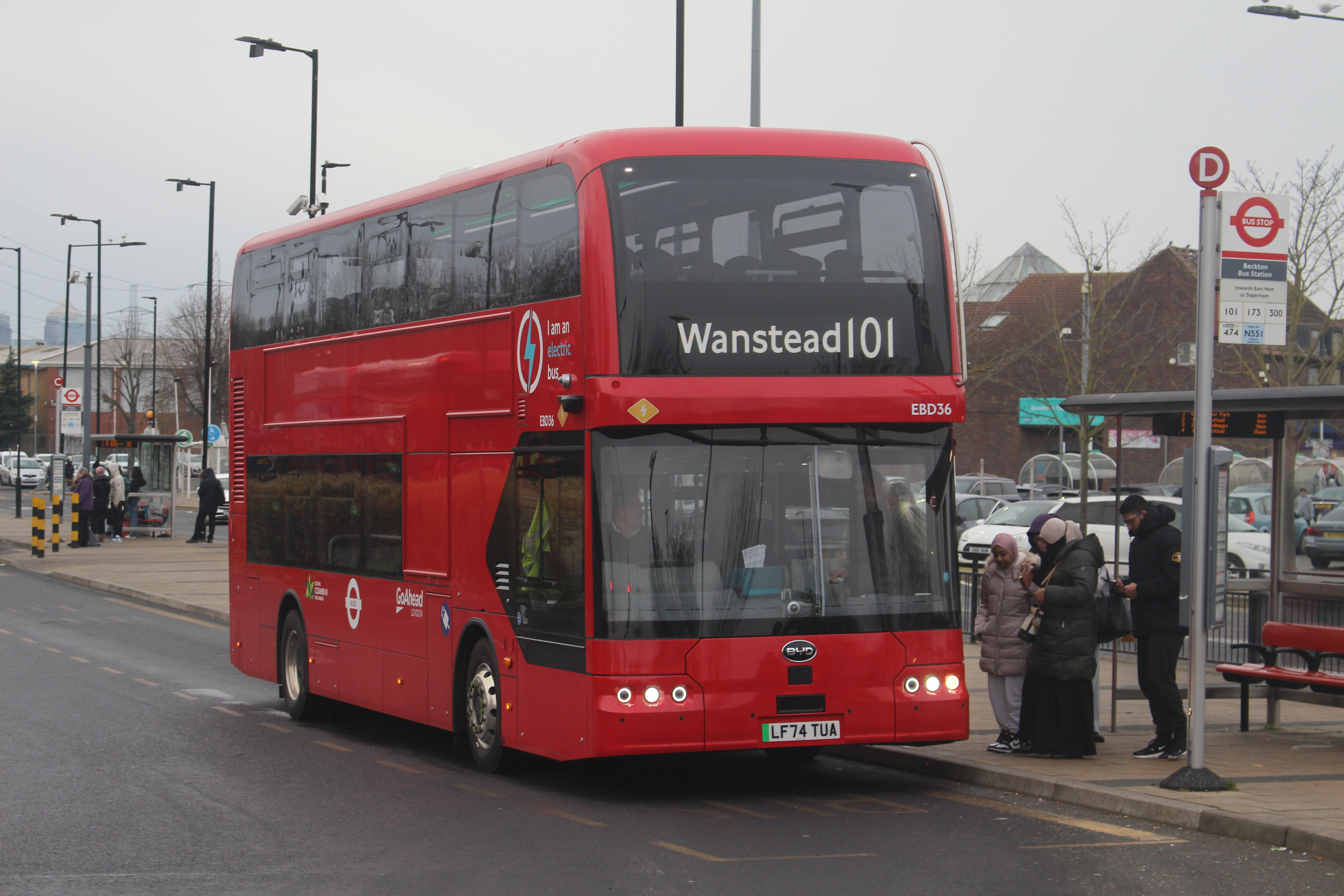
- BYD BD11 on route 101 at Beckton bus station in January 2025
- Parent: Go-Ahead London
- Founded: 1999
- Headquarters: Barking
- Service area: East London
- Service type: Bus operator
- Routes: 26
- Hubs: Barking, Barking Riverside, Canning Town, Beckton
- Depots: 2
- Fuel type: Diesel, Hybrid and Electric
- Website: www.goaheadlondon.com

Blue Triangle is a bus operator brand under London General Transport Services Limited, trading as Go-Ahead London. It is a subsidiary of Go-Ahead London and operates services in East London under contract to Transport for London. It is the operator of the East London Transit system.

== History ==
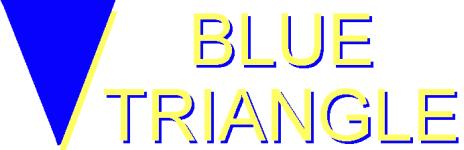
Original Blue Triangle logo

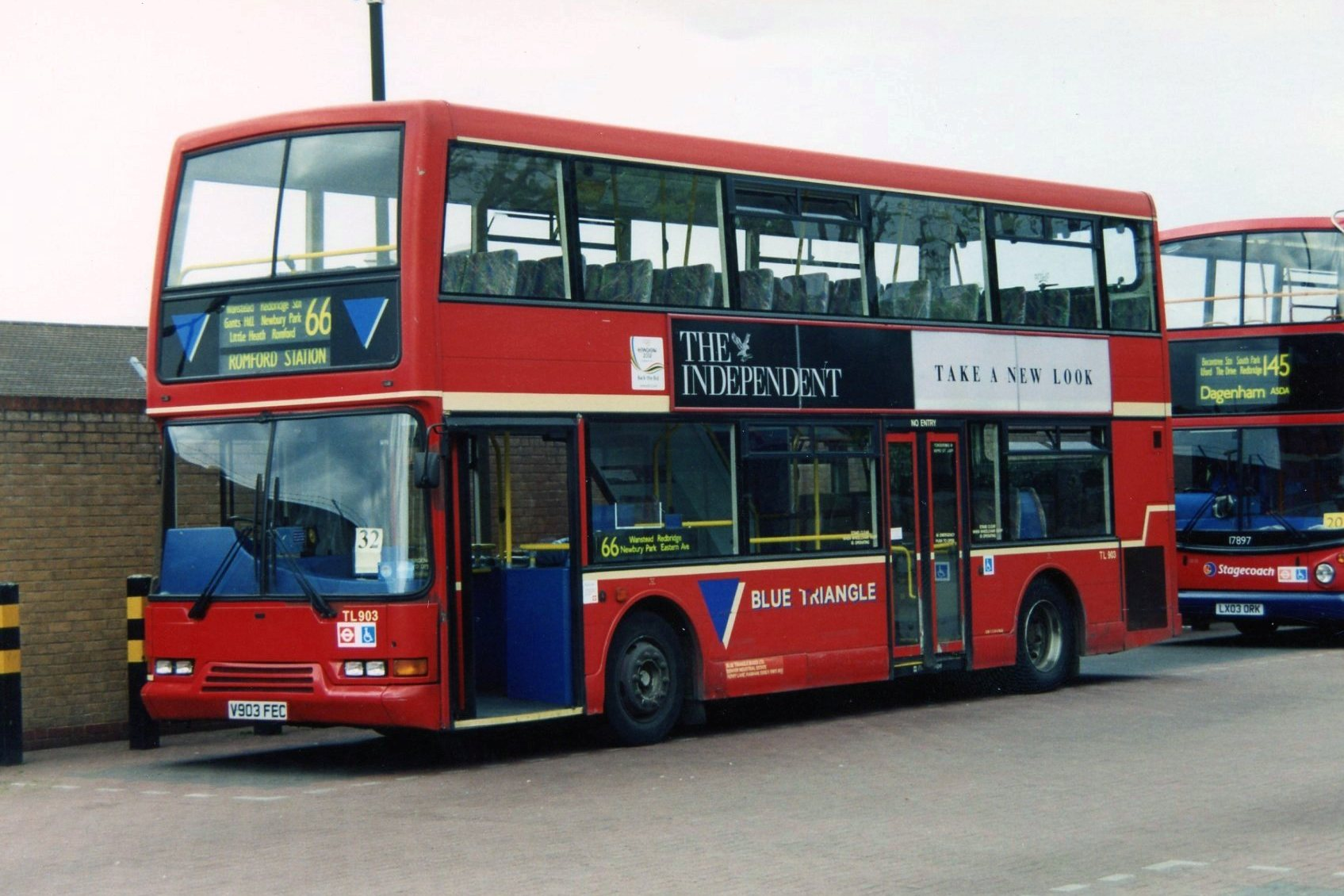
East Lancs Lolyne bodied Dennis Trident 2

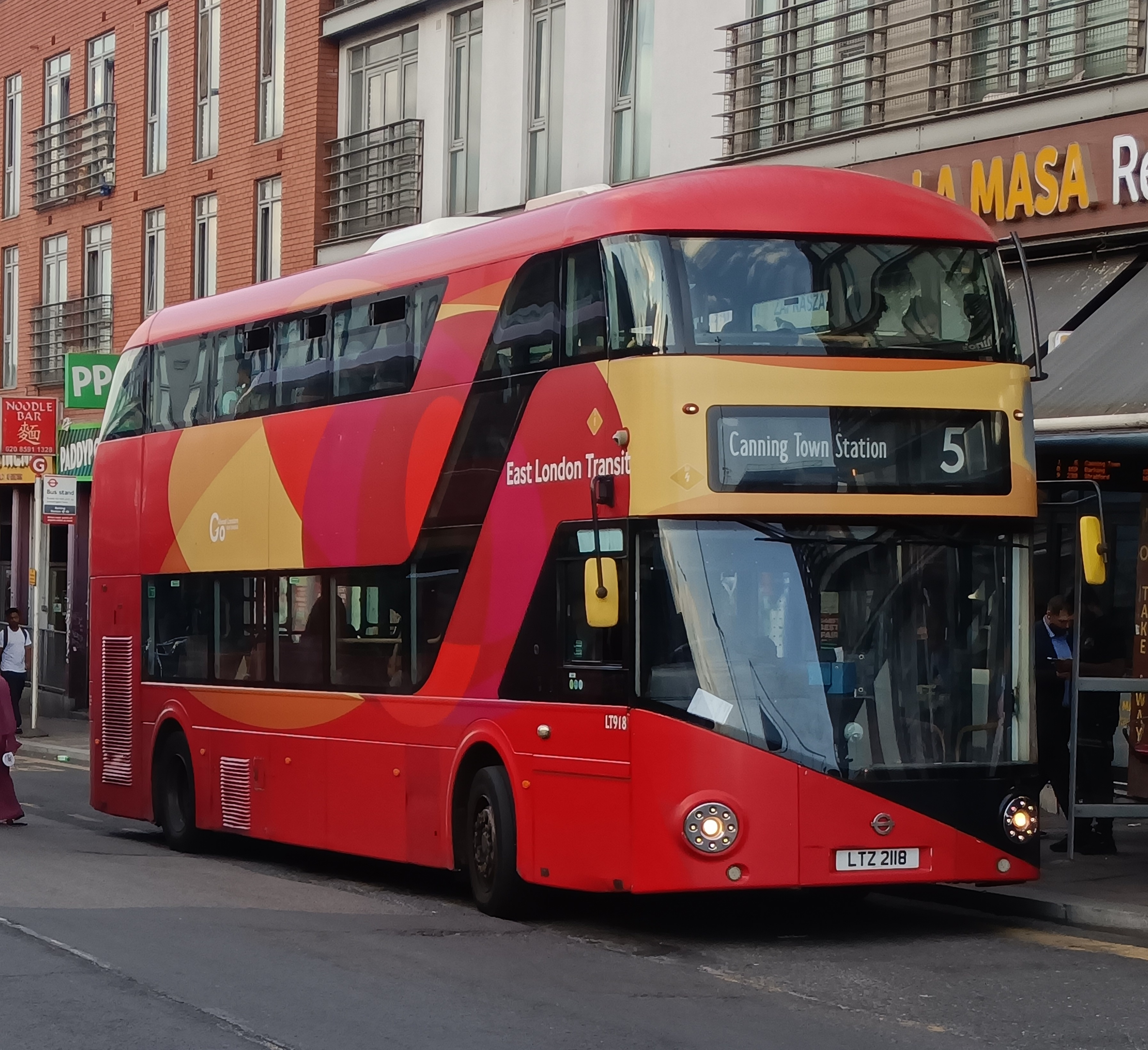
New Routemaster with East London Transit branding on route 5 at Barking station in July 2025

Wright Gemini 3 bodied Volvo B5LH on route 104 at Beckton bus station in July 2025

In August 2002, Blue Triangle took over route 185 at short notice after London Easylink ceased trading.

On 29 June 2007, Blue Triangle was purchased by the Go-Ahead Group. The sale included eight Transport for London and nine Essex County Council routes and approximately 60 buses, but not the charter fleet which were retained by Roger Wright trading as The London Bus Company.

== Garages ==
=== River Road (RR) ===
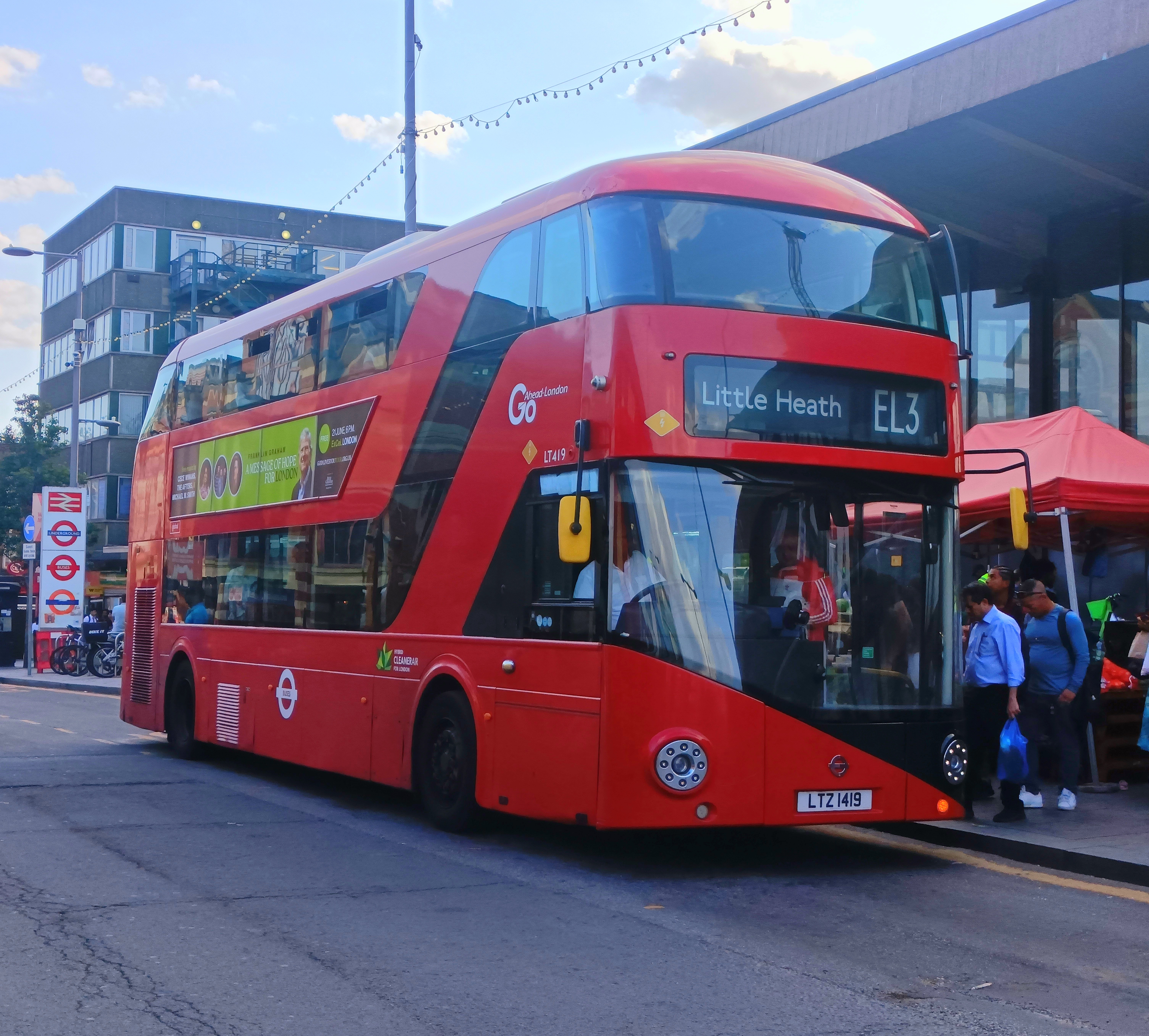
The East London Transit routes, operated using New Routemasters, are operated from River Road garage

River Road garage operates routes 5, 15, 101, 104, 115, 147, 262, 300, 304, 325, 364, 366, 368, 396, EL1, EL2, EL3 and N15.

==== History ====
In May 2016 a new garage opened on River Road in Barking. It initially opened with an allocation of 22 buses to operate route 147 but has a capacity for 155 buses. It was built on the site of a former Ford commercial vehicle sales and repair site. In July 2016, all of the routes and buses from Rainham garage were transferred.

=== Henley Road (DS) ===
Henley Road garage operates routes 5, 15, 69, 115, 129, 330, 376, 473, 474, D3, N15 and SL4.

== Former garage ==
=== Rainham (BE) ===
Rainham garage operated routes 167, 193, 300, 347, 362, 364, 368, 376, 462, 498, 608, 646, 648, 649, 650, 651, 652, 656, 667, 674, 679, 686, EL1, EL2 and W19. On 27 June 2015, route 498 passed to Stagecoach London. In July 2016 the garage was announced closed with all operations transferred to River Road garage.

== Previous routes operated ==
- Route 372 was won on a temporary contract as part replacement for route 324 which ran between Romford Market and Bluewater Shopping Centre. Blue Triangle was awarded the temporary contract using four second hand Plaxton Pointer bodied Dennis Darts. In March 2004, Blue Triangle retained the contract for another five years. This route has since passed to Stagecoach London.
- In 2001 Blue Triangle commenced operating route 248. In September 2008, the passed to Stagecoach London.
- Route 375 was won on a temporary contract as a part replacement to Essex County Council route 500, which was withdrawn between Ongar and Romford, Transport for London stepped in with this replacement service using just one bus. On 4 July 2009 this passed to Arriva Kent Thameside.
- In September 2003 Blue Triangle commenced operating route 66. In September 2010 this passed to Arriva Southern Counties.
- On 3 November 2007 Blue Triangle commenced operating route 368. On 26 March 2011 this passed to First London but was re-acquired on 22 June 2013.
- In September 2001 Blue Triangle commenced operating route 648. On 3 September 2011 this route passed to First London but was re-acquired on 22 June 2013.
- In March 2012 Blue Triangle commenced operating route 20.

== Special vehicles ==
Blue Triangle owned a number of special vehicles including an ex Green Line AEC Routemaster, ex London Routemasters and AEC Regent III RTs for use on charter duties. These vehicles were not included in the sale to Go-Ahead Group and remain in the ownership of Roger Wright's London Bus Company.

== Fleet ==
As at May 2015, Blue Triangle's London services had a peak vehicle requirement of 131 buses.
