= New Routemaster =

Hybrid diesel–electric double-decker bus

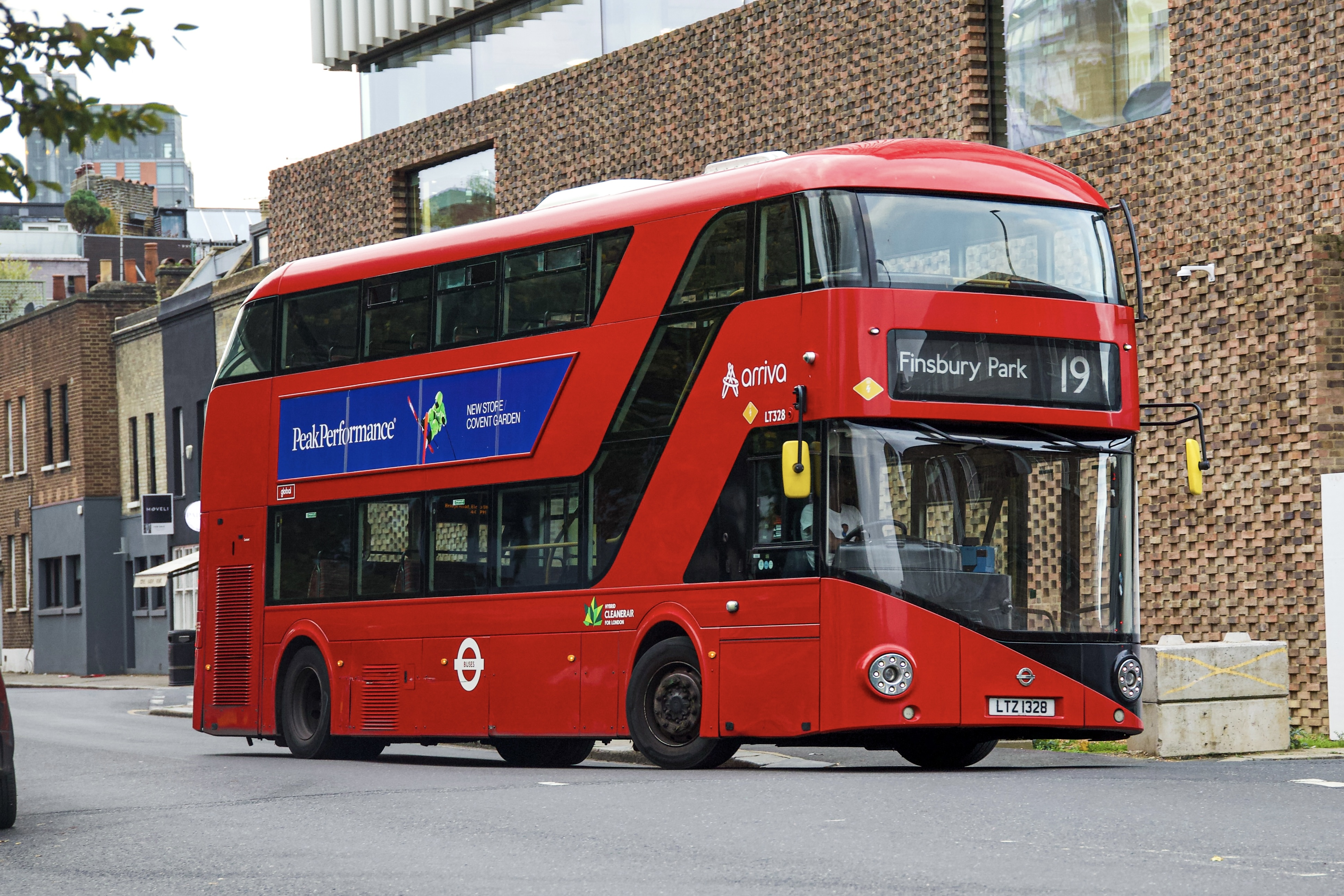
- Arriva London New Routemaster at Battersea in 2024

Overview
- Manufacturer: Wrightbus
- Production: 2011–2017; 1,000 units produced
- Designer: Thomas Heatherwick

Body and chassis
- Doors: 3 doors
- Floor type: Low-floor

Powertrain
- Engine: Cummins ISBe 4.5 (euro spec); 4-cylinder, 4.5 L (270 cu in), 185 hp (138 kW) Euro V compliant
- Capacity: 80 (87 without wheelchair) (lower: 22 seats, 1 wheelchair space, 18 standing (25 standing without wheelchair); upper deck: 40 seats)
- Transmission: Diesel in series 18 kWh Microvast Lithium Titanate battery, Microvast LpTO, Siemens ELFA2 electric traction motor

Dimensions
- Length: 11.23 m (36 ft 10 1/8 in)
- Width: 2.52 m (8 ft 3 1/4 in)
- Height: 4.39 m (14 ft 4 7/8 in)
- Curb weight: 12.65 t (12.45 long tons; 13.94 short tons)

Chronology
- Predecessor: AEC Routemaster (spiritual)
- Successor: Wright SRM; BYD B series

The New Routemaster, originally referred to as the New Bus for London and colloquially as the Borismaster or Boris Bus, is a low-floor hybrid diesel–electric double-decker bus operated in London, England. Designed by Heatherwick Studio and manufactured by Wrightbus, it is notable for featuring a "hop-on hop-off" rear open platform similar to the original Routemaster bus design but updated to meet requirements for modern buses to be fully accessible. It first entered service in February 2012 with Arriva London on route 38.

The original AEC Routemaster was used as the standard London bus type, with a rear open platform and crewed by both a driver and conductor. After half a century, it was withdrawn from service at the end of 2005 (except for two heritage routes which operated until 2014 and 2019 respectively), in favour of a fully accessible one-man-operated modern fleet (including articulated buses), none of which featured a rear open platform. The withdrawal of the Routemaster became an issue during the 2008 London mayoral election with Boris Johnson elected mayor with a campaign pledge to introduce a new Routemaster. Following an open design competition in 2008, Wrightbus was awarded the contract to build the bus at the end of 2009, and the final design was announced in May 2010.

The design for the new double-decker bus was inspired by the original AEC Routemaster and features three doors and two staircases to allow accessible boarding. Unlike the AEC Routemaster, the new bus has a full front end rather than the protruding, bonneted "half cab" design, and a rear platform with a door that can be closed, rather than being permanently open. The layout of the new bus allows it to be operated by the driver alone. The cost of each bus was £355,000 over the four-year procurement period. The last of the 1,000 New Routemasters was delivered in December 2017.

== Configuration ==
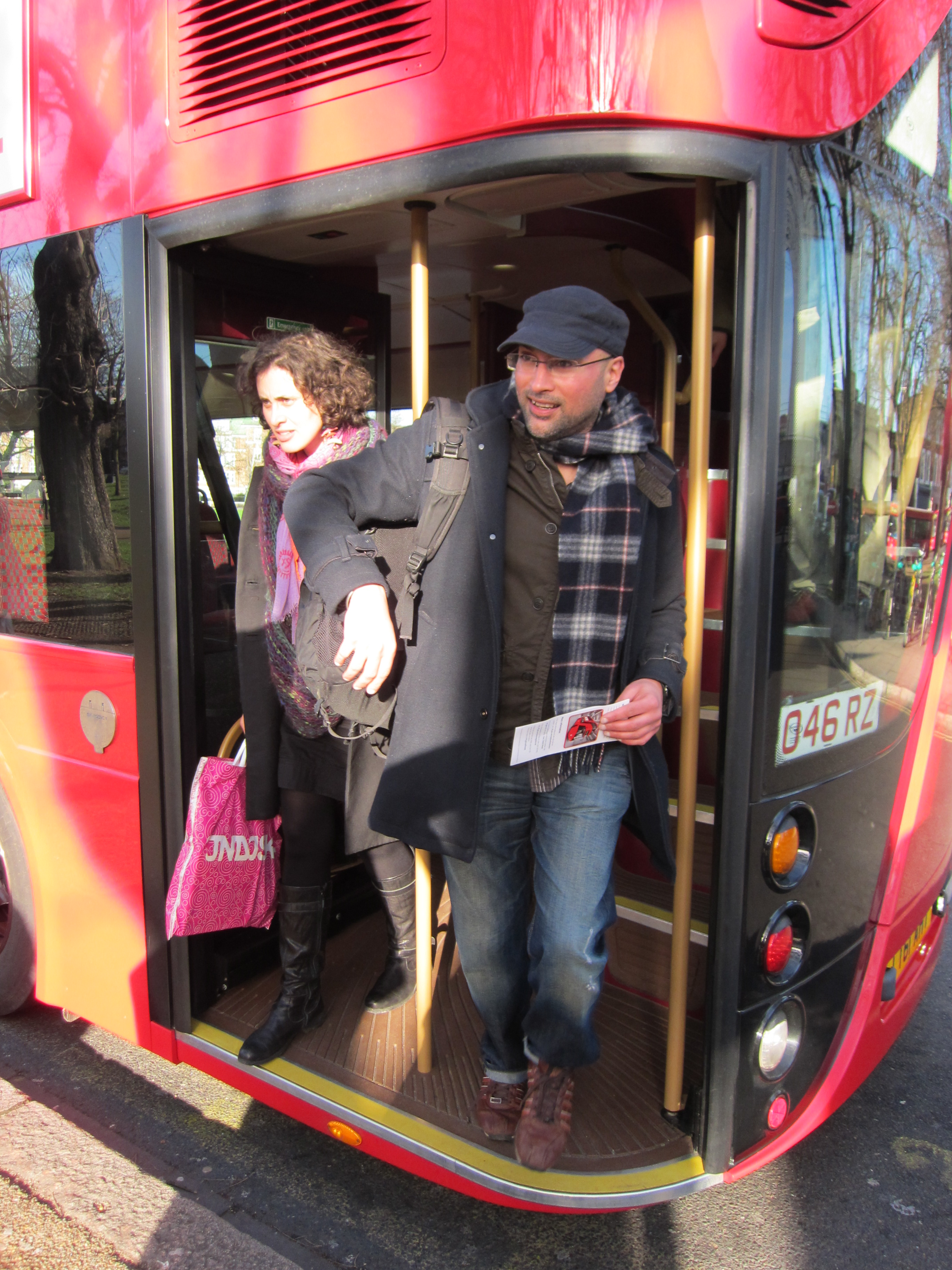
Passengers alighting from the rear platform in 2012

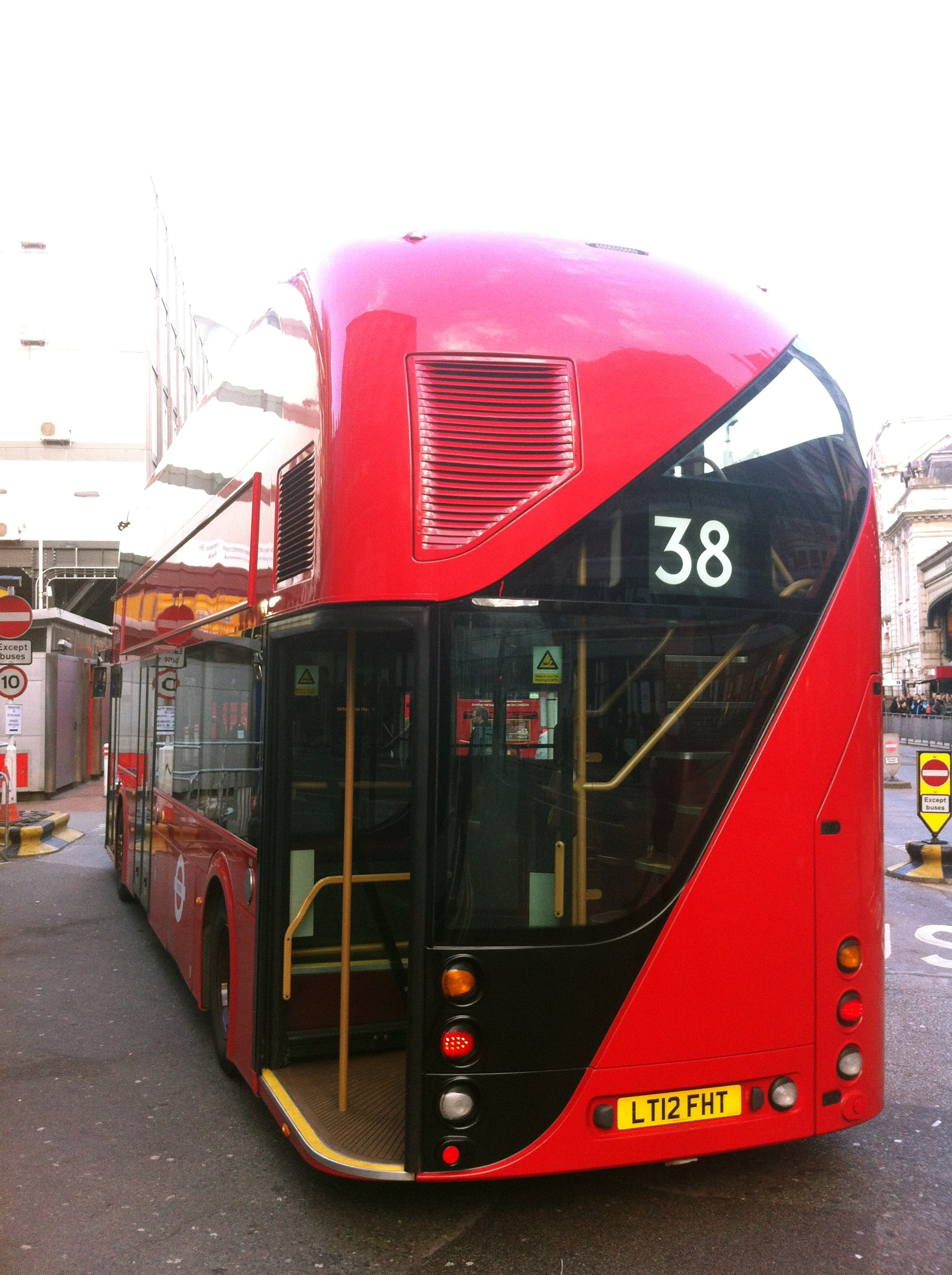
Curved rear as inspired by the AEC Routemaster

The final design has doors at the front, centre and rear. The front and rear doors lead to staircases to the upper deck. The rear entrance initially had a platform and pole similar to the original Routemaster, with a door kept open for hop-on, hop-off operation when a conductor was on board. Readers for the contactless Oyster card used for payment for transport in London are provided at each of the three boarding points. Other types of tickets must be presented to the driver. This applied even when a conductor was on board, as the conductors did not take fares or check tickets.

There is a new pattern of moquette for the seating, manufactured by Camira Fabrics. The internal lighting is provided by LED clusters, and there is a computer-controlled ventilation system but no air conditioning. There is a system to display text and provide audio announcements via loudspeakers, and T-loop for users of hearing aids; the information typically includes the route number, destination, name of the next stop and that the bus is stopping.

The bus is a hybrid diesel-electric driven by a battery-powered electric motor, charged by a diesel fuelled generator and recovering energy during braking by regenerative braking.

In 2020, Transport for London announced that the New Routemasters would be converted so passengers only enter by the front door, with the middle and rear doors becoming exit-only. This was done to reduce fare evasion, which had been double that of other London buses.

== Background ==
=== Original Routemaster in London ===
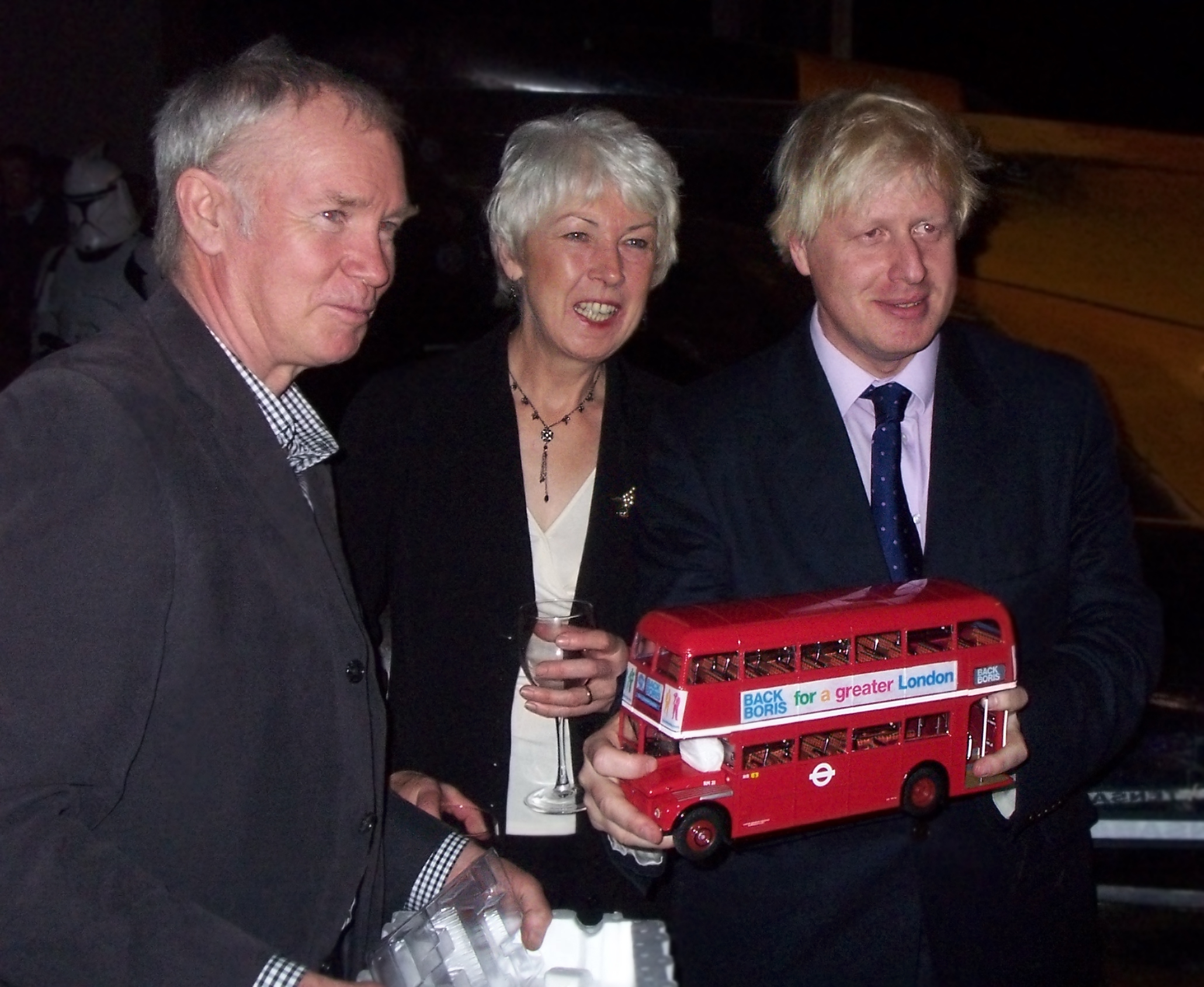
Boris Johnson with a model of an original AEC Routemaster bearing a political slogan during his 2008 London mayoral campaign

Designed for and largely operated in London, over 2,800 AEC Routemasters were built between 1956 and 1968, with a design so robust that the Routemaster outlasted newer buses intended to replace it, remaining in use until 2005, well into the deregulated era.

From 31 December 2000, it became mandatory for all new buses delivered in the UK to comply with the Disability Discrimination Act 1995, leading to the development of the wheelchair-accessible low-floor bus. Older buses were allowed to continue operating in London until 23 October 2009, and in the rest of the United Kingdom until 22 October 2014. Through the TfL contract renewal process, after 2000, the Routemaster began to be identified as the most common example of a non-wheelchair-accessible bus type used on TfL routes.

The first Mayor of London, Ken Livingstone, supported the Routemaster during his first (2000–2004) term, indicating the type would be retained in a limited capacity on contract renewals as before. He also promised to convert the whole London bus fleet to low-floor with an original targeted timeline of 23 October 2009, which then was pushed earlier to 1 January 2006, requiring the withdrawal of the Routemaster from London. Contributory factors to the withdrawal were said to be the risk of litigation over accidents arising from using the rear platform, the cost savings of one-person operation and the fact that passengers preferred the comfort levels of modern buses to the vintage Routemaster. Livingstone said that the Routemasters were too dangerous, with approximately twelve people per year dying after falling from them during his mayoralty. The last examples were withdrawn from regular London passenger service in December 2005.

The Routemaster continued in operation on heritage routes 9 and 15, with the former discontinued in July 2014. The heritage routes, shorter than the full 9 and 15 routes, were awarded as tendered routes by TfL and did not contravene the TfL accessible public transport policy requirement, as frequent wheelchair-accessible buses also operate on these routes. The provision of Routemaster buses was drastically curtailed on 2 March 2019 to availability on weekends only for 60 days a year. As of 2021, the heritage routes with Routemaster are withdrawn.

=== FRM and XRM ===
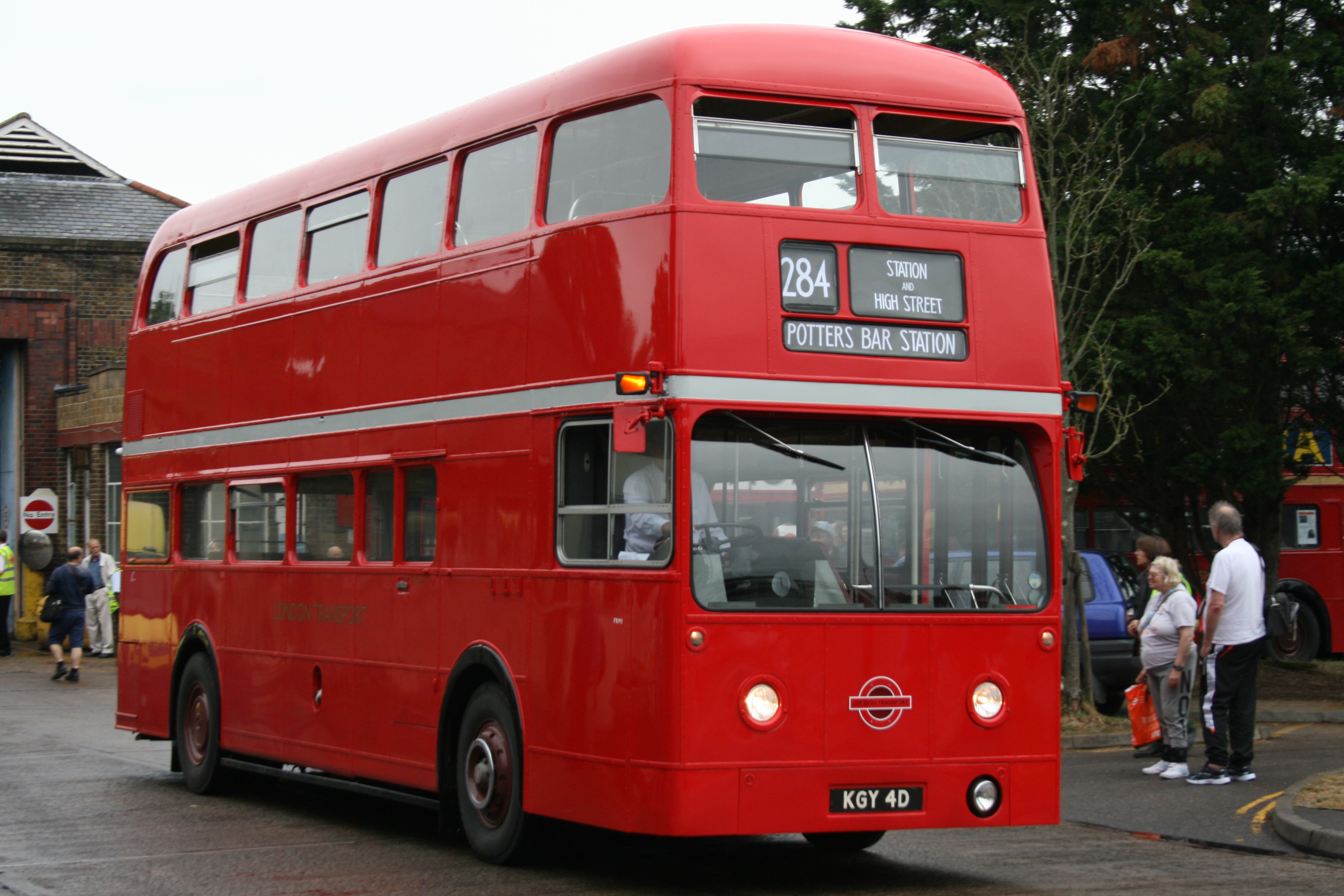
The front-entrance Routemaster prototype FRM1

An attempt to design a rear-engined front-entrance version of the Routemaster in 1964/65 led to the construction of the FRM1 (front-entrance Routemaster) in 1966. The prototype shared approximately 60% of its components with a standard Routemaster and was the first integrally-constructed rear-engined double-decker built in Britain. Because of its single door (a serious drawback for a bus of this capacity) and continued mechanical problems associated with its unique design, the FRM was considered a dead end although it provided proof of concept.

In 1968, London Transport went back to the drawing board for another replacement of the Routemaster, with an anticipated introduction date of 1985. The initial result was a four-axle low-floor design that would have been suitable for automatic fare collection. By 1975, the project was well in hand and had been named XRM (Experimental Route Master). Features of the new design included a side-mounted engine for maximum flexibility in door and seating layout and hydraulic drive to four small-wheeled axles for the lowest possible floor. Experiments in the mid-1970s yielded disappointing results, and in 1978, the XRM morphed into a more conventional-looking vehicle but with the rear door behind the rear axle. Other proposed features were LPG fuel and hydraulic suspension to lower the floor at stops. XRM design work was cancelled in September 1980, as it was calculated that it would cost £153 million to build 2,500 new XRMs but only £13.5 million to overhaul 2,700 Routemasters. London Transport had, by then, committed heavily to the Leyland Titan, to which they had significant design input and it was regarded as a more viable option.

A decade later, London Transport once again looked for a replacement. In 1989, designs were solicited from Dennis Bus, Alexander and Northern Counties. The style specified was a rear-entrance half-cab layout identical to the original Routemaster, but by now, it was considered obsolete elsewhere in Britain.

In 1999, London Transport received an unsolicited design from its former vehicle engineering manager, Colin Curtis, who had overseen the design of the Routemaster. Dubbed the Q Master, it found little favour within London Transport and by manufacturers that Curtis approached. Transport for London announced that it would look at developing a Routemaster replacement, but the project was confirmed as dead in June 2003.

== Design ==
=== Initial Capoco proposal ===
On 3 September 2007 the Conservative mayoral candidate for London, Boris Johnson, announced that he was contemplating introducing a modern-day Routemaster. In December 2007, the UK automotive magazine Autocar commissioned the bus designer Capoco, designer of the innovative Optare Solo, to come up with detailed proposals for a new-generation Routemaster. Their design, dubbed the RMXL, was a hybrid technology low-floor bus with a lightweight aluminium space frame, with four more seats and twice the standing capacity of the old Routemaster, and operated solely by a driver.

The design incorporated disabled access through a closing front door behind the front wheels while retaining open platform rear access, with the staircase still at the rear. The hybrid drivetrain had a front-mounted continuous-revving hydrogenised petrol engine; this charged front-mounted batteries, which powered the rear wheels through rear-mounted electric motors. This arrangement, through not requiring a mechanical transmission, allowed for a low floor and a step-free entrance into the lower deck from the rear platform.

Hydrogen storage tanks would be located under the rear staircase. The design was covered by the national press but attracted criticism from Livingstone as being too costly to justify and still not safe, despite proposals to monitor the rear platform with cameras.

=== New Bus for London competition ===
Johnson backed the Autocar / Capoco design in principle and suggested that he would hold a formal design competition to develop a new Routemaster if he was elected London mayor in May 2008. After winning, on 4 July 2008 Johnson announced the New Bus for London competition.

An initiative of Transport for London, the competition invited anybody, both companies and members of the public, to submit ideas for consideration. The competition had two categories, an Imagine category for general ideas and concepts, and a Design category, for more detailed proposals. In both categories, entries could be either "whole bus" submissions, or proposals for parts of the bus.

The Imagine category called for the submission of imaginative ideas for a red double-decker bus with a rear open platform, and one other entrance/exit with doors. The Design category called for detailed designs of a low-floor, red double-decker bus with at least one internal staircase, a rear open platform, and one other entrance/exit with doors, to be crewed by a driver and conductor, and suitable for carrying 72 passengers seated and standing. The designs were required to satisfy a table of mandatory and suggested design specifications, and "be practical and economic and capable of being put into mass production". The competition offered cash prizes for entrants, with £25,000 for the winner, and smaller awards for good ideas.

One initial set of proposals gained media attention after being unveiled during October 2008, for a "smiley bus" known as the H4 (designed by the H4 Group). Future Systems offered a "space age" alternative powered by hydrogen. Foster and Partners submitted a glass-roofed design. The winners were announced on 19 December 2008. There were 225 entries in the Design category, and 475 entries in the Imagine category

The £25,000 prize for winning the whole bus Design category was shared between two entries, one from Capoco Design, a bus, coach and truck design firm, and one from a joint submission made by architects Foster + Partners and automotive company Aston Martin.

=== Tendering process & final design ===
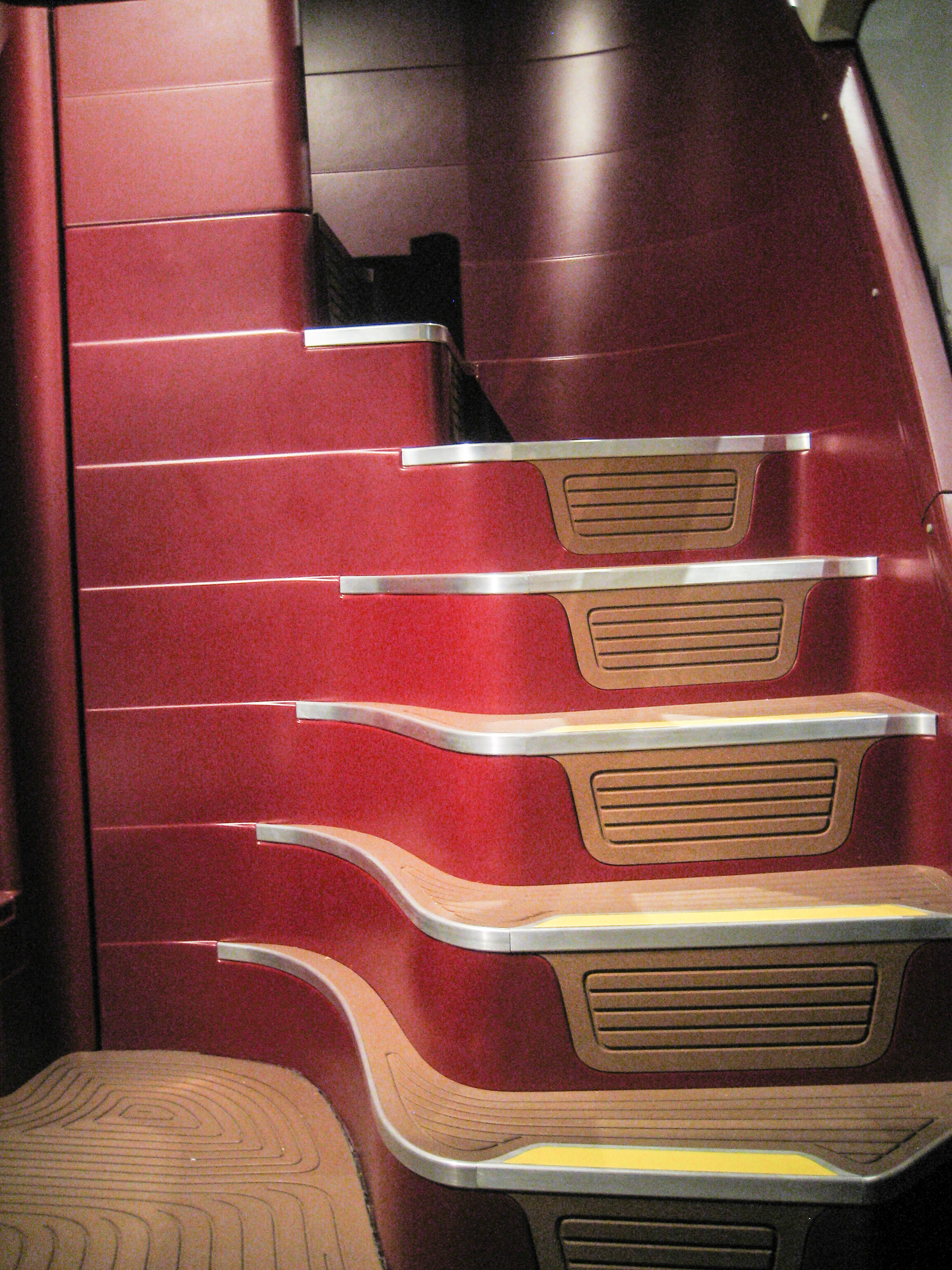
Rear spiral staircase

The winning and other merited entrants in both the Imagine and Design categories for both 'whole bus' submission and part submissions were passed by TfL to bus manufacturers, for them to draw up detailed final designs meeting all relevant legislation, and later presented to TfL for consideration on a competitive-tender basis. By April 2009, a formal invitation to express interest in the project was published in the Official Journal of the European Union.

In May 2009, six manufacturers were invited to negotiate the contract to design and build the new bus. They were Alexander Dennis, EvoBus (which includes Mercedes-Benz), Hispano Carrocera, Optare, Scania and Wrightbus, having all met TfL's criteria for pre-qualification for tendering, which included demonstrating they had a manufacturing capacity of building 600 buses over three years. Volvo Buses declined to enter the bidding process. Transport for London set a deadline of 14 August for the submission of detailed tenders; Scania and Evobus pulled out before this deadline. Scania did not believe they could produce the first prototype in the time stipulated, and Evobus had concerns as they were not at the time manufacturing any double-decker.

On 23 December 2009, Northern Ireland-based vehicle manufacturer Wrightbus was awarded the contract to build the Future Routemaster. The contract called for a bus with a capacity for at least 87 passengers, two staircases, three doors, and a rear platform which could be left open, or closed with a door when there was no conductor on board. The bus would be a hybrid, utilising technology to make it 40% more fuel-efficient than conventional diesel buses, and 15% more than London hybrid buses already in operation, reducing nitrogen oxide emissions by 40% and particulate matter by 33% compared with diesel buses.

On 17 May 2010, the final design was unveiled by Wrightbus, with asymmetric glass swoops as its signature "futuristic" styling feature. Transport for London and Wrightbus worked with Heatherwick Studio to produce the styling for Wrightbus' final design. TfL has applied to the Intellectual Property Office for Registered Design Protection for the exterior design.

The body has two diagonal glass windows from top to bottom decks, one curving around the rear, the other on the right-hand side towards the front, which provides natural light to the interiors of both staircases. The rear staircase is in the same position as in the original Routemaster, curving around the rear section, while the front staircase is straight, ascending on the right-hand side of the chassis over the driver's cab, opening out in the front of the upper deck.

The bus is certified to EC Whole Vehicle Type Approval and ECE Regulation 107, according to the manufacturers.

The use of three doors and two staircases is not new to London: London Transport evaluated a prototype bus in the 1980s as part of the Alternative Vehicle Evaluation programme: a specially modified Volvo Ailsa B55 with two staircases. These trials were curtailed due to the running-down and eventual closure of London Transport's bus Engineering Research department.

== Production ==
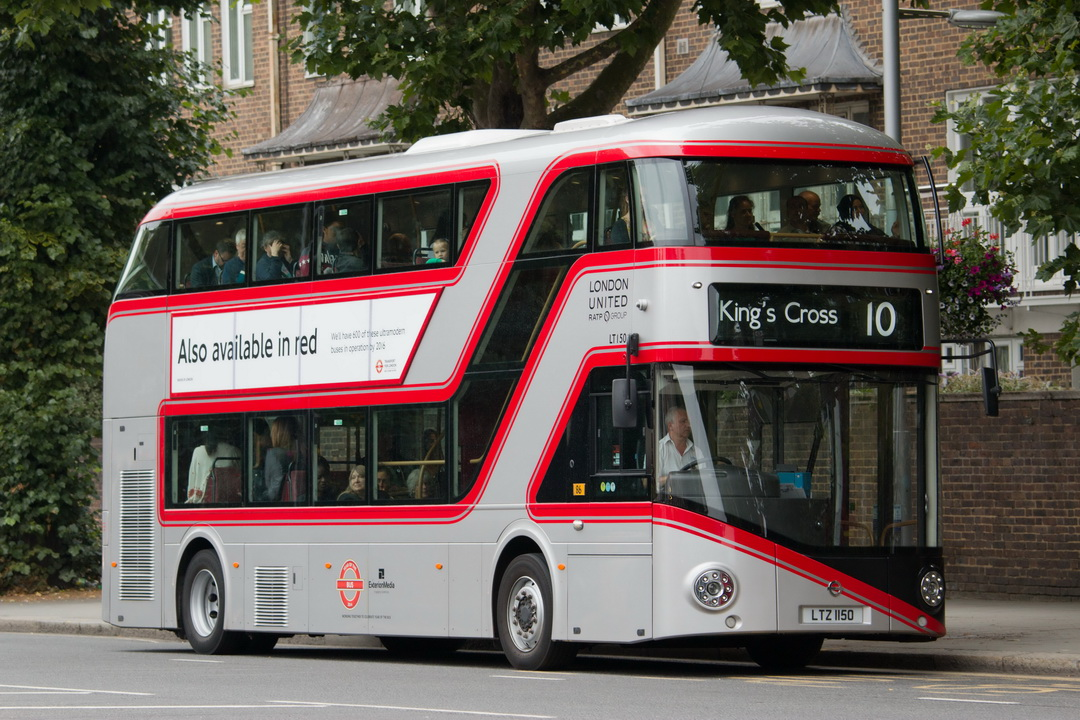
London United New Routemaster painted in red and silver livery to promote the "Year of the Bus" on former route 10 in July 2014

A static mockup was unveiled at Acton depot on 11 November 2010: the first engineering prototype was driven by Boris Johnson at a public demonstration on 27 May 2011. The first working prototype was unveiled in December 2011 and driven from City Hall to Trafalgar Square. Within days of its unveiling, the first prototype was reported to have broken down on the M1 motorway north of London, but this was due to human error; it had run out of fuel. The first new bus (fleet number LT 2) entered service with Arriva London on 27 February 2012, on route 38. During the 2012 London mayoral election, former mayor of London and Labour candidate Ken Livingstone said that, if elected, he would buy no more New Buses for London because of the price. However, Boris Johnson won the election and in September 2012 approved the order for 600 of the new buses, with public funding required estimated at £160 million. The prototypes remain in service on route 38. The eight prototypes were registered on GB registration plates. A block series of Northern Ireland plates in the LTZ 1xxx series was reserved for the production examples with the xxx correlating with the fleet number. The prototypes were reregistered.

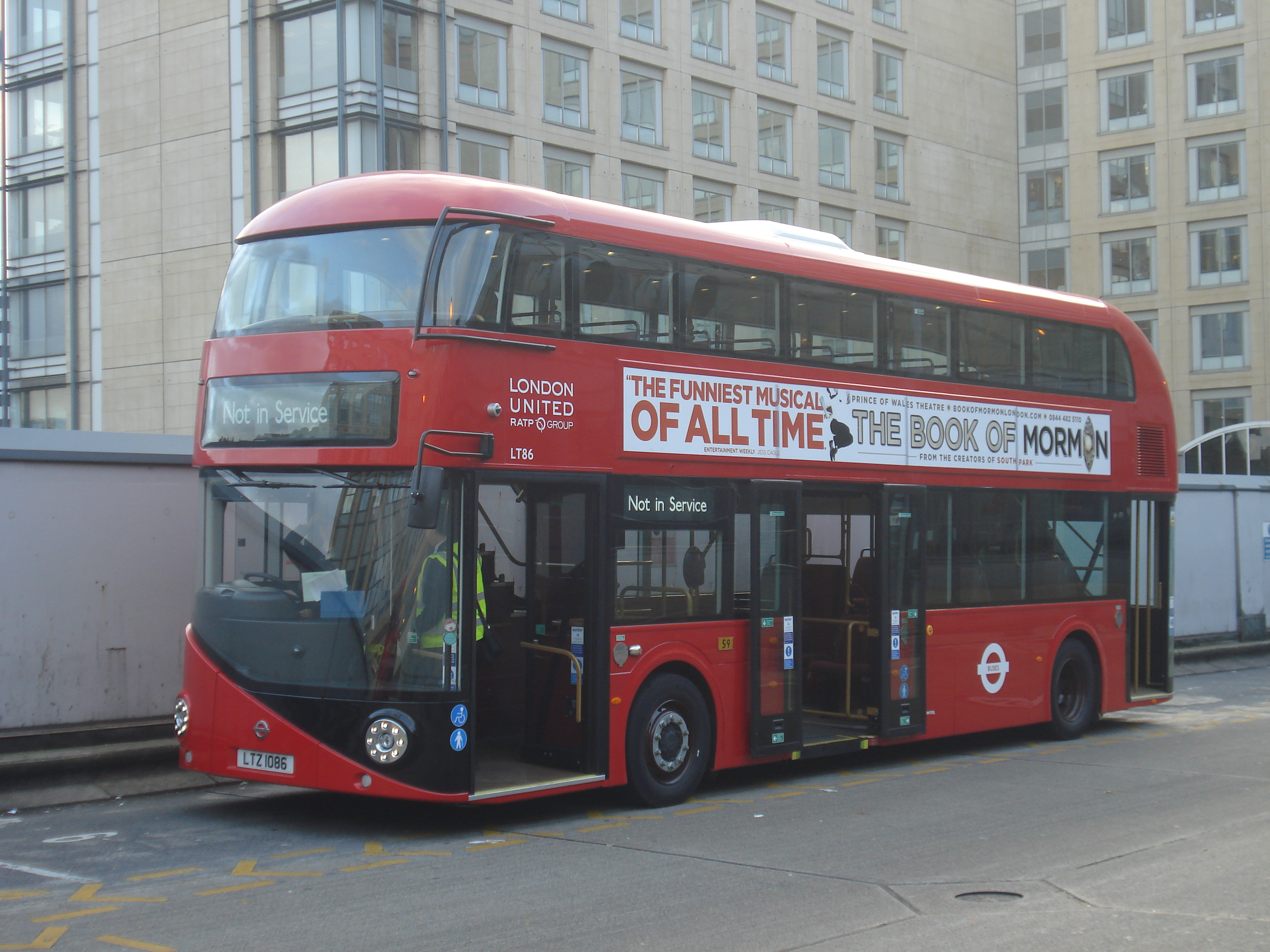
A New Routemaster at Hammersmith bus station in October 2013

The first 272 were delivered with Euro 5 engines except for six, which were fitted with trial Euro 6 engines. The remaining deliveries received Euro 6 engines. In 2014, a further 200 were ordered taking the total to 808. This was later cut back to 805. In January 2016, an additional order was placed, bringing the total to 1,000.

In June 2015, The Guardian reported that the rear door design had been changed, so the door could not be opened between stops, and the platform pole removed, abandoning the original "hop-on, hop-off" open platform design objective. One (ST812) was built to a shorter wheelbase, with eight fewer seats and a length of 10.1 metres instead of the normal 11.3 metres, entering service in 2016 with Metroline on route 91.

At the end of 2016, it was announced that London Mayor Sadiq Khan had discontinued procurement of the vehicles to save money and help pay for a promised four-year public transport fares freeze. No new Routemaster buses will be purchased for London, the funds instead going towards upgrading the city's existing fleet with the latest sustainable technologies.

== Demonstrations ==
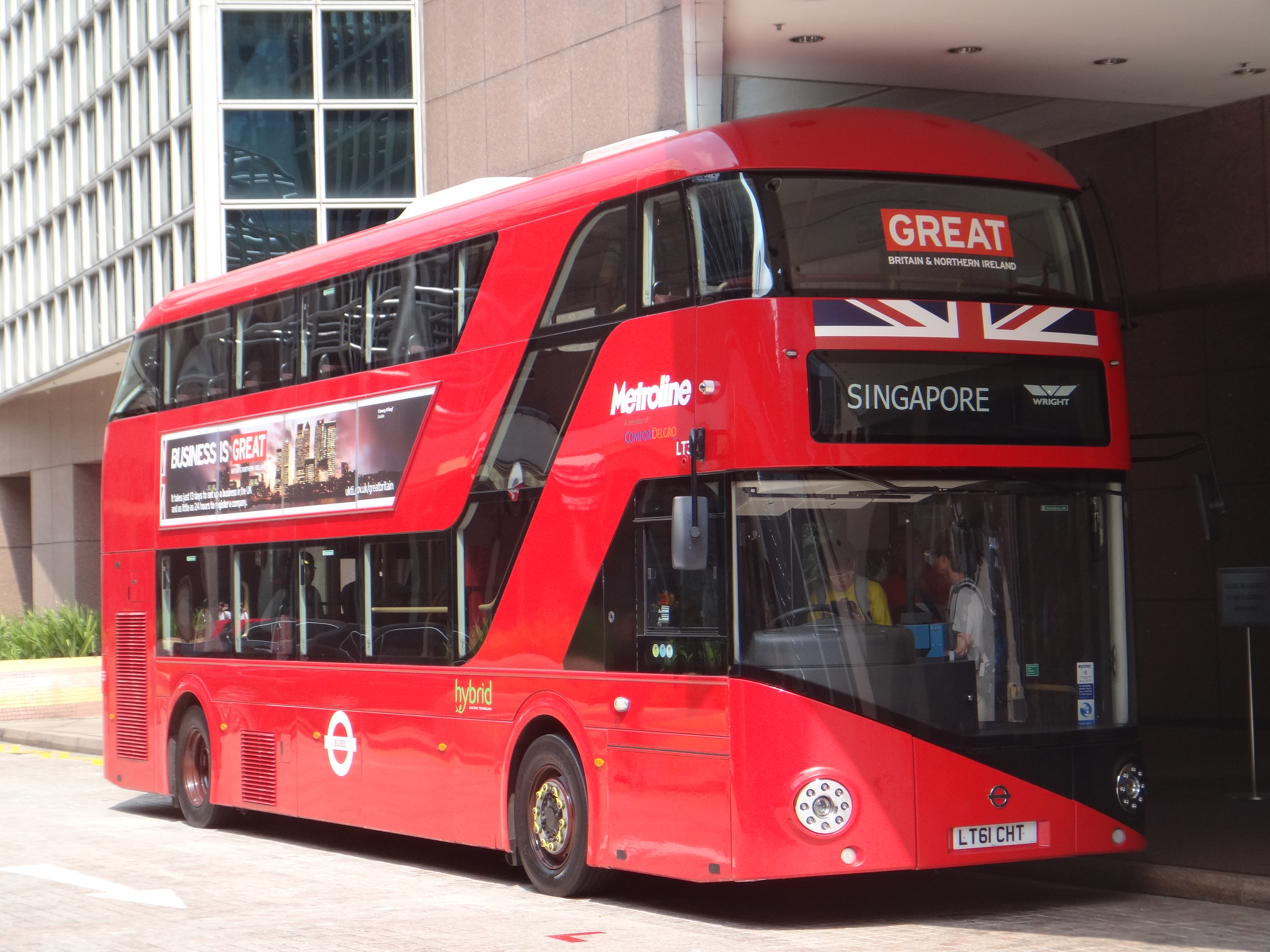
LT3 in Singapore in February 2014

In May 2013, LT1 and LT2 were loaned to the UK government to take part in a global trade mission covering 16 countries in four continents over 12 months. In October 2013, LT3 was sent on a demonstration tour to Hong Kong and then to Singapore in February 2014. As at August 2014, LT1 was stored in Abu Dhabi pending a decision on the future of the programme while the other two had returned to England.

In August 2014, LT2 commenced a six-month trial with First West Yorkshire. It was repainted green, branded as the New Bus for West Yorkshire. The bus was displayed at numerous industry and bus enthusiasts' events, but it ultimately never saw public service in West Yorkshire and was returned in London in 2015; the green livery was later modified to form the basis of a London Country Bus Services retro livery, one of several heritage schemes carried by New Routemasters since their introduction.

In November 2014, Stagecoach Strathtay commenced a three-month trial of a pair of New Routemasters in Dundee. Buses LT312 and LT313 were used daily on the conductor-operated route 'Tayway 73' from Arbroath to Ninewells Hospital. The Stagecoach Strathtay trial ended early in mid-December 2014, after the two vehicles proved incapable of running to the timetable and suffered a series of high-profile breakdowns in service.

== Operation ==
As of March 2025, 998 New Routemasters are in TfL operation, representing more than one-ninth of the total fleet. Two New Routemasters were retired early due to accidents.

=== Current routes ===
New Routemasters currently run on the following routes:

Route	Operator	Peak vehicle requirement	Introduction date
3	Transport UK London Bus	22	8 February 2016
5	Blue Triangle	30	28 June 2022
8	Stagecoach London	30	28 June 2014
9	Metroline	22	26 October 2013
11	London General	25	21 September 2013
12	London Central	36	28 March 2015
15	Blue Triangle	24	28 February 2015
16	Metroline	15	26 September 2015
19	Arriva London	28	5 October 2019
21	London Central	27	5 December 2016
24	Transport UK London Bus	27	22 June 2013
27	Transport UK London Bus	22	24 November 2018
32	Metroline	18	29 April 2023
38	Arriva London	59	10 May 2014
55	Stagecoach London	35	28 February 2015
59	Arriva London	26	22 March 2016
67	London General	12	15 June 2019
68	Transport UK London Bus	24	6 February 2016
73	Arriva London	53	14 May 2015
76	Arriva London	25	25 March 2017
87	London General	22	30 March 2019
137	Arriva London	31	2 December 2014
148	London United	25	15 February 2014
149	Arriva London	38	13 October 2015
159	Transport UK London Bus	34	12 December 2015
176	London Central	22	7 November 2021
189	Metroline	20	30 August 2016
211	London United	20	4 June 2016
215	Stagecoach London	5	1 February 2024
248	Arriva London	15	24 September 2022
253	Arriva London	32	20 October 2016
254	Arriva London	33	3 June 2017
267	Transport UK London Bus	17	7 November 2017
313	Arriva London	8	4 October 2020
390	Metroline	22	7 December 2013
415	Transport UK London Bus	10	30 July 2018
453	London Central	35	18 October 2014
EL1	Blue Triangle	17	18 February 2017
EL2	Blue Triangle	15	18 February 2017
EL3	Blue Triangle	14	
H32	London United	8	28 August 2021
N3	Transport UK London Bus	13	8 February 2016
N8	Stagecoach London	21	28 June 2014
N9	Metroline	18	26 January 2019
N11	London General	7	31 October 2015
N15	Blue Triangle	23	26 August 2017
N19	Arriva London	8	5 October 2019
N32	Metroline	6	29 April 2023
N38	Arriva London	26	10 May 2014
N55	Stagecoach London	12	28 February 2015
N73	Arriva London	13	14 May 2015
N87	London General	13	30 March 2019
N253	Arriva London	13	20 October 2016

=== Former routes ===
New Routemasters previously operated on the following routes.

Route	Last operator	Peak vehicle requirement	NRMs introduced	NRMs withdrawn
10	London United	23	26 April 2014	23 November 2018
48	Arriva London	22	25 February 2017	12 October 2019
88	London General	23	24 August 2015	29 March 2019
91	Metroline	21	9 May 2016	November 2021
111	Transport UK London Bus	24	28 August 2021	2023
168	Metroline	22	2017	30 September 2023
N16	Metroline	6		April 2023
SL3	Stagecoach London	15	24 February 2024	August 2025

In November 2018, route 10 was withdrawn and its New Routemaster buses were transferred to route 27. In March 2019, route 88 was restructured and its New Routemaster buses were transferred to route 87. On 11 October 2019, route 48 was withdrawn. Route 91's New Routemaster buses were transferred to Routes 17 and 332.

=== Daily operation ===
When in one-person operation, the driver operates all three doors. When in two-person operation, a conductor stood on the rear platform and that door stayed open even while the bus was moving. At stops, the conductor pressed a button to inform the driver that the platform was clear; the driver operated the other two doors as was done for one-person operation.

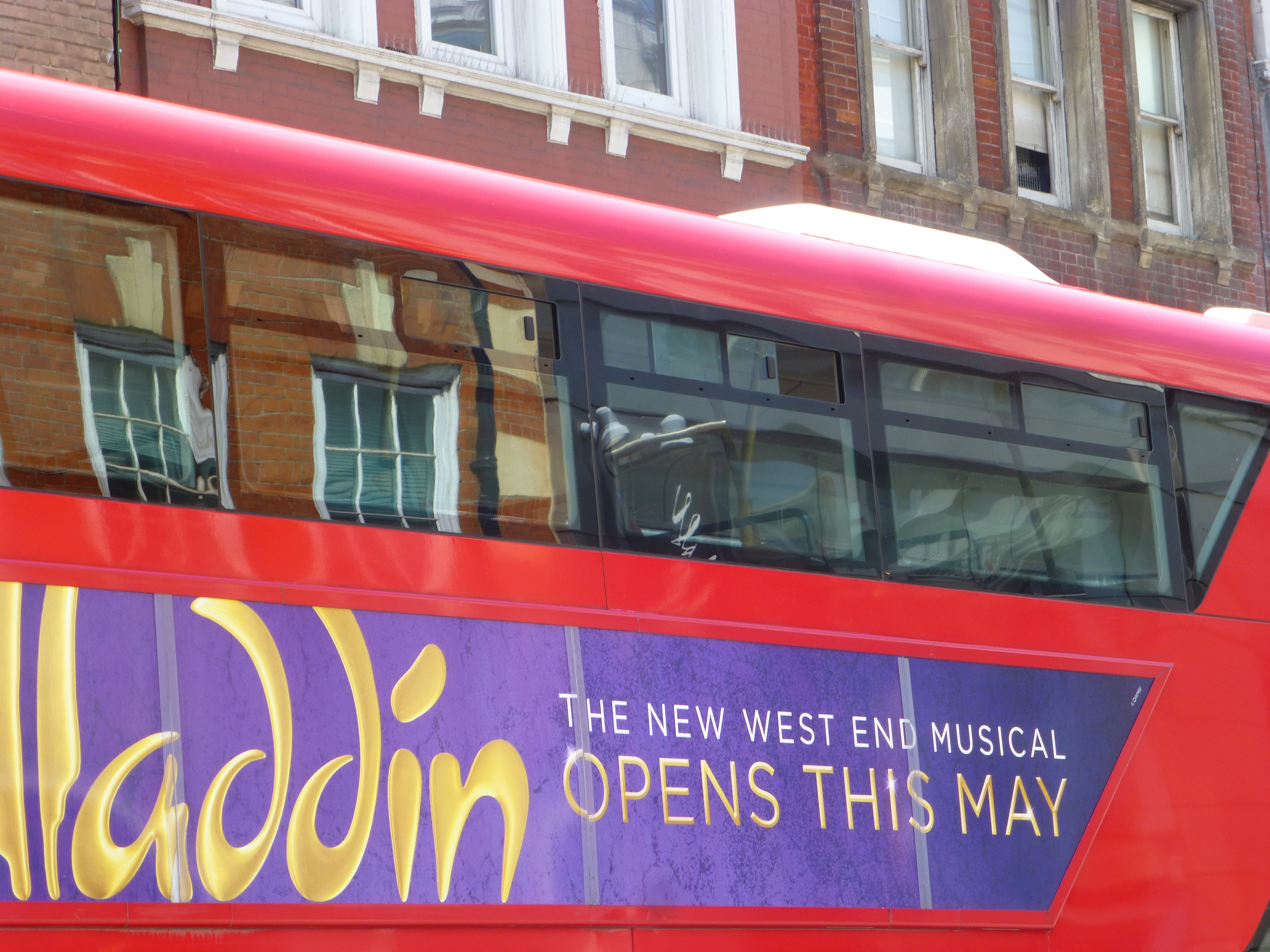
A New Routemaster with retrofitted top-deck windows in June 2016

Only routes 9, 10, 11, 24, 38 and 390 initially operated with an open rear platform and a conductor on board. The other routes did not operate with conductors from the start, and the rear platform remained closed while the bus was moving. In 2014, the TfL board was told that new routes would have no conductors and would operate with the rear door closed while moving.

The annual cost of employing conductors from 06:00 to 19:00 on weekdays was about £62,000 per bus per year. In July 2016, it was announced by TFL that the conductor would be phased out on all six previously crewed routes in September 2016.

In August 2019, the middle and rear doors on New Routemasters on routes 8/N8 became exit-only with passengers now only able to board through the front door like on conventional double-decker buses. In 2020, it was announced that conversion so passengers only enter by the front door would be made permanent on the entire fleet, to reduce fare evasion which had been double that on other buses.

To address issues caused by air-conditioning failures, in September 2015, it was announced a programme would commence to retrofit opening windows.

== Mid-life developments ==
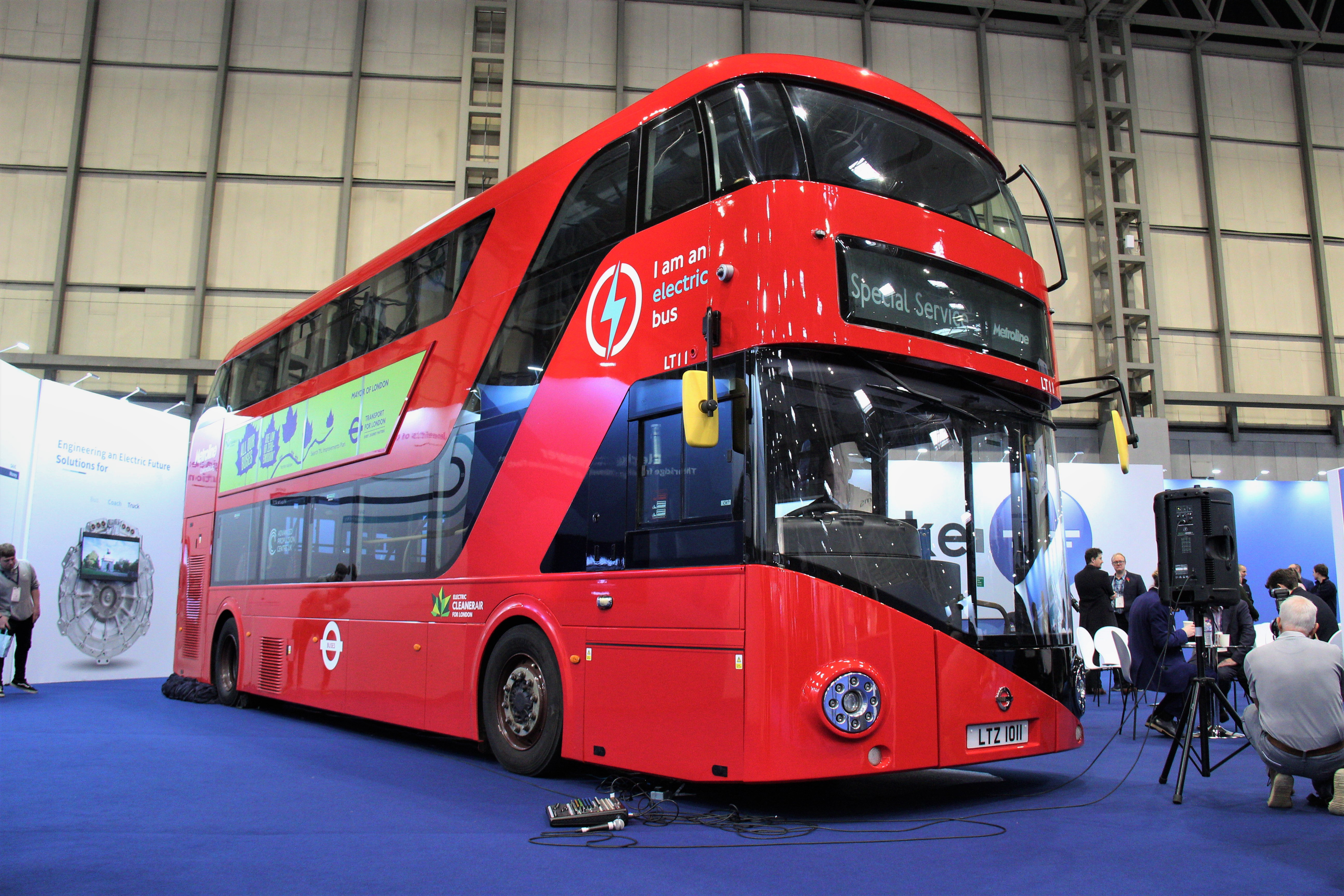
The Equipmake electrified New Routemaster prototype on display at the 2022 Euro Bus Expo

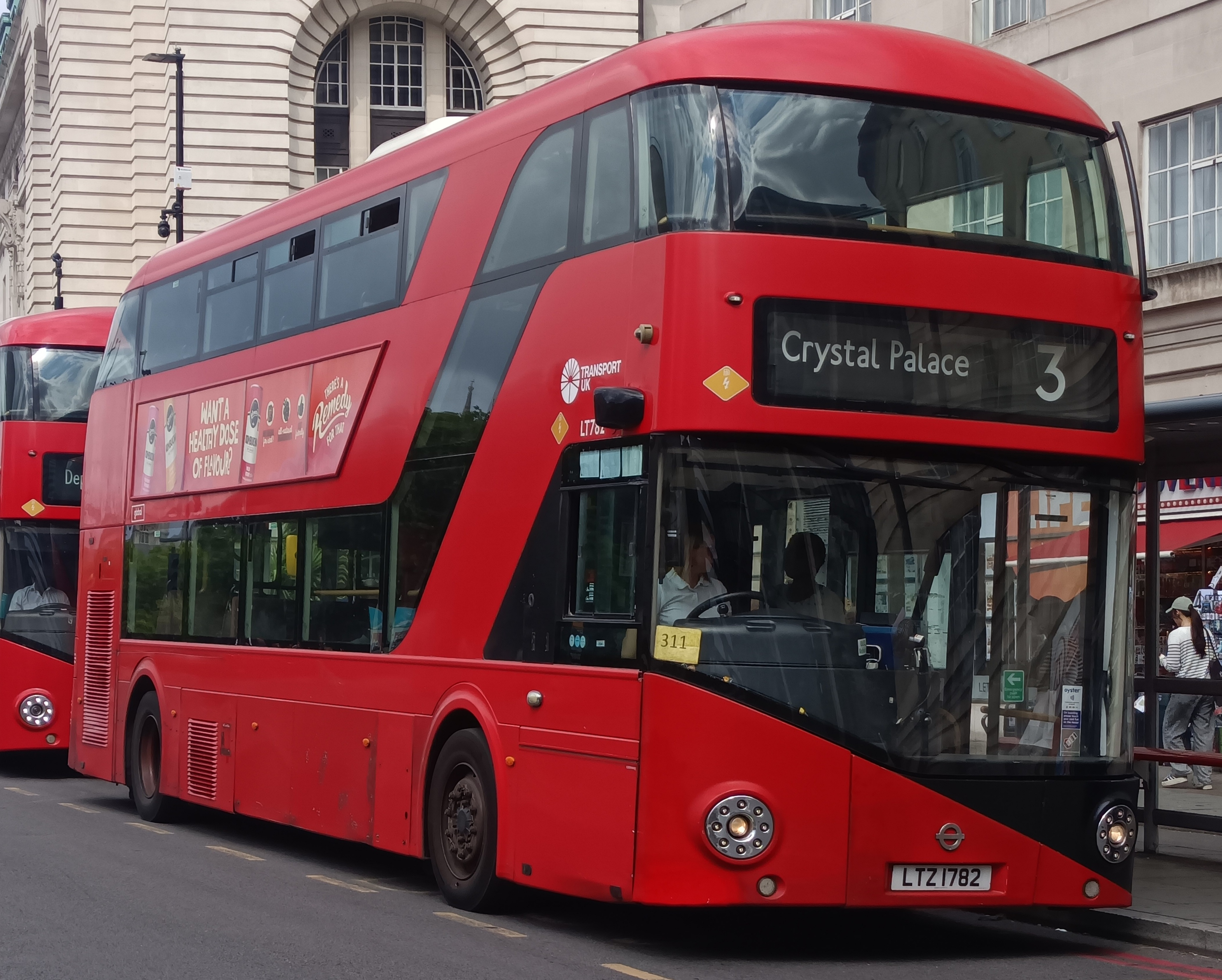
A New Routemaster retrofitted with new rear view cameras

Entering the early 2020s, as the oldest New Routemasters began to approach ten years old and London bus operators began to commit more heavily to purchasing only electric buses, there were considerations regarding what should be done with the New Routemaster fleet. A number of older New Routemasters underwent an internal refresh during this time, being fitted with new seats and refreshed seat moquette. Besides, the traditional side mirrors of some New Routemasters were replaced by digital side-view cameras.

At the Euro Bus Expo in November 2022, Norfolk-based electric vehicle manufacturer Equipmake unveiled the first electric vehicle conversion for the New Routemaster, with Metroline-operated vehicle LT11 on display at the event with its hybrid propulsion system having been removed and replaced by Equipmake fully-electric motors and a 400 kWh battery. The Equipmake New Routemaster electrification programme may allow the New Routemaster fleet to have a longer service life in London, as conversion of these vehicles to fully-electric will provide a cheaper alternative to purchasing replacement brand new electric buses.

== Ownership ==
Under the bus contract tendering system for London, routes are often updated with new buses every five to seven years, with new buses owned or leased by the operator, whether the route operator changes or not. Older buses often go on to further use outside London, either cascaded within the fleets of the large national operators who own several of the London operating companies or sold to other regional companies. An exception is the New Routemaster. New Routemaster is only exclusive for London usage, so when the bus operator changes (such as the cases of routes 15, 24, 27, 68, 76, 211 and 267) the New Routemaster will continue to remain on the same route but different operator, but it will stay throughout the physical lifespan of New Routemaster.

However, from 2023 onwards; both hybrid buses and diesel buses (including New Routemaster) contracts will last up to maximum 5 years. Electric buses will last up to maximum 10 years.

London transport commissioner Peter Hendy acknowledged in 2008 that there were economic challenges in requiring current private London bus operators to tender for routes if they required the outright purchase of the New Routemaster. He acknowledged it could lead to higher bids overall because a rear platform bus was unlikely to appeal to operators outside London and with the questionable applicability of hybrid technology to more rural operations.

== Culture and media ==
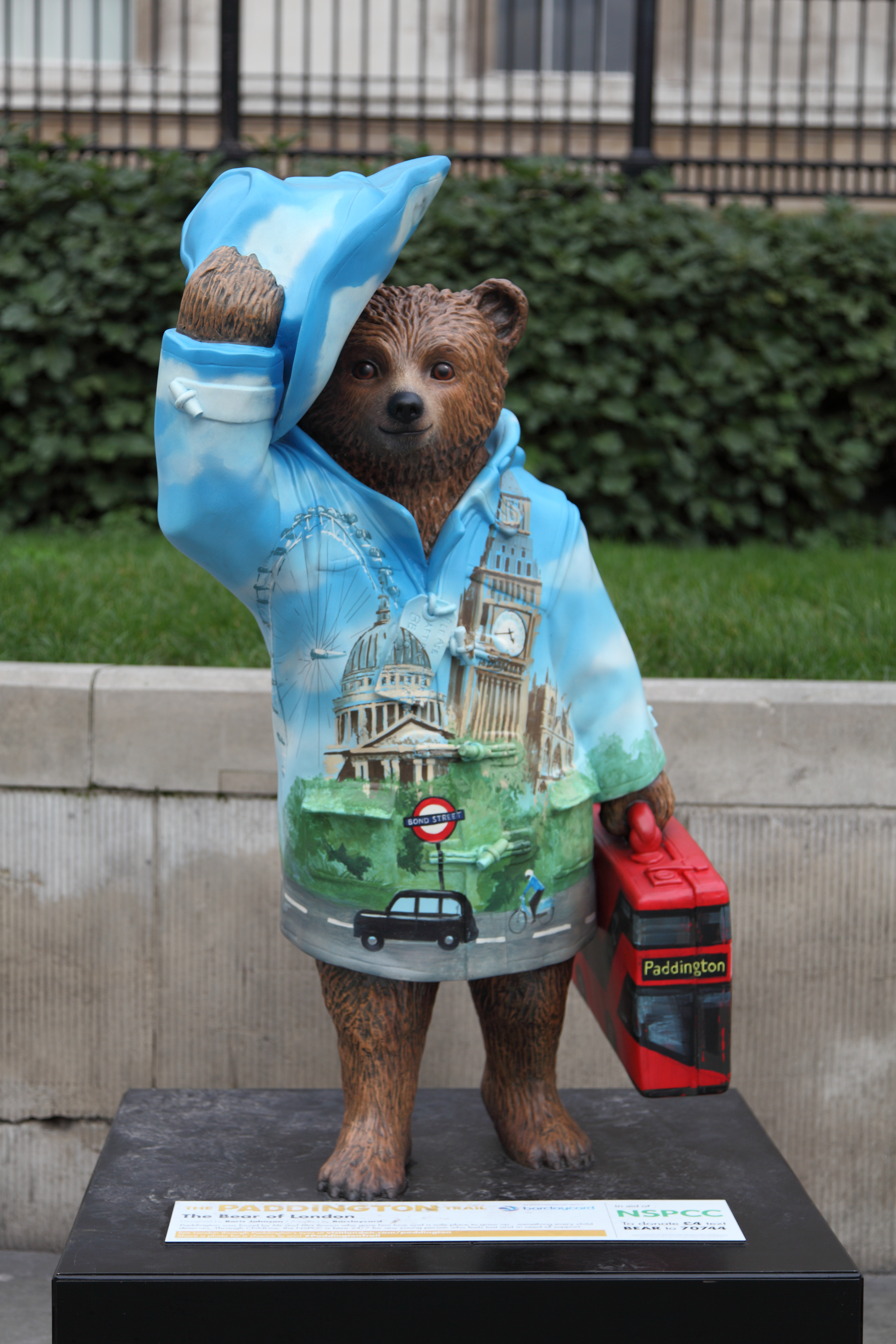
A London-themed Paddington Bear statue, featuring a New Routemaster Bus design as his suitcase

The launch of the design for the New Bus for London led to BBC One's The One Show airing a segment on 18 May 2010 reviewing the 100-year history of the London standard double-decker, with John Sergeant reviewing the history of, and riding preserved examples of, the 1910 LGOC B-type, the RT and the original AEC Routemaster.

Because of the close connection between British car magazine Autocar and New Routemaster, it was the subject of a road test in December 2011. The magazine said it was "the best in public transport", referring to the vehicle's hybrid drivetrain as "brilliant economy and an interior to die for".

The New Routemaster was also road-tested by Top Gear's James May in an episode where it left London and drove to attractions such as Cheddar Gorge before returning to the capital to take part in a 'Best of British' vehicle celebration.

== Criticism ==
The New Routemaster has been criticised for the ineffectiveness of its air conditioning on hot days; the Mayor responded that the system was working as intended.

The upper-deck windows have been criticised for being small, not giving comparable views to other bus models, and not letting in much light to the upper deck, making it "gloomy".

Although London Buses' Director of Operations promised that all New Routemasters would be staffed by conductors and the rear platform would be open 12 hours a day, when the buses were introduced on route 148, there was no second crew member and the rear platform was opened by the driver at bus stops only.

In July 2015, the BBC reported a high level of battery failure, with 80 New Routemasters operating in diesel-only mode. 200 New Routemasters had at least some failing batteries, which would be replaced under warranty. An improved battery design was introduced. The unavailability of the battery leaves the bus slow and with poor acceleration, in addition to producing pollution.

Prior to 2017, some New Routemaster buses with faulty batteries emitted more harmful particles than the buses they replaced. London mayoral candidate and transport writer Christian Wolmar, who first revealed problems with the New Routemasters, said in July 2015: "This is further evidence that this project was misconceived from the start ... It is no surprise the emissions are higher than those on conventional buses as the New Bus for London is not operating as designed. It is supposed to be powered by an electric motor, but instead is using its inefficient diesel engine that should, in normal conditions, be running at constant speed".

In one-person operation, as is the case on all units at all times after an early period with a conductor, the hop-on/hop-off advantage of the platform is negated by the closed door. Additionally, as passengers can board by any door and touch their Oyster cards to the reader, there is significant fare evasion; the driver cannot check passenger compliance as with a single entry door. This reduces revenue, but an additional issue was identified by a bus driver in a letter to a newspaper: passenger numbers are measured by the number of fares paid, so they are much underestimated. Bus provision is curtailed or cut due to this perceived drop in passenger numbers; the writer identifies routes 10 and 48 as among those cut. It has been suggested that the back door and staircase will be sealed and the Oyster card readers removed at the back and centre, removing all the remaining "Routemaster" features of the bus. Conversion so passengers only enter by the front door was announced in 2020.

== Accidents and incidents ==
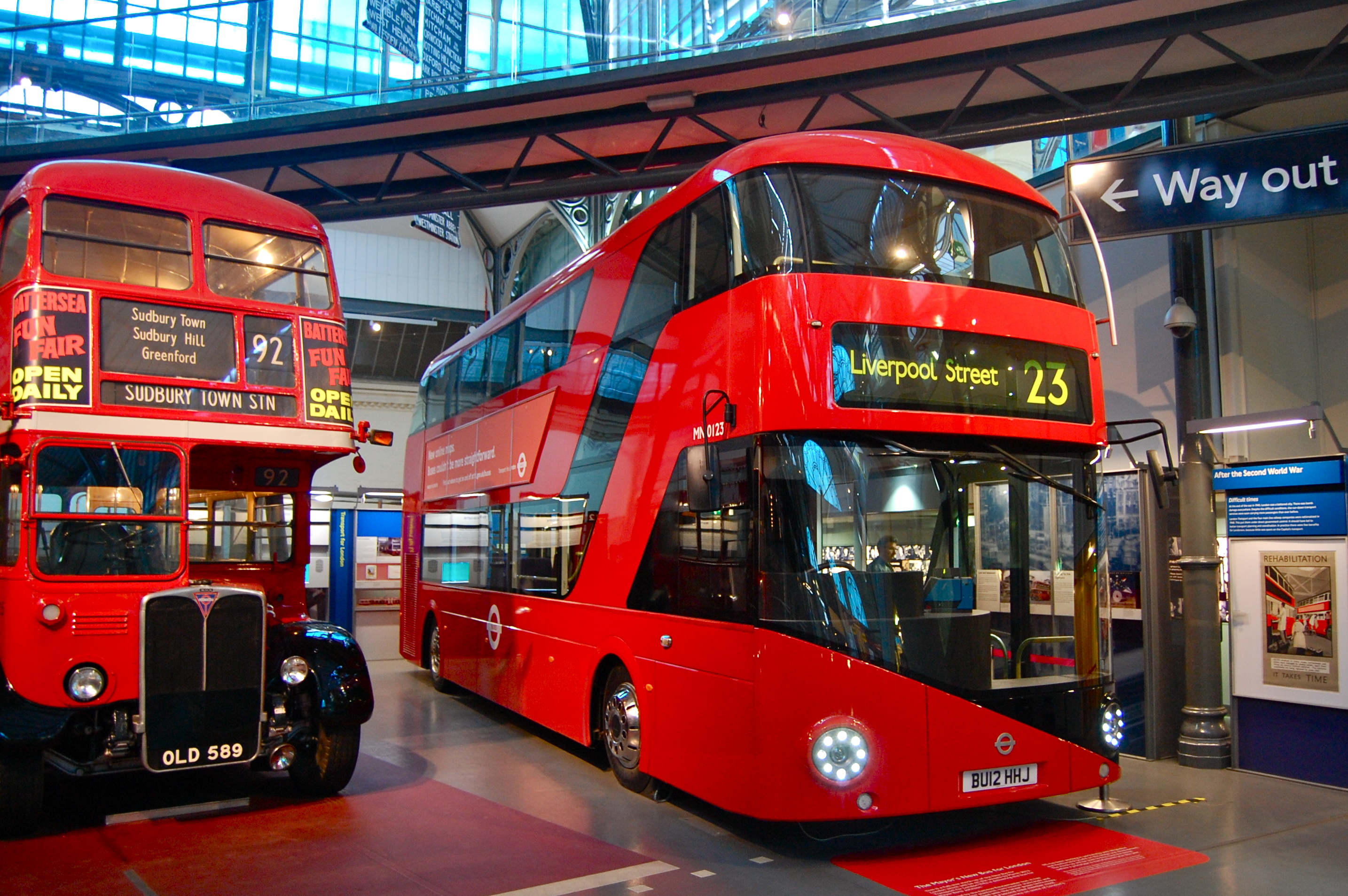
A New Routemaster on display at the London Transport Museum, displayed alongside an AEC Regent III RT

The New Routemaster has been involved in several accidents and incidents:

- In September 2013, three people were seriously injured when a New Routemaster on route 11 crashed into three other buses and some parked cars on Chelsea Bridge Road.
- In June 2014, the driver of a car going at 100 mph was killed, one person was critically injured and 12 were hurt when the car hit a New Routemaster on route N38.
- In April 2015, a car was wedged in between two New Routemasters on Goodge Street. The occupants of the car were treated at the scene.
- In July 2015, 12 people were injured with 3 being critically injured when a runaway New routemaster rear-ended An car at 40 mph.
- In January 2016, 13 people were injured when two New Routemasters on routes 11 and 148 collided with each other and hit a van in Parliament Square.
- On 27 December 2019, a New Routemaster caught fire in Kennington, while working route 59 to Euston.
- On 5 March 2024, two people were injured after the driver of a New Routemaster on route 8 lost control and crashed into a shopfront on New Oxford Street in Westminster.
- On 19 May 2024, a New Routemaster on the 5 route between Canning Town and Romford crashed into the side of a house in Claughton Road, East Ham.
- On 4 September 2025, 17 people were injured when a New Routemaster operating route 24 oversped, mounted the pavement and hit a bollard outside Victoria station.

== See also ==
- Buses in London
- List of bus types used in London
- Wright SRM – a New Routemaster-derived variant with two doors
- Yutong City Master – a Routemaster-styled bus for Skopje, North Macedonia, produced in China
