= St Johns, London =

Coordinates: 51.4694°N 0.0222°W

St Johns
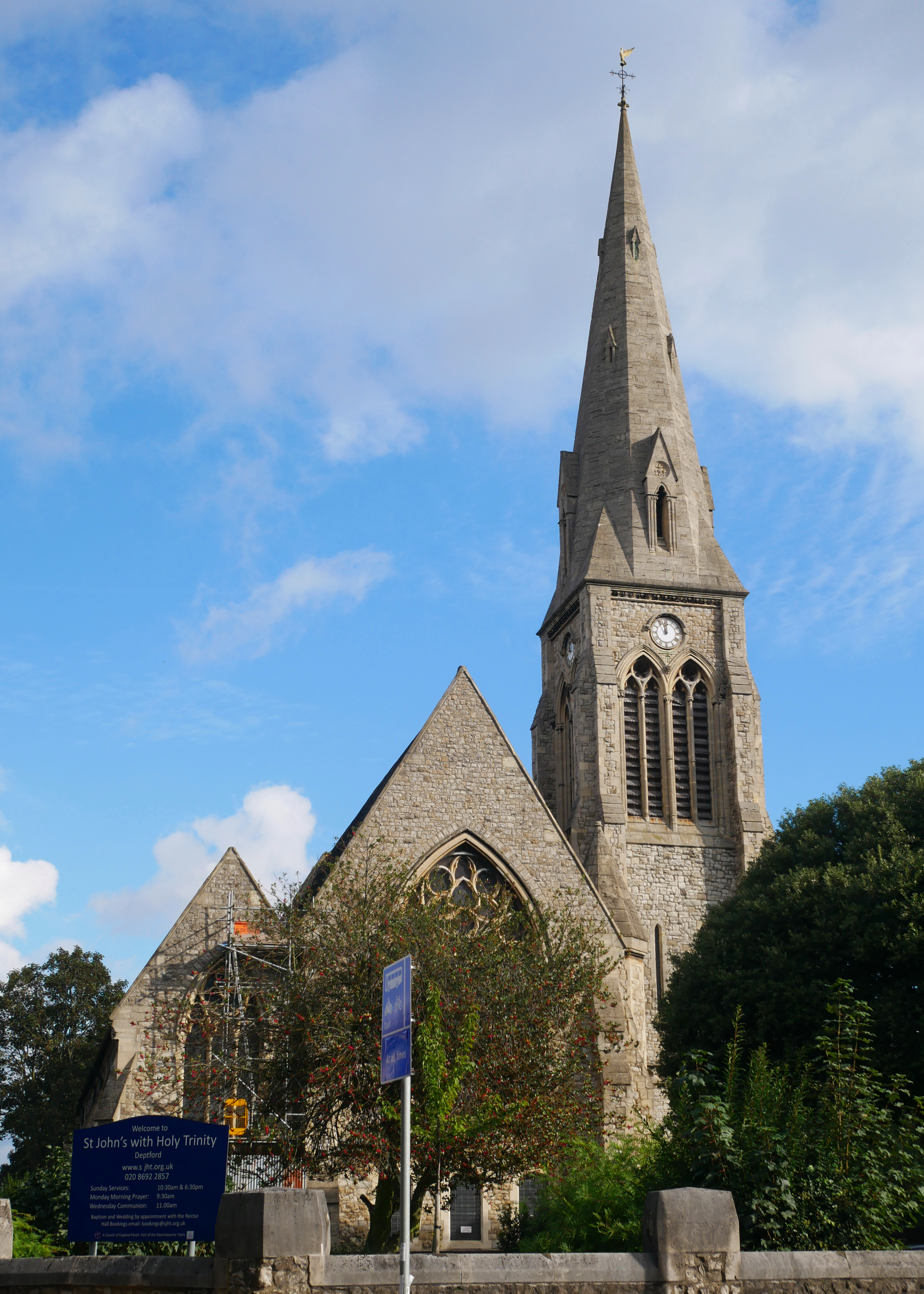
- St John's Church

- Location within Greater London
- OS grid reference: TQ373764
- London borough: Lewisham
- Ceremonial county: Greater London
- Region: London
- Country: England
- Sovereign state: United Kingdom
- Post town: LONDON
- Postcode district: SE8
- Dialling code: 020
- Police: Metropolitan
- Fire: London
- Ambulance: London
- UK Parliament: Lewisham North
- London Assembly: Greenwich and Lewisham

St Johns is a district around the station of the same name in south-east London. It lies within the Borough of Lewisham and borders the Royal Borough of Greenwich. It makes up the northwestern part of Lewisham along with Telegraph Hill.

St John's is noted for its mid 19th-century housing, constructed as Deptford New Town, and protected as the Brookmill Road and St John's Conservation Areas since 1972 and 1976 respectively. It was also the site in 1957 of one of Britain's worst railway disasters.

== Etymology ==
The district is named after the dedication of the Church of England parish church of St John, Deptford that was established in 1855. The church lies at the top of the hill, almost adjacent to the railway station which borrowed its name. The area encompasses streets between Brookmill Road and Lewisham Way, bound by Friendly Street in the west and railway embankments in the south-east. Parts of northern Brockley may be included in the designation.

== History ==
Deptford New Town was conceived by the Lucas family as an affordable and spacious alternative for the working classes of mid to late 19th century Deptford. Originally from Cumbria, the family made their wealth in South Carolina, where they built and managed water-powered rice mills.

There are a few older buildings - the most notable being the late 18th-century Italianate mansion known as the Stone House. St John's Church was built in 1855, designed by PC Hardwicke

St John's station opened in 1871, at a time when housing construction was at its height.

David Howell was the vicar of St Johns from 1971 to 1981.

== Conservation Areas ==
The Brookmill Road Conservation Area was designated in 1972, and is bordered by Friendly Street, Brookmill Road, the southern and eastern boundaries of the properties on Albyn Road, and the railway line. The St John's Conservation Area, created four years later, covers the area between this and the Lewisham Way.

Brookmill Road Conservation Area is subject to an Article 4 Direction, preserving the character of the area by prohibiting many kinds of external alterations.

== Population ==
The population of the area is mixed, largely reflecting the large rise in property prices in recent years. A few houses are council owned, some are let, but most are owner-occupied. In the five years surrounding the arrival of the Docklands Light Railway at Deptford Bridge and Elverson Road, house prices in the area quadrupled. This resulted in an unusual mix of wealthy city workers commuting to Canary Wharf and less well-off people who had lived in the area for some time. The recent establishment and expansion of Brockley Farmers' Market, nearest station to which is St. John's, is evidence of on-going gentrification.

== 1957 railway crash ==
At 6:20pm on Wednesday 4 December 1957, in dense fog, two trains collided at St Johns station, killing 90 people and injuring 176 more. It remains one of Britain's worst railway disasters.

Due to the adverse weather, trains were late and crowded. The 5.18pm electric train from Charing Cross to Hayes, with 1,500 passengers on board, was stationary beneath the railway bridge carrying the line to London Victoria, to the east of St Johns station. The 4.56pm steam express train from Cannon Street to Ramsgate, carrying 700 people, ploughed into the rear of the standing train at 30 mph. The last three carriages of the steam train came to rest before they had even passed out of the station.

The 10-coach electric train in front suffered catastrophic damage as coach 8 was run through and completely destroyed by the coach immediately behind it. The leading coach of the steam train concertinaed into the steam engine in front, throwing both off the tracks to the left and dislodging a column which supported the bridge overhead. The bridge immediately collapsed, destroying of the leading coach, and crushing the second and half of the third.

Further disaster was narrowly averted two minutes later when the driver of the 5.22pm from Holborn Viaduct to Nunhead, travelling on the elevated section, noticed that the bridge was at an angle and stopped his train. Had he not done so, the front coach or perhaps two coaches would have tumbled onto the wreckage below.

The official report into the incident, written by C. A. Langley and published in June 1958, goes into great detail, and includes diagrams of where each carriage came to rest, and images of the collapsed bridge as viewed from the Hither Green side. The report holds Driver W. J. Trew of the steam express solely responsible for the accident.

The report also remarks on the misfortune of the bridge supports being knocked out. This was a particular problem because the bridge crossed at an acute angle, necessitating a much longer unsupported span than for a perpendicular crossing. Langley writes "I know of no other case in which a bridge has collapsed in this way, but in view of the serious consequences of this accident the problem will be considered in future bridge design." Overhead photography of the current bridge shows exactly how this was achieved, in a design which has become commonplace for acute-angle crossings.

== Future ==
The area is compact, well-delineated, and protected from excessive development. However it is surrounded by very varied areas.

Greenwich lies to the north, and is rapidly spreading south to fill the under-utilised space along Greenwich High Road, as new housing developments are constructed. Greenwich is a tourist hotspot and a centre for entertainment and dining. To the east, but not immediately accessible due to the River Ravensbourne, is Blackheath, an even more sought-after area. To the south lies Lewisham, with a shopping centre dissected by major roads, and a hub for public transport in the form of light rail, heavy rail and bus services. To the north lies Deptford, with Deptford High Street described by BBC News as "London's most diverse and vibrant high street".

== Transport ==
St Johns station is in London Travel Zone 2 and serves the area with services to London Cannon Street via London Bridge and services in the other direction towards various destinations in South East London and Kent. St Johns is served by many Transport for London bus services connecting it with areas in South and Central London including Lewisham, Greenwich, New Cross, Peckham, Woolwich, Thamesmead, Catford, Eltham, Sidcup, Canada Water, London Bridge and Victoria.
