= London Buses route 453 =

London bus route

453
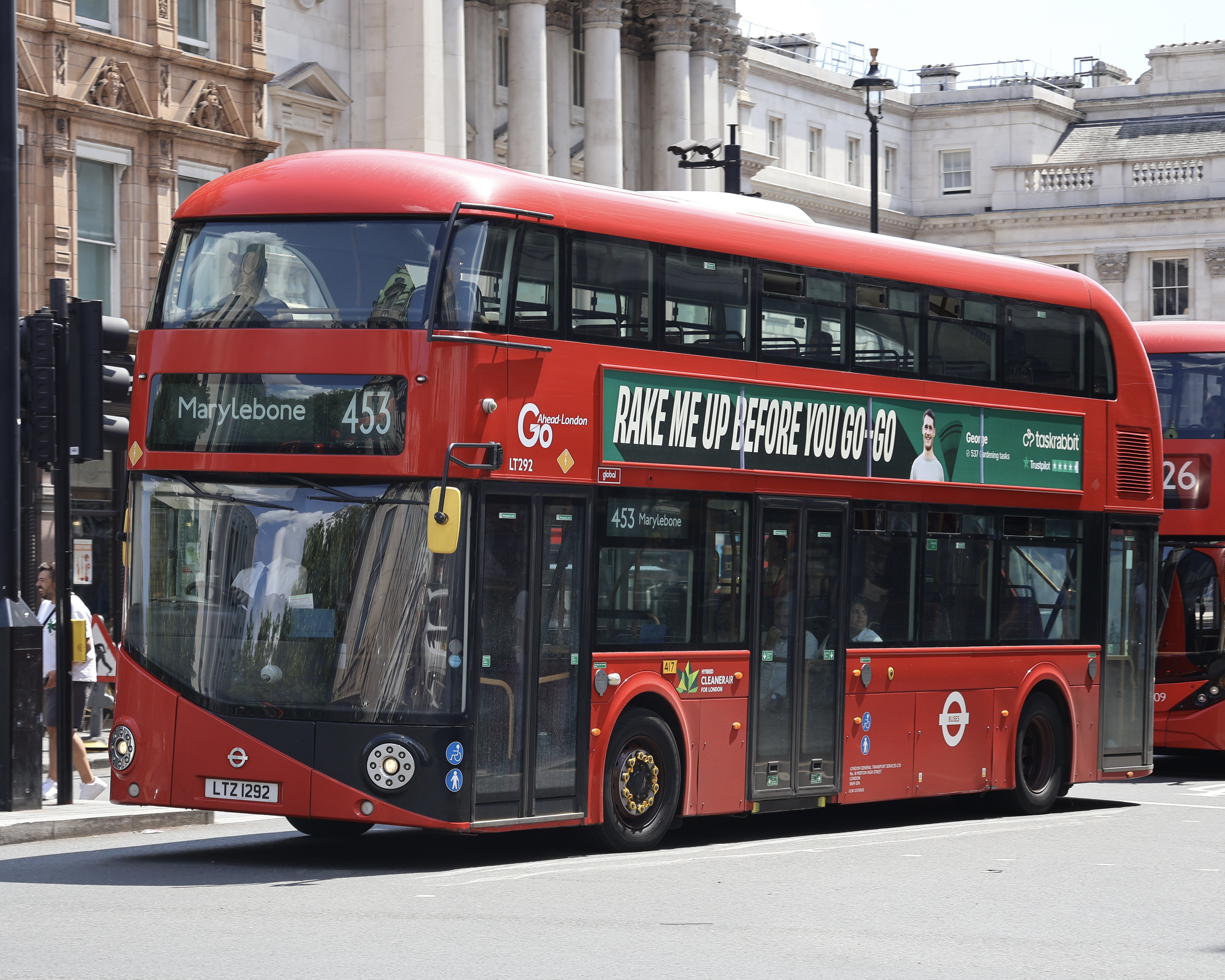
- London Central New Routemaster on Lancaster Place in June 2025

Overview
- Operator: London Central (Go-Ahead London)
- Garage: New Cross
- Vehicle: New Routemaster
- Predecessors: Route 53
- Former operator: Stagecoach London

Route
- Start: Marylebone
- Via: Oxford Circus; Westminster; Elephant & Castle; New Cross
- End: Deptford Bridge station

London Buses route 453 is a Transport for London contracted bus route in London, England. Running between Marylebone and Deptford Bridge station, it is operated by Go-Ahead London subsidiary London Central.

== History ==
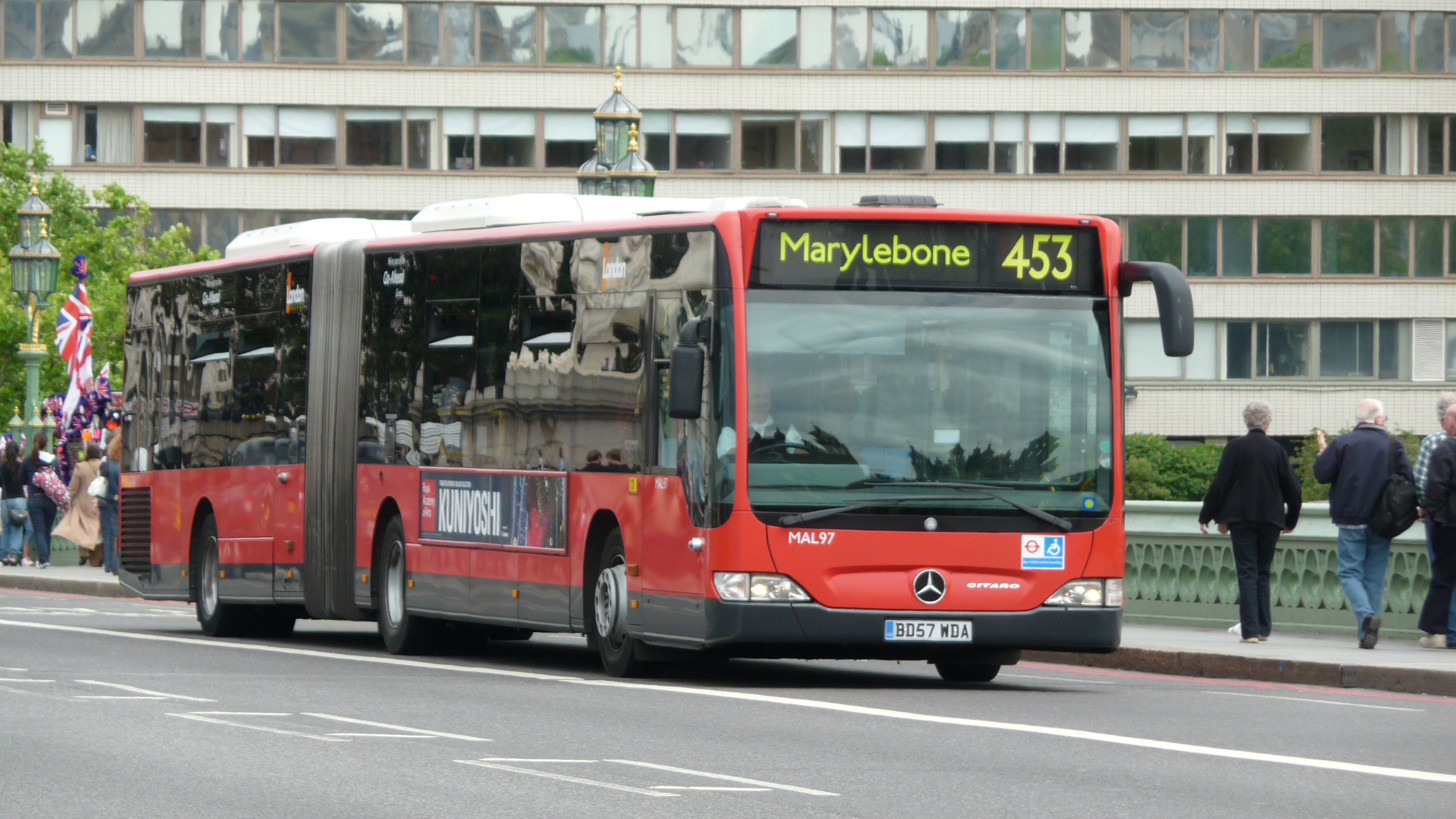
London General Mercedes-Benz O530G Citaro on Westminster Bridge in June 2009

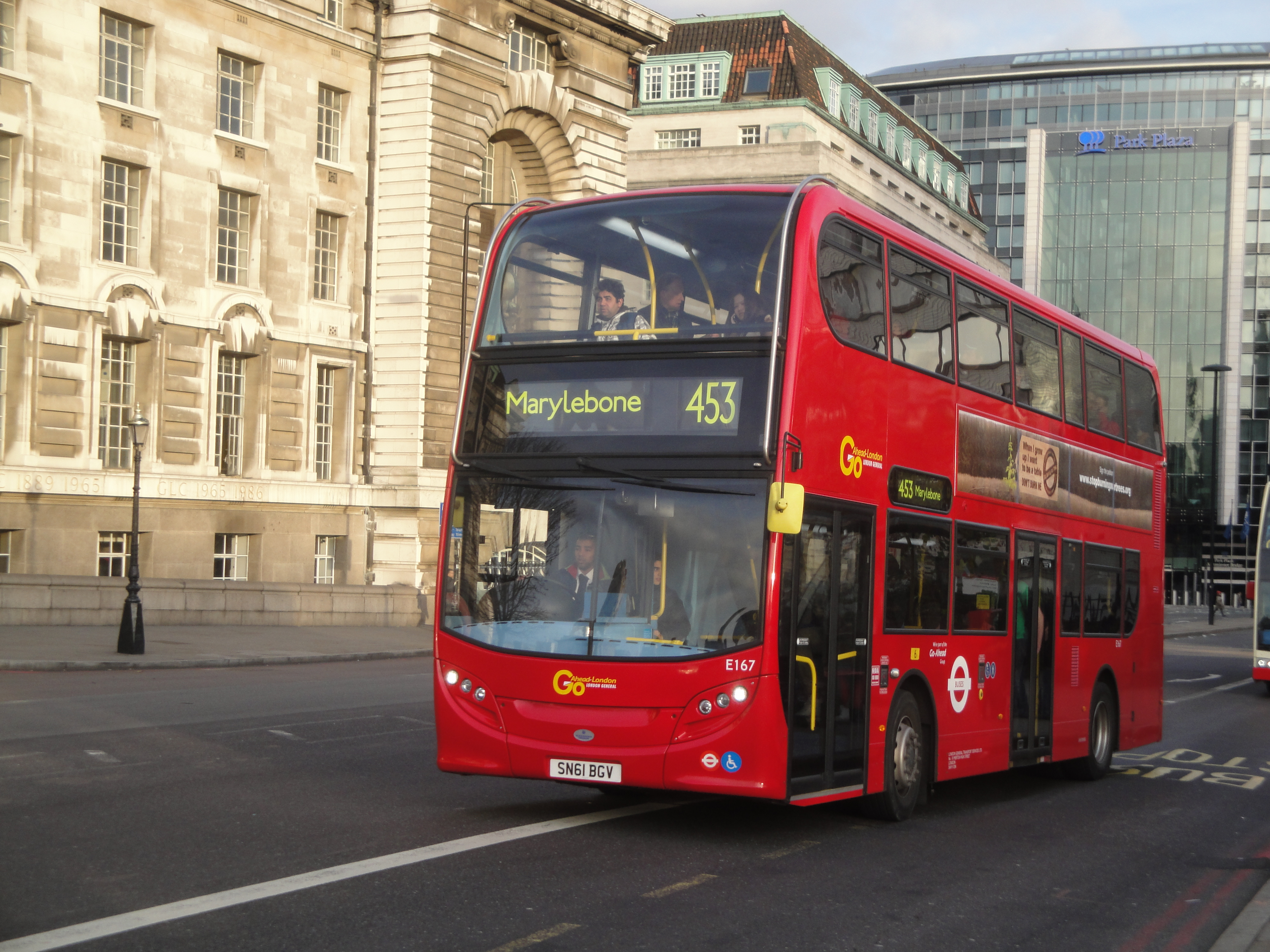
London General Alexander Dennis Enviro400 in November 2011

Route 453 commenced operating on 15 March 2003 as part of a reorganisation of routes in preparation for the introduction of the London congestion charge. Operating between Deptford Bridge and Marylebone stations, it parallels route 53 as far as Lambeth North station. It was initially operated by Stagecoach London's Plumstead garage with Mercedes-Benz O530G articulated buses. Night route N453 was introduced at the same time.

Route 453 originally started from the first busy single stop on route 53, at Deptford, outside Addey and Stanhope School, then duplicated the 53 via New Cross, New Cross Gate, Old Kent Road, Bricklayers Arms, Elephant & Castle, St George's Circus, Westminster, to Whitehall, then Regent Street, Oxford Street, Great Portland Street, Regent's Park and to Marylebone station. The section north of Oxford Circus was a new service designed to create a new south–west link at Regent's Park station.

New Routemasters were introduced on 18 October 2014. The rear platform remains closed at all times except for when the bus is at bus stops. On 29 July 2017, the route transferred to New Cross (NX) garage as Mandela Way (MW) garage closed.

== Current route ==
Route 453 operates via these primary locations:

- Marylebone
- Baker Street station
- Regent's Park station
- Great Portland Street station
- Oxford Circus station
- Piccadilly Circus
- Trafalgar Square
- Westminster station
- St Thomas' Hospital
- Lambeth North station
- Elephant & Castle station
- Bricklayers Arms
- Old Kent Road
- New Cross Gate station
- New Cross station
- Deptford Bridge station
