= London Buses route 185 =

London bus route

185
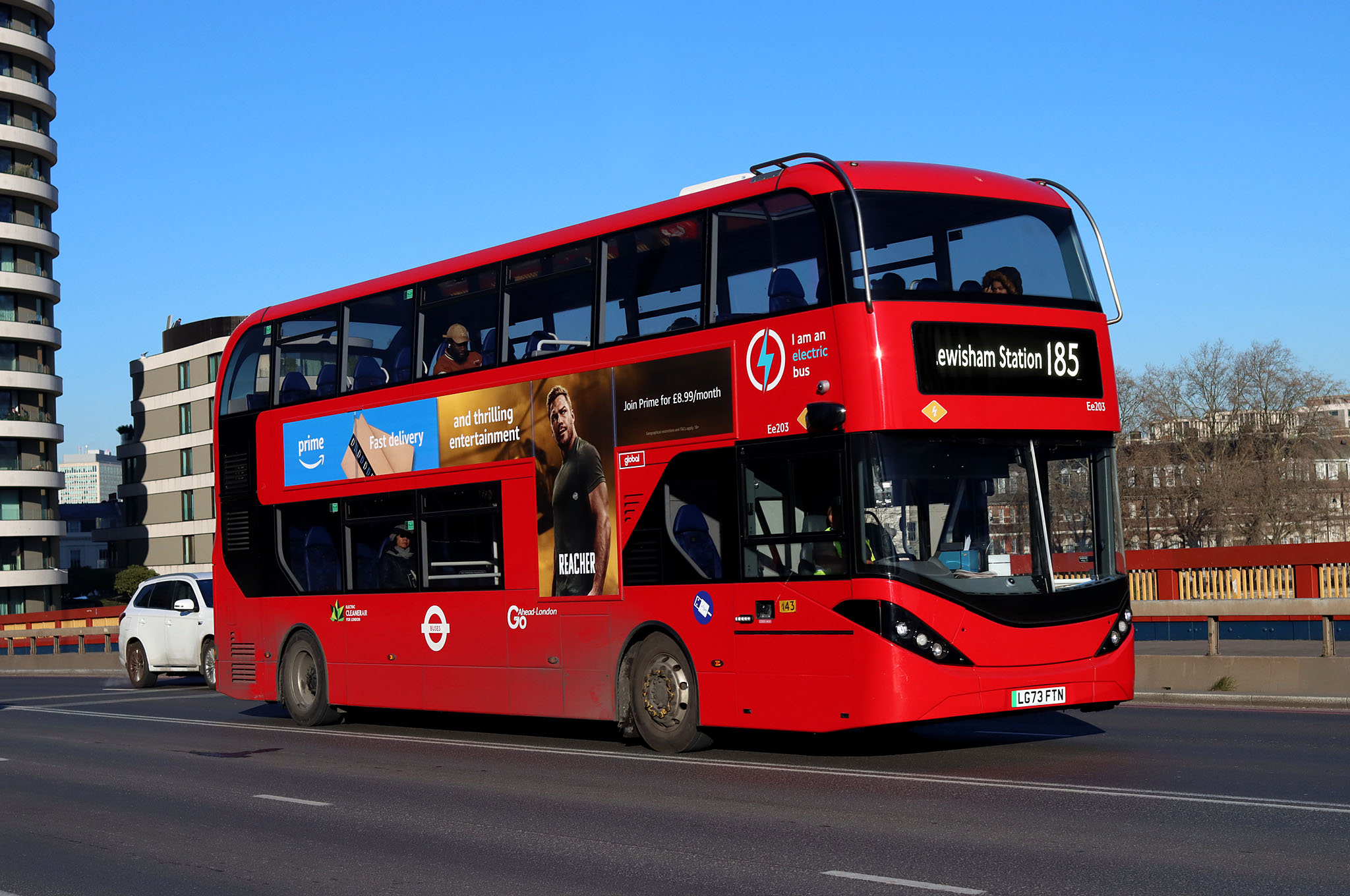
- London Central BYD Alexander Dennis Enviro400EV on Vauxhall Bridge in January 2024

Overview
- Operator: London Central (Go-Ahead London)
- Garage: Camberwell
- Vehicle: BYD Alexander Dennis Enviro400EV
- Peak vehicle requirement: 23

Route
- Start: Lewisham station
- Via: Catford; Forest Hill; Dulwich; Camberwell Green; Vauxhall
- End: Victoria station

London Buses route 185 is a Transport for London contracted bus route in London, England. Running between Lewisham and Victoria stations, it is operated by Go-Ahead London subsidiary London Central.

== History ==
AEC Regent III RT at Victoria in 1974

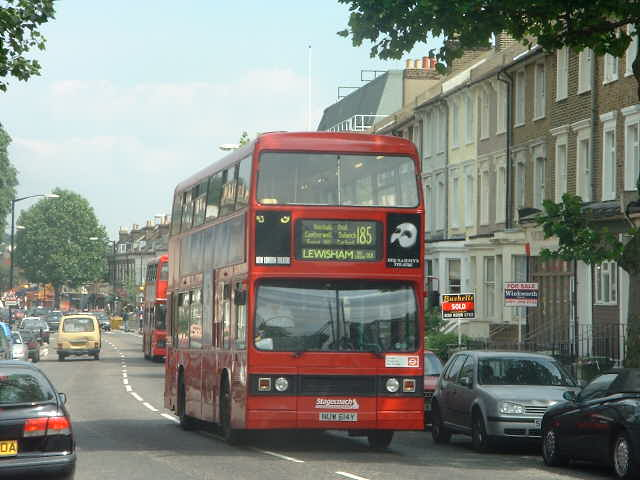
Selkent Leyland Titan in Southwark in July 2000

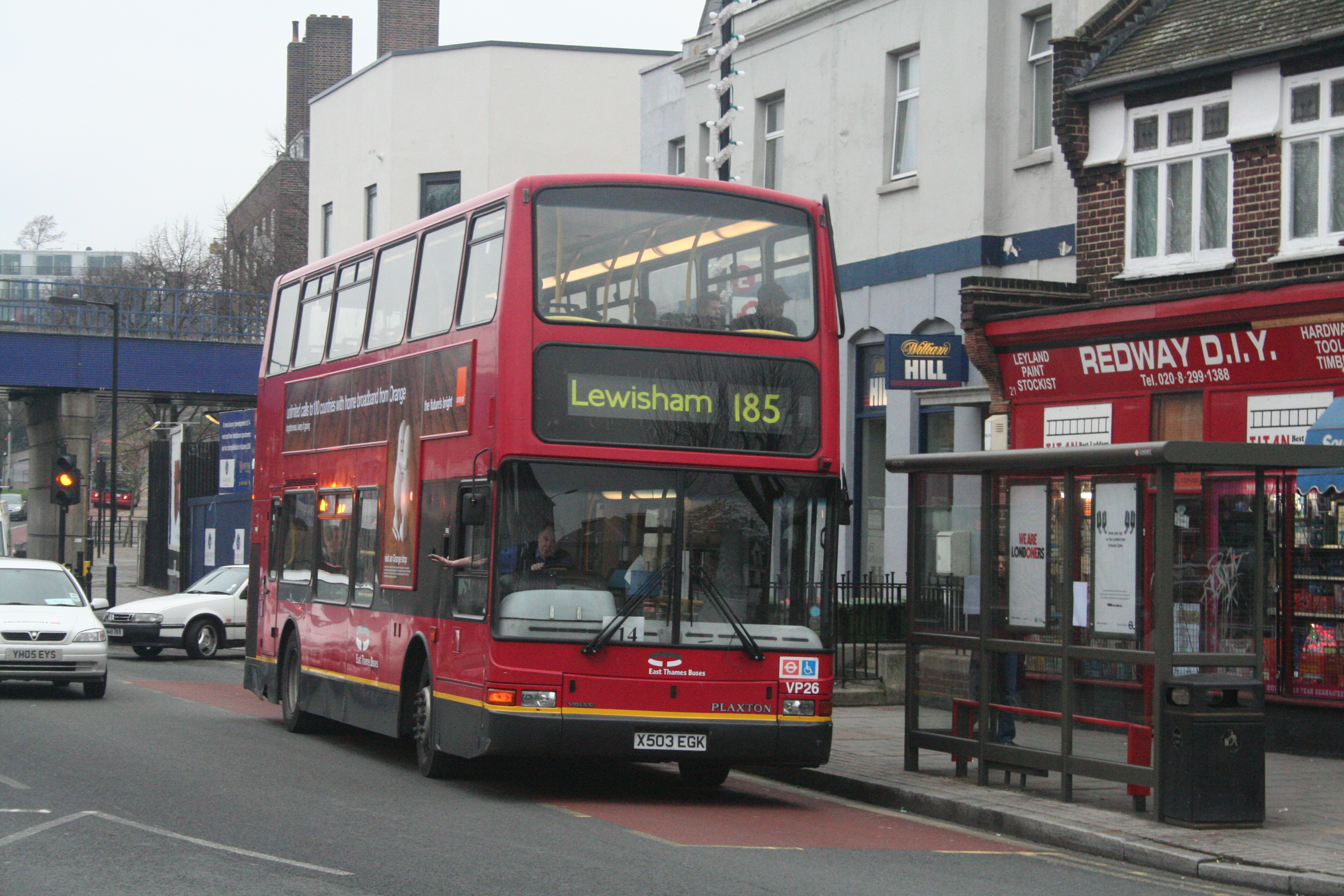
East Thames Buses Plaxton President bodied Volvo B7TL at East Dulwich station in December 2006

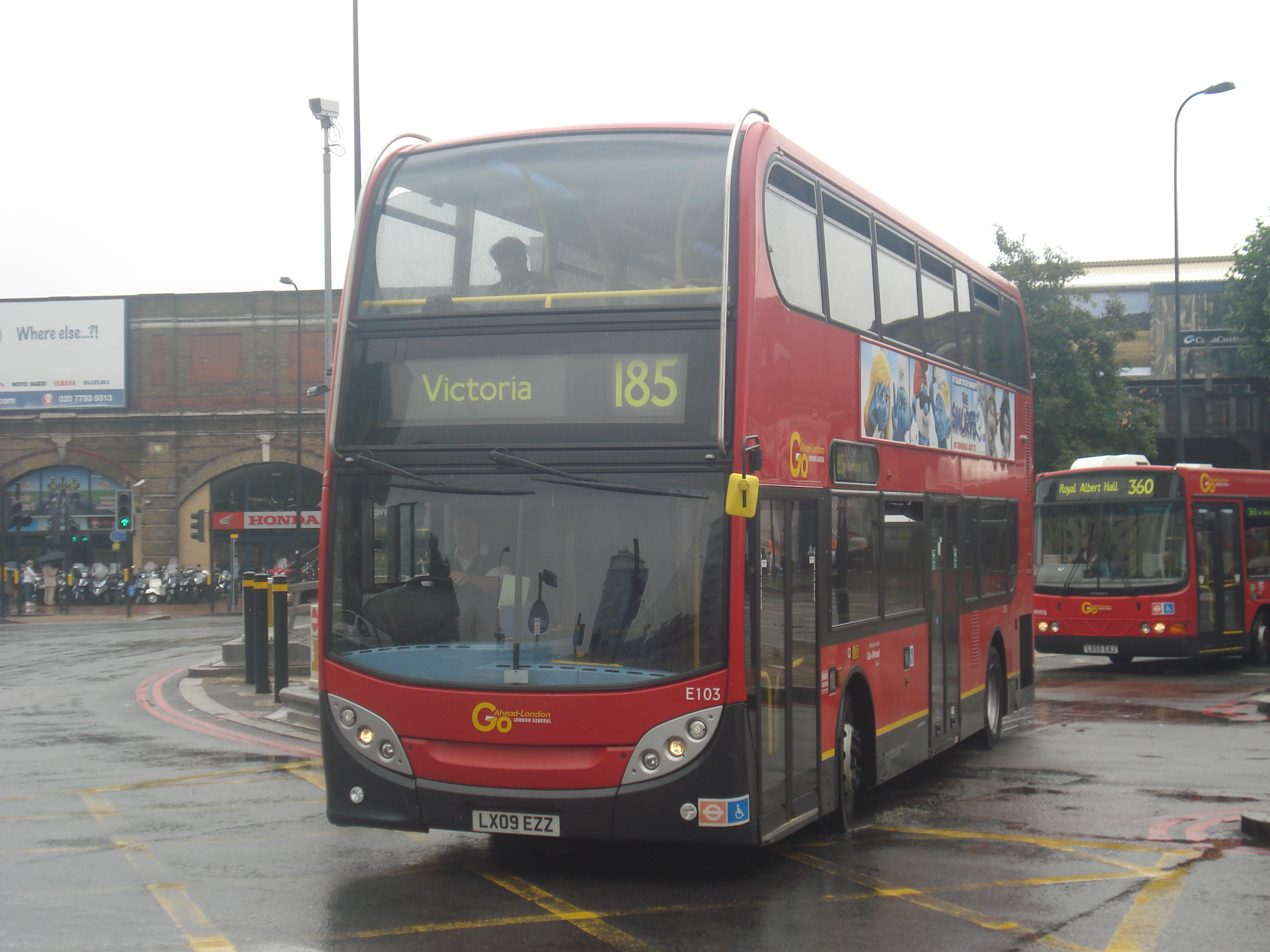
Go-Ahead London Alexander Dennis Enviro400 at Vauxhall bus station in August 2013

Upon being re-tendered in January 2001, the route passed from Selkent to London Easylink. However, because London Easylink had not received operators licences in time for their own buses, the Selkent buses were hired for the first few weeks. On 21 August 2002, when London Easylink went into liquidation, Blue Triangle was given the task of organising emergency cover at short notice.

A large number of operators were involved in providing replacement services, which operated every 15 minutes instead of every 10 as had been run prior to London Easylink's collapse. London Central and London General provided low-floor Volvo B7TL double-deckers amongst older vehicles, and fellow Go-Ahead Group subsidiary Metrobus also contributed. Independent operators Amber Lee, Carousel Buses, Imperial Buses, Redroute Buses and Sullivan Buses all provided vehicles made spare during the break in school terms; none had previously operated a Transport for London contracted route. Arriva London's tourist division The Original London Sightseeing Tour operated the route using closed-top MCW Metrobuses. After a month of service, First London and TfL subsidiary East Thames Buses joined the operation, while Stagecoach London operated additional journeys on route 53, which parallels the 185 over the southern section of route.

In December 2002 it was revealed that the 185 was the fifth least reliable service in London.

On 3 October 2009, East Thames Buses was sold to London General, which included a five-year contract to operate route 185.

== Current route ==
Route 185 operates via these primary locations:

- Lewisham station
- Lewisham Shopping Centre
- Lewisham Hospital
- Catford and Catford Bridge stations
- Forest Hill station
- Dulwich Library
- East Dulwich station
- Denmark Hill station
- King's College Hospital
- Camberwell Green
- Kennington Park
- Oval station
- Vauxhall bus station for Vauxhall station
- Vauxhall Bridge
- Pimlico station
- Victoria station
