= London Buses route 75 =

London bus route

75
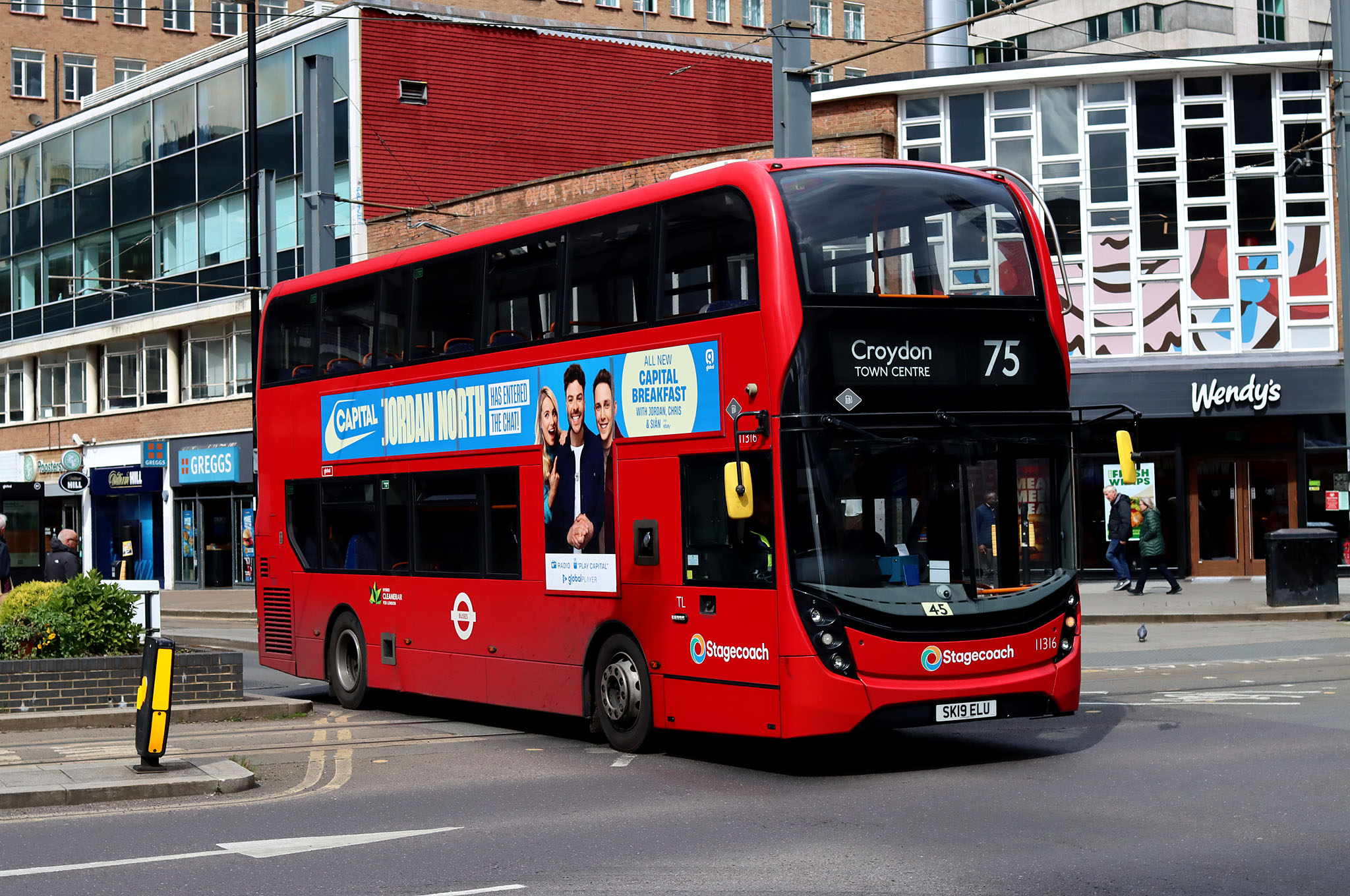
- Selkent Alexander Dennis Enviro400 MMC in Croydon in April 2024

Overview
- Operator: Selkent (Stagecoach London)
- Garage: Catford
- Vehicle: Alexander Dennis Enviro400 MMC
- Peak vehicle requirement: 15
- Night-time: No night service

Route
- Start: Fairfield Halls
- Via: South Norwood; Penge; Sydenham; Catford
- End: Lewisham station
- Length: 9 miles (14 km)

Service
- Level: Daily
- Frequency: About every 13-15 minutes
- Journey time: 35-65 minutes
- Operates: 04:00 until 02:06

London Buses route 75 is a Transport for London contracted bus route in London, England. Running between Fairfield Halls and Lewisham station, it is operated by Stagecoach London subsidiary Selkent.

== History ==
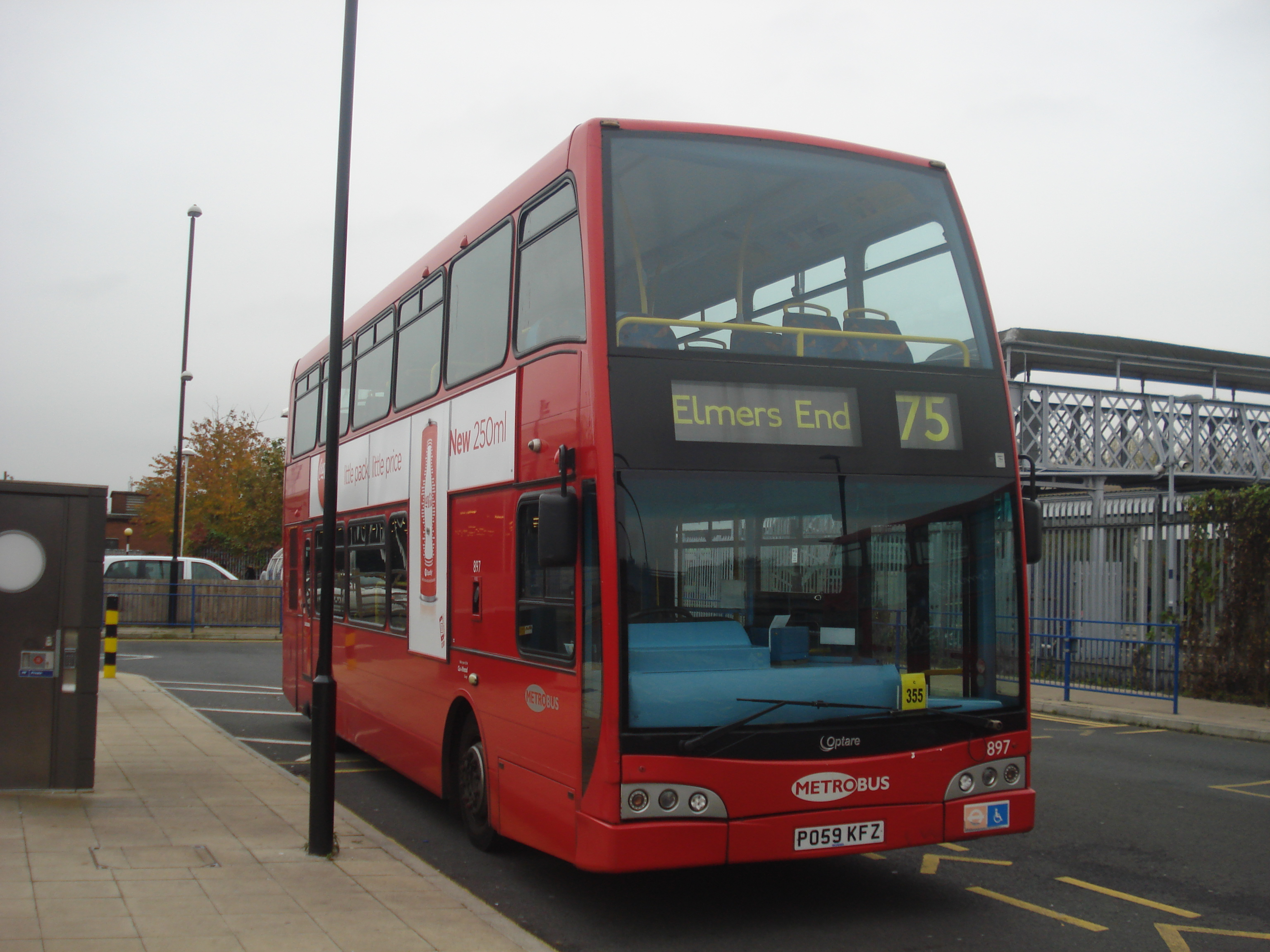
Metrobus Optare Olympus bodied Scania N230UD at Elmers End station in November 2013 whilst on diversion

Route 75 commenced operating on 15 December 1912 as a daily route between the Woolwich Ferry and South Croydon operated by Tillings Bus Company. The route was acquired by the London General Omnibus Company and extended from Croydon to Caterham Valley.

In 1950, route 75 worked from Woolwich Ferry by way of Charlton, Blackheath and Lee Green. AEC Regent III RT buses were used. In 1960 the route was extended, on weekdays only, to South Croydon, from West Croydon station. On 26 February 1977, Route 75 was converted to One Man Buses using DMS Buses from Daimler Fleet lines. On 25 July 1983 it converted to Leyland Titan (B15) Operation.

In 1991, route 75 was withdrawn between Woolwich and Blackheath and, later in the same year, ceased operating to Blackheath, being diverted to Lewisham station to terminate, additionally there was an extended Saturday shopping hours service to Surrey Quays. The route was also diverted in Sydenham, running to Woolstone Road and Mayow Road instead of the original Bell Green. In 1994 beyond Lewisham was abandoned to make the more or less current route of West Croydon to Lewisham, although, in that year, it was converted to single decker operation. In 1997 double deck operation resumed with Volvo Olympian. In 2002, the route was extended to Fairfield Halls.

In 2000, route 54 was curtailed to Elmers End (due to the new Tramlink) and so route 75 had become quite a busy route. Despite this, the night service of the route was withdrawn on 19 May 2007.

In November 2005 and February 2006, three cases of sexual assault were reported to have occurred on the route.

Upon being re-tendered the route passed from Selkent to Metrobus on 25 April 2009 with new Optare Olympus bodied Scania N230UDs introduced.

Upon being re-tendered the route returned to Selkent's Catford garage on 26 April 2014 with new Alexander Dennis Enviro400Hs.

== Current route ==
Route 75 operates via these primary locations:

- Croydon Fairfield Halls
- West Croydon bus station for West Croydon station
- Selhurst station
- South Norwood
- Anerley
- Penge East station
- Sydenham
- Perry Vale
- Catford and Catford Bridge stations
- Lewisham Hospital
- Lewisham Shopping Centre
- Lewisham station
