= East Lancs OmniTown =

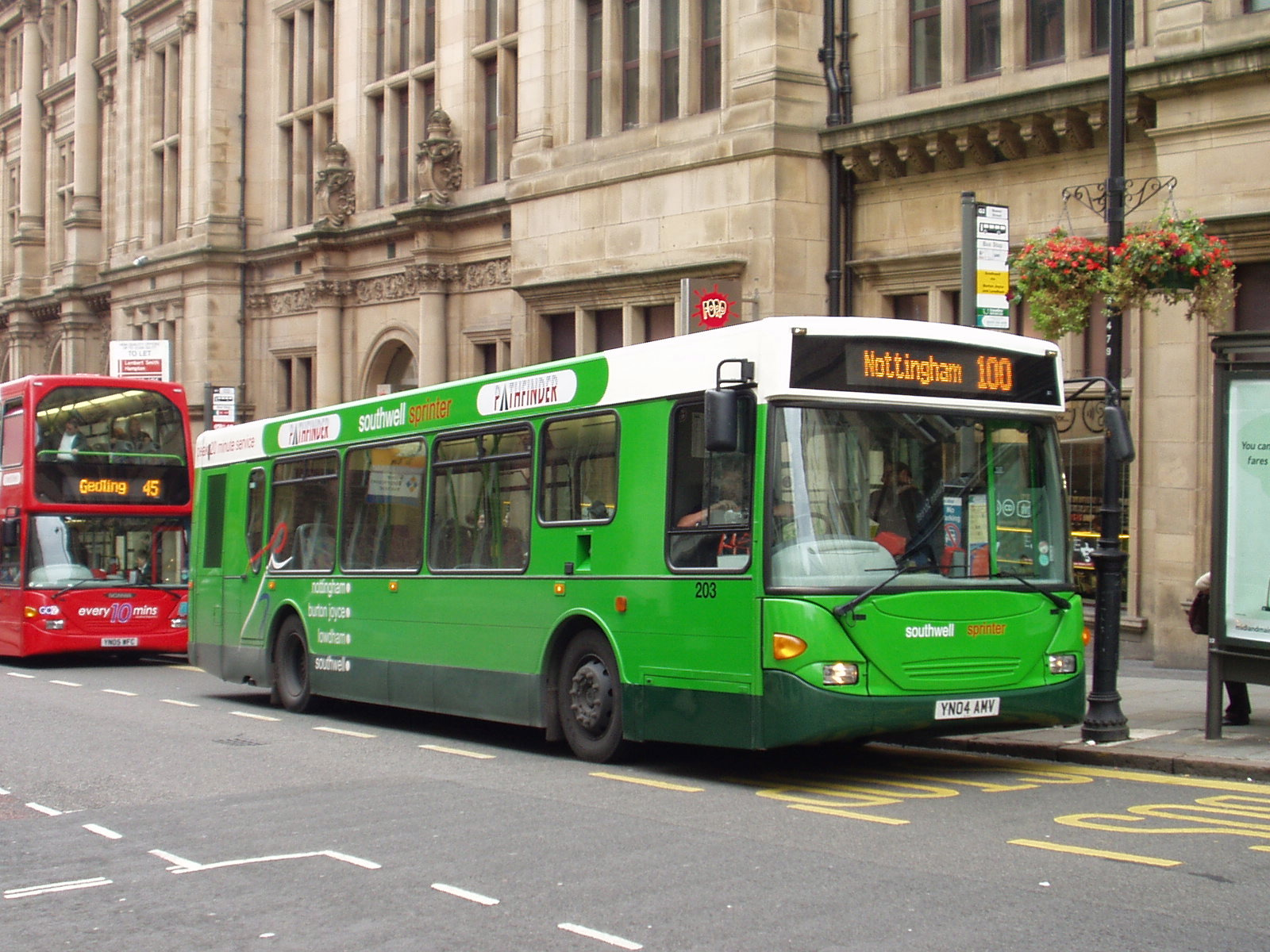
- A Scania N94UB/East Lancs OmniTown in Nottingham

Overview
- Manufacturer: East Lancs/Scania
- Production: 2004

Body and chassis
- Doors: 1 door or 2 doors
- Floor type: Low floor
- Chassis: Scania N94UB
- Related: East Lancs OmniDekka; East Lancs Myllennium

Powertrain
- Engine: Scania
- Capacity: 26 to 39 seated
- Transmission: Voith; ZF Automatic

Dimensions
- Length: 9.1–10.8 m (29 ft 10 in – 35 ft 5 in)
- Width: 2.5 m (8 ft 2 in)
- Height: 3.0 m (9 ft 10 in)

Chronology
- Successor: Scania OmniCity; East Lancs Esteem

The East Lancs OmniTown was a low-floor midibus body sold in the United Kingdom by East Lancs and Scania. It used the Scania N94UB chassis, which is the single-decker version of the N94UD double-decker chassis, with East Lancashire Coachbuilders bodywork. It is sometimes mistakenly referred to as the OmniTown chassis. The confusion concerning the chassis, and indeed the buses, arises due to the complexity of the OmniTown's and other Scania products' histories.

== History ==
A batch of N94UB chassis were bodied by East Lancs. In early 2002, receiving the Myllennium style of bodywork, as fitted to DAF SB220 and Dennis Dart SLF chassis. These were delivered to London Easylink, then were transferred to East Thames Buses as the ELS class, and were, in essence, OmniTowns, but lacked the Scania identity, the Scania badges were added the following year.

Mayne of Manchester also bought two Scania N94UBs with East Lancs Myllennium bodies in 2004. After the acquisition of its bus business by Stagecoach, they were renumbered 28506 (YN53GFJ) and 28507 (YN53PCV).

The first batch of OmniTowns with a different bodywork style to appear in the United Kingdom were delivered to Nottingham City Transport in 2004 for use on tram feeder services. The bodywork, in common with the OmniDekka, was built by East Lancs but received front and rear panels from Scania, to match the OmniCity/OmniDekka. The body only differed from the East Lancs Myllennium in terms of the front and rear panels.

In 2006, the OmniTown could temporarily be ordered with modified Esteem front and rear panels. This version is currently operating with Metrobus and Plymouth Citybus. The central part of the bodywork was the same as the OmniTown.
