= London Buses route SL3 =

London Superloop express bus route

SL3
- Selkent Alexander Dennis Enviro400EV in Thamesmead in April 2026

Overview
- Operator: Selkent (Stagecoach London)
- Garage: Bromley
- Vehicle: Alexander Dennis Enviro400EV
- Peak vehicle requirement: 15 (February 2024)
- Began service: 24 February 2024
- Night-time: No night service

Route
- Start: Thamesmead
- Via: Abbey Wood; Bexleyheath; Sidcup; Chislehurst; Bickley
- End: Bromley North station
- Length: 14 miles (23 km)

Service
- Level: Daily
- Frequency: Every 12-15 minutes
- Journey time: 44-83 minutes
- Operates: 05:00 until 01:19

London Buses route SL3 is a Transport for London contracted Superloop express bus route in London, England. Running between Thamesmead and Bromley North station, it is operated by Stagecoach London subsidiary Selkent.

== History ==
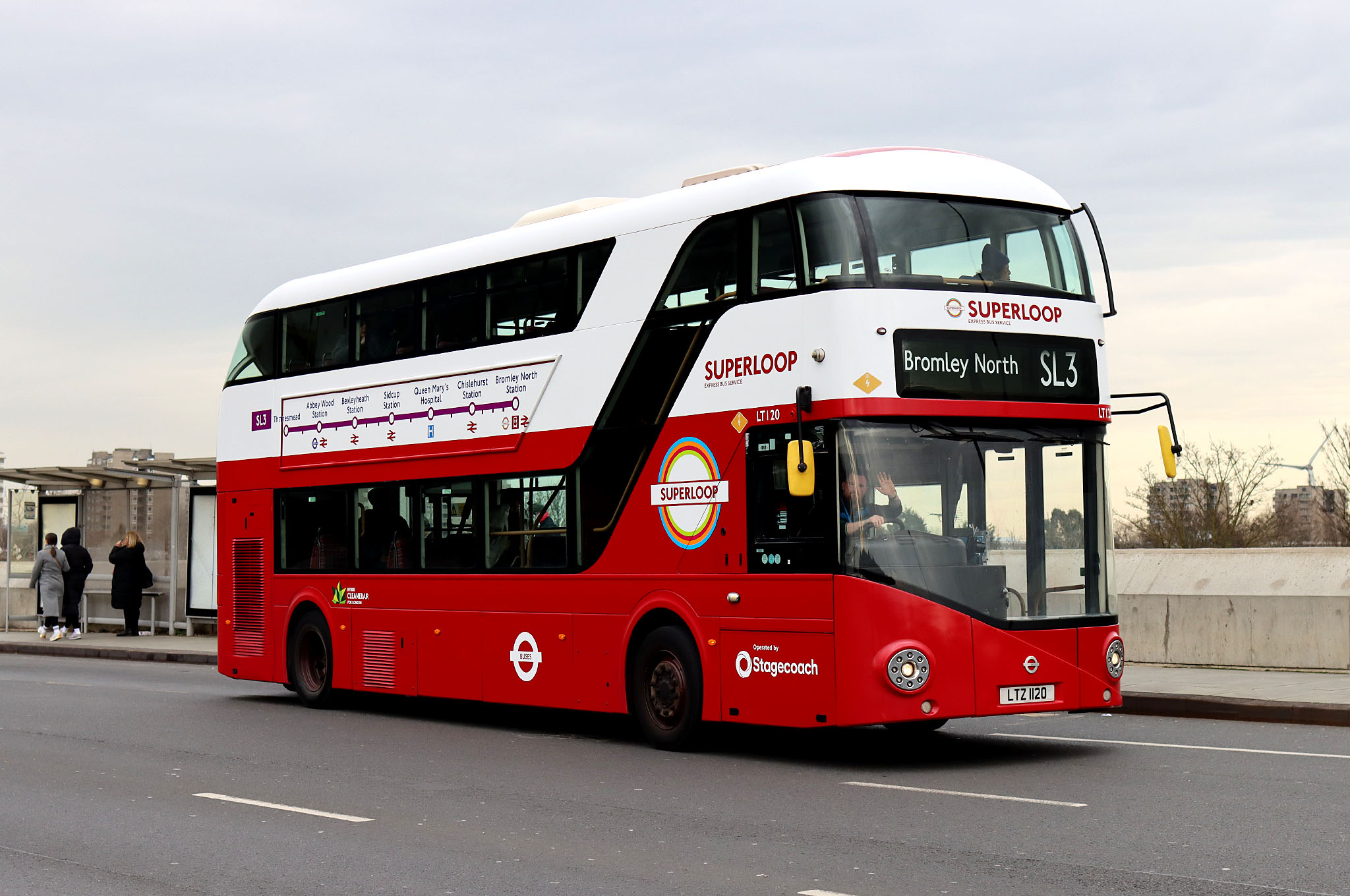
The route initially used New Routemasters when it launched

On 21 July 2023, a consultation for route SL3 was opened by Transport for London, and closed on 4 September the same year. The route parallels part of route 301 between Thamesmead and Bexleyheath, and part of route 269 between Bexleyheath Shopping Centre and Bromley North station. Route SL3 was awarded to Stagecoach London subsidiary Selkent on 20 October. TfL claimed that 67% of the feedback it received reflected that route SL3 would make their journeys more convenient, and 70% said the new route would reduce their travel time.

Route SL3 was introduced on 24 February 2024, using New Routemasters previously operated by London United on route 9. It is operated by Stagecoach London subsidiary Selkent.

After a competitive tendering process, the contract was reawarded to Stagecoach London subsidiary Selkent from January 2025 with the New Routemasters being replaced by new Alexander Dennis Enviro400EV buses.

== Current route ==
Route SL3 operates via these primary locations:

- Thamesmead
- Abbey Wood station
- Bexleyheath station
- Bexleyheath Central Library
- Sidcup station
- Queen Mary's Hospital
- Chislehurst War Memorial
- Chislehurst station
- Bickley station
- Bromley North station

== Operation ==
The route operates at a frequency of a bus every 12 minutes on weekdays and Saturdays and a bus every 15 minutes on Sundays.
