= London Buses route 42 =

London bus route

42
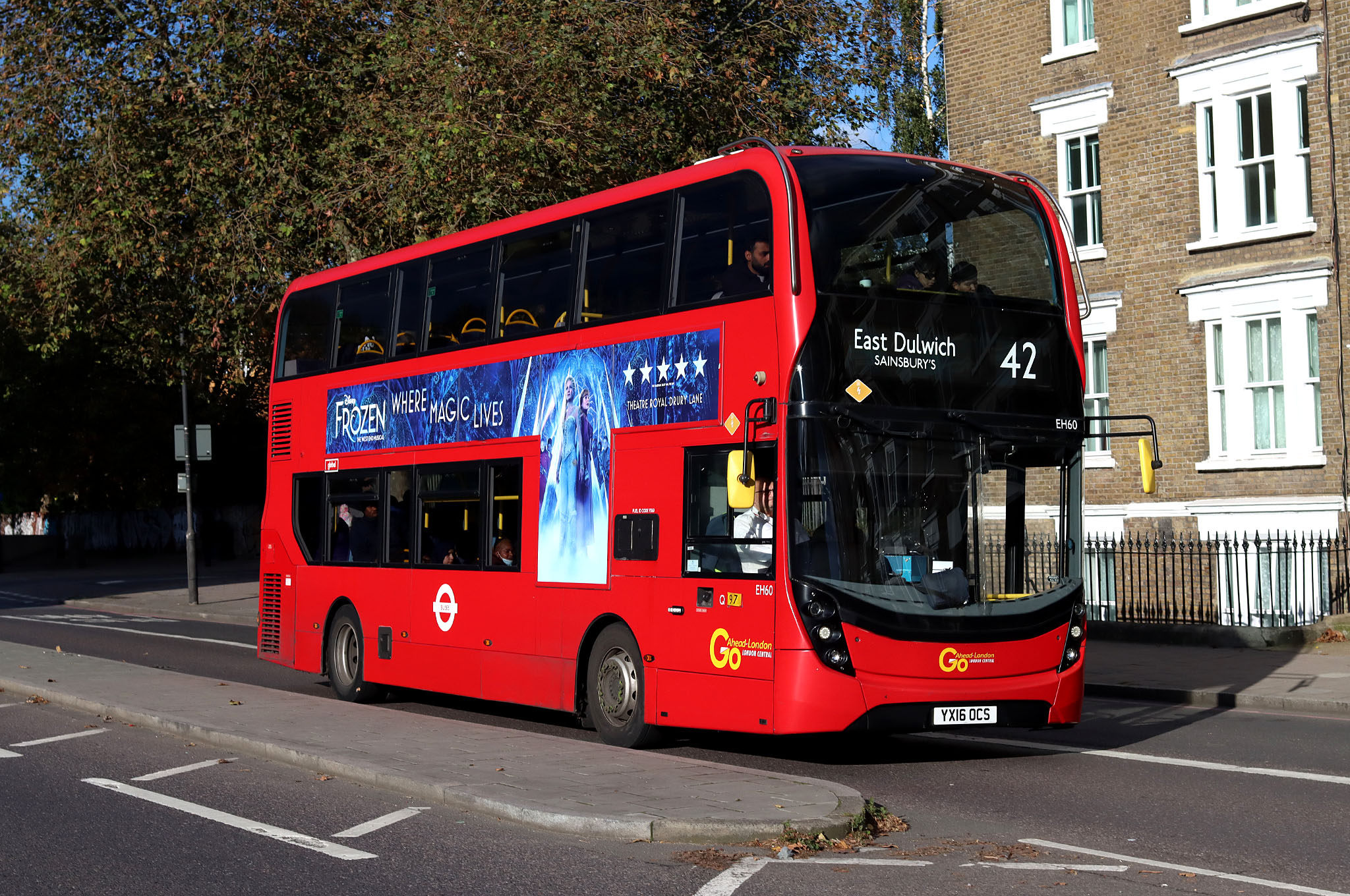
- London Central Alexander Dennis Enviro400H MMC on Old Kent Road in November 2023

Overview
- Operator: London Central (Go-Ahead London)
- Garage: Camberwell
- Vehicle: Alexander Dennis Enviro400H MMC
- Peak vehicle requirement: 10
- Night-time: No night service

Route
- Start: East Dulwich
- Via: Camberwell Green; Bricklayers Arms; Aldgate
- End: Shoreditch
- Length: 5 miles (8.0 km)

Service
- Level: Daily
- Frequency: About every 11-20 minutes
- Journey time: 23-55 minutes
- Operates: 05:00 until 00:30

London Buses route 42 is a Transport for London contracted bus route in London, England. Running between East Dulwich and Shoreditch, it is operated by Go-Ahead London subsidiary London Central.

== History ==
Route 42 commenced operation on 25 July 1912 as a daily route between Finsbury Park station and Clapton Pond via Seven Sisters Road, Amhurst Park and Upper Clapton Road. On 26 August 1912, it was extended from Clapton to Tower of London via Hackney, Whitechapel Road, Aldgate and Minories. From 14 April 1913 it was extended on Mondays to Saturdays from Tower of London to Camberwell Green via Tower Bridge, Old Kent Road and Albany Road.

The route was reduced from a daily allocation of eight vehicles at the beginning of 1970 to only three by 1985, when the evening service was also withdrawn. Upon being tendered, in 1987 the route passed to London Country South East.

Route 42 was included in the sale of Limebourne Buses to Connex in July 2001. Upon being re-tendered, it passed to London Easylink on 20 April 2002. However, on 21 August 2002, London Easylink went into liquidation.

Route 42 was taken over by Transport for London subsidiary East Thames Buses. On 3 October 2009, East Thames Buses was sold to Go-Ahead London, which included a five-year contract to operate route 42.

On 1 October 2016, the route was extended from Denmark Hill to East Dulwich via Dulwich Hospital with double-decker buses introduced. On the same date, the route was temporarily withdrawn between Tower Bridge Road and Liverpool Street bus station until 23 December 2016 while Tower Bridge was closed for refurbishment.

In 2021, the frequency of the service was reduced from 4.8 buses per hour to 4 during Monday-Friday peak times, and from 5 buses per hour to 4 during Monday-Saturday daytimes.

=== TfL route proposal: shortened to terminate at Tooley Street ===
On 24 July 2026, TfL opened a consultation to shorten the route from Liverpool Street to Tower Bridge Road, Tooley Street on a permanent basis. TfL said that the reason for the change was due to the increase in traffic in and around the Tower Bridge area, which made the route extremely unreliable. The consultation closes on 20 September 2026.

== Current route ==
Route 42 operates via these primary locations:

- East Dulwich Sainsbury's
- East Dulwich station
- North Dulwich station
- Denmark Hill station
- King's College Hospital
- Camberwell Green
- Walworth
- Bricklayers Arms
- Tower Bridge
- Tower Gateway station
- Aldgate station
- Liverpool Street station
- Shoreditch Appold Street
