= Elverson Road DLR station =

Docklands Light Railway station

Elverson Road
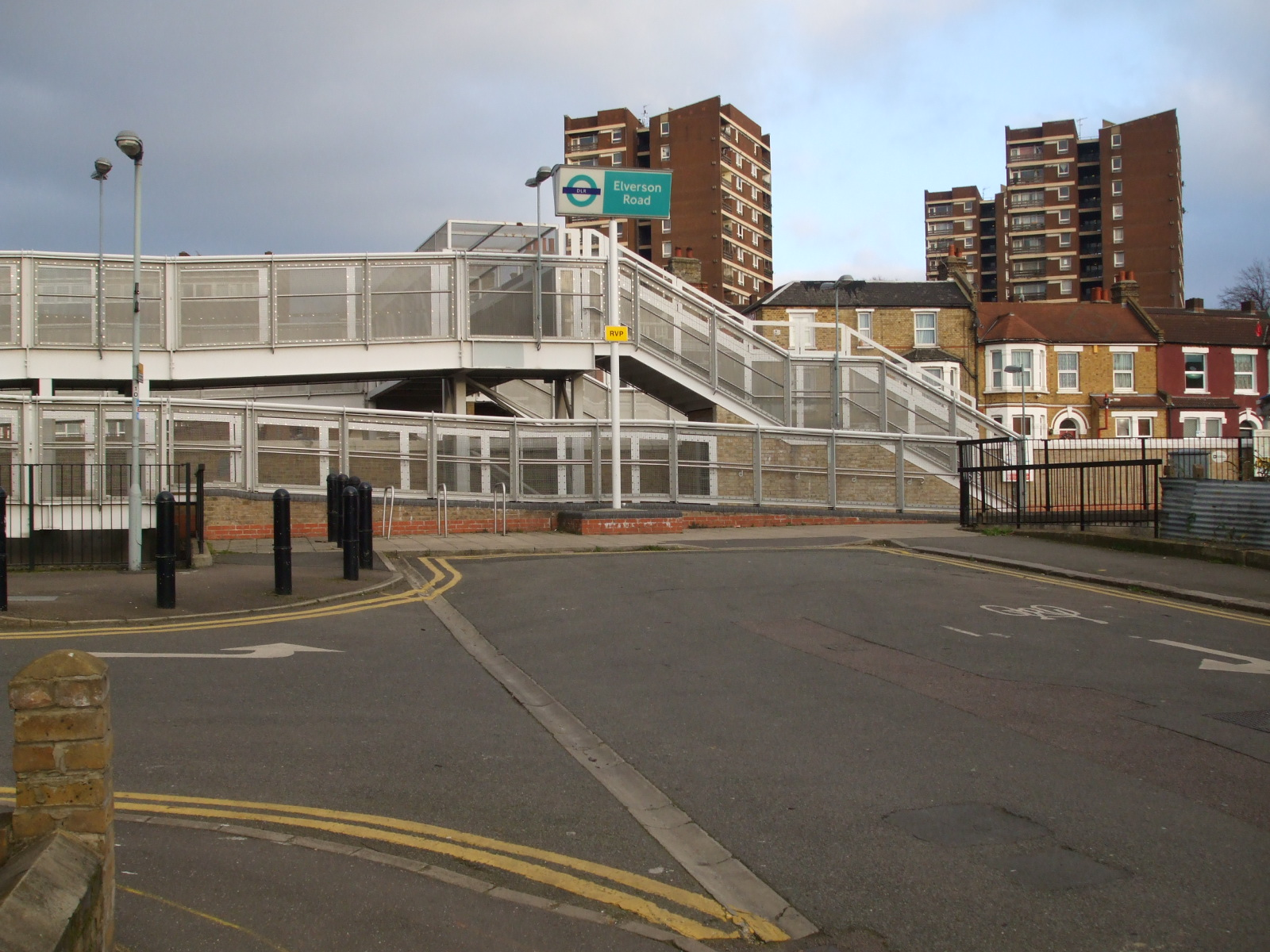
- Southwest entrance

General information
- Location: St Johns, Lewisham
- Coordinates: 51.4684°N 0.0162°W
- Owned by: Transport for London
- Managed by: Docklands Light Railway
- Platforms: 2

Construction
- Structure type: At-grade
- Accessible: Yes

Other information
- Status: Unstaffed
- Fare zone: 2 and 3
- Website: Edit this at Wikidata

History
- Opened: 1999

Passengers

DLR annual entry and exit
- 2020: ▼0.992 million
- 2021: ▼0.885 million
- 2022: ▲1.350 million
- 2023: ▲1.470 million
- 2024: ▼1.32 million
Location
- Location in Lewisham

Elverson Road is a Docklands Light Railway (DLR) station in the St John's area of Lewisham in south east London, and situated in a residential neighbourhood. Opening in 1999 as part of the Lewisham extension, Elverson Road is one of the newer stations of the DLR network, situated between Lewisham and Deptford Bridge.

Upon opening, the station was one of the most lightly used on the DLR network, but traffic has increased significantly following the construction of several new apartment complexes in the area.

The station is located between Deptford Bridge and Lewisham stations, and is on the boundary of London fare zone 2 and 3.

The station site straddles the boundary between the boroughs of Lewisham and Greenwich, and passengers must briefly cross into Greenwich when walking over the footbridge to reach the opposite platform.

Selective Door Operation is in use at this station as it cannot accommodate 3-car trains. Passengers wishing to alight at Elverson road must move towards the centre of the train (like Cutty Sark DLR) to alight.

== Services ==
The typical off-peak service in trains per hour from Elverson Road is:

- 12 tph to Bank
- 12 tph to Lewisham

Additional services call at the station during the peak hours, increasing the service to up to 22 tph in each direction, with up to 8 tph during the peak hours running to and from Stratford instead of Bank.

Preceding station	DLR	Following station
Deptford Bridge towards Bank or Stratford	Docklands Light Railway	Lewisham Terminus
