= East Dulwich railway station =

National Rail station in London, England

East Dulwich
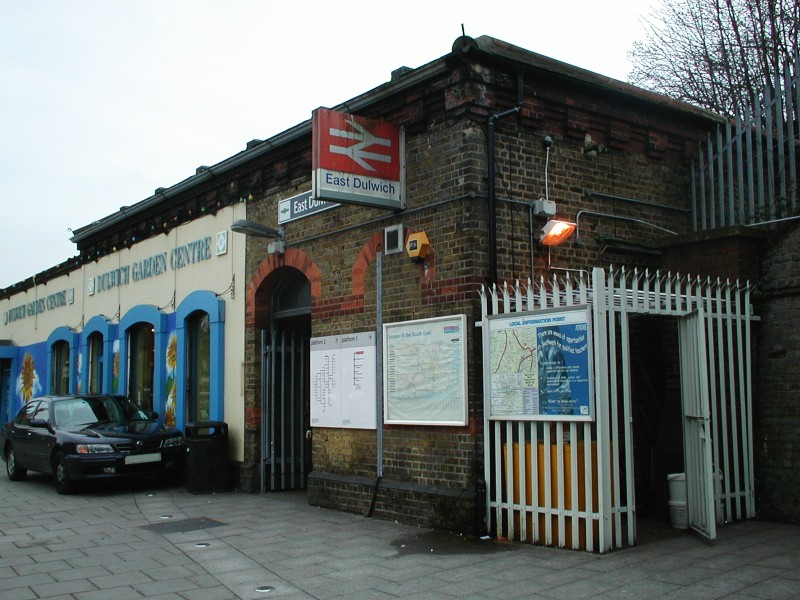
- Station building, 2006
- Interactive map of East Dulwich

General information
- Location: East Dulwich
- Local authority: London Borough of Southwark
- Managed by: Southern
- Station code: EDW
- DfT category: E
- Number of platforms: 2
- Fare zone: 2

National Rail annual entry and exit
- 2020–21: ▼0.456 million
- 2021–22: ▲0.916 million
- 2022–23: ▲1.041 million
- 2023–24: ▲1.177 million
- 2024–25: ▲1.336 million

Key dates
- 1 October 1868: Opened as Champion Hill
- 1 June 1888: renamed East Dulwich

Other information
- External links: Departures; Facilities
- Coordinates: 51.4616°N 0.0804°W

East Dulwich railway station is in the London Borough of Southwark in East Dulwich, south London. The station, and the trains which serve it are operated by Southern, and it is in London fare zone 2, 4 miles 23 chains (6.9 km) down the line from London Bridge. The station was named Champion Hill when it first opened in 1868. It stands where Grove Vale meets Dog Kennel Hill.

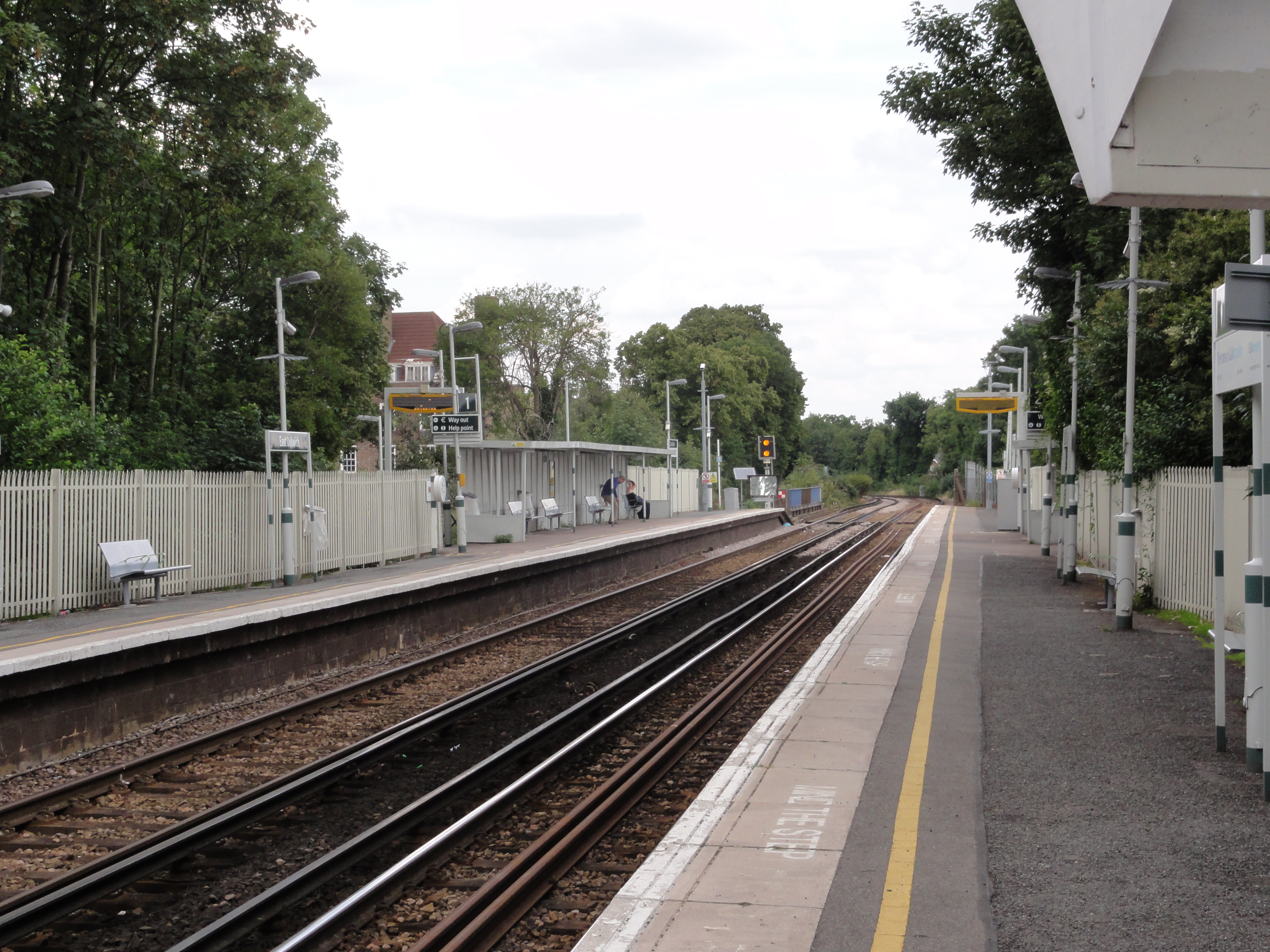
View of both platforms, 2011

== Services ==
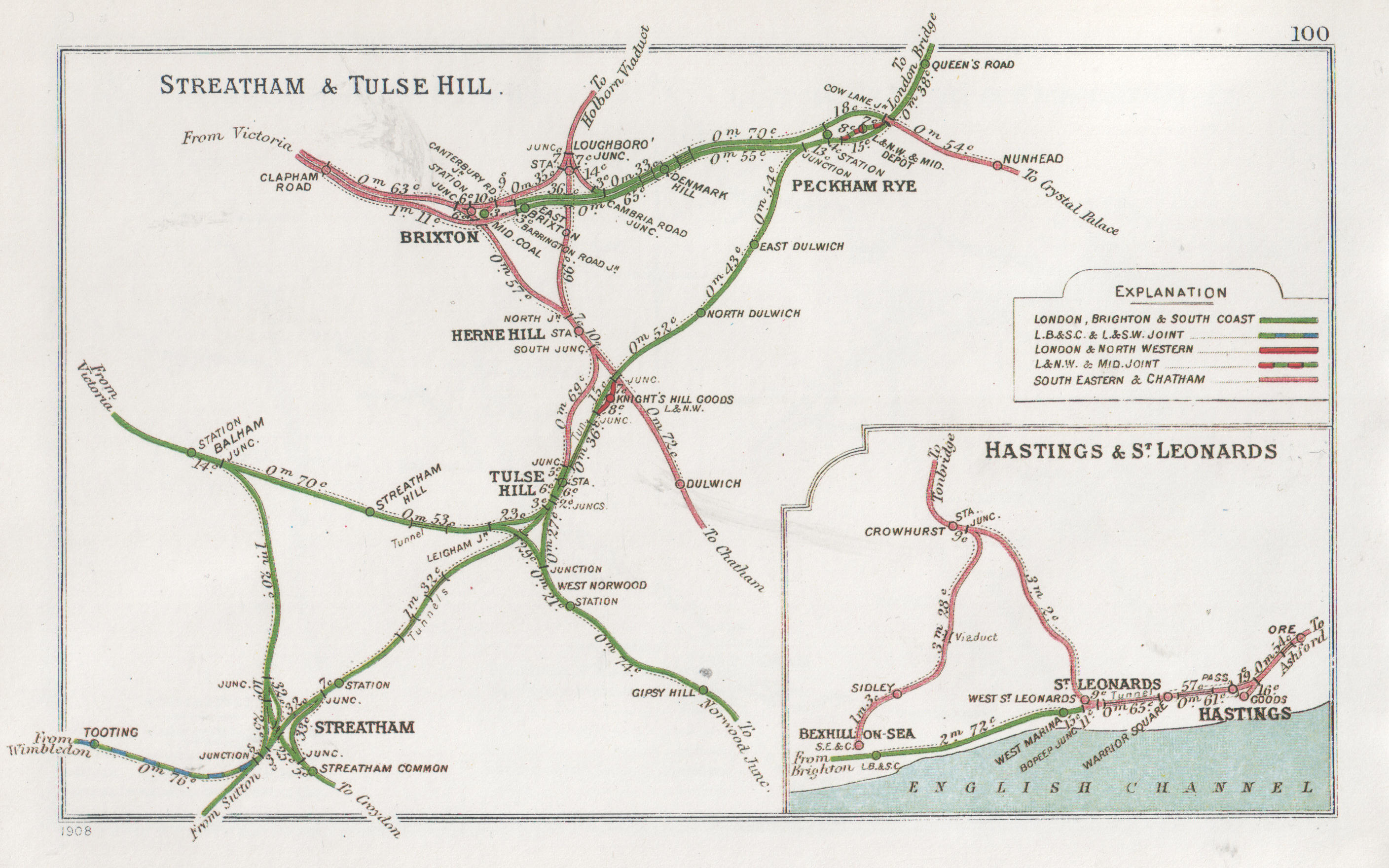
A 1908 Railway Clearing House map of lines around East Dulwich railway station.

All services at East Dulwich are operated by Southern using Class 377 EMUs.

The typical off-peak service in trains per hour is:

- 4 tph to London Bridge via Peckham Rye
- 2 tph to East Croydon via Norbury
- 2 tph to Beckenham Junction via Crystal Palace

During the evenings (after approximately 20:00), the service between London Bridge and Beckenham Junction is reduced to hourly. This service does not run on Sundays.

Preceding station	National Rail	Following station
Peckham Rye	Southern London to East Croydon Crystal Palace Line	North Dulwich

== Connections ==
London Buses routes 40, 42, 176, 185, 484 and P13 serve the station.

== See also ==
- North Dulwich railway station
- Oyster card (pay as you go) on National Rail
