= David Howell (chaplain) =

British priest

The Reverend David Howell
- Church: Church of England

Orders
- Ordination: 1959 (deacon), 1960 (priest) by Stretton Reeve

Personal details
- Born: David Howell; 31 May 1929 London, England
- Died: 11 November 2017 (aged 88) Wellington, Somerset, England
- Denomination: Anglicanism
- Education: Clifton Theological College

David Howell (31 May 1929 – 11 November 2017) was an Anglican priest and writer. The thrust of his ministry was in the area of health and healing, including posts as Director and Chaplain of the Divine Healing Mission from 1981 to 1989 and Director of the Council for Health and Healing from 1991 to 1993.

== Personal life and education ==
Howell was born in London, England, on 31 May 1929. He trained for ordination at Clifton Theological College and graduated in 1956. Howell had Parkinson's disease for some years before his death. He died in Wellington, Somerset on 11 November 2017.

== Ordained ministry ==
Howell was ordained as a deacon in 1959 and as a priest in 1960, at Lichfield Cathedral by Bishop Stretton Reeve. He began his career as a curate at St. Martin's Church, Tipton from 1959 to 1962. He was then vicar of St Paul's Church, West Bromwich from 1962 to 1971. In 1971, he moved for a further decade to St John's Church, Deptford, where he oversaw major building works alongside his ministry, from 1971 to 1981.

In 1981, Howell was given the post of Director and Chaplain of the Divine Healing Mission. (Note: The Divine Healing Mission (later renamed the Crowhurst Christian Healing Centre) was a revival of the Ministry of Healing by the Church of England. It is located in Crowhurst, East Sussex.) He left the Divine Healing Mission in 1989 and retired from ecclesiastical duties the following year. From 1991 to 1993, he was Director of the Churches' Council for Health and Healing. From 1993 to 2000, he was appointed to the Diocese of Bath and Wells as the Honorary Diocesan Advisor on Health and Healing. Later in life, he led tours and lectures, many on architecture, for the University of the Third Age.

Howell published several books with the Divine Healing Mission, including Healing in the communion (1987), Anointing with Oil (1999), The Armour of God (1999) and Healing & Wholeness in the New Testament. In 1995, he wrote The Pain of Parting: Understanding the Grief Journey, a guide through the grief journey for the bereaved, in which he incorporated his own knowledge as an ecclesiastic and his experiences of bereavement.

== Bibliography ==
- Howell, David (1987). Healing in the communion. Divine Healing Mission – via Bokbörsen.
- Howell, David (1993). The Pain of Parting: Understanding the Grief Journey. Grove Books. ISBN 9781851742561 – via Google Books.
- Howell, David (1999). Anointing with Oil. Divine Healing Mission. ISBN 9781902991009 – via Google Books.
- Howell, David (1999). The Armour of God. Divine Healing Mission. ISBN 9781902991016 – via Google Books.
- Howell, David. Healing & Wholeness in the New Testament. Divine Healing Mission – via Bokbörsen.
