= London Buses route 53 =

London bus route

53
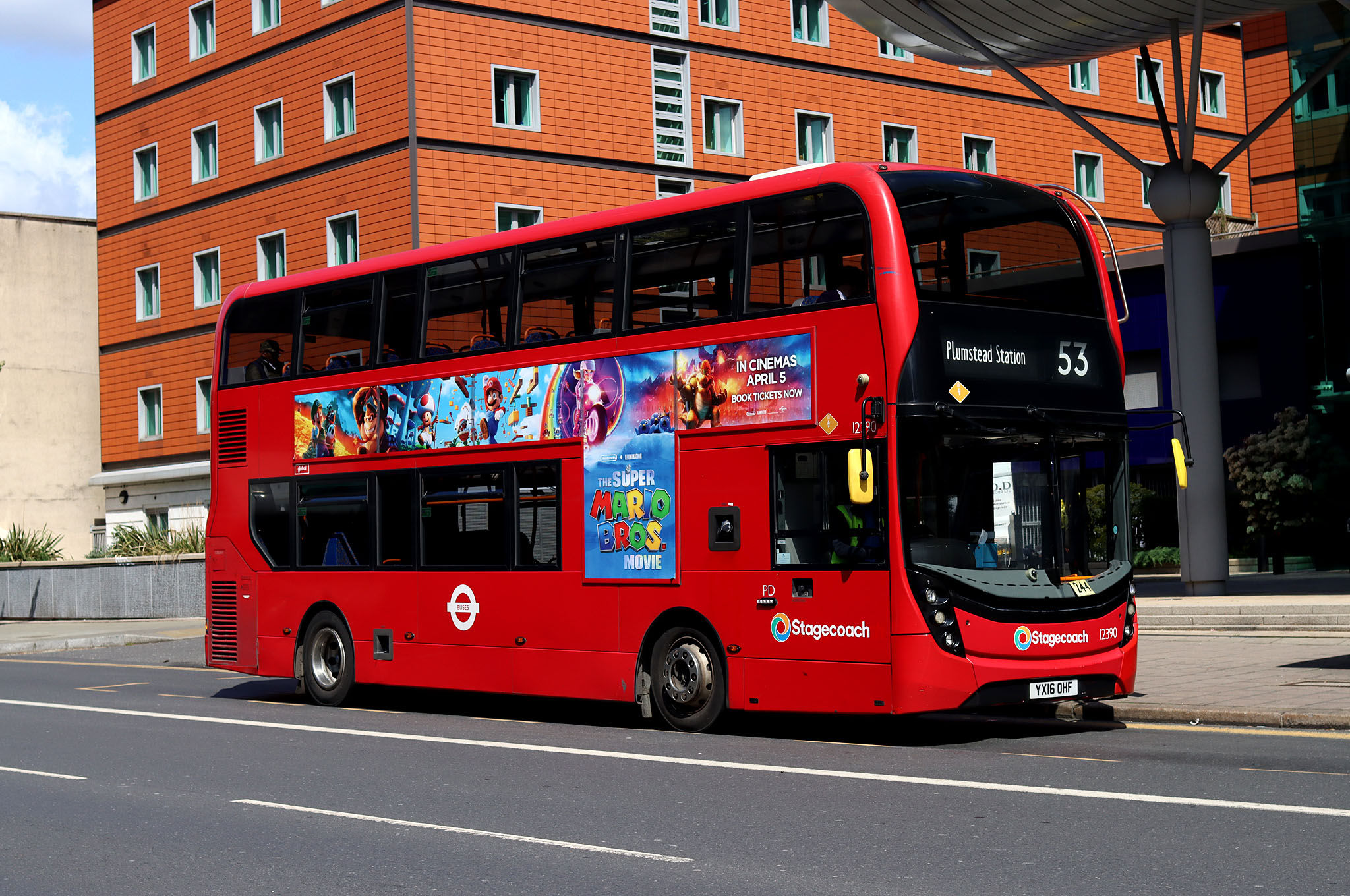
- Selkent Alexander Dennis Enviro400H MMC at Lambeth North station in May 2023

Overview
- Operator: Selkent (Stagecoach London)
- Garage: Plumstead
- Vehicle: Alexander Dennis Enviro400H MMC
- Peak vehicle requirement: 27
- Night-time: Night Bus N53

Route
- Start: Plumstead station
- Via: Woolwich; Charlton; Blackheath; Greenwich; Deptford; New Cross; Elephant & Castle
- End: Lower Marsh
- Length: 12 miles (19 km)

Service
- Level: Daily
- Frequency: About every 7-10 minutes
- Journey time: 48–96 minutes
- Operates: 04:05 until 00:16

London Buses route 53 is a Transport for London contracted bus route in London, England. Running between Plumstead station and Lower Marsh, it is operated by Stagecoach London subsidiary Selkent.

== History ==
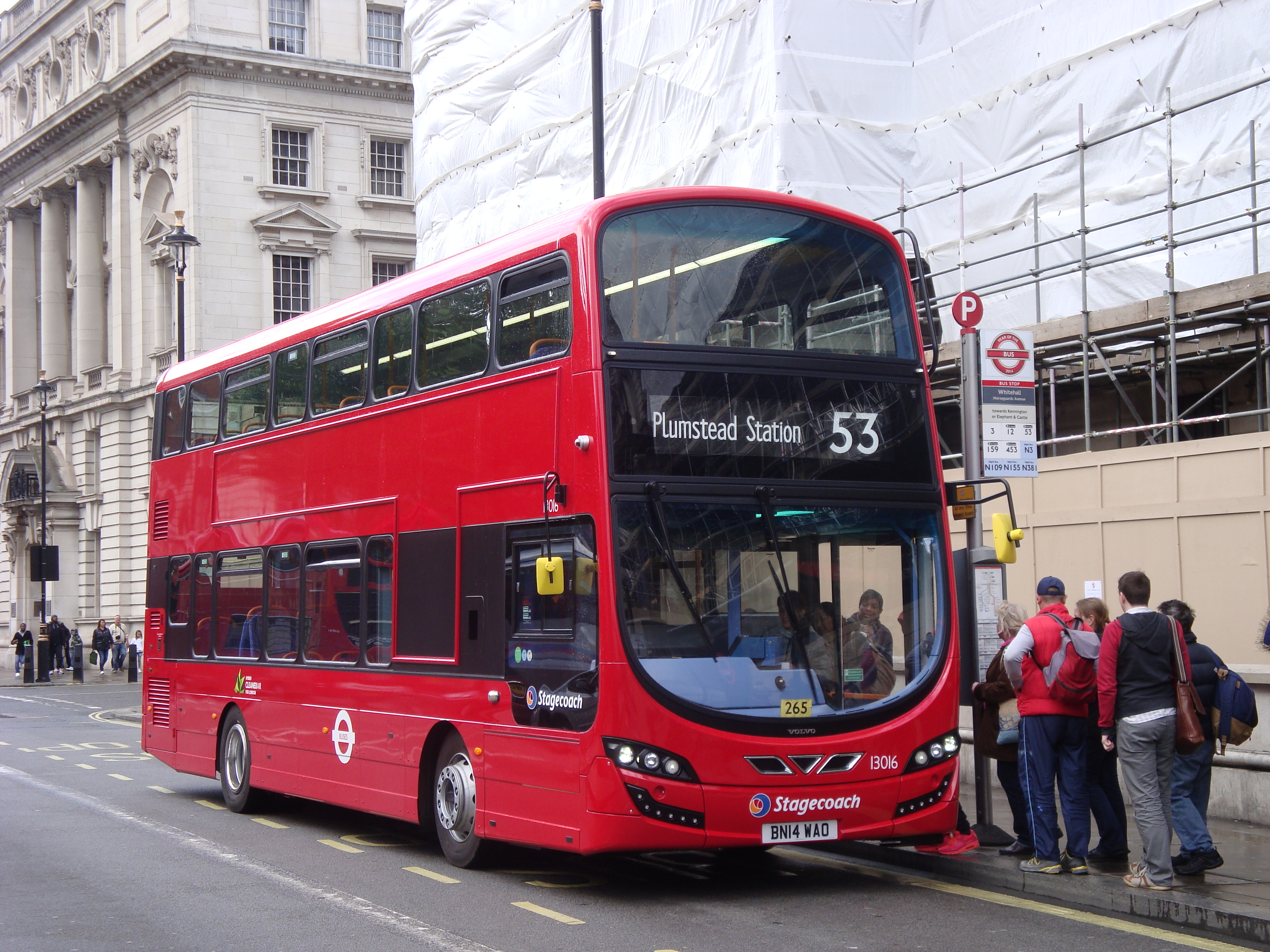
Stagecoach London Wright Eclipse Gemini 3 bodied Volvo B5LH on Whitehall in May 2014

Route 53 commenced operating on 22 October 1952 between Plumstead Common and Camden Town as a replacement for route 53A. In April 1958, the Sunday service was extended from Plumstead Common to Erith. This was withdrawn in May 1963. In 1967 AEC Routemasters replaced the AEC Regent III RTs that had operated the route since it commenced.

In October 1984 it was extended from Camden Town to Parliament Hill replacing route 3.

In 1995, 52 new Volvo Olympian double-deckers were bought for the route. Route 185 parallels part of route 53; following the collapse of London Easylink in August 2002, it was left with a limited service provided by a number of operators, and extra journeys on route 53 were operated between Westminster and New Cross Gate to relieve overcrowding.

The service is the only Transport for London contracted route to serve the section of the A2 road through Blackheath Hill. In April 2003 subsidence in a chalk mine beneath the road led to the road being closed and the route being diverted via Lewisham.

In November 2008, a bus travelling on the route was involved in a collision with a car in Woolwich. There were no serious injuries. Passengers stated that the bus driver had braked sharply to avoid a more serious collision, and he was praised by a spokesman for bus operator Selkent. In 2015, the route was curtailed to Lambeth North Underground station, completing the journey to Whitehall only at night.

When next tendered, it was retained by Stagecoach London with a new contract commencing on 23 July 2016, when it resumed terminating at Horse Guards Parade in Whitehall.

On 15 June 2019, the route was permanently withdrawn between Lower Marsh and Whitehall as part of TfL's Central London Buses Review.

== Current route ==
Route 53 operates via these primary locations:

- Plumstead station
- Plumstead Common
- Woolwich Arsenal station
- Charlton
- Blackheath Royal Standard
- Greenwich Park
- Deptford Bridge station
- New Cross station
- New Cross Gate station
- Old Kent Road
- Bricklayers Arms
- Elephant & Castle station
- Lambeth North station
- Lower Marsh
