= Deptford Bridge DLR station =

Docklands Light Railway station

Deptford Bridge
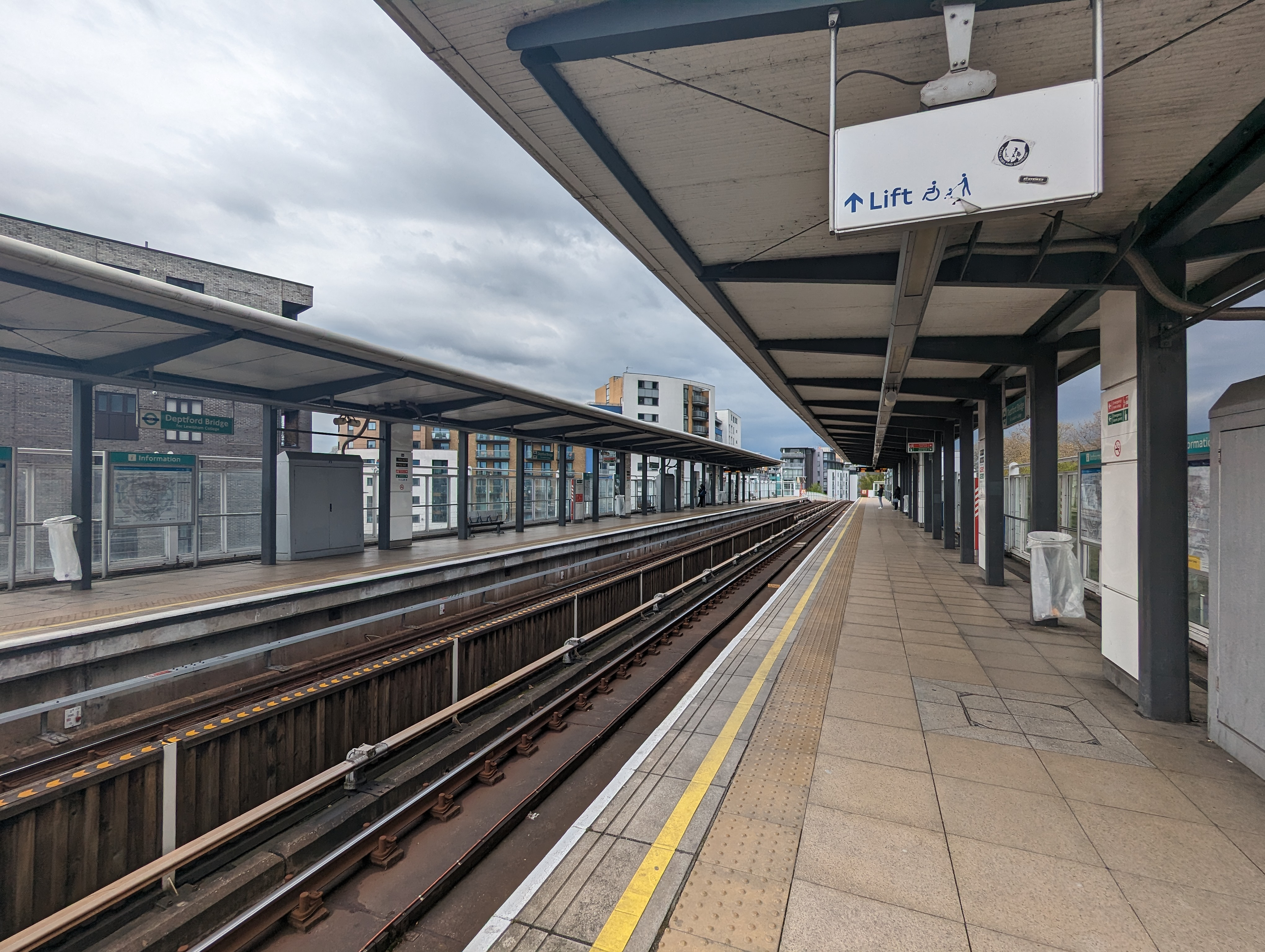
- Platforms looking south

General information
- Location: Deptford, Greenwich
- Coordinates: 51.4744°N 0.0225°W
- Owned by: Transport for London
- Managed by: Docklands Light Railway
- Platforms: 2

Construction
- Structure type: Elevated
- Accessible: Yes

Other information
- Status: Unstaffed
- Fare zone: 2 and 3
- Website: Edit this at Wikidata

History
- Opened: 20 November 1999

Passengers

DLR annual entry and exit
- 2020: ▼1.139 million
- 2021: ▲1.766 million
- 2022: ▲2.770 million
- 2023: ▲3.100 million
- 2024: ▼2.77 million
Location
- Location in Greenwich

Deptford Bridge is a Docklands Light Railway (DLR) station in Deptford, London in England. The station is elevated above both local roads and Deptford Creek, and is adjacent to Lewisham College and Deptford market.

== Location ==
The station is located between Greenwich and Elverson Road stations, and is on the boundary of London fare zone 2 and 3. It is sited in the Royal Borough of Greenwich and is very close to the boundary with the London Borough of Lewisham.

== Design ==
The station layout consists of two elevated side platforms which run roughly north–south over the A2 road and parallel to the River Ravensbourne. The station was proposed in 1989 further north as 'Deptford Creek' before an island platform in its current location was proposed in 1990 with lift access on both sides of the A2 - the design was changed to the current layout before construction, with lifts only on the south side.

The station was opened in 1999 as part of the southern extension from Island Gardens to Lewisham.

The station was largely reconstructed and considerably enhanced when it was extended to enable 3-car trains to call at it.

== Services ==
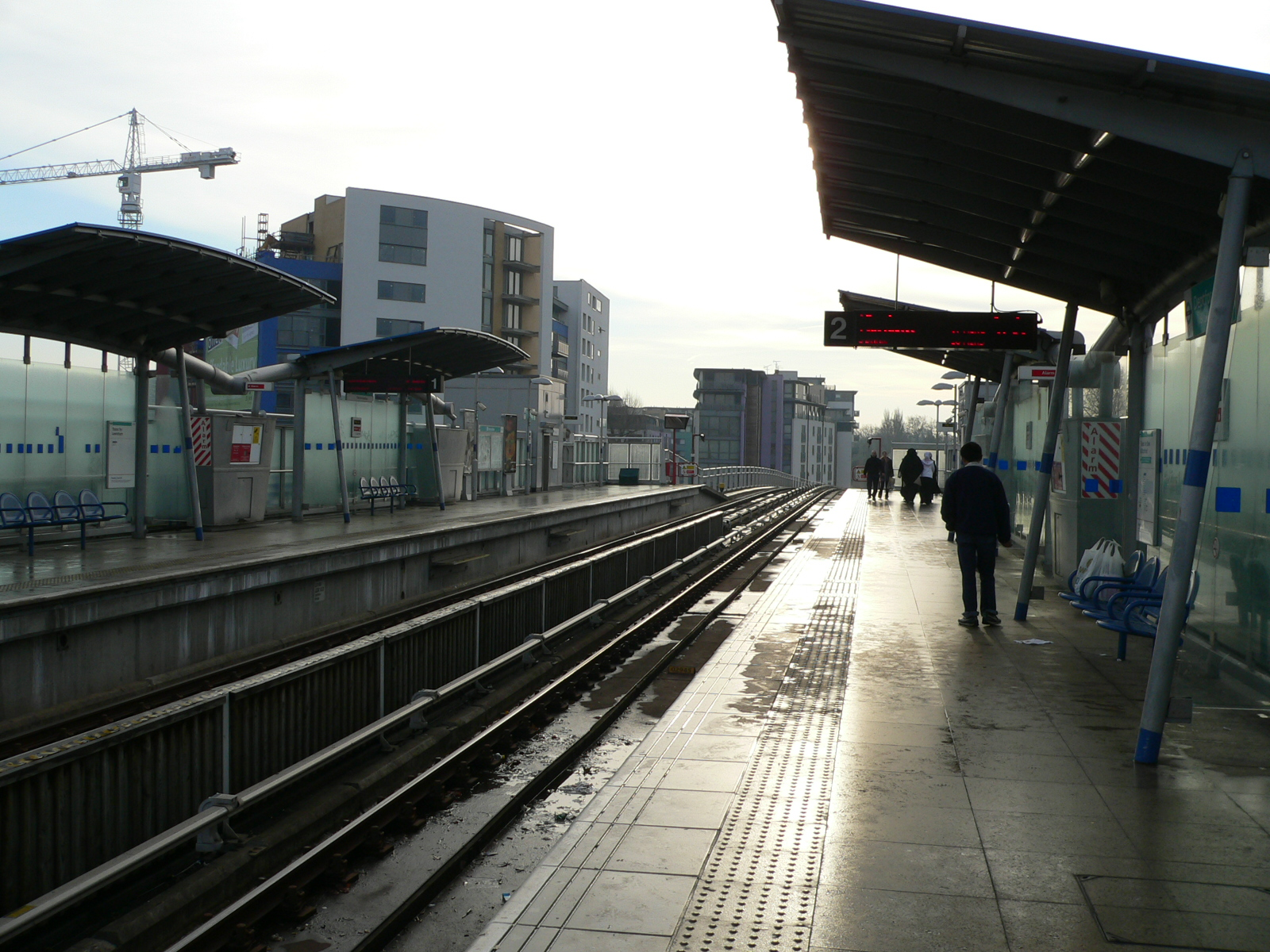
Deptford Bridge DLR Station before the 3 car capacity programme.

The typical off-peak service in trains per hour from Deptford Bridge is:

- 12 tph to Bank
- 12 tph to Lewisham

Additional services call at the station during the peak hours, increasing the service to up to 22 tph in each direction, with up to 8 tph during the peak hours running to and from Stratford instead of Bank.

Preceding station	DLR	Following station
Greenwich towards Bank or Stratford	Docklands Light Railway	Elverson Road towards Lewisham

== Connections ==
London Buses routes 47, 53, 177, 453 and night route N89 serve the station.
