= Selkent =

Bus operator in London and parts of Kent

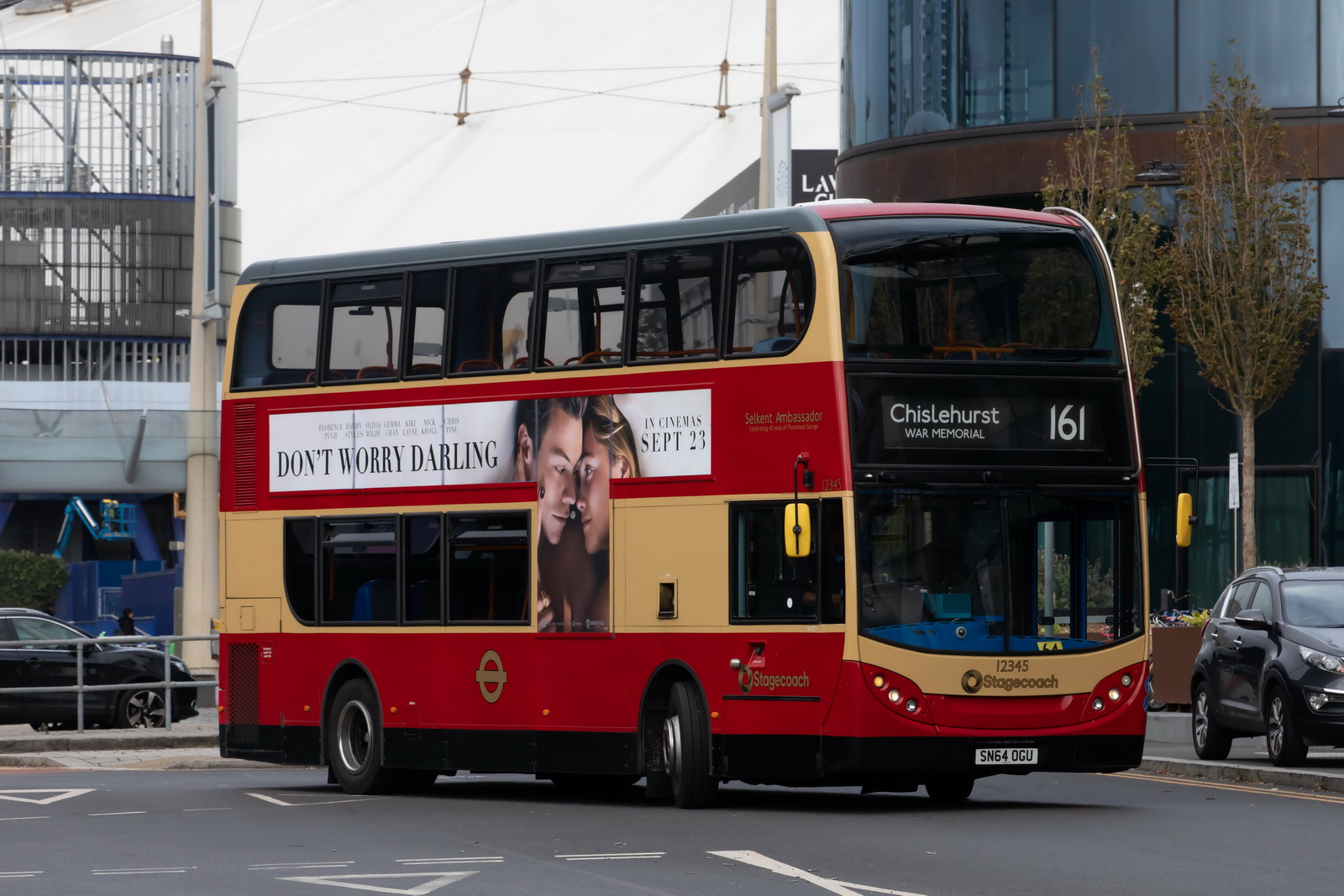
- 12345, the flagship Selkent Ambassador, an Alexander Dennis Enviro400H, near North Greenwich bus station in September 2022
- Parent: Stagecoach London
- Founded: 1 April 1989; 37 years ago
- Headquarters: West Ham
- Service area: South East London and Kent
- Service type: Bus services
- Routes: 40
- Hubs: Catford; Plumstead; Bromley
- Depots: 4
- Website: Official website

Selkent is a bus operator brand under South East London & Kent Bus Company Limited, trading as Stagecoach London. Selkent is a bus company operating in central and south London and some parts of north-west Kent. The brand is a subsidiary of Stagecoach London and operates services under contract to Transport for London. The Selkent brand is not publicly used since 2010 as all buses are branded as Stagecoach, but it exists as a legal entity.

Selkent shares its headquarters with sister company East London at West Ham.

== History ==
Selkent began as an operating district of London Transport in the early 1980s. On 1 April 1989, London Buses was divided into 11 separate business units, one of which was Selkent. The unit was the first London Buses subsidiary to completely cease operation of AEC Routemasters, with Catford garage's allocation on route 36B converted to use one-person operated dual-door Alexander PS bodied Dennis Lance single-deck buses in May 1992.

In 1994, Selkent was sold to Stagecoach Holdings at the same time as fellow subsidiary East London for £42 million (equivalent to £88,619,000 in 2025), with operations subsequently rebranded to Stagecoach Selkent. In November 2000, in line with the rebranding of the wider Stagecoach Group, Stagecoach Selkent and East London were consolidated under the Stagecoach London brand.

In August 2006, Stagecoach sold its London bus operations to Macquarie Bank for £264 million (equivalent to £456,239,000 in 2025). The new owner restored the Selkent name and hops logo. In October 2010, Stagecoach reacquired its old London operations for a reduced sum of £53 million (equivalent to £81,871,000 in 2025), with Selkent once again rebranded as Stagecoach London.

== Livery ==
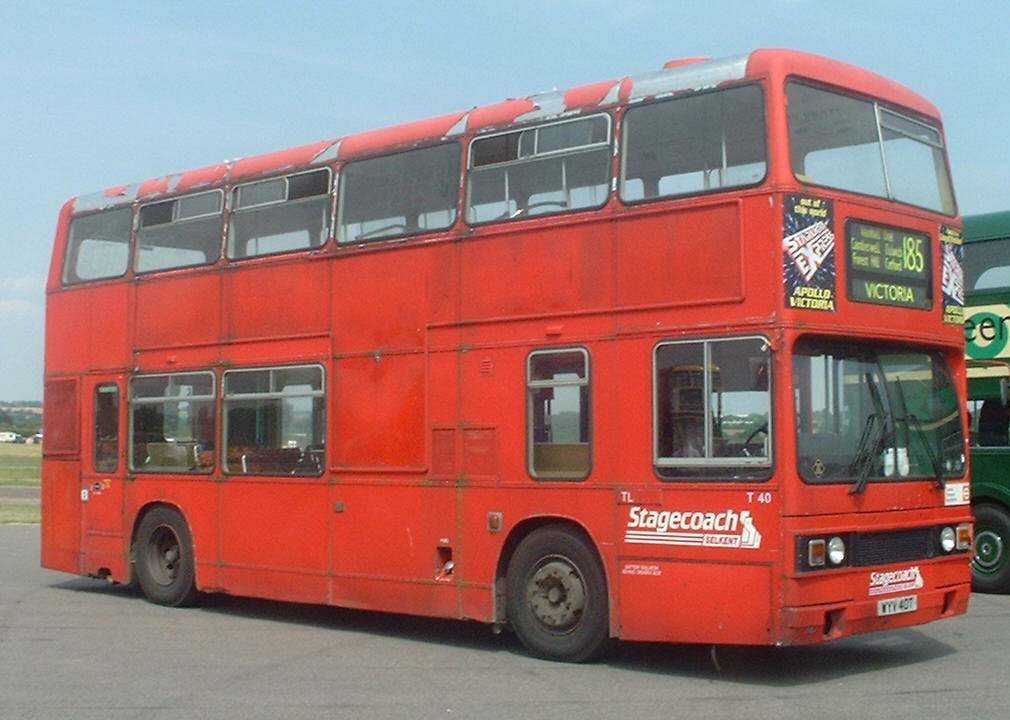
Leyland Titan in North Weald, June 2003, in Stagecoach Selkent all-red livery

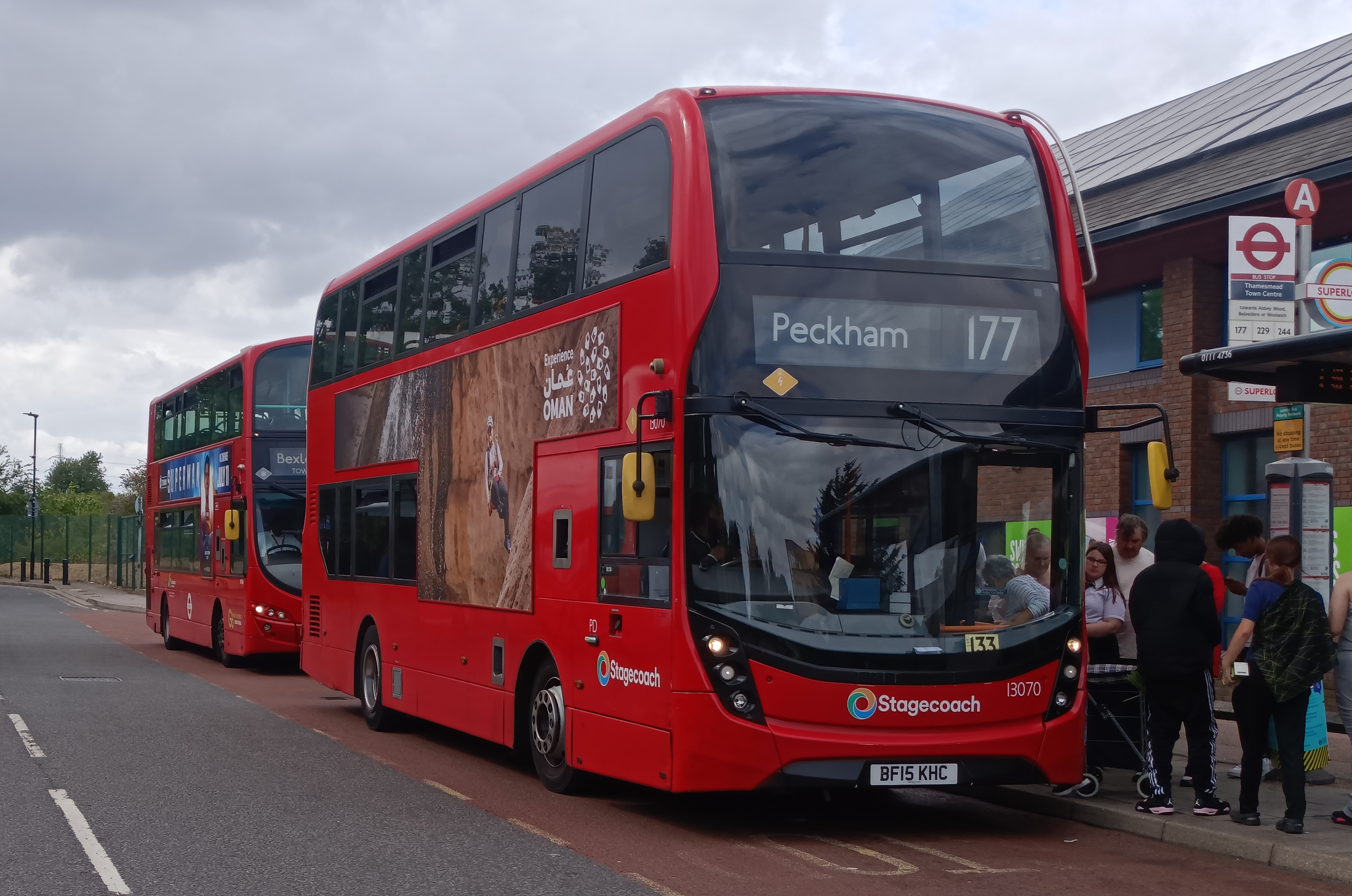
Alexander Dennis Enviro400 MMC bodied Volvo B5LH in Thamesmead in 2025, in current livery

Between 1988 and 1994, Selkent had a standard London Buses red livery with a grey skirt, though the fleet of dual-door Alexander PS types on Dennis Lance chassis delivered for use on route 36B in 1992 wore a grey, white, black and red livery. Following privatisation, Selkent adopted an all-red livery with white Stagecoach East London fleetnames. This was replaced by a new standard bus livery of a dark blue skirt and orange and light blue swirl at the rear, with Stagecoach's standard off-white replaced by red to conform with Transport for London contractual requirements for buses on TfL services to be 80% red. While the company was owned by Macquarie Bank, an all-red livery was introduced, which was retained by Stagecoach to remain compliant with updated TfL livery regulations.

== Garages ==
Selkent operates four bus garages.

=== Bromley (TB) ===
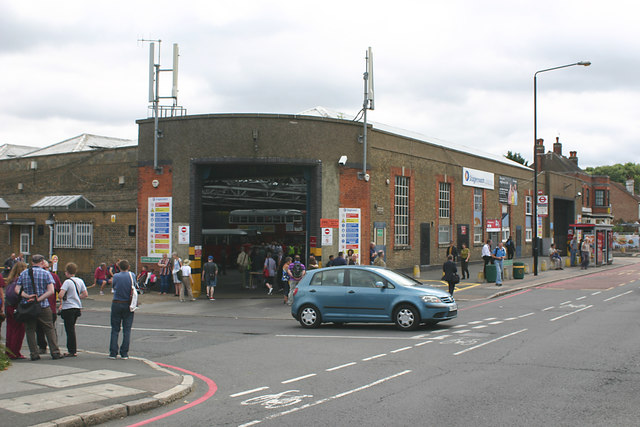
North western entrance of Bromley bus garage on Hastings Road, August 2016

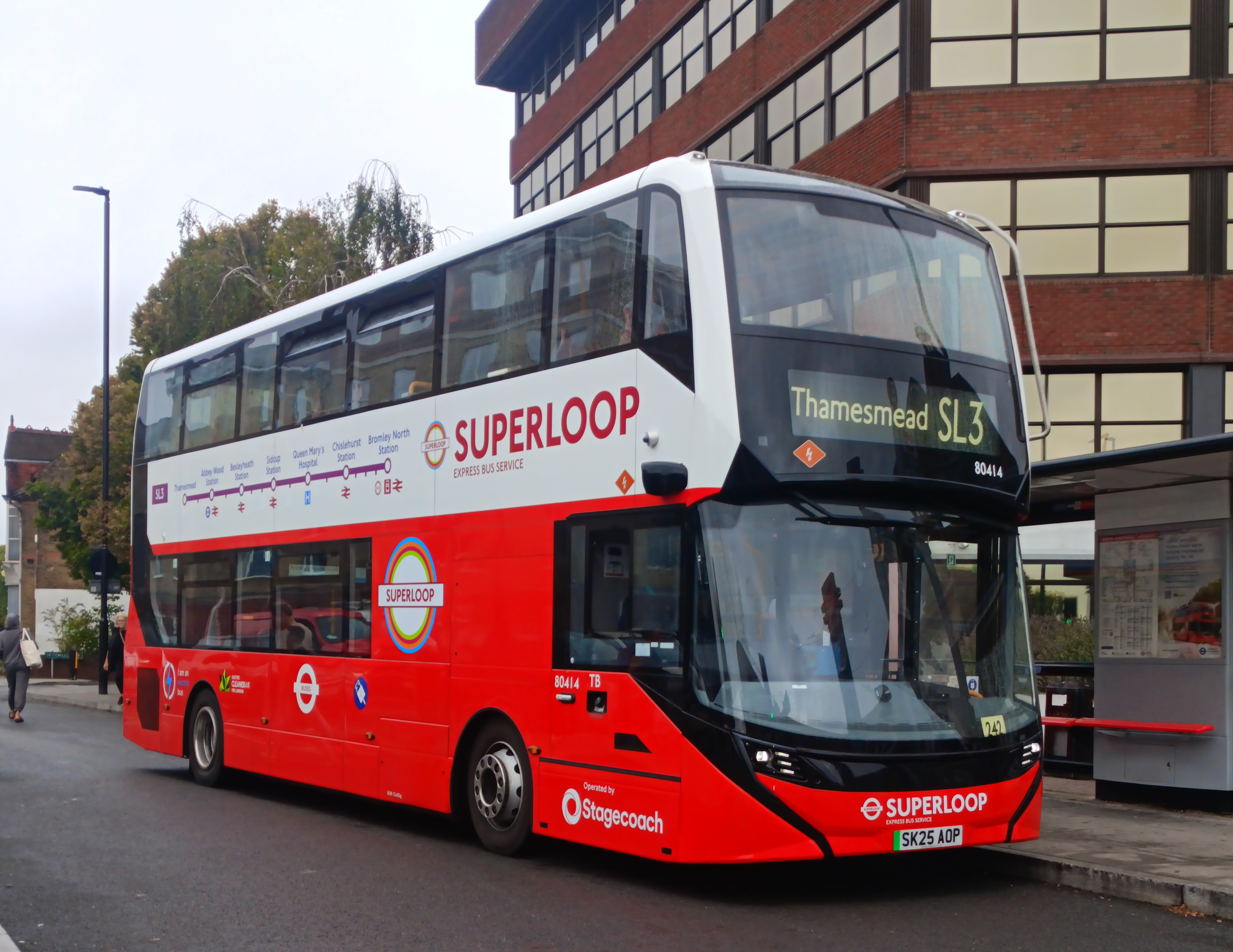
Superloop route SL3, operated using Alexander Dennis Enviro400EVs, is based from Bromley garage

Bromley garage operates routes 61, 146, 246, 261, 314, 336, 638, 684, B14 and SL3.

==== History ====
Bromley garage was opened by the London General Omnibus Company in April 1924. Built at a cost of £23,000, it was originally designed to house 60 buses, although the plan was to ultimately enlarge it to take an additional 40 when operations required it. Under an agreement reached with Thomas Tilling, the garage was allocated to the latter's use, along with Croydon and Lewisham, resulting in Tilling-type vehicles being the mainstay of the fleet until 1949, when the final petrol-engined STL-type double deckers were finally superseded. This was made possible by the hire of 17 AEC Regents from Leeds City Transport.

Between 1972 and 1979, Daimler Fleetlines joined the AEC Regent III RTs, running alongside them. AEC Routemasters were not introduced to Bromley until 1975, being replaced in 1984 by Leyland Titans. With regard to single-deckers, Bromley first housed RF-class AEC Regal IVs, arriving in 1952, which were gradually replaced by AEC Swifts between 1968 and 1971. FS-class Ford Transit minibuses were introduced in 1972 for local route B1, before these were replaced in 1976 by BS-class Bristol LHSs. These were in turn replaced by longer, BL-class Bristol LHs in 1978. In 1977 Leyland Nationals replaced the last of the SMSs, and ran alongside the BLs until 1985, when Bromley became the domain of Nationals and Titans.

In the early 1990s, the Nationals were replaced by Carlyle bodied Dennis Darts and MCW/Optare MetroRider midibuses. After the takeover by Stagecoach, some of the Titans were replaced by Volvo Olympians, before the fleet at Bromley began to be standardised on the Dennis Trident 2 and the Dennis Dart SLF. In slightly more recent years, a plot of land on the opposite side of the side road (Lower Gravel Road) was developed into an open yard for storage of the larger number of generally longer, taller, wider vehicles required for today's operations.

=== Catford (TL) ===
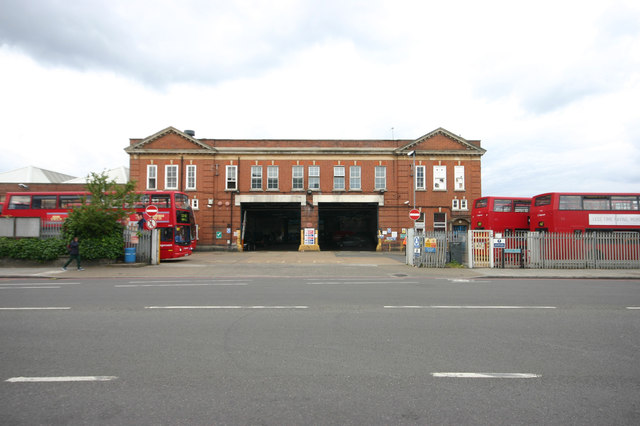
Entrance to Catford bus garage on Bromley Road, May 2014

Catford garage operates routes 47, 54, 75, 124, 136, 138, 160, 199, 208, 225, 273, 621, 660, 661 and N199.

==== History ====
Catford garage was opened in 1914 by the London General Omnibus Company; however, it was requisitioned by the War Department a year later and used to repair buses used as troop transports during World War I. The garage did not re-open until 1920, when Thomas Tilling's Lewisham operation moved there due to space constraints at his other garage. Originally coded L, for Lewisham, it was changed to TL in 1924 to avoid confusion with Loughton.

Thomas Tilling gained an agreement in 1923 to double the size of Catford and to open a new garage in Bromley to cope with the new housing estates that were springing up around the area. The roof has had to be raised twice, first in 1930 to enable double deck buses to use the garage and again in 1948 to accommodate AEC Regent III RTs.

By 1954, Catford was operating some 194 RTs, the last leaving in 1978. A Leyland-DAB articulated bus, the first such bus to operate in public service in London, was loaned to Selkent by South Yorkshire Transport in April 1992. Based at Catford, it was trialled primarily on route 180 as part of evaluations into replacing double-deckers on suburban London bus services as a form of bus rapid transit.

=== Kangley Bridge Road (KB) ===
Kangley Bridge Road garage operates routes 181, 284 and 356.

=== Plumstead (PD) ===
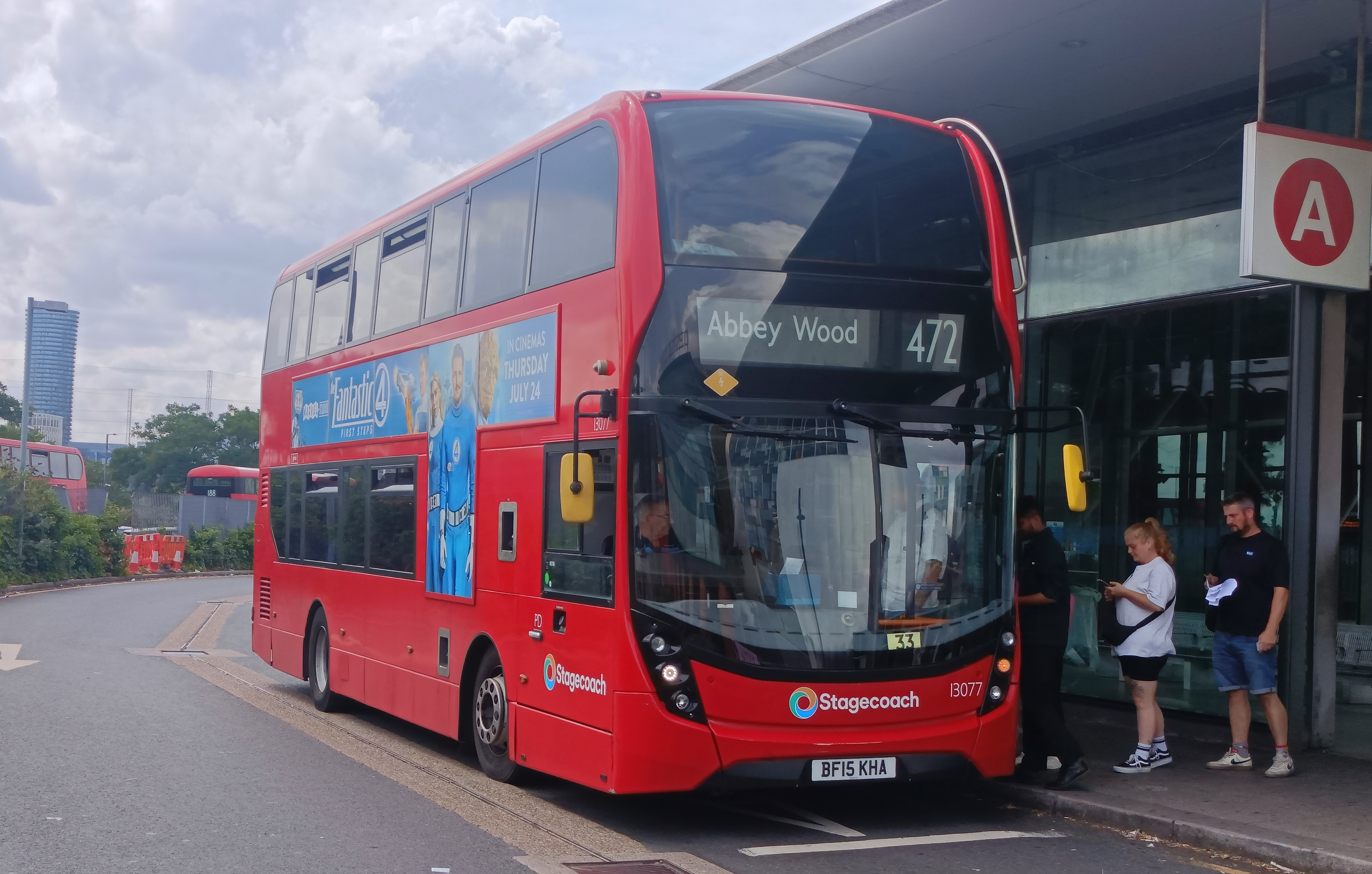
Alexander Dennis Enviro400 MMC bodied Volvo B5LH on route 472 at North Greenwich bus station, July 2025

Plumstead garage operates routes 53, 122, 161, 177, 180, 301, 380, 422, 602, 669, 672 and N53.

==== History ====
Originally intended to be called Thamesmead, Plumstead garage was built in 1981 to replace the existing Plumstead and Abbey Wood garages, additionally being sited to serve the growing Thamesmead area. Built to hold 185 buses, Plumstead initially had an allocation upon its opening entirely made up of Scania Metropolitans. By 1983, the garage had changed entirely to Leyland Titans, which by 1985 had begun to be phased out in favour of new Leyland Olympians.

A 96-seat Alexander bodied tri-axle Leyland Olympian destined for Citybus of Hong Kong was loaned to Selkent from Citybus' UK subsidiary Capital Citybus in July 1992. Based at Plumstead, it was trialled primarily on route 53 for a fortnight before returning to Capital Citybus for a week's trial on route 123, after which it was shipped to Hong Kong. The garage would later be home to 35 Mercedes-Benz Citaro articulated buses that worked on route 453 between March 2003 and April 2008, after which the service was operated by London General.

== Fleet ==
As of September 2014, Selkent had a peak vehicle requirement of 1000 buses.
