= East Thames Buses =

Former London bus operator

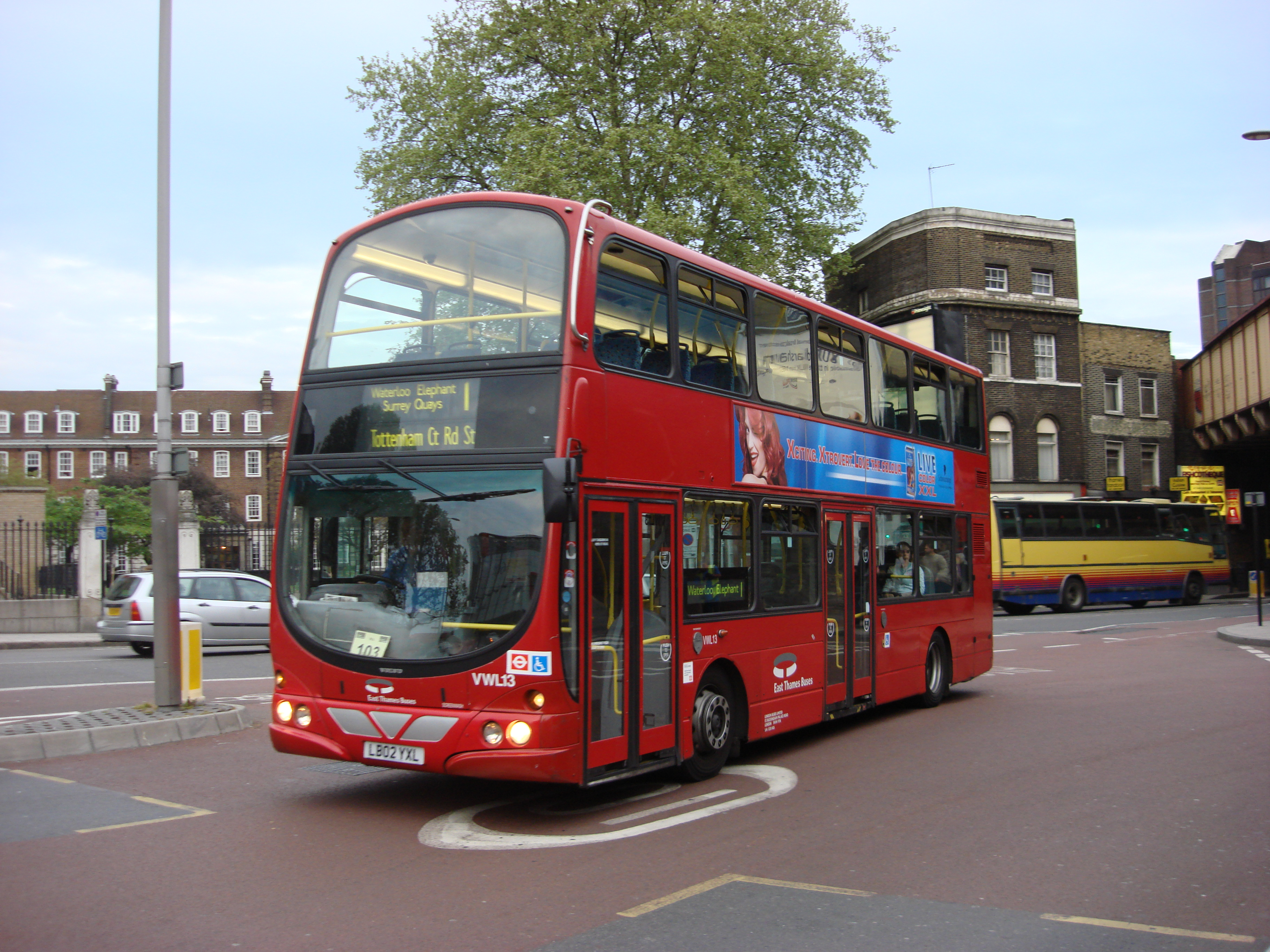
- Wright Eclipse Gemini bodied Volvo B7TL on route 1 in April 2007
- Parent: London Regional Transport; at time of inauguration, then Transport for London
- Founded: 1999; 27 years ago
- Defunct: 2009; 17 years ago
- Service area: Greater London
- Service type: Bus services
- Routes: 11
- Fleet: Volvo B7TL; DAF SB120; Scania OmniTown

East Thames Buses was a trading name of London Buses Limited, an arm's length subsidiary of Transport for London. In 2009, it was sold to Go-Ahead London.

== History ==
East Thames Buses was formed in 1999 to take over the services operated by the failed Harris Bus. It was then retained as an accredited operator to operate services in the event of their contracted operator being unable to do so. In August 2002 it was called in to operate routes 42 and 185 following the collapse of London Easylink.

On 3 October 2009 Transport for London sold East Thames Buses to Go-Ahead London.

== Garages ==
When it was formed, East Thames Buses operated from the former London Forest and Kentish Bus Ash Grove bus garage and Harris's Belvedere Garage. On 13 October 2005 Ash Grove was vacated and operations transferred to Mandela Way, Southwark.

=== Mandela Way - West (MA) ===
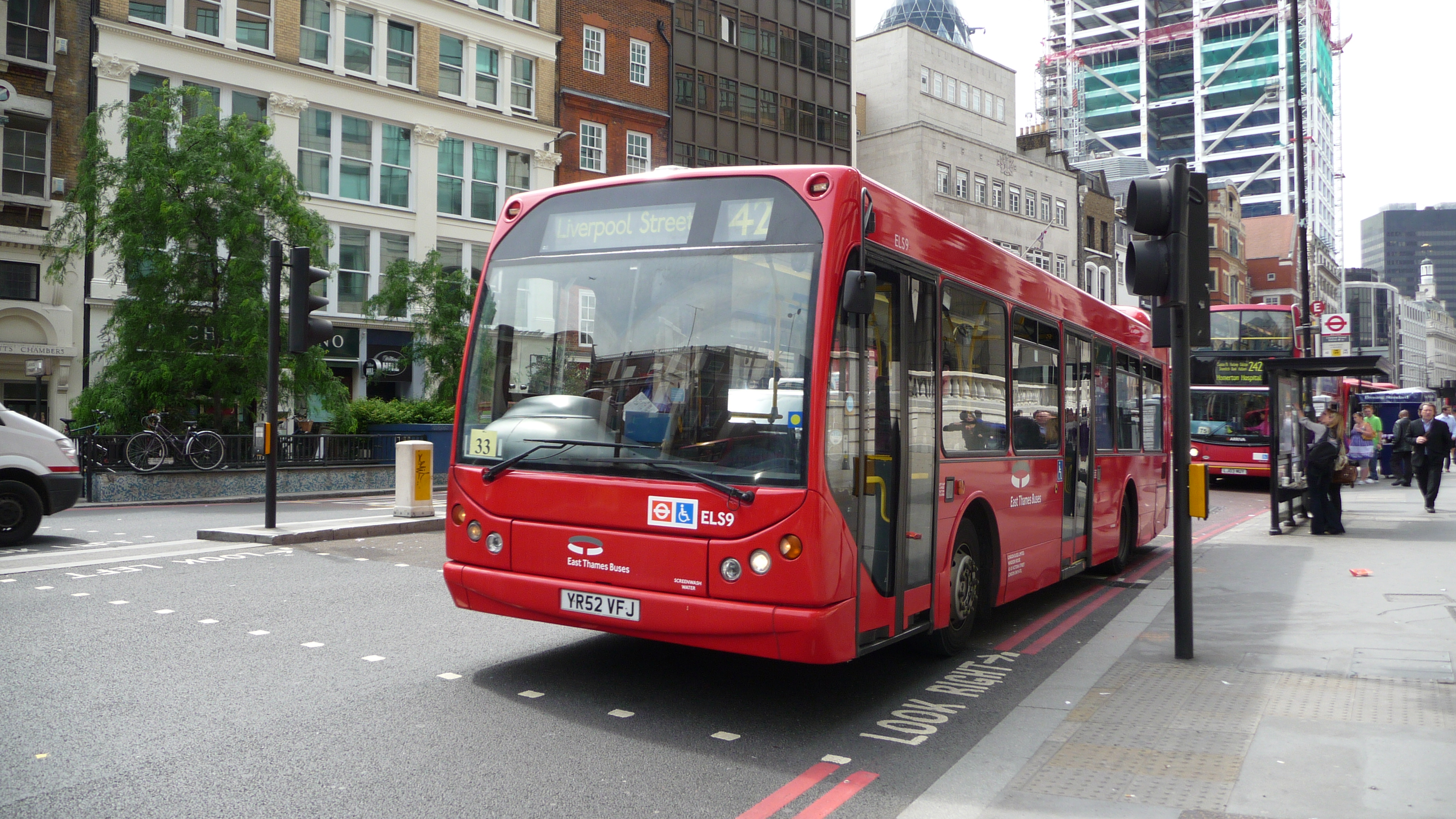
East Lancs Myllennium bodied Scania N94UB on route 42 in June 2009

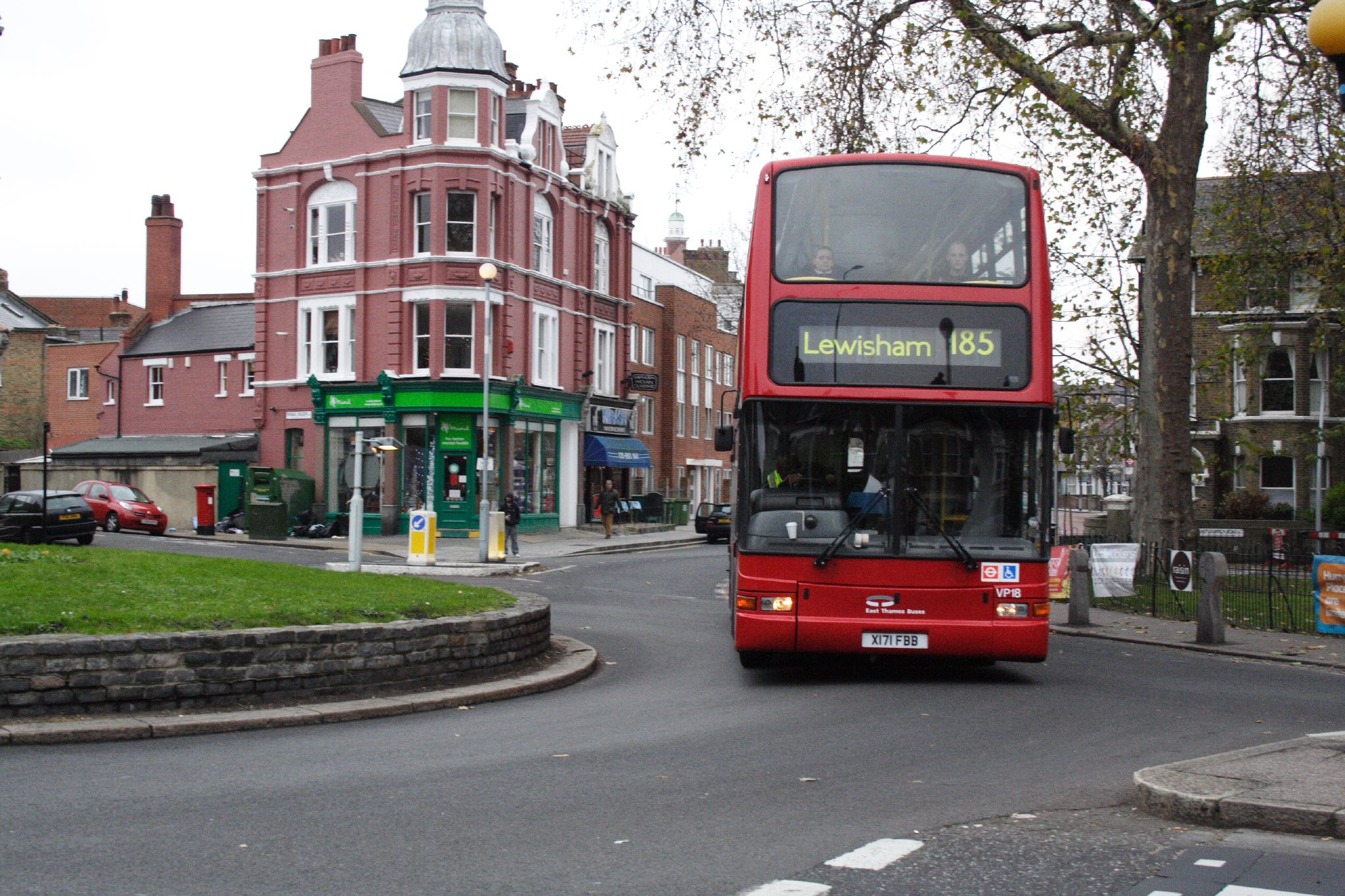
Plaxton President bodied Volvo B7TL on route 185 in December 2006

Mandela Way - West opened in late 2005 following the relocation from the existing base at Ash Grove. It had a Peak Vehicle Requirement of 53 buses and operated London bus routes 1, 42 and 185. When Mandela Way - West (MA) garage closed on 30 April 2010 it operated the following types of buses:

- Volvo B7TL 10m/Plaxton President (VP - Route 185, occasionally used on route 1)
- Volvo B7TL 10.6m/Wright Eclipse Gemini (VWL - Normally route 1)
- Scania N94UB 10.7m/East Lancs Myllennium (ELS - Route 42)
- Dennis Dart/Plaxton Pointers (on loan from London General)

Following on from Ash Grove's role, Mandela Way serviced the East Thames Buses fleet. In the last few months of East Thames Buses operation, route 1 moved next door to Mandela Way (MW) (the original London General depot) but were still maintained by the East Thames engineers.

Most of the routes once operated by Mandela Way - West were reallocated to London Central's & London General's other garages. The only exception was route 393 which has put back out to tender shortly after East Thames Buses took over the running of route 201 and moved to Mandela Way.

=== Belvedere (BV) ===
Belvedere garage was leased by Harris Bus in 1998 to house its operations that moved from Crayford. Harris Bus went into receivership in December 1999, and its routes and garage were taken over by East Thames Buses.

This garage has a peak vehicle requirement of 15 buses and operates routes 180 and part of 669 and N1. On 22 January 2011 route 244 transferred from London Central's Bexleyheath garage. Belvedere has always been classed as a satellite garage from an engineering point of view with very little routine maintenance ever taking place there, however limited engineering facilities existed at up until its parent garage changing to Bexleyheath.

Belvedere is now closed.

Belvedere garage ran the following models:

- Volvo B7TL 10.6m/Wright Eclipse Gemini

== See also ==
- List of bus operators of the United Kingdom
