= Gipsy Hill railway station =

National Rail station in London, England

Gipsy Hill
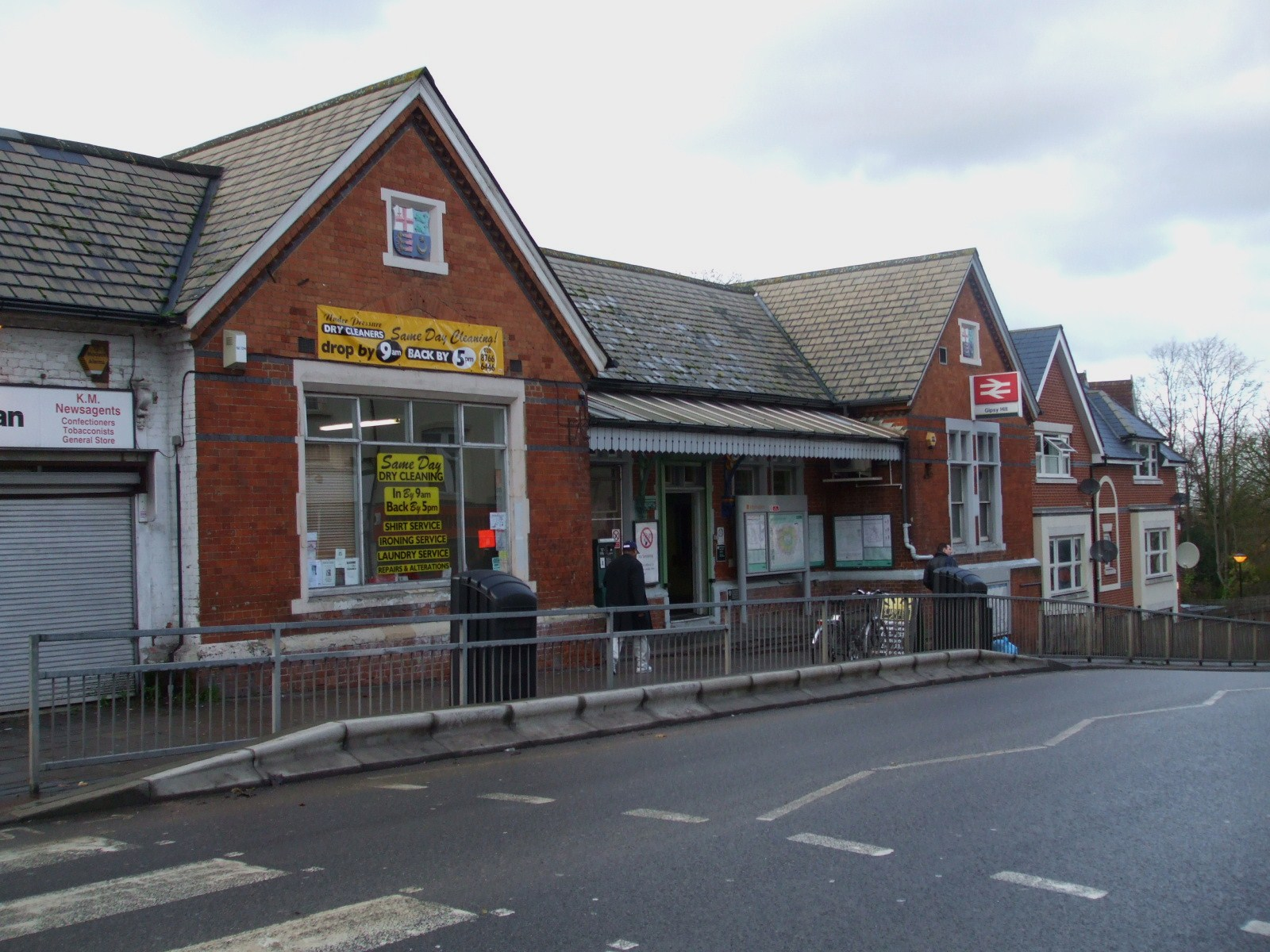
- Gipsy Hill (prior to 2009 refurbishment works)
- Interactive map of Gipsy Hill

General information
- Location: Gipsy Hill
- Local authority: London Borough of Lambeth
- Managed by: Southern
- Station code: GIP
- DfT category: E
- Number of platforms: 2
- Fare zone: 3

National Rail annual entry and exit
- 2020–21: ▼0.472 million
- 2021–22: ▲0.904 million
- 2022–23: ▲1.083 million
- 2023–24: ▲1.326 million
- 2024–25: ▲1.401 million

Key dates
- 1 December 1856: opened

Other information
- External links: Departures; Facilities
- Coordinates: 51.4246°N 0.084°W

Gipsy Hill railway station is in the London Borough of Lambeth in south London. It is situated on the Crystal Palace line, 7 miles 77 chains (12.8 km) measured from London Victoria. The station, and all trains serving it, are operated by Southern, and it is in London fare zone 3.

== Accidents and incidents ==
- On 14 February 1990, Class 455 electric multiple unit 5802 collided with a fallen tree obstructing the line. Unit 5820 then collided with 5802.

== Services ==
All services at Gipsy Hill are operated by Southern using Class 377 EMUs.

The typical off-peak service in trains per hour is:

- 4 tph to London Victoria
- 4 tph to London Bridge (2 of these run via Tulse Hill and 2 run via Forest Hill)
- 2 tph to West Croydon
- 2 tph to Beckenham Junction

During the evenings, the services between London Victoria and West Croydon do not run and the services between London Bridge and Beckenham Junction are reduced to hourly.

On Sundays, the services between London Bridge and Beckenham Junction do not run.

Preceding station	National Rail	Following station
West Norwood	Southern Crystal Palace Line	Crystal Palace

== Connections ==
London Buses route 322 serves the station, From the bus stop Gipsy Hill station.

== Gallery ==
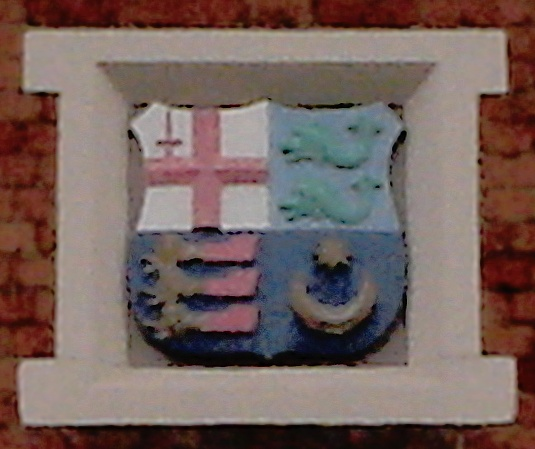
Detail of the London, Brighton and South Coast Railway's coat of arms, displayed above the entrance to Gipsy Hill station

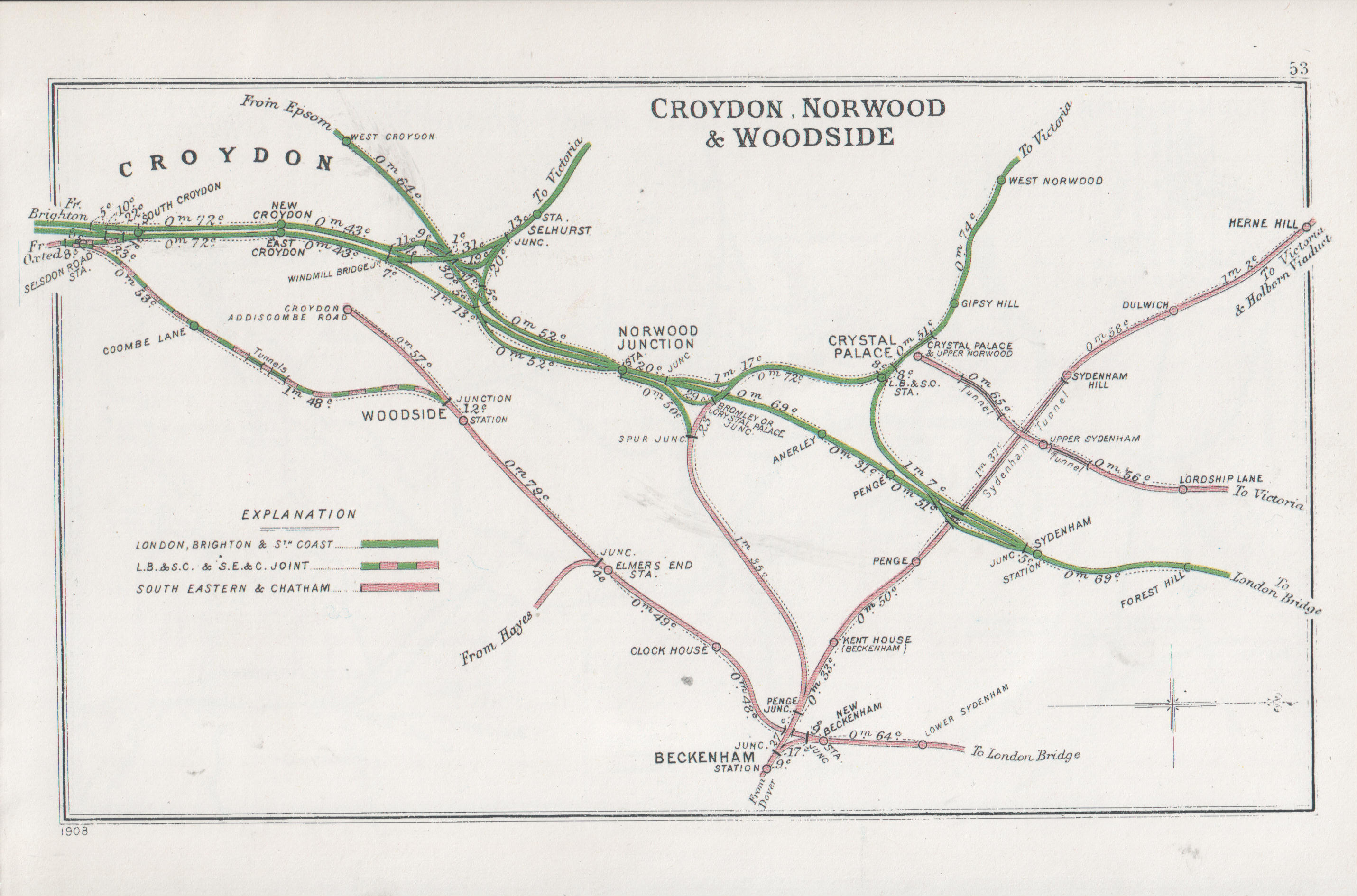
A 1908 Railway Clearing House map of lines around the Gipsy Hill railway station, as well as surrounding lines

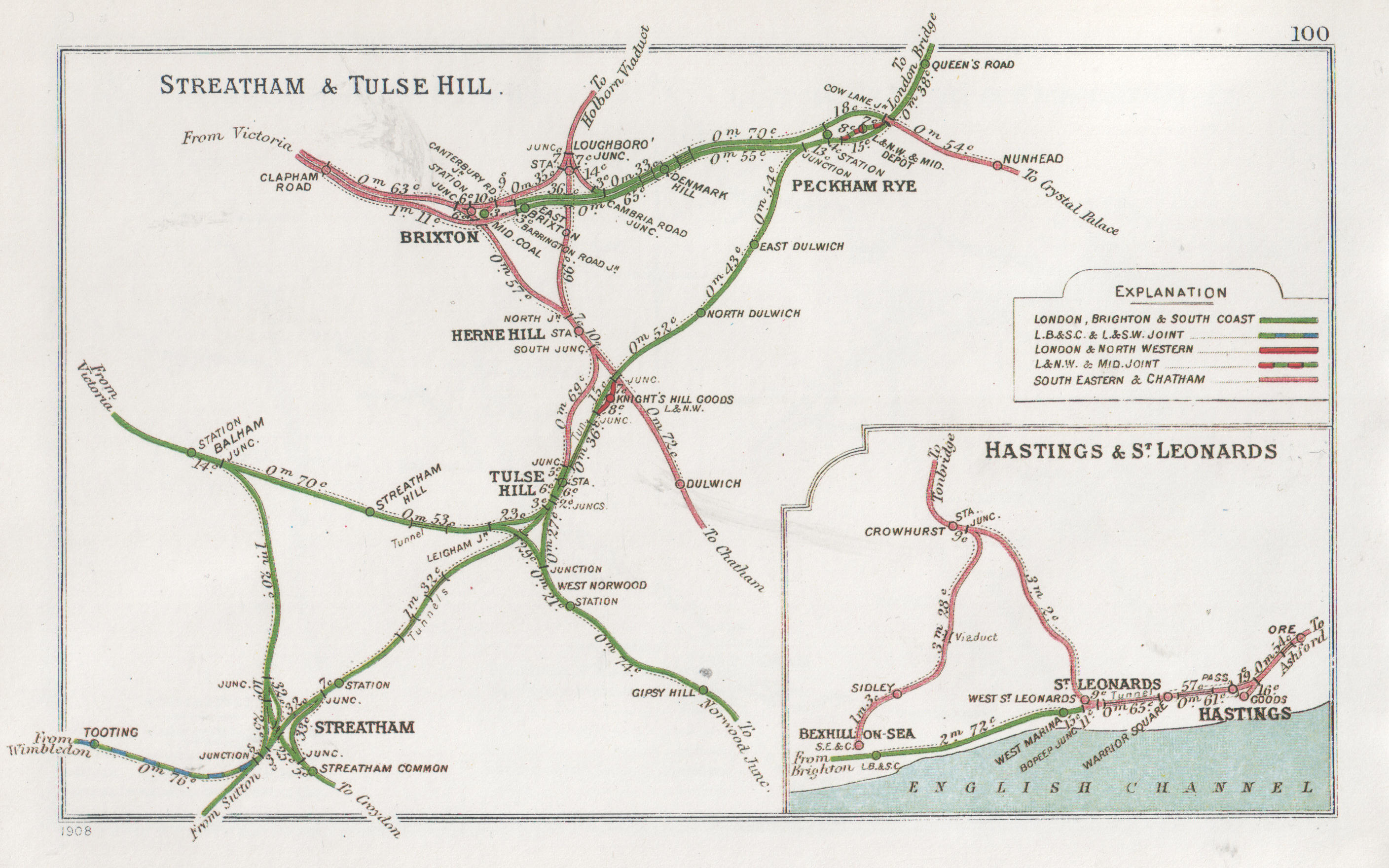
A 1908 Railway Clearing House map of lines around Gipsy Hill railway station.
