= London Buses route 2 =

London bus route

2
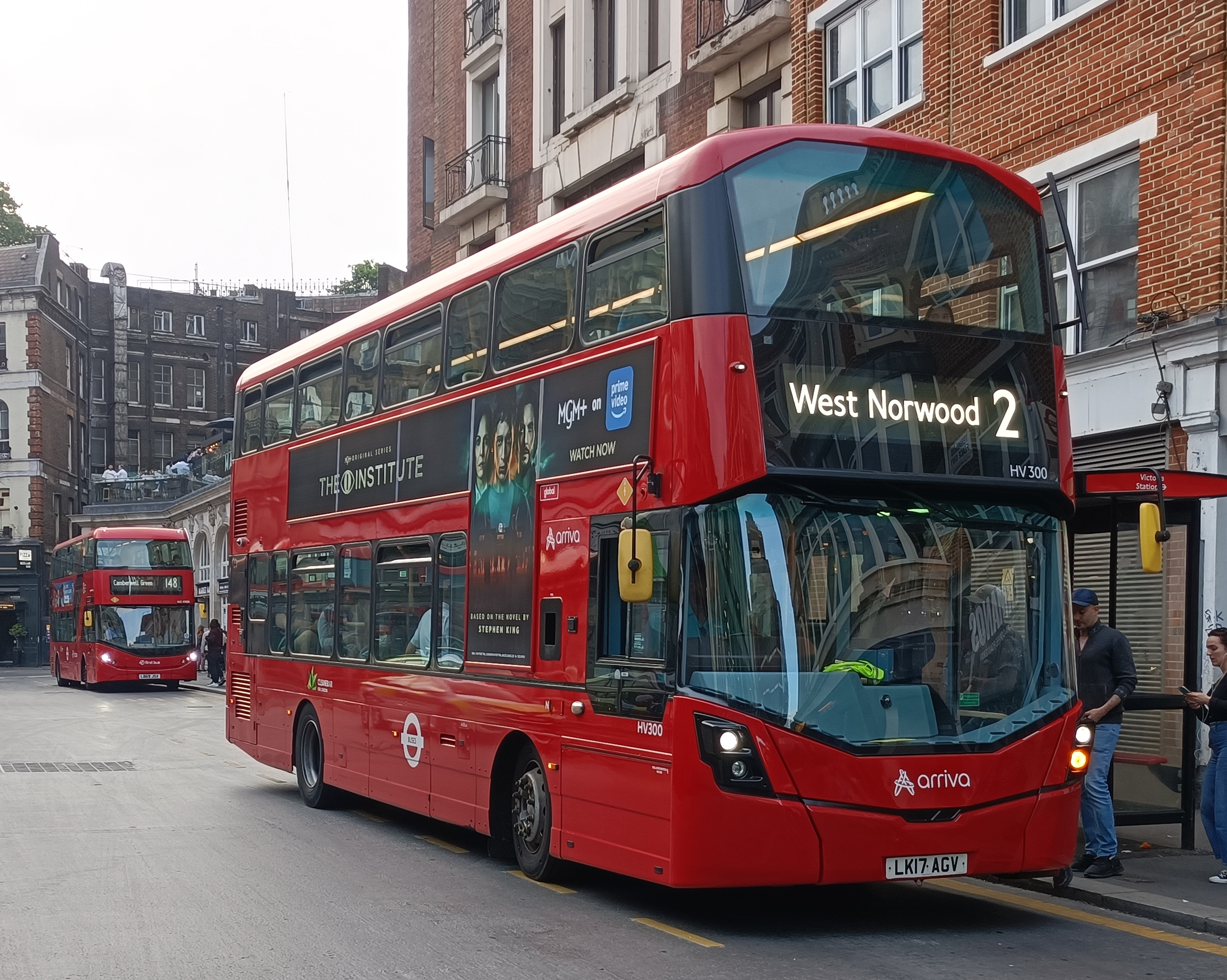
- Arriva London Wright Gemini 3 bodied Volvo B5LH at Victoria station in July 2025

Overview
- Operator: Arriva London
- Garage: Norwood
- Vehicle: Volvo B5LH Wright Gemini 3
- Peak vehicle requirement: 21
- Predecessors: Route 2B
- Night-time: Night Bus N2

Route
- Start: Marylebone station
- Via: Marble Arch; Victoria; Brixton
- End: Norwood bus garage

Service
- Level: Daily
- Frequency: About every 7-12 minutes

London Buses route 2 is a Transport for London contracted bus route in London, England. Running between Marylebone station and Norwood bus garage, it is operated by Arriva London.

== History ==
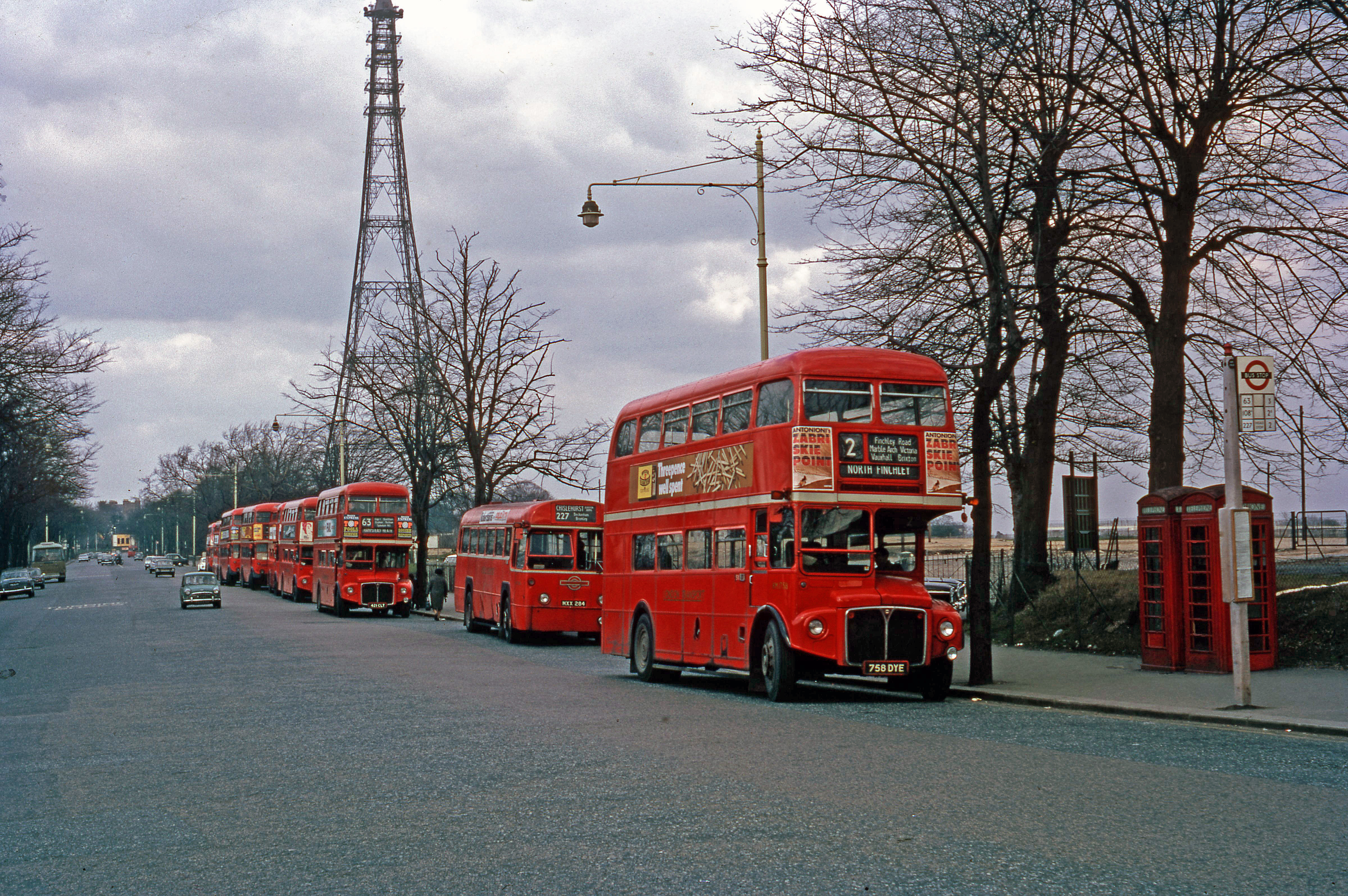
AEC Routemaster in Crystal Palace in April 1971

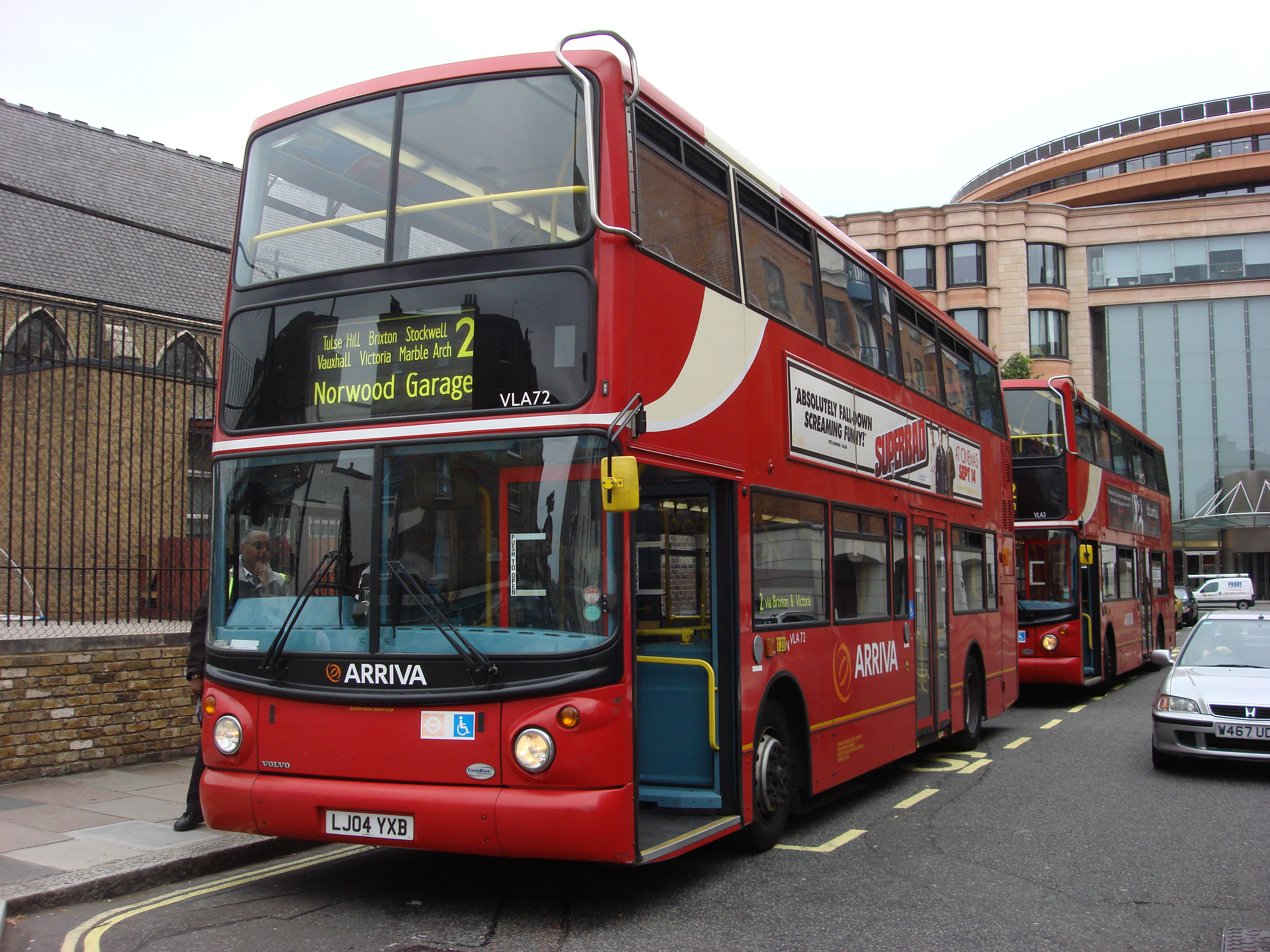
Arriva London Alexander ALX400 bodied Volvo B7TL in September 2007

Route 2 was the last West End bus route that was operated by step-entrance buses other than AEC Routemasters. Ironically, it was also the first London bus route to use the Routemaster.

In the 1950s, the route was run using AEC Regent IIIs. On 8 February 1956, the first prototype AEC Routemaster ran on route 2 between Golders Green and Crystal Palace and after undergoing modifications the following year, it passed to route 260. On 29 January 1994, route 2 was converted to one-man operation with the AEC Routemasters replaced by Leyland Olympians and MCW Metrobuses.

In 2003, brand new Alexander ALX400 Volvo B7TL double-decker buses were introduced. Conversion to the type took place a few months before the contract was renewed.

In 2015, the route received a part allocation of Enviro400s from route 341. Some of its longer 10.6-metre Volvo B7TLs were transferred to Edmonton bus garage for use on route 123.

It is operated out of Norwood bus garage with a peak vehicle requirement of 21 buses.

In 2021, the peak frequency of the service was reduced from eight buses per hour to seven.

== Current route ==
Route 2 operates via these primary locations:

- Marylebone station
- Baker Street station
- Marble Arch
- Hyde Park Corner
- Victoria station
- Pimlico station
- Vauxhall bus station
- Stockwell station
- Brixton station
- Tulse Hill station
- West Norwood station
- Norwood bus garage
