= Streatham Hill railway station =

National Rail station in London, England

Streatham Hill
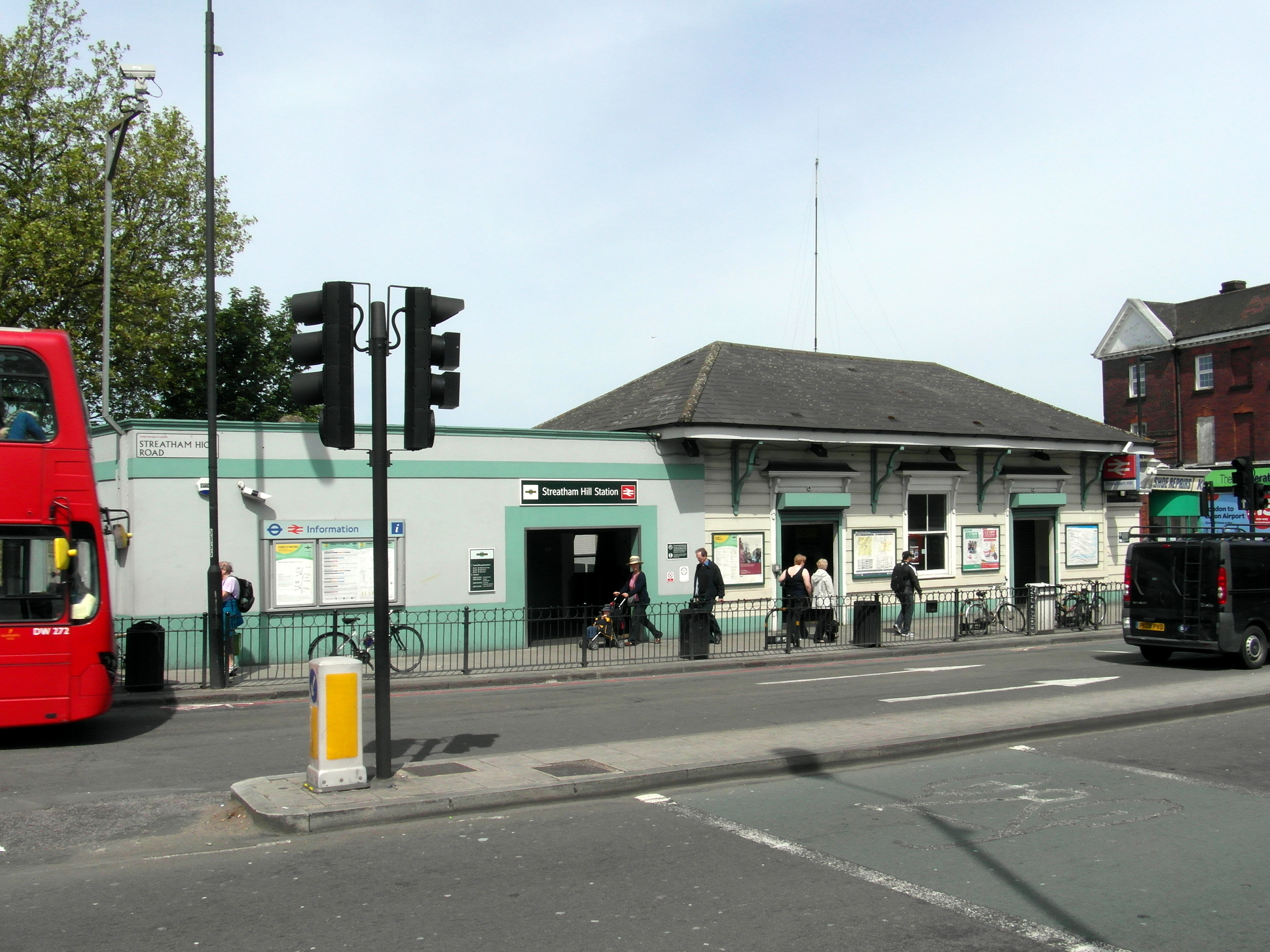
- Interactive map of Streatham Hill

General information
- Location: Streatham
- Local authority: London Borough of Lambeth
- Managed by: Southern
- Station code: SRH
- DfT category: C2
- Number of platforms: 2
- Fare zone: 3

National Rail annual entry and exit
- 2020–21: ▼0.510 million
- 2021–22: ▲0.960 million
- 2022–23: ▲1.183 million
- 2023–24: ▲1.690 million
- 2024–25: ▲1.824 million

Key dates
- 1 December 1856: Opened

Other information
- External links: Departures; Facilities
- Coordinates: 51.438°N 0.1271°W

Streatham Hill railway station is one of three stations serving the district of Streatham, in the London Borough of Lambeth. It is 5 miles 57 chains (9.2 km) measured from London Victoria. The wooden station building at street level faces the busy Streatham High Road (A23) at the junction with Leigham Court Road. Services are operated by Southern.

Access to the platforms – which are in a cutting below street level, and which continue under a bridge beneath the road – is possible via a pair of staircases or lifts. A project to replace the staircases and introduce lift access was completed in 2009. The station is served by Class 377s.

== History ==
The railway station was opened by the West End of London and Crystal Palace Railway on 1 December 1856, originally being named 'Streatham'. Trains were operated from the outset by the London, Brighton and South Coast Railway. It was renamed Streatham & Brixton Hill on 1 September 1868 before receiving its present name on 1 January 1869.

There is a depot for maintenance of the passenger carriages at the London end of the station. Some of the lighting gantries above the sidings are remains of the pioneering "overhead electric" power supply that the LB&SCR introduced on this line on 12 May 1911. This was abandoned in June 1928 when the Southern Railway replaced it with third rail electrification.

== Services ==
All services at Streatham Hill are operated by Southern using Class 377 EMUs.

The typical off-peak service in trains per hour is:

- 4 tph to London Victoria
- 2 tph to London Bridge via Forest Hill
- 2 tph to West Croydon

During the evening, the services between London Victoria and West Croydon do not run.

Preceding station	National Rail	Following station
Balham	Southern Crystal Palace Line	West Norwood

== Connections ==
London Buses routes 45, 50, 57, 109, 133, 159, 201, 250, 255, 319, 333, 417 and P13 and night routes N109, N133 and N137 serve the station.

== See also ==
The other stations in Streatham are:

- Streatham railway station
- Streatham Common railway station
