= West Norwood (disambiguation) =

West Norwood is an area of London, England.

West Norwood may also refer to:

- West Norwood railway station, in West Norwood, London
- West Norwood, New Jersey, an unincorporated community in the borough of Norwood, New Jersey, US
