= Streatham railway station =

Railway station in London, England

Streatham
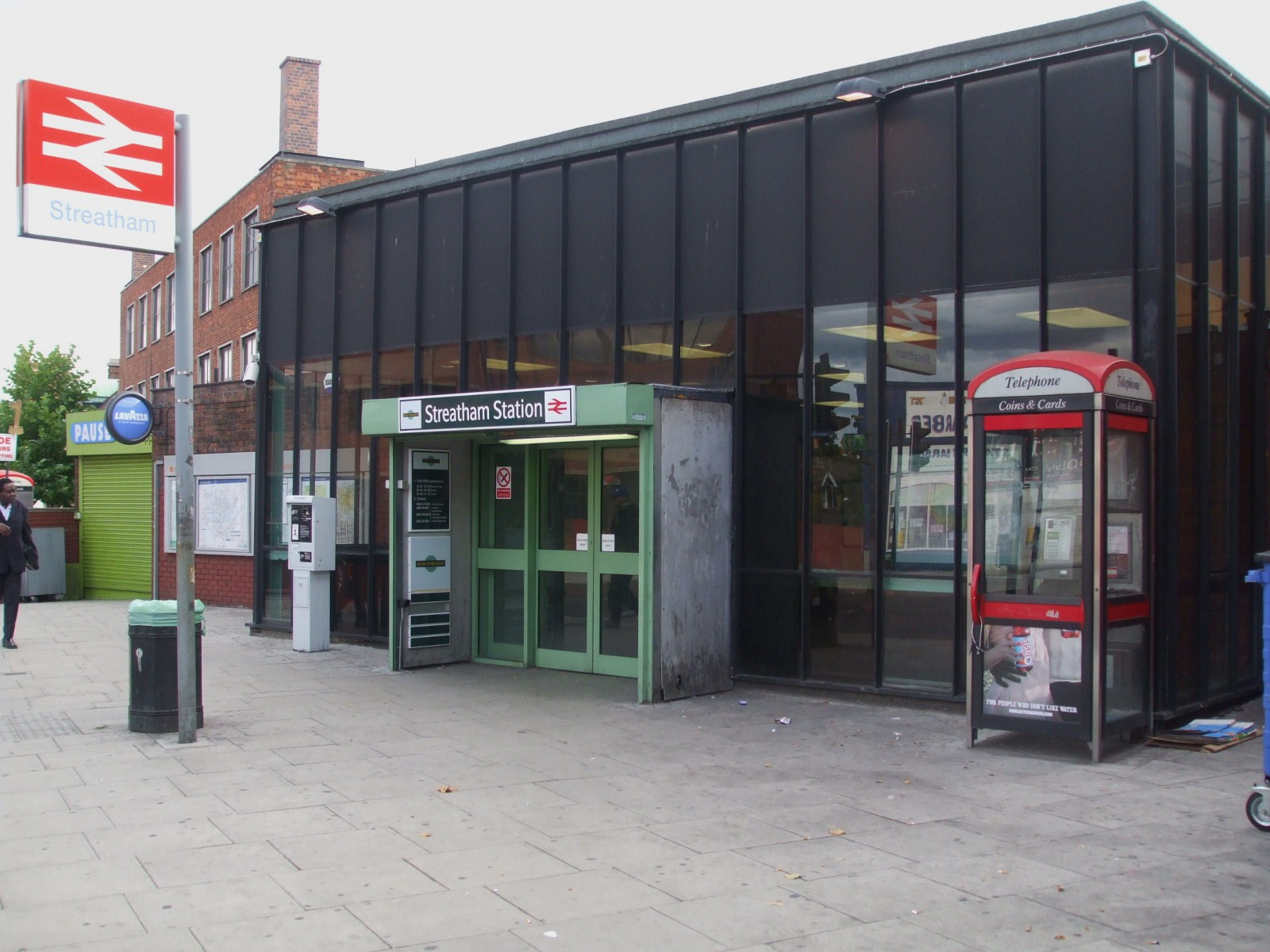
- Interactive map of Streatham

General information
- Location: Streatham
- Local authority: London Borough of Lambeth
- Managed by: Southern
- Station code: STE
- DfT category: D
- Number of platforms: 2
- Fare zone: 3

National Rail annual entry and exit
- 2020–21: ▼0.895 million
- Interchange: ▼0.139 million
- 2021–22: ▲1.688 million
- Interchange: ▲0.252 million
- 2022–23: ▲1.989 million
- Interchange: ▲0.296 million
- 2023–24: ▲2.120 million
- Interchange: ▲0.351 million
- 2024–25: ▲2.438 million
- Interchange: ▼0.298 million

Key dates
- 1 October 1868: Opened

Other information
- External links: Departures; Facilities
- Coordinates: 51.4259639°N 0.1313556°W

Streatham railway station is a National Rail station in central Streatham in south London. Its main entrance now is on Streatham High Road, and is in London fare zone 3.

Services are provided by Southern and Thameslink. Thameslink services go north to St Albans via London Blackfriars and St Pancras, and south to Wimbledon and Sutton. Southern services run between London Bridge and East Croydon.

A news kiosk in the street level ticket hall sells newspapers, coffee and snacks. There is no seating at this level. The platforms are below the station building and accessed by staircases. There has been no step-free disabled access to the northbound platform since the station forecourt on the up (northbound) platform side was redeveloped in the 1980s for the construction of a supermarket. Ticket barriers were installed to the entrance in June 2009. New lifts providing step-free access from the entrance to both platforms have been constructed and were completed in Autumn 2023.

== Services ==
Services at Streatham are operated by Southern and Thameslink using Class 377 and 700 EMUs.

The typical off-peak service in trains per hour is:

- 4 tph to St Albans City via Herne Hill
- 2 tph to London Bridge via Peckham Rye
- 4 tph to Sutton (2 of these run via Mitcham Junction and 2 run via Wimbledon)
- 2 tph to East Croydon via Norbury

A small number of late evening Thameslink services are extended beyond St Albans City to Bedford. On Sundays, there are also direct services beyond St Albans City to Luton.

Preceding station	National Rail	Following station
Tulse Hill	Thameslink Sutton & Mole Valley Lines	Mitcham Eastfields
Tulse Hill	Thameslink Sutton Loop Line	Tooting
Tulse Hill	Southern London to East Croydon	Streatham Common
	Historical railways	
Tulse Hill	Tooting, Merton and Wimbledon Railway	Tooting Junction

== Connections ==
London Buses routes 45, 50, 60, 109, 133, 159, 249, 250, 255, G1, P13 and night routes N109, N133 and N250 serve the station.

== Gallery ==
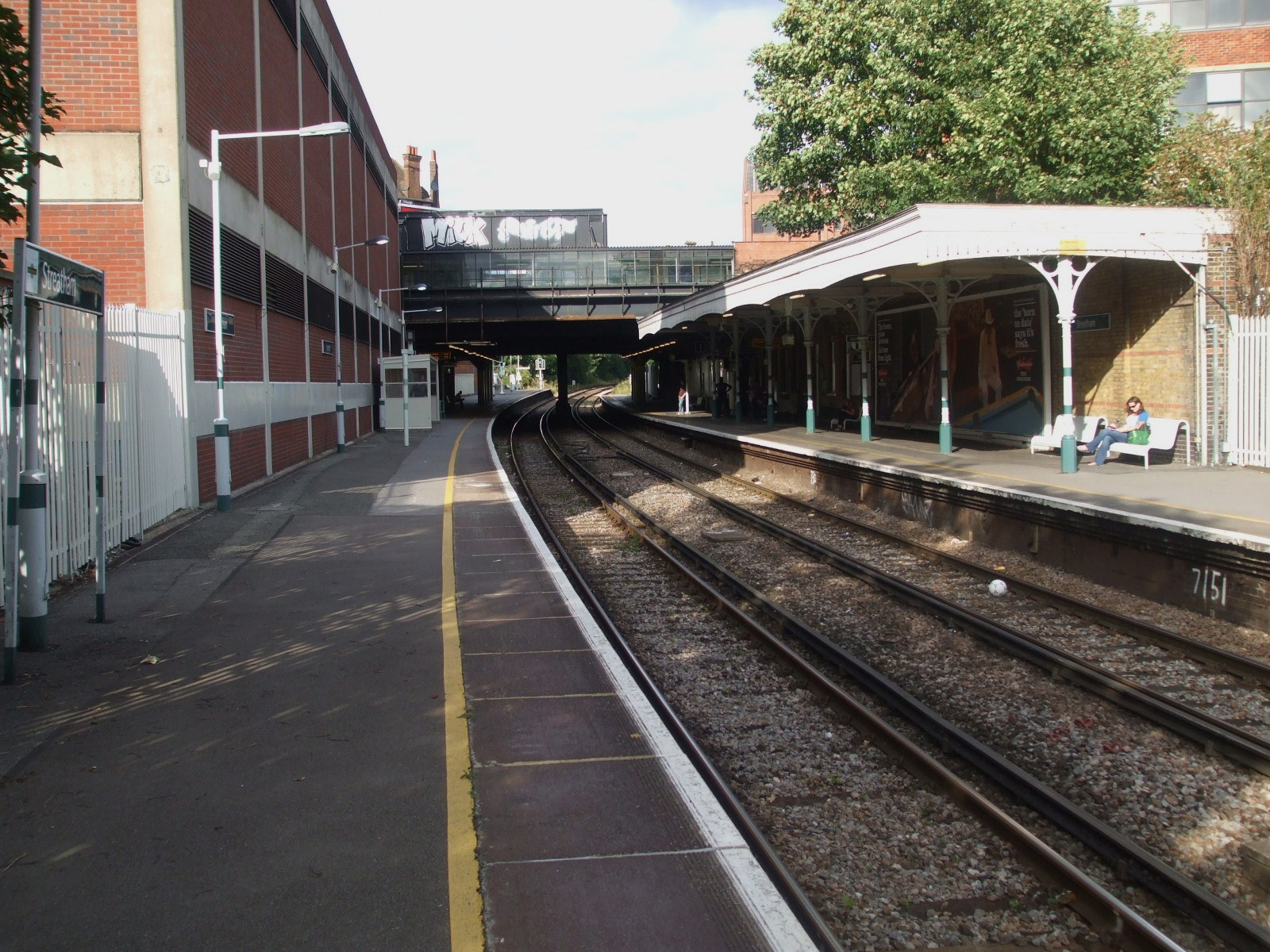
Looking north

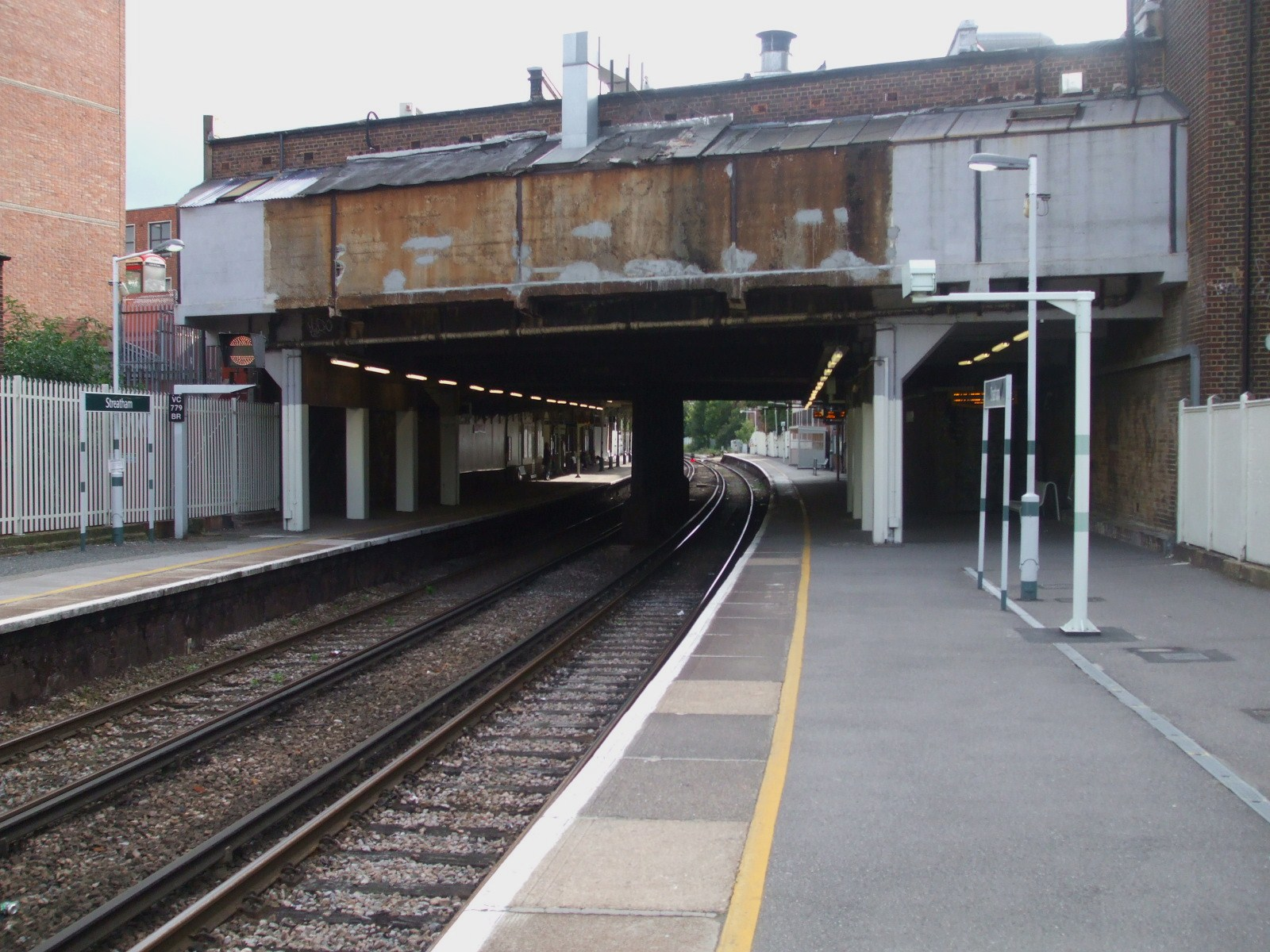
Looking south

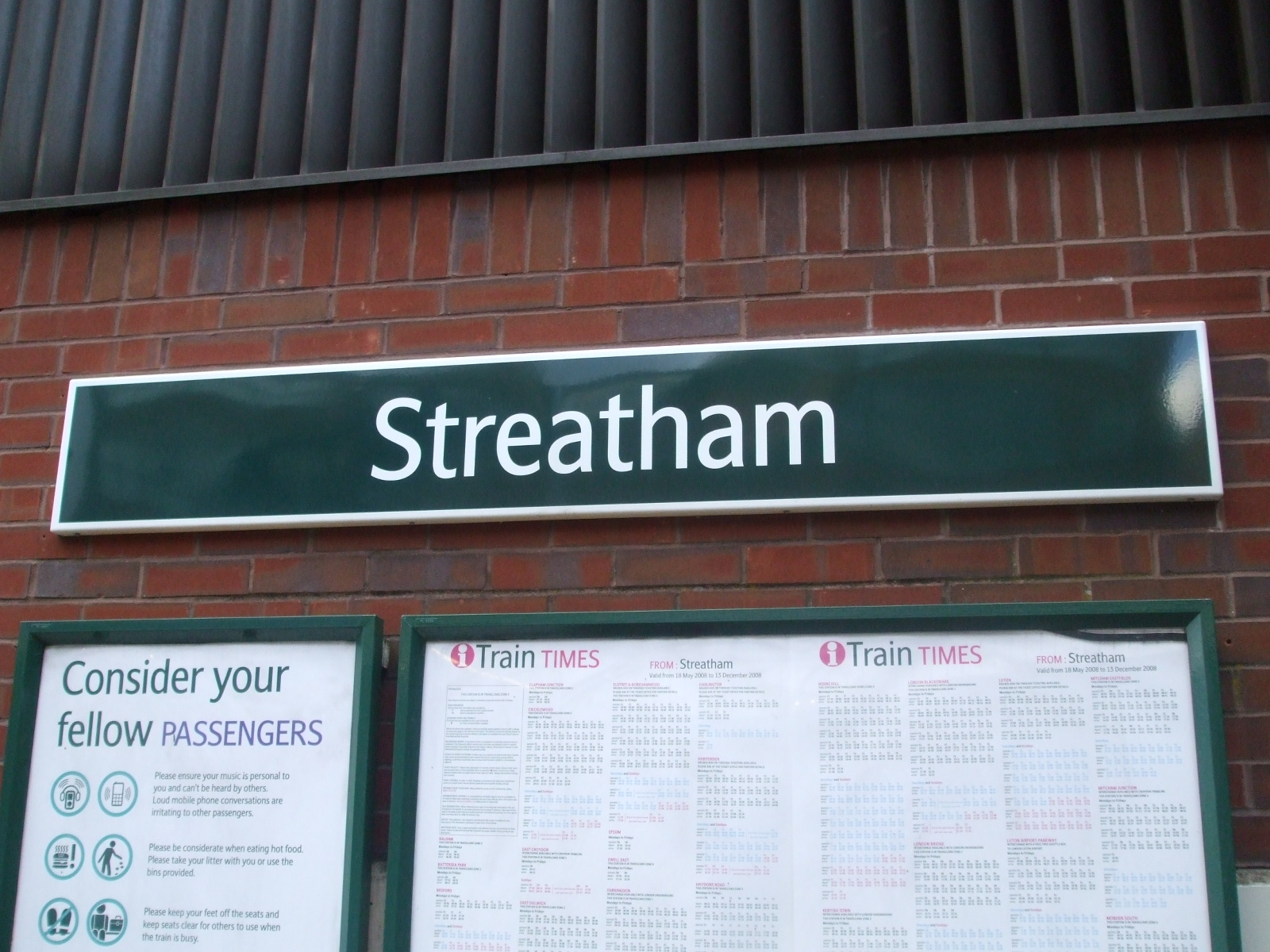
Platform signage

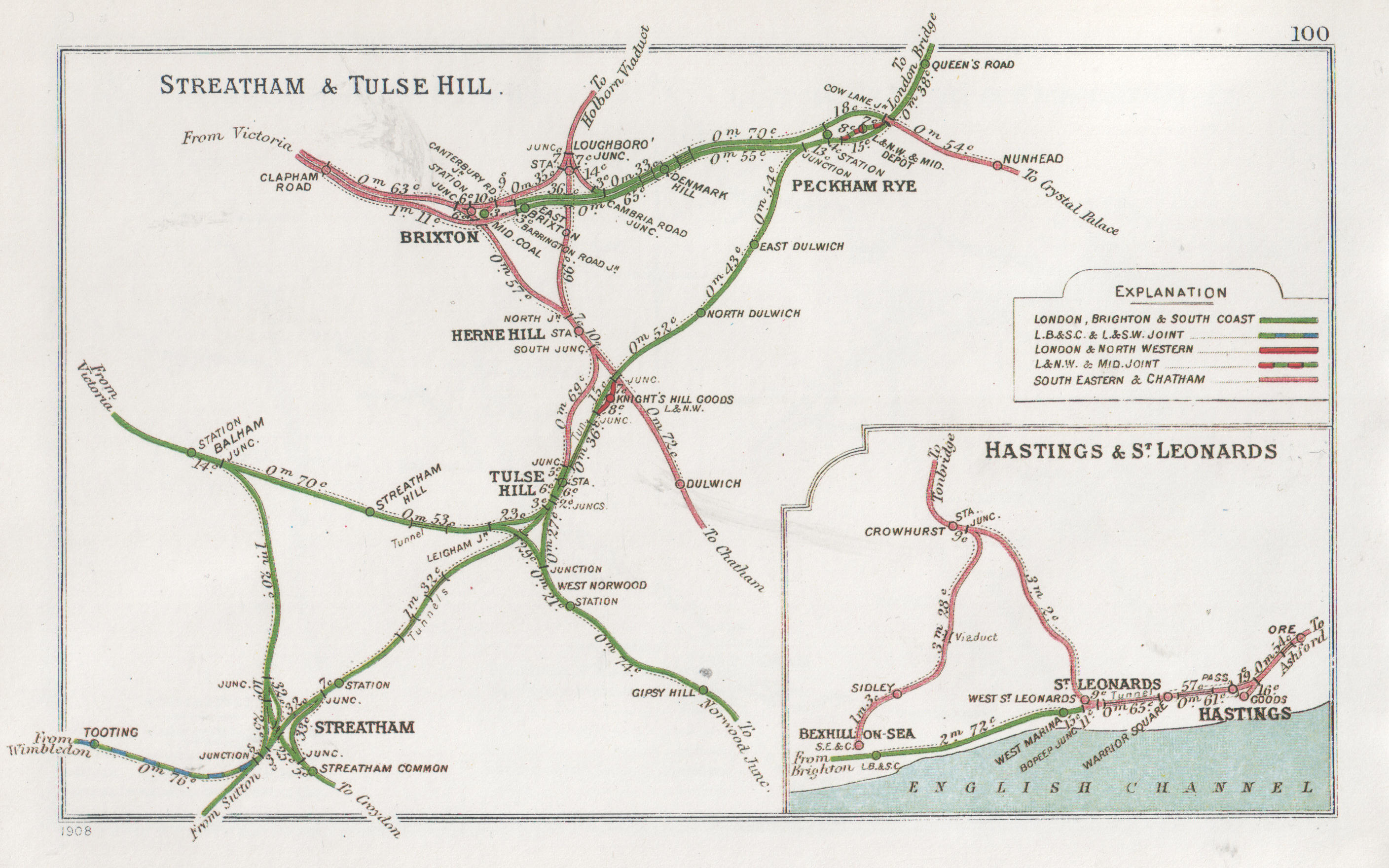
A 1908 Railway Clearing House map of lines around Streatham station.

== See also ==
The other stations in Streatham are:

- Streatham Hill railway station
- Streatham Common railway station
