= London Buses route 109 =

London bus route

109
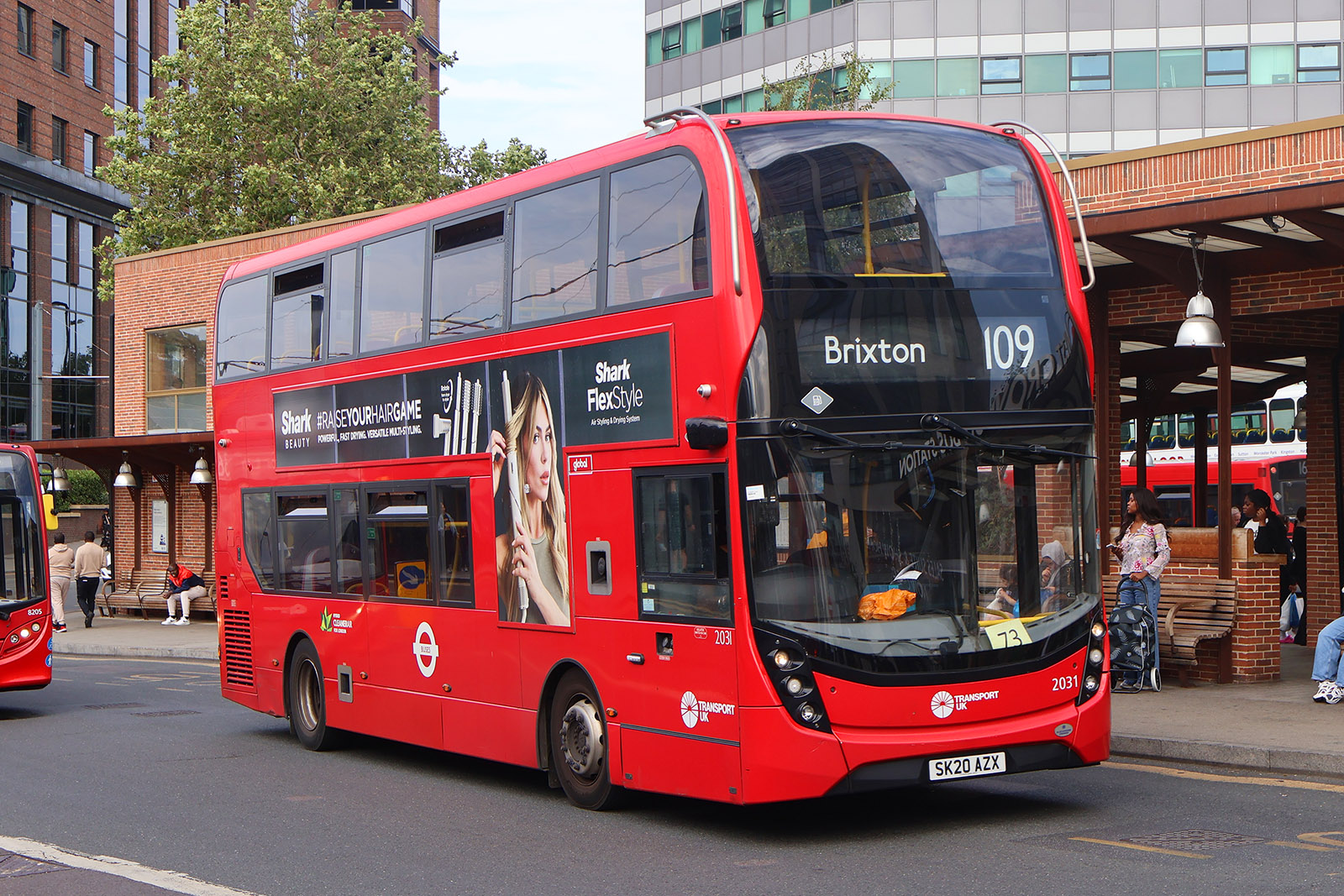
- Transport UK London Bus Alexander Dennis Enviro400 MMC at West Croydon bus station in August 2024

Overview
- Operator: Transport UK London Bus
- Garage: Beddington
- Vehicle: Alexander Dennis Enviro400H MMC
- Peak vehicle requirement: 26
- Night-time: N109

Route
- Start: Croydon town centre
- Via: Thornton Heath Pond; Norbury; Streatham
- End: Brixton station
- Length: 7 miles (11 km)

Service
- Level: Daily
- Frequency: About every 6-10 minutes
- Journey time: 32-66 minutes
- Operates: 05:30 until 01:00

London Buses route 109 is a Transport for London contracted bus route in London, England. Running between Croydon town centre and Brixton station, it is operated by Transport UK London Bus.

== History ==
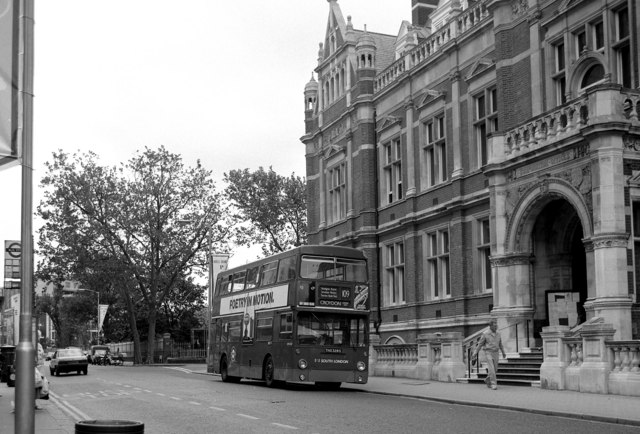
Daimler Fleetline in Croydon

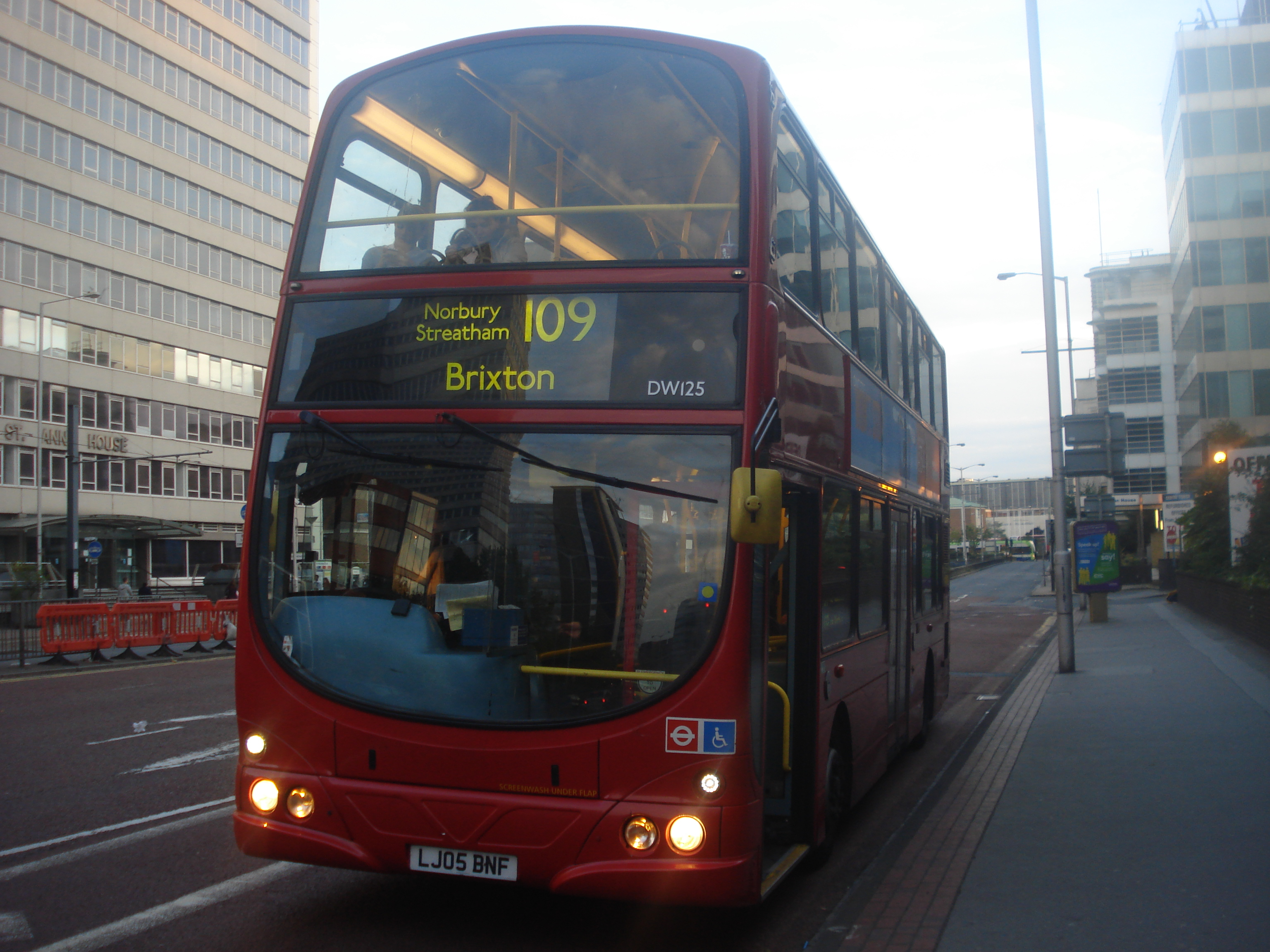
Arriva London Wright Eclipse bodied DAF DB250 in September 2013

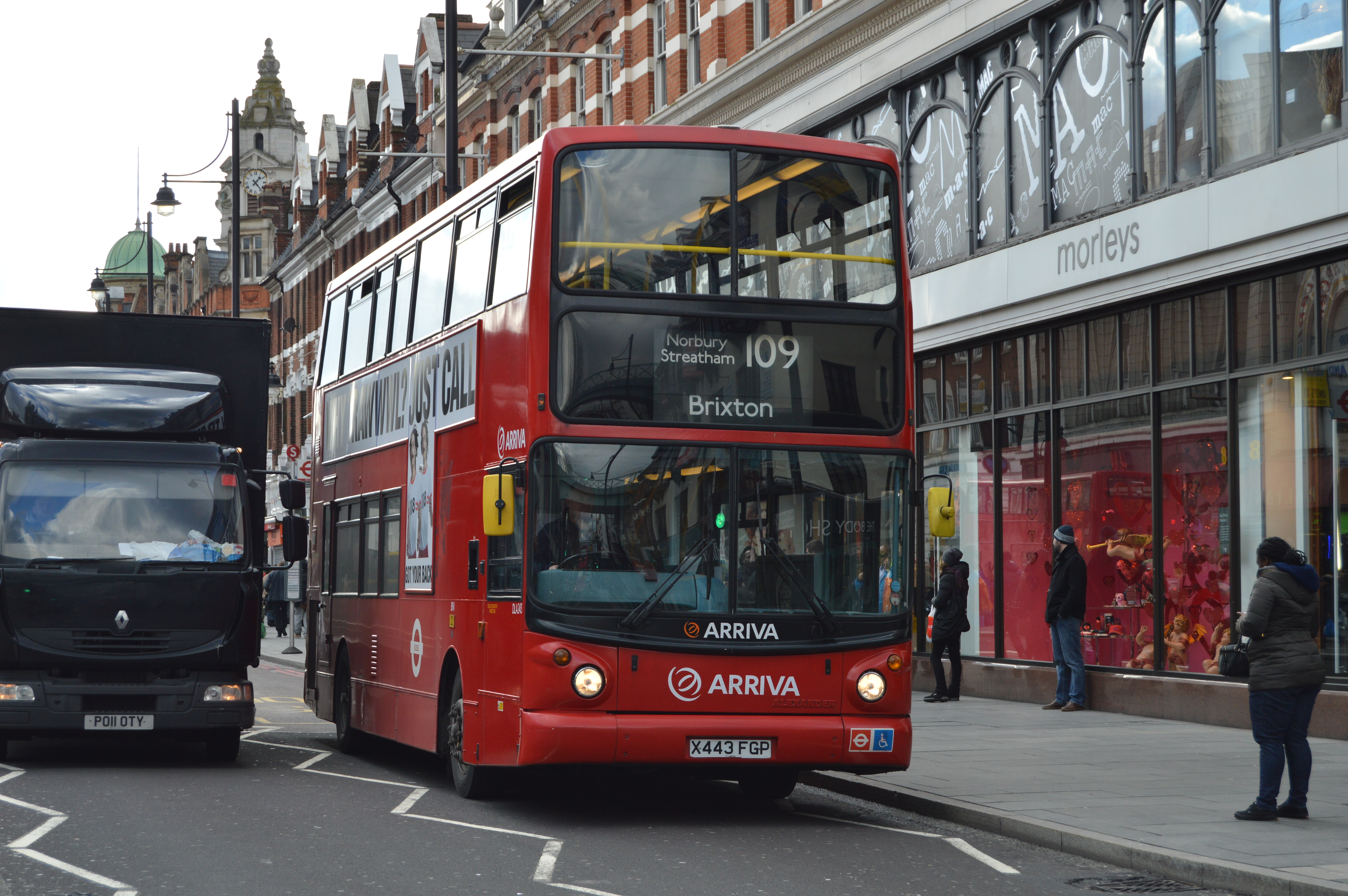
Arriva London Alexander ALX400 bodied DAF DB250LF in Brixton in February 2014

Route 109 commenced operating on 8 April 1951 as a circular Purley - West Croydon station - Streatham - Elephant & Castle - Victoria Embankment - Westminster - Kennington - Norbury - Croydon - Purley route operating in both directions. It replaced tram routes 16 and 18, operating from Brixton and Thornton Heath garages with AEC Regent III RTs.

From 16 October 1957 it ran between Purley High Street and Victoria Embankment. On 23 January 1966, the Sunday service was withdrawn with the exception of a few early morning journeys operated by Thornton Heath garage. On 31 October 1970, these journeys were converted to one-man operation (OMO) using single-deck AEC Swifts, with subsequent conversion to double-deck Daimler Fleetline operation from 23 March 1974.

On 3 February 2001, it was converted to low floor operation with Alexander ALX400 bodied DAF DB250s. Upon being re-tendered, Arriva London successfully retained with new contracts commencing on 1 February 2003 and 30 January 2010. On 31 March 2012, route 109 was transferred from Thornton Heath to Brixton garage.

Upon being re-tendered, route 109 was awarded to Abellio London's Beddington garage from 31 January 2015.

== Current route ==
Route 109 operates via these primary locations:

- Croydon town centre
- West Croydon bus station
- Croydon University Hospital
- Thornton Heath Pond
- Norbury station
- Streatham station
- Streatham Hill station
- Brixton tube station
