= Streatham Common railway station =

Railway station in London, England

Streatham Common
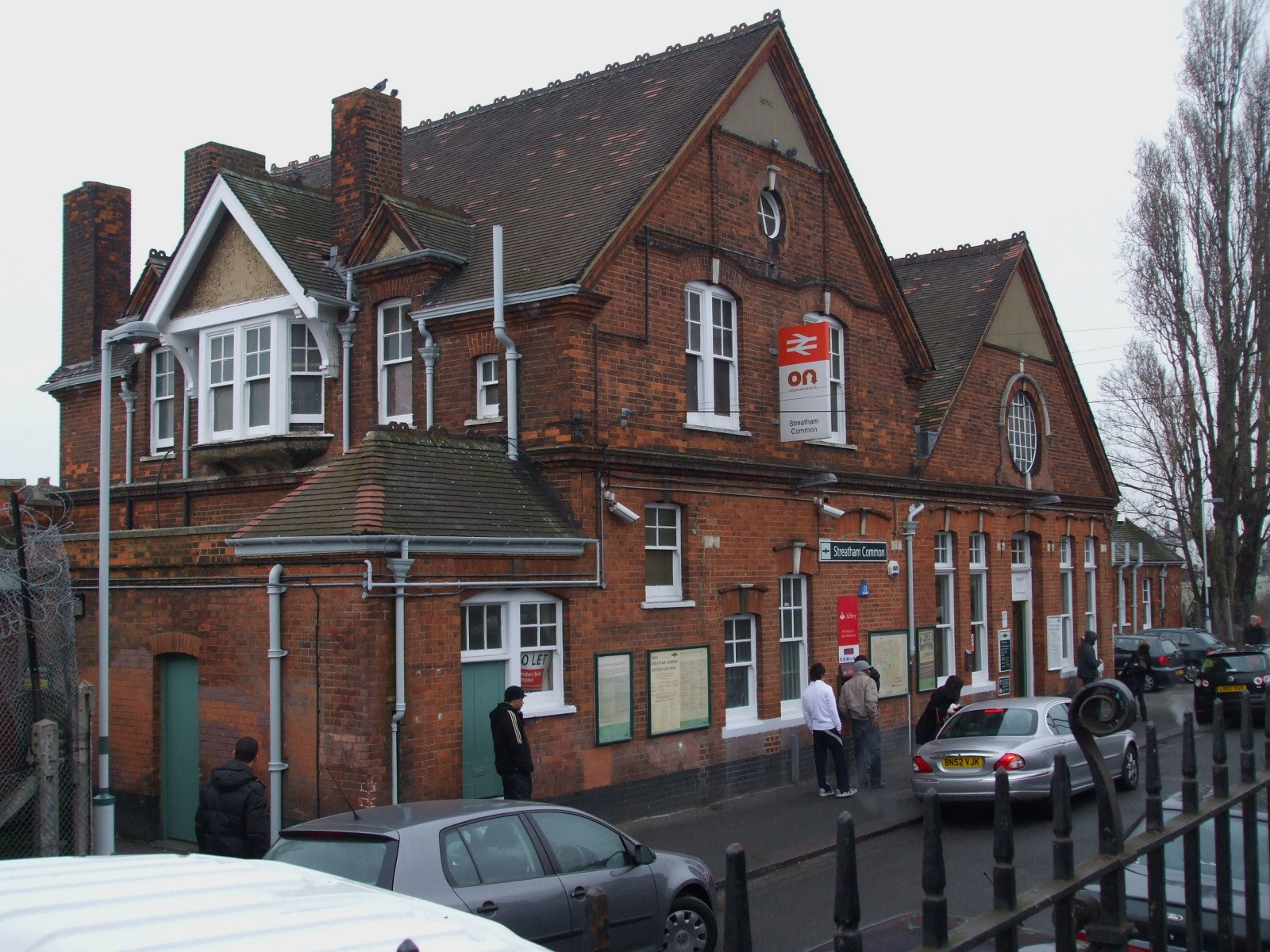
- Interactive map of Streatham Common

General information
- Location: Streatham Common
- Local authority: London Borough of Lambeth
- Managed by: Southern
- Station code: SRC
- DfT category: C2
- Number of platforms: 4
- Accessible: Yes
- Fare zone: 3

National Rail annual entry and exit
- 2020–21: ▼1.186 million
- Interchange: ▼58,368
- 2021–22: ▲2.081 million
- Interchange: ▲0.116 million
- 2022–23: ▲2.269 million
- Interchange: ▼83,725
- 2023–24: ▲2.529 million
- Interchange: ▼80,874
- 2024–25: ▲2.765 million
- Interchange: ▲91,029

Key dates
- 1 December 1862: Opened

Other information
- External links: Departures; Facilities
- Coordinates: 51.4187°N 0.1362°W

Streatham Common railway station is in Streatham in south London, 6 miles 48 chains (10.6 km) from London Victoria, and in London fare zone 3.

The station is managed by Southern who also operate trains from the station. Direct trains from the station run to Victoria, London Bridge, East Croydon, Shepherd's Bush, and Watford Junction.

The station has four platforms, but only platforms 1 and 2 are in daily use; platforms 3 and 4 are normally for passing express trains, but they are occasionally used during engineering work or major disruption. Step-free access to both platforms and both station entrances is available.

Although the station is named Streatham Common, it is actually 0.5 miles (0.80 km) away from Streatham Common, and Streatham railway station is the nearest station, being 0.3 miles (0.48 km) from the common.

== History ==
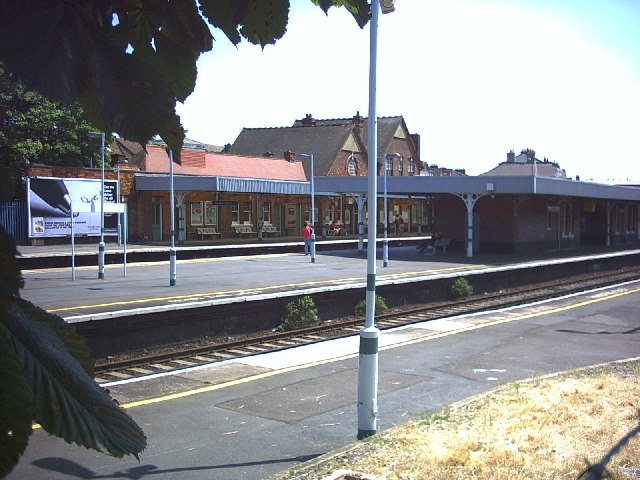
The station platforms

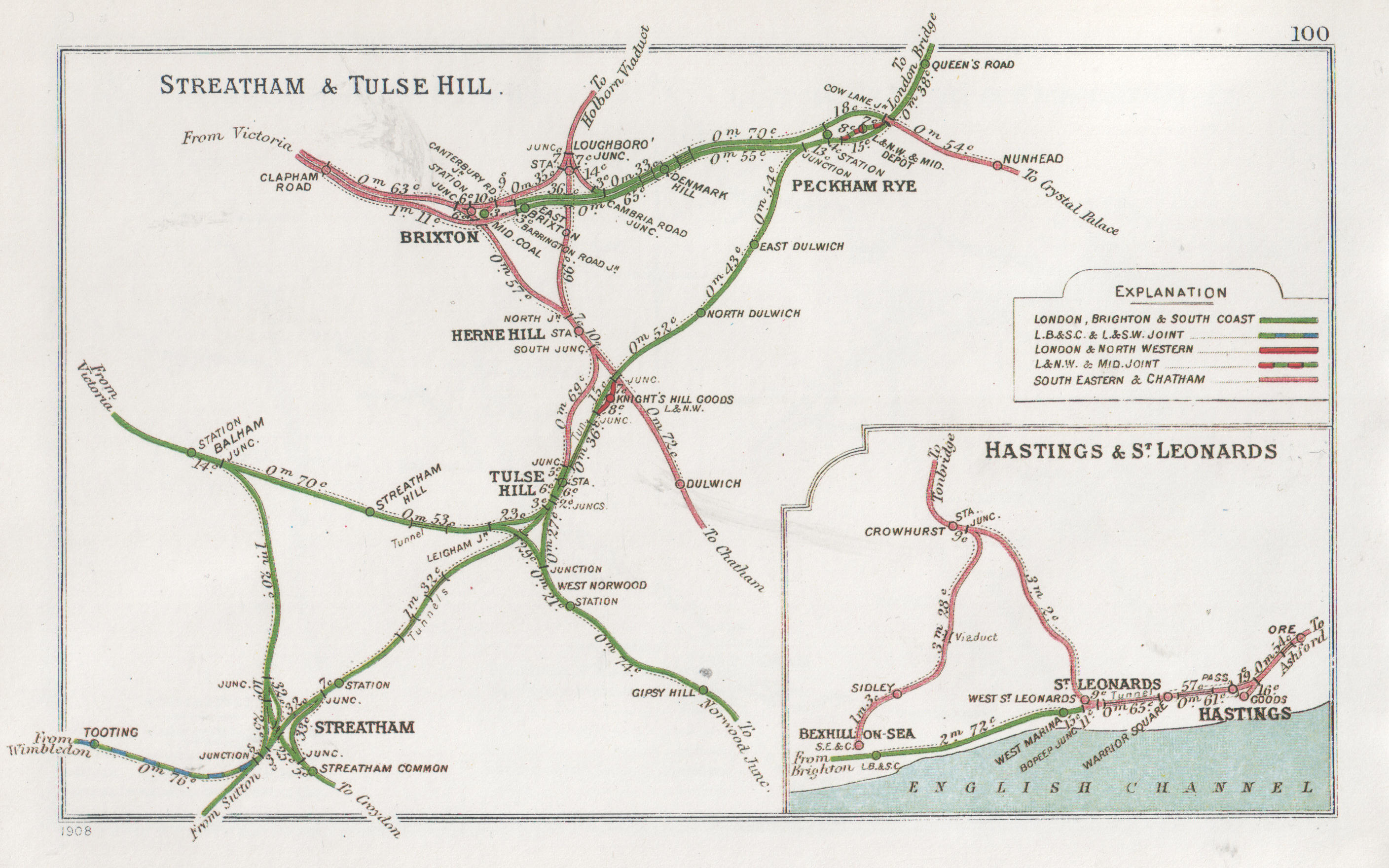
A 1908 Railway Clearing House map of lines around Streatham Common railway station.

The Balham Hill and East Croydon line was constructed by the London Brighton and South Coast Railway (LB&SCR) as a short-cut on the Brighton Main Line to London Victoria, avoiding Crystal Palace and Norwood Junction.

=== Opening and renaming ===
The station was opened on 1 December 1862, and named Greyhound Lane station. All reports of an 1863 accident in The Times newspaper, however, refer to it occurring near "Streatham-common station", and it has been officially known by the latter name since 1870.

=== Fatal accident ===
On 29 May 1863 the 5pm Brighton express train derailed near the station. The train was carrying two companies of the 2nd Battalion Grenadier Guards, 150 men in all, returning from the rifle range at Eastbourne along with other civilian passengers.

As the train entered the curved track leading into the station complex, it derailed, causing the carriages to catapult over the locomotive and its boiler to explode with such force that the driver and fireman were thrown into a nearby field. The locomotive and carriages came to rest at the bottom of the embankment adjacent to the track.

Three people, Eliza Chilver, Private Charles Stone, and Private George Blundin were killed on impact. A fourth, John Salmon the engine driver, subsequently died of his injuries. In total 59 people were injured, 36 of whom were Guardsmen. Many of those hurt suffered life-changing injuries, including amputations, and third-degree burns.

As the accident involved a troop train it received considerable press coverage. The British Newspaper Archive lists 260 articles on the subject, but many of these are syndicated versions of articles produced by the London newspapers. The Times (London) noted in its 4 July 1863 edition that "Had it been Sydney Smith's famous bishop who had been maimed in this sad accident, greater interest could hardly have been excited in the minds of the public." In all, eight articles appeared in The Times newspaper between 30 May and 2 July 1863.

Queen Victoria sent a telegram of condolence to the Grenadier Guards, and the Prince of Wales regularly sent messengers to the hospitals caring for the wounded, enquiring about their condition.

An inquest began in June 1863 at the Pied Bull public house on Streatham High Road, which concluded on 1 July 1863. The inquest jury returned the following verdict: "The deceased persons severally came by their deaths from accident, and we, the jury, are of the opinion that it was attributable to the high speed at which the express trains run over the line from Croydon to Victoria. The jury would urge the directors of the London and Brighton company the necessity of allowing more time for the performance of the journey, and that careful attention should be given to the coupling of the trains."

=== Station buildings ===
The handsome station building was rebuilt by the London Brighton and South Coast Railway in 1903, when the lines were quadrupled. In 1912 the lines were electrified. It is now an attractive Edwardian vernacular arts and crafts style with prominent gables, clay tiles and long canopies. The station was taken over by the Southern Railway at the Grouping in 1923, becoming part of British Railways' Southern region upon nationalisation of the railways in 1948. The station was hit by at least two bombs dropped by the Zeppelin L31 on 23 September 1916. Damage caused by these bombs was still visible on the Eardley Road side of the station in the 1970s.

=== Rebuilding of the Streatham Vale entrance ===
The station's second entrance on the road bridge serving Streatham Vale which had been closed and abandoned for decades, was rebuilt and reopened as a result of a 20-year campaign led by Streatham Vale Property Occupiers Association members Charlie Ruff and Alan Bedford. The entrance was officially opened by Transport Minister Tom Harris MP, Streatham MP Keith Hill, and the Mayor of Lambeth on 14 May 2007.

=== Ticket barriers ===
Ticket barriers were installed May 2009 to both entrances to curb fraudulent travel and improve security at the station.

=== Step-free access ===
Lifts enabling step free access to platforms 1 and 2, along with a DDA compliant ramp on platform 4 were installed in July and August 2009.

=== Bridge demolition and platform extension ===
Beginning in October 2012 and ending on 10 May 2013 Greyhound Lane and Streatham Vale were closed to enable the extension of platforms 1 and 2 of the station to accommodate 10-car trains, this required the complete demolition and replacement of the Northern section of the station's road bridge. The closure caused severe disruption for local businesses and residents, leading directly to 15 job losses. A campaign led by a local businessman produced hardship payments for 44 businesses, the foundation of the Streatham Bridge Business Association, and the acceleration of the works programme resulting in the early reinstatement of the bridge.

=== Metroisation ===
TfL's 'Strategic Case for Metroisation in south and south east London' (March 2019) proposes to "create a more reliable, better connected and larger public transport network across south London, Surrey and Kent", including - "a new interchange at Streatham Common that allows customers to swap easily between frequent services to Victoria, West London, Blackfriars and London Bridge" (page 67). This would be by means of "New high-level platforms at Streatham Common, for services between Tooting/Mitcham and Streatham" (page 68). If implemented, "stations, including Catford, Streatham Hill and some stations in North Kent will upgrade to metro-level frequencies of 6-8tph during the peak."(page 72). More specifically, the high-level platforms at Streatham Common "would allow the infrequent London Bridge-Selhurst service to be diverted to Sutton, resulting in a new frequent London Bridge-Peckham-Sutton service alongside an increase in frequency between Selhurst and Victoria and Selhurst and West London. The new interchange would allow people to continue to make journeys between the Selhurst line and London Bridge and Blackfriars with an interchange, but at frequencies of every 5 minutes rather than every half hour. It would also enable new or improved connectivity for journeys such as Tooting to Croydon (every 15 minutes) or Balham to Peckham (every 7-8 minutes)." (page 76). Furthermore, "Digital signalling between Victoria and Streatham Common would deliver an additional 4tph between Balham and Victoria" (page 85).

== Services ==
All services at Streatham Common are operated by Southern using Class 377 EMUs.

The typical off-peak service in trains per hour is:

- 2 tph to London Bridge via Tulse Hill
- 2 tph to London Victoria
- 1 tph to Watford Junction via Kensington (Olympia)
- 3 tph to East Croydon
- 2 tph to Epsom Downs

During the peak hours, the station is served by an additional half-hourly service between London Victoria and Sutton.

Preceding station	National Rail	Following station
Streatham	Southern London to East Croydon	Norbury
Balham	Southern Brighton Main Line Stopping Services	Norbury
Balham	Southern West London Line	Norbury

== Connections ==
London Buses routes 45 and 60, and night route N133 serve the station.
