= London Buses route 133 =

London bus route

133
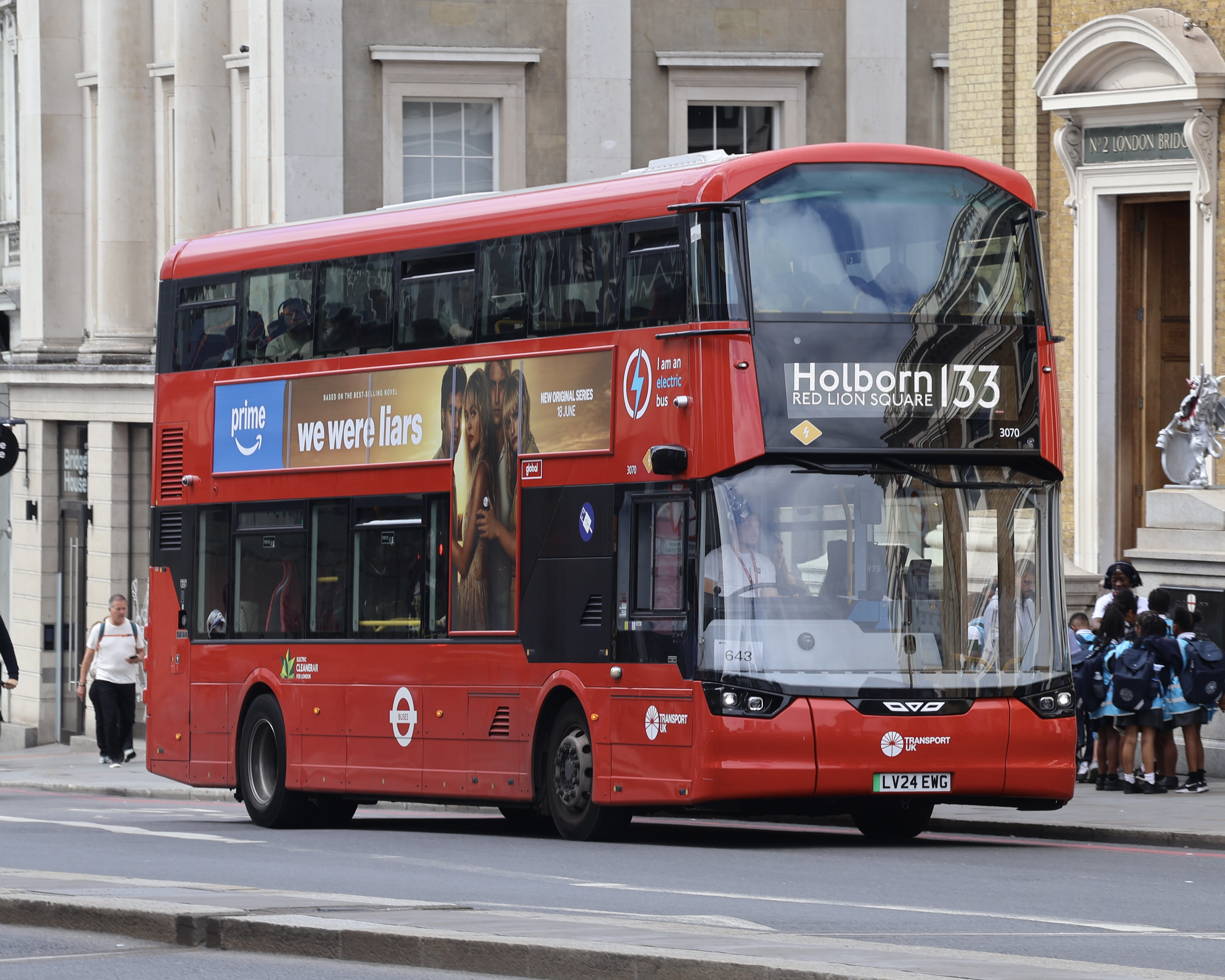
- Transport UK London Bus Wright StreetDeck Electroliner on London Bridge in June 2025

Overview
- Operator: Transport UK London Bus
- Garage: Battersea
- Vehicle: Wright StreetDeck Electroliner
- Peak vehicle requirement: 25
- Began service: 27 March 1929
- Predecessors: Route 34
- Former operators: Arriva London; Go-Ahead London
- Night-time: N133

Route
- Start: Streatham station
- Via: Brixton; Kennington; Elephant and Castle; Borough Market; London Bridge; Holborn Viaduct
- End: Red Lion Square
- Length: 8 miles (13 km)

Service
- Level: Daily
- Frequency: About every 7-12 minutes
- Journey time: 37-78 minutes
- Operates: 04:12 until 23:57

London Buses route 133 is a Transport for London contracted bus route in London, England. Running between Streatham station and Red Lion Square, it is operated by Transport UK London Bus.

== History ==
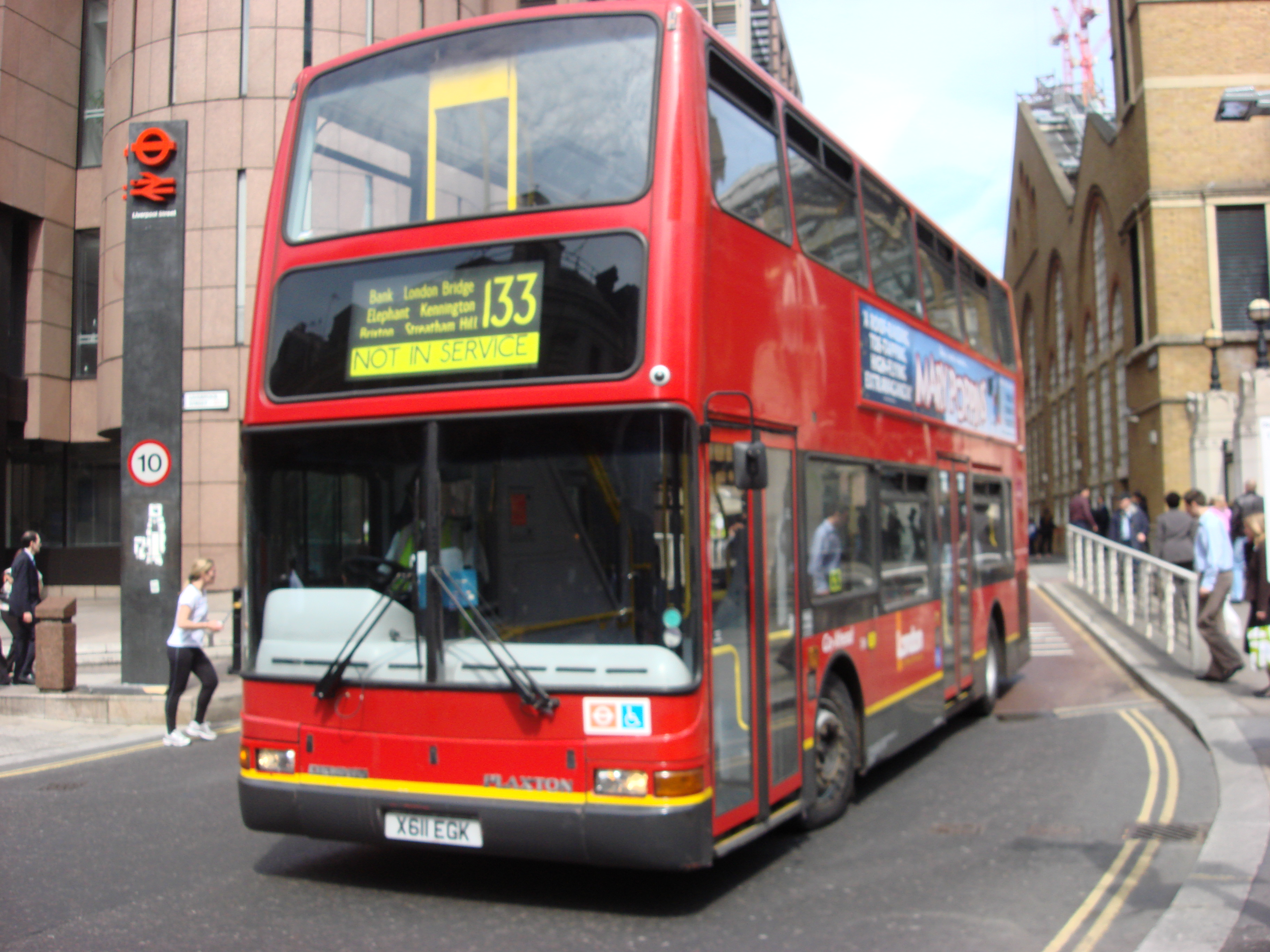
London General Plaxton President bodied Dennis Trident 2 at Liverpool Street bus station in April 2007

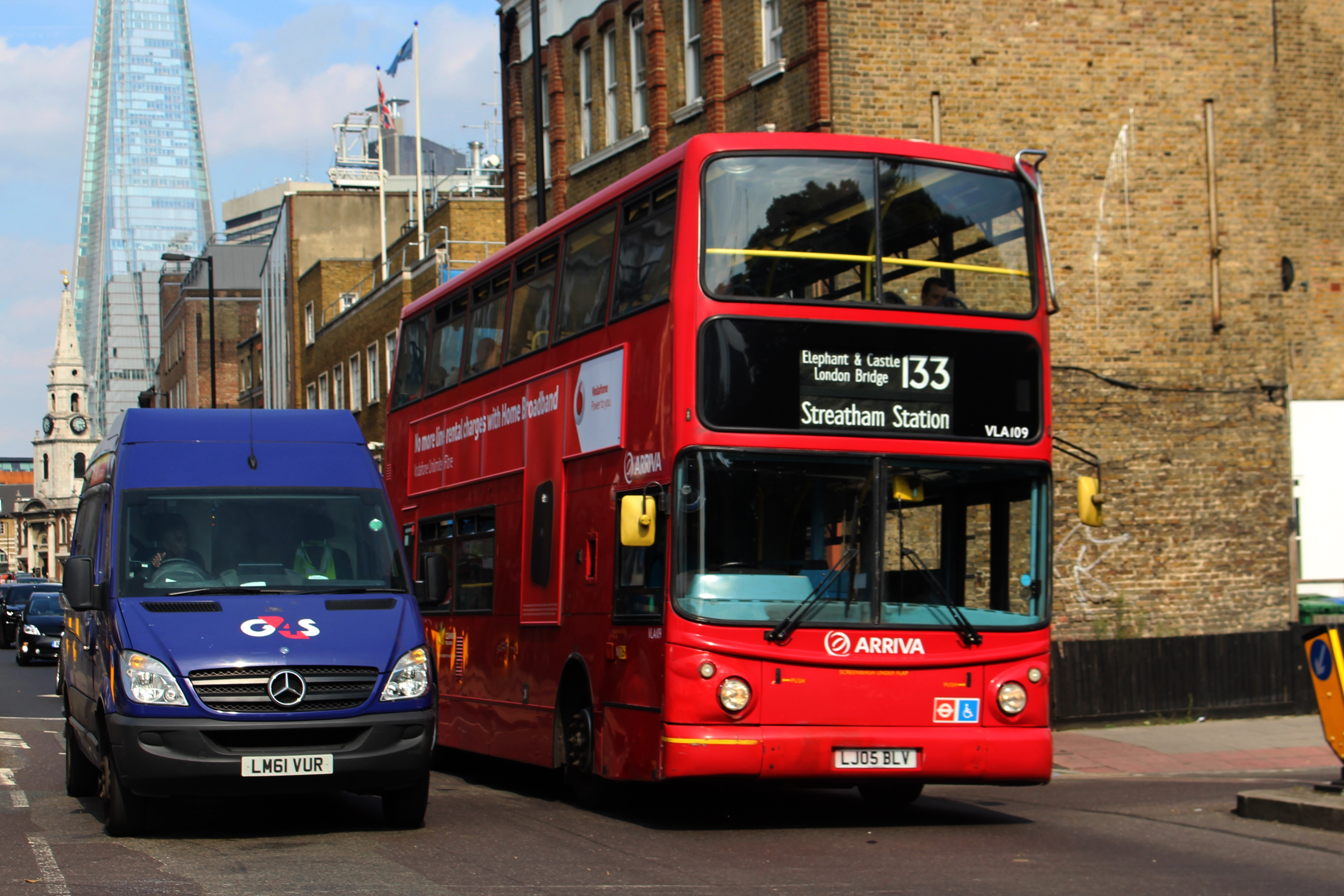
Arriva London Alexander ALX400 bodied Volvo B7TL in August 2016

Route 133 commenced operating on 27 March 1929 from South Croydon to Liverpool Street station. On 24 July 1971, the route was withdrawn between Croydon and Streatham with one man operation introduced with Daimler Fleetlines.

Upon being put out to tender, it was taken over by London General's Stockwell garage on 6 January 1990 with Northern Counties bodied Volvo Citybuses. Upon being re-tendered, route 133 was taken over by Arriva London's Norwood garage on 22 January 2010. When next tendered, it was retained by Arriva London, with it transferred to Brixton garage on 21 January 2017.

On 23 November 2022, it was announced that route 133 would be rerouted to run to Holborn instead of Liverpool Street following a consultation. This change was implemented on 29 April 2023.

== Current route ==
Route 133 operates via these primary locations:

- Streatham station
- Streatham Hill station
- Brixton station
- Kennington station
- Elephant & Castle station
- Borough station
- London Bridge station
- Bank and Monument stations
- St Paul's station
- City Thameslink station
- Holborn Circus
- Chancery Lane station
- Holborn Red Lion Square
