= London Buses route 159 =

London bus route

159
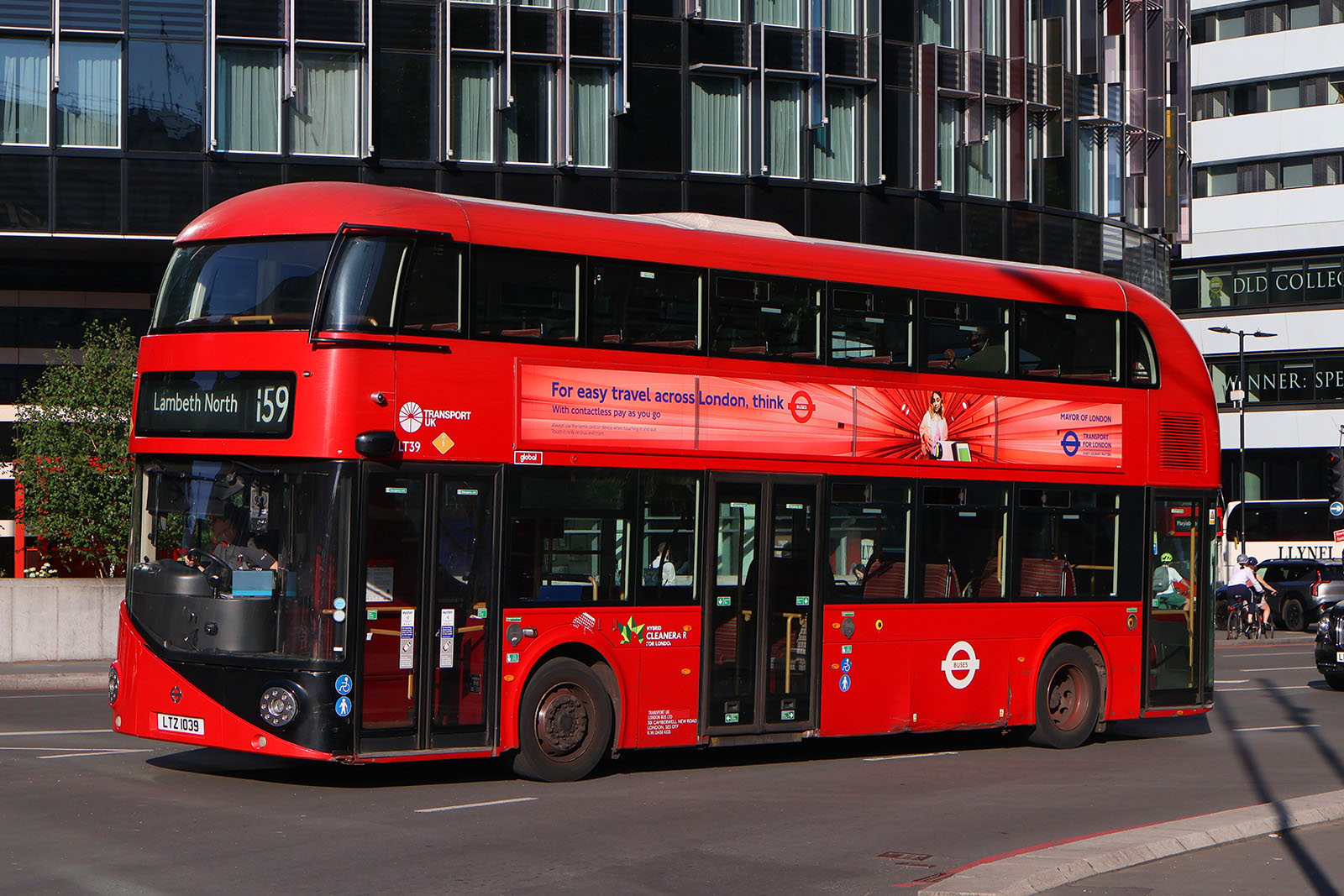
- Transport UK London Bus New Routemaster on Westminster Bridge Road in July 2025

Overview
- Operator: Transport UK London Bus
- Garage: Battersea
- Vehicle: New Routemaster
- Peak vehicle requirement: Day: 20; Night: 4
- Night-time: 24-hour service

Route
- Start: Oxford Circus station
- Via: Piccadilly Circus; Trafalgar Square; Parliament Square; Westminster Bridge; North Lambeth; Kennington; Brixton
- End: Streatham station
- Length: 8 miles (13 km)

Service
- Level: 24-hour service
- Frequency: About every 6-12 minutes
- Journey time: 42-81 minutes
- Operates: 24-hour service

London Buses route 159 is a Transport for London contracted bus route in London, England. Running between Oxford Circus and Streatham stations, it is operated by Transport UK London Bus.

== History ==
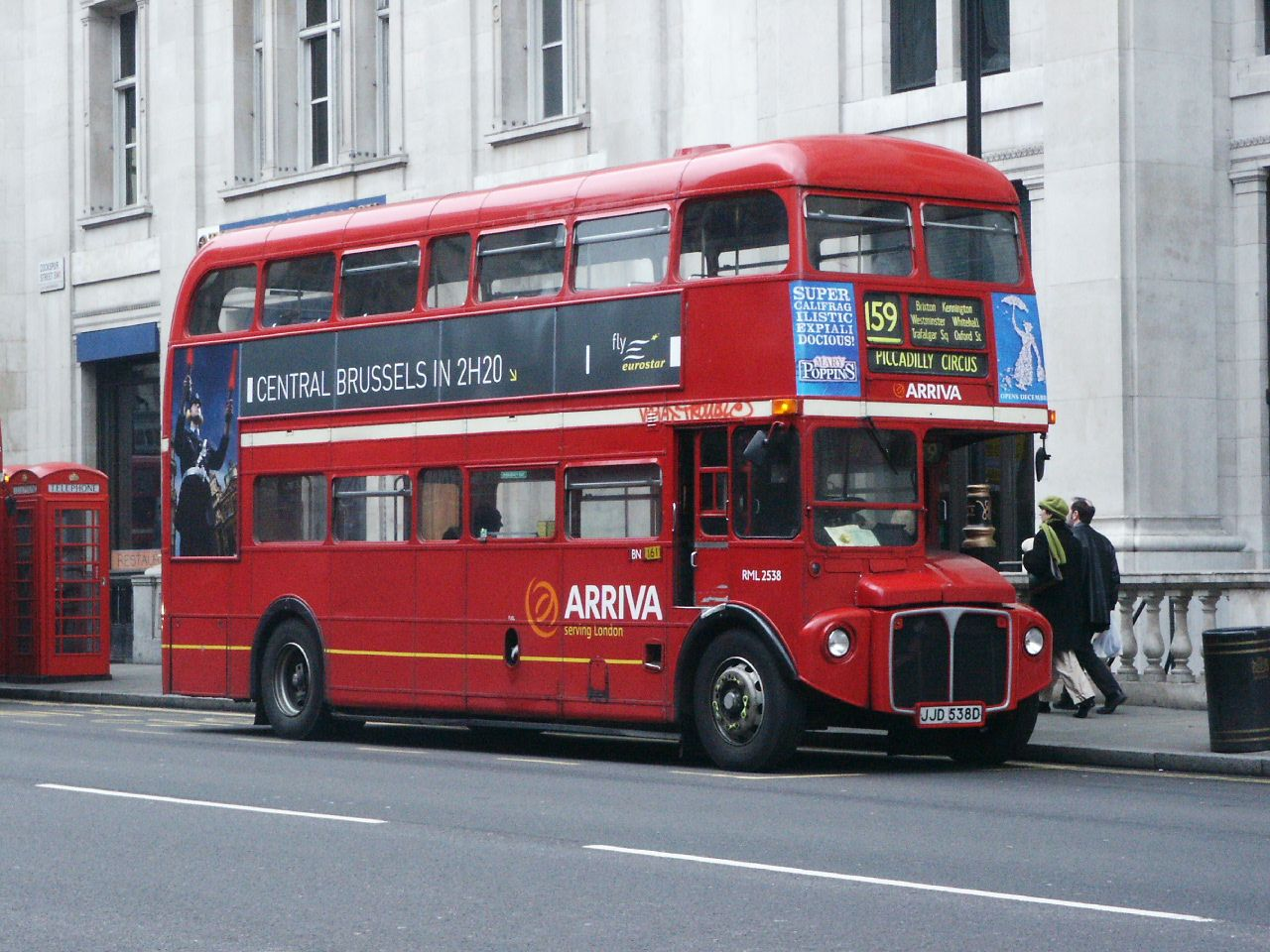
Arriva London AEC Routemaster in March 2004

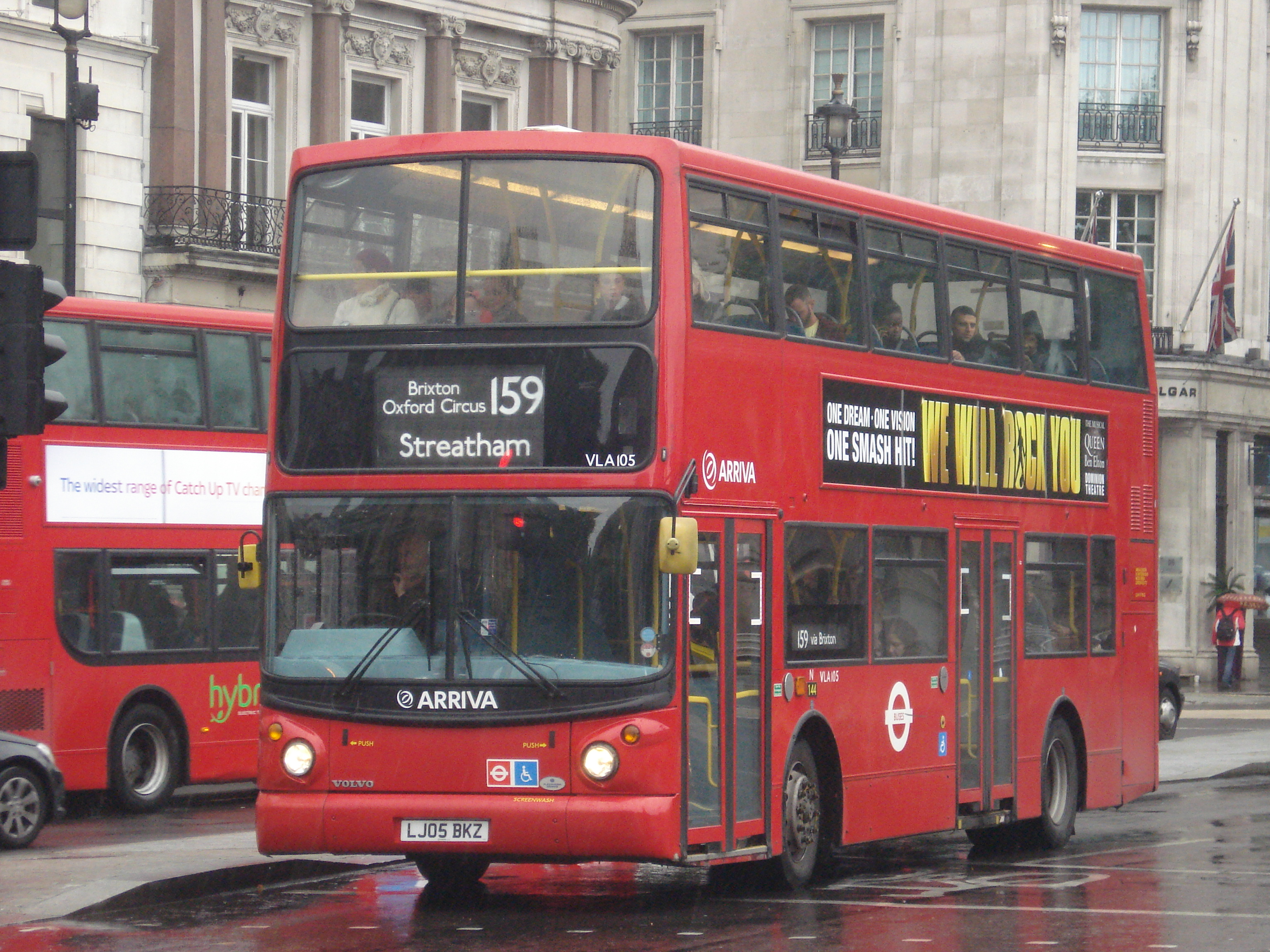
Arriva London Alexander ALX400 bodied Volvo B7TL at Trafalgar Square in October 2013

When introduced, the route was operated by STL-class double-deckers. In 1951, RTs and RTLs replaced the STLs. During 1960s, 1970s and beginnings of 1980s, the 159 route went between West End Green (West Hampstead) and Thornton Heath. In June 1970, the RTs were replaced by AEC Routemasters. During the 1990s, London Buses' South London Transport subsidiary operated the route with Routemasters in a unique red and cream livery which was retained after South London was privatised and acquired by the Cowie Group in January 1995.

On 9 December 2005, route 159 was the last route to be converted from Routemaster to low-floor bus operation, with new Alexander ALX400 bodied Volvo B7TL double deckers taking over. The route was converted gradually from the start of service on the last day, with the last Routemaster to depart from Marble Arch arriving at Brixton Garage at around 14:40.

On 24 August 2010 TfL announced an intention to extend route 159 north from Marble Arch to Paddington Basin and for it subsequently to become a 24-hour route. On 29 March 2014, route 159 was withdrawn between Marble Arch and Paddington Basin.

Arriva London successfully retained route 159 with new contracts starting on 10 December 2005 and 11 December 2010. In June 2015 Abellio London won the contract, which commenced with the introduction of the New Routemaster buses on 12 December 2015.

The route was shortened by four stops on 28 August 2021 due to the pedestrianisation of Oxford Circus. It now terminates on Regent Street.

== Current route ==
Route 159 operates via these primary locations:

- Oxford Circus station
- Piccadilly Circus
- Trafalgar Square
- Westminster station
- St Thomas' Hospital
- Lambeth North station
- Kennington
- Brixton station
- Streatham Hill station
- Streatham station
