= West Norwood railway station =

National Rail station in London, England

West Norwood
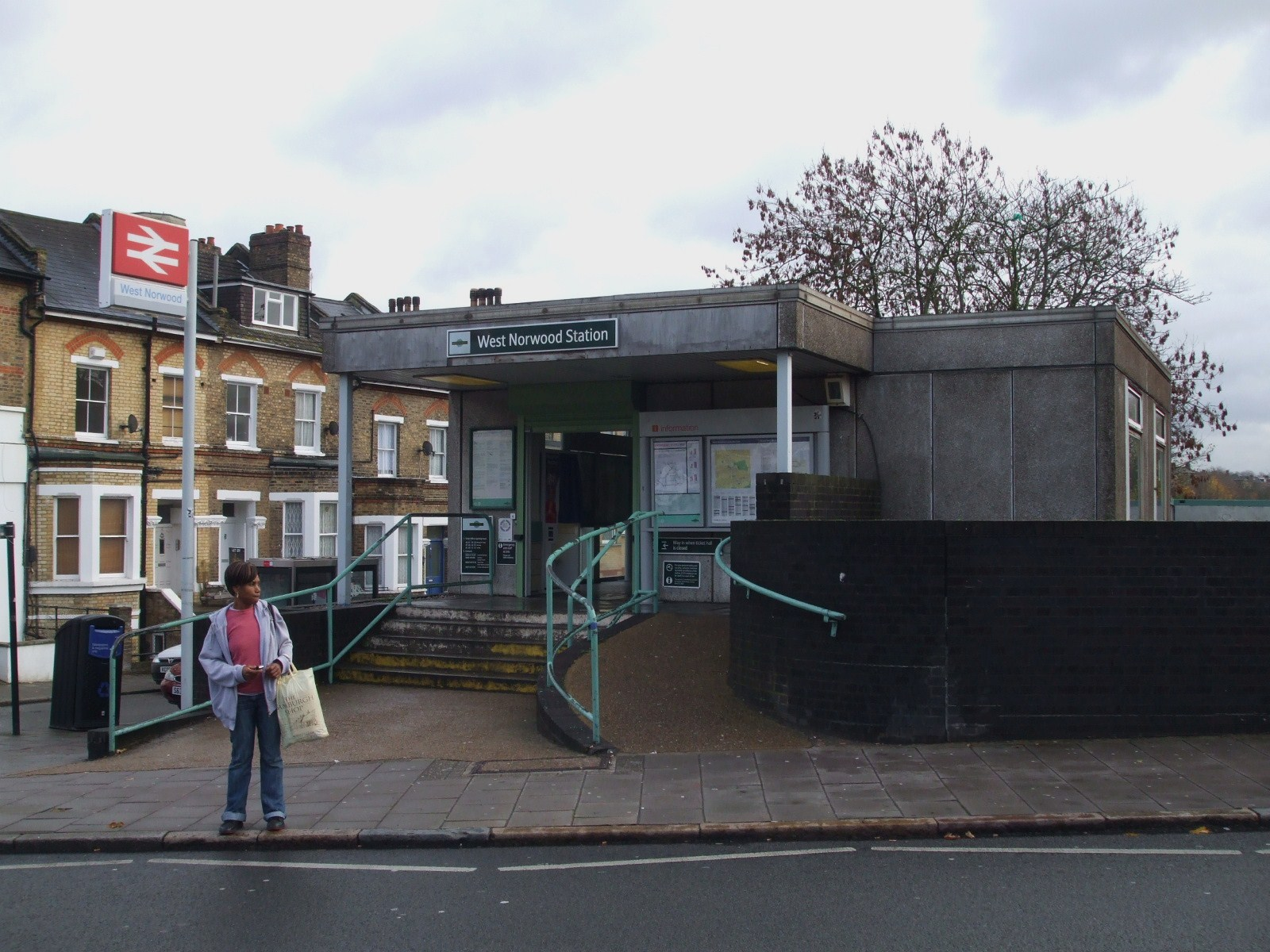
- West Norwood station building
- Interactive map of West Norwood

General information
- Location: West Norwood
- Local authority: London Borough of Lambeth
- Managed by: Southern
- Station code: WNW
- DfT category: D
- Number of platforms: 2
- Accessible: Yes
- Fare zone: 3

National Rail annual entry and exit
- 2020–21: ▼0.517 million
- Interchange: ▼8,631
- 2021–22: ▲0.914 million
- Interchange: ▲17,524
- 2022–23: ▲1.101 million
- Interchange: ▲25,947
- 2023–24: ▲1.406 million
- Interchange: ▲26,912
- 2024–25: ▲1.507 million
- Interchange: ▲34,525

Key dates
- 1 December 1856: Opened
- 1 January 1886: Renamed

Other information
- External links: Departures; Facilities
- Coordinates: 51.4318°N 0.1035°W

West Norwood railway station is in the London Borough of Lambeth in West Norwood, South London. It is 7 miles 2 chains (11.3 km) measured from London Victoria. The station, and all trains serving it, are operated by Southern, and it lies in London fare zone 3. Services from Platform 1 go to London Victoria and London Bridge via Tulse Hill. Services from Platform 2 operate to more varied destinations, including West Croydon and London Bridge via Crystal Palace.

It is located in West Norwood above Norwood High Street, and has its main entrance on the A215 road, which here is called Knights Hill. The station saw some modernisation in summer 2009, with ticket gates installed and the entrance to the eastbound platform refurbished. From spring 2010 the gates have been staffed from first to last train.

== History ==
The station was opened as Lower Norwood on 1 December 1856, as part of the West End of London and Crystal Palace Railway. It was renamed on 1 January 1886 by the London, Brighton and South Coast Railway (LBSCR), owing to the objections of an influx of new residents who objected to the "lower" prefix; they preferred the locale to be described instead as West Norwood.

Electric train services were introduced on 12 May 1911 between Victoria, Balham and Crystal Palace. They used an AC overhead wire system developed by the LBSCR as part of their Elevated Electric scheme. This system was replaced by the current third rail DC system on 3 March 1929.

The original station buildings were demolished in 1969, and replaced with prefabricated CLASP buildings.

== Service ==
All services at West Norwood are operated by Southern using Class 377 EMUs.

The typical off-peak service in trains per hour is:

- 4 tph to London Victoria
- 4 tph to London Bridge (2 of these run via Tulse Hill and 2 run via Forest Hill)
- 2 tph to West Croydon
- 2 tph to Beckenham Junction

During the evenings, the services between London Victoria and West Croydon do not run and the services between London Bridge and Beckenham Junction are reduced to hourly.

On Sundays, the services between London Bridge and Beckenham Junction do not run.

Preceding station	National Rail	Following station
Streatham Hill	Southern Crystal Palace Line	Gipsy Hill
Tulse Hill	Southern Crystal Palace Line	Gipsy Hill

== Gallery ==
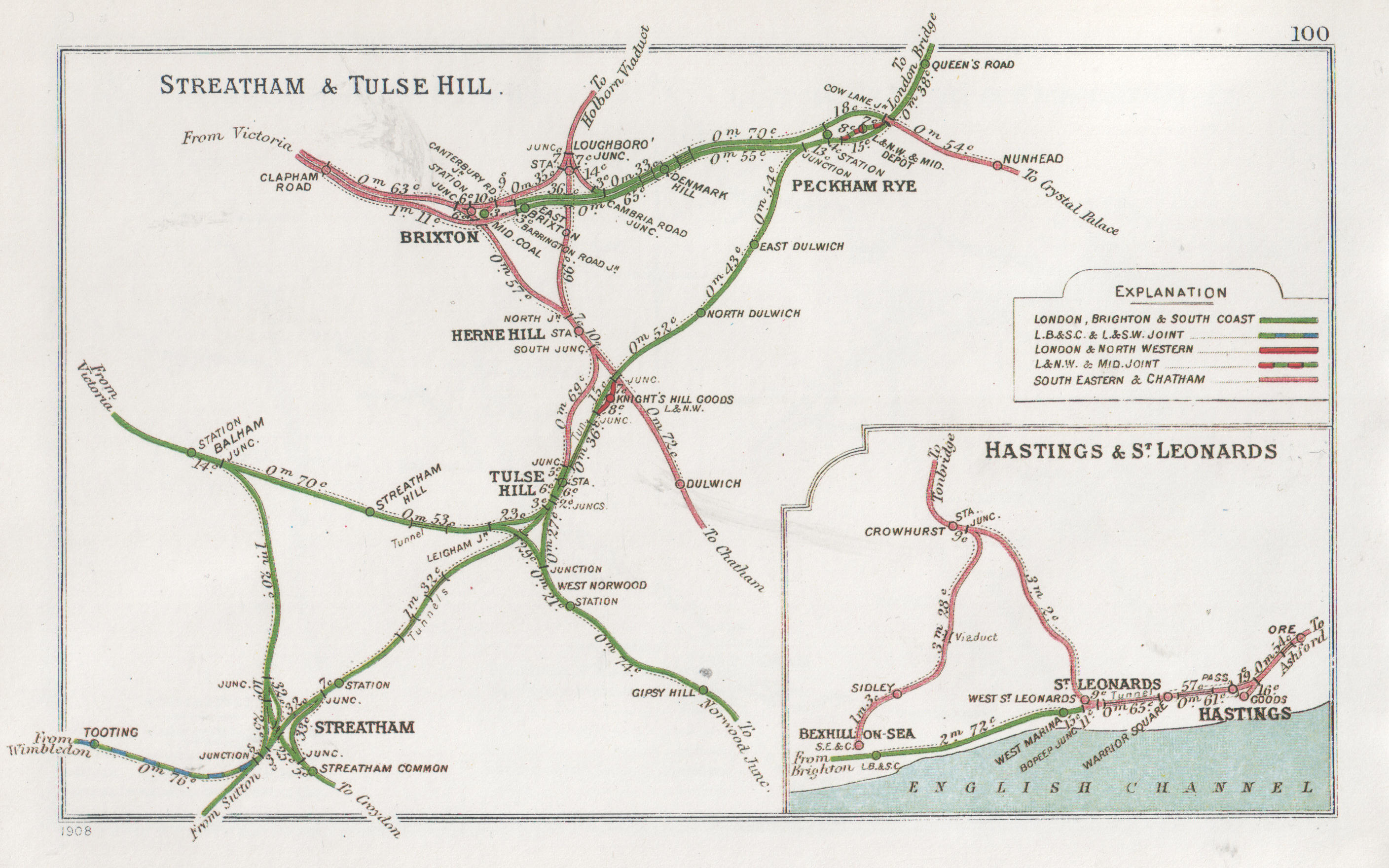
A 1908 Railway Clearing House map of lines around West Norwood railway station.

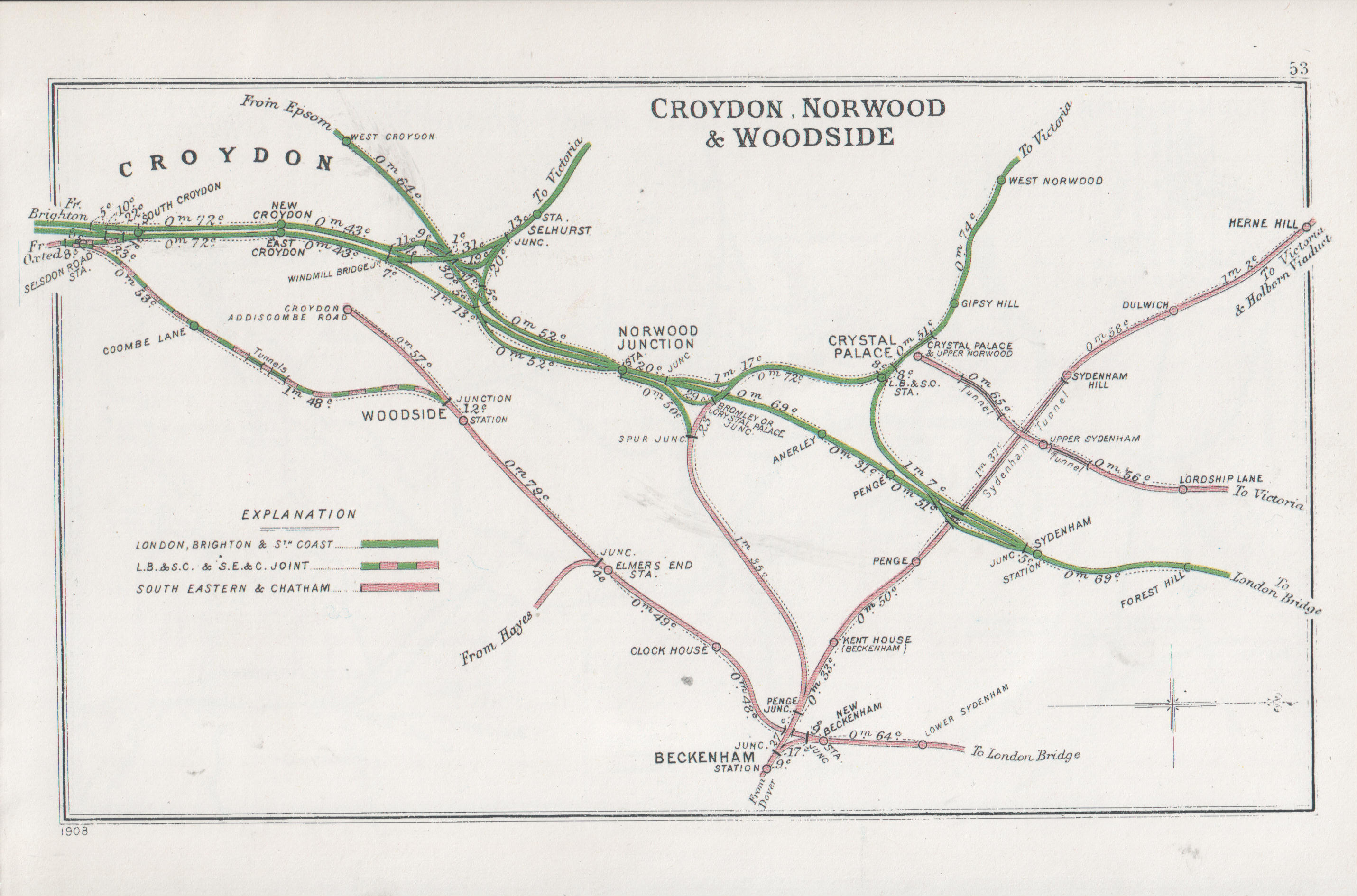
A 1908 Railway Clearing House map of lines around the West Norwood railway station, as well as surrounding lines.
