= Tulse Hill railway station =

Railway station in London, England

Tulse Hill
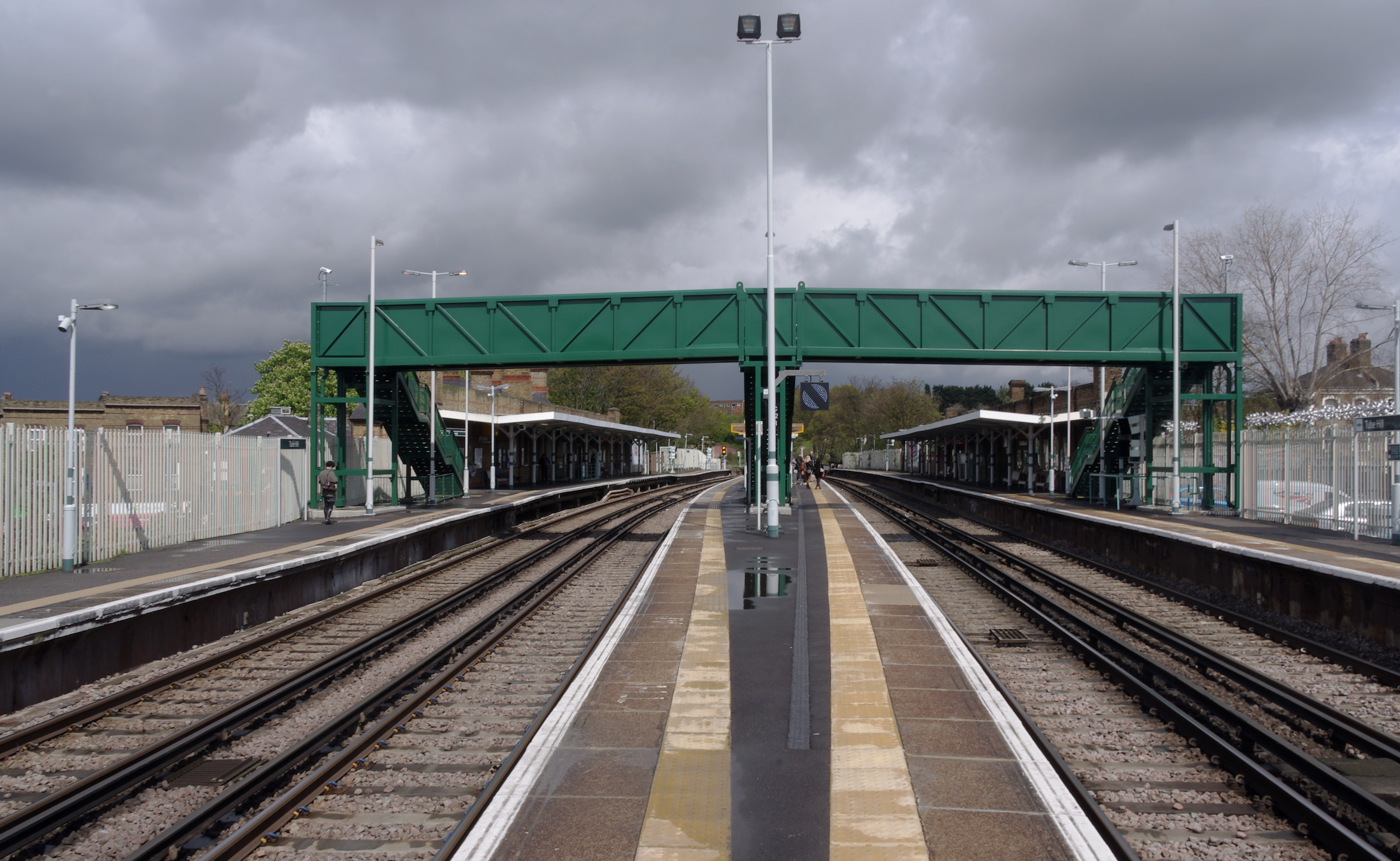
- Interactive map of Tulse Hill

General information
- Location: Tulse Hill
- Local authority: London Borough of Lambeth
- Managed by: Southern
- Station code: TUH
- DfT category: D
- Number of platforms: 4
- Fare zone: 3

National Rail annual entry and exit
- 2020–21: ▼0.776 million
- Interchange: ▼0.134 million
- 2021–22: ▲1.591 million
- Interchange: ▲0.275 million
- 2022–23: ▲1.877 million
- Interchange: ▲0.547 million
- 2023–24: ▲1.999 million
- Interchange: ▼0.373 million
- 2024–25: ▲2.182 million
- Interchange: ▲0.391 million

Key dates
- 1868: Opened (LBSCR)
- 1869: LCDR arrives
- 1871: Additional LBSCR line

Other information
- External links: Departures; Facilities
- Coordinates: 51.4399°N 0.1049°W

Tulse Hill railway station is in the Tulse Hill area of the London Borough of Lambeth in south London, between railway bridges over the A205, South Circular Road and the A215, Norwood Road. It is 5 miles 2 chains (8.1 km) measured from London Victoria. There are currently 4 platforms, each long enough for 8 coaches.

It is served by both Southern and Thameslink, and it is in London fare zone 3.

== History ==
Tulse Hill station was opened in 1868 by the London, Brighton and South Coast Railway on their line from London Bridge. In 1869, this was joined by the London, Chatham and Dover Railway's "Metropolitan Extension" line to Holborn Viaduct. The LB&SCR's through line to Streatham and Wimbledon opened in 1871.

The station originally had a bowstring-arched iron and glass roof covering all four platforms. and the brick retaining walls of this structure survive. However, it appears that the roof was demolished as a precautionary measure following the collapse of a similar one at Charing Cross in 1905, and individual platform canopies were then introduced. These had no proper foundations, and gradually subsided until the last of the Edwardian canopies were replaced in the 1990s by British Rail. Some modernisation of the station, including a new covered entrance on the east side, took place under the operator Southern, and ticket gates (funded by the Department for Transport) were installed in 2009.

The station can accommodate eight-car trains; the complex sections of track at each end of the station and a large bridge which cannot be moved mean it cannot be extended to accommodate longer ones.

== Services ==
Services at Tulse Hill are operated by Southern and Thameslink using Class 377 and 700 EMUs.

The typical off-peak service in trains per hour is:

- 4 tph to St Albans City via Herne Hill
- 4 tph to London Bridge via Peckham Rye
- 4 tph to Sutton (2 of these run via Mitcham Junction and 2 run via Wimbledon)
- 2 tph to East Croydon via Norbury
- 2 tph to Beckenham Junction via Crystal Palace

A small number of late evening Thameslink services are extended beyond St Albans City to Bedford.

On Sundays, the services between London Bridge and Beckenham Junction do not run and there are also direct services beyond St Albans City to Luton.

| Preceding station | National Rail | Following station |
|---|---|---|
| Herne Hill | Thameslink Thameslink | Streatham |
| North Dulwich | Southern London to East Croydon | Streatham |
| North Dulwich | Southern Crystal Palace Line | West Norwood |

== Connections ==
London Buses routes 2, 68, 196, 201, 322, 432, 468, P13, school route 690 and night routes N2 and N68 serve the station.

The closest London Underground station to Tulse Hill is Brixton tube station.
