= Crystal Palace line =

Crystal Palace Line
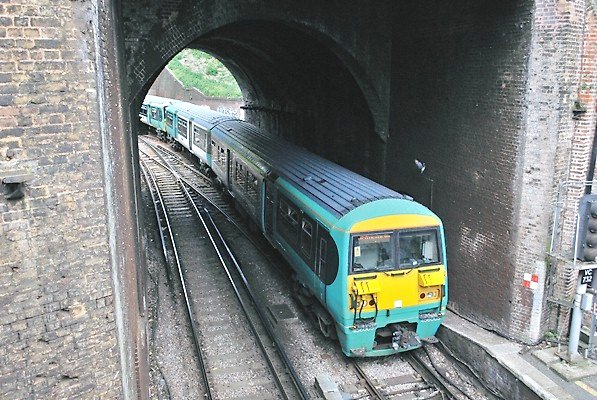
- A Southern Class 456 entering Crystal Palace station in 2009

Overview
- Status: Operational
- Owner: Network Rail
- Locale: Greater London
- Termini: Balham; Beckenham Junction
- Stations: 7

Service
- Type: Suburban rail
- System: National Rail
- Operator(s): Southern; Thameslink (non-stop)
- Rolling stock: Class 377; Class 700

History
- Opened: 1856-1858

Technical
- Number of tracks: 1-2
- Track gauge: 4 ft 8 1/2 in (1,435 mm) standard gauge
- Electrification: 750 V DC Third Rail
- Operating speed: 60 mph (97 km/h) maximum
Route map
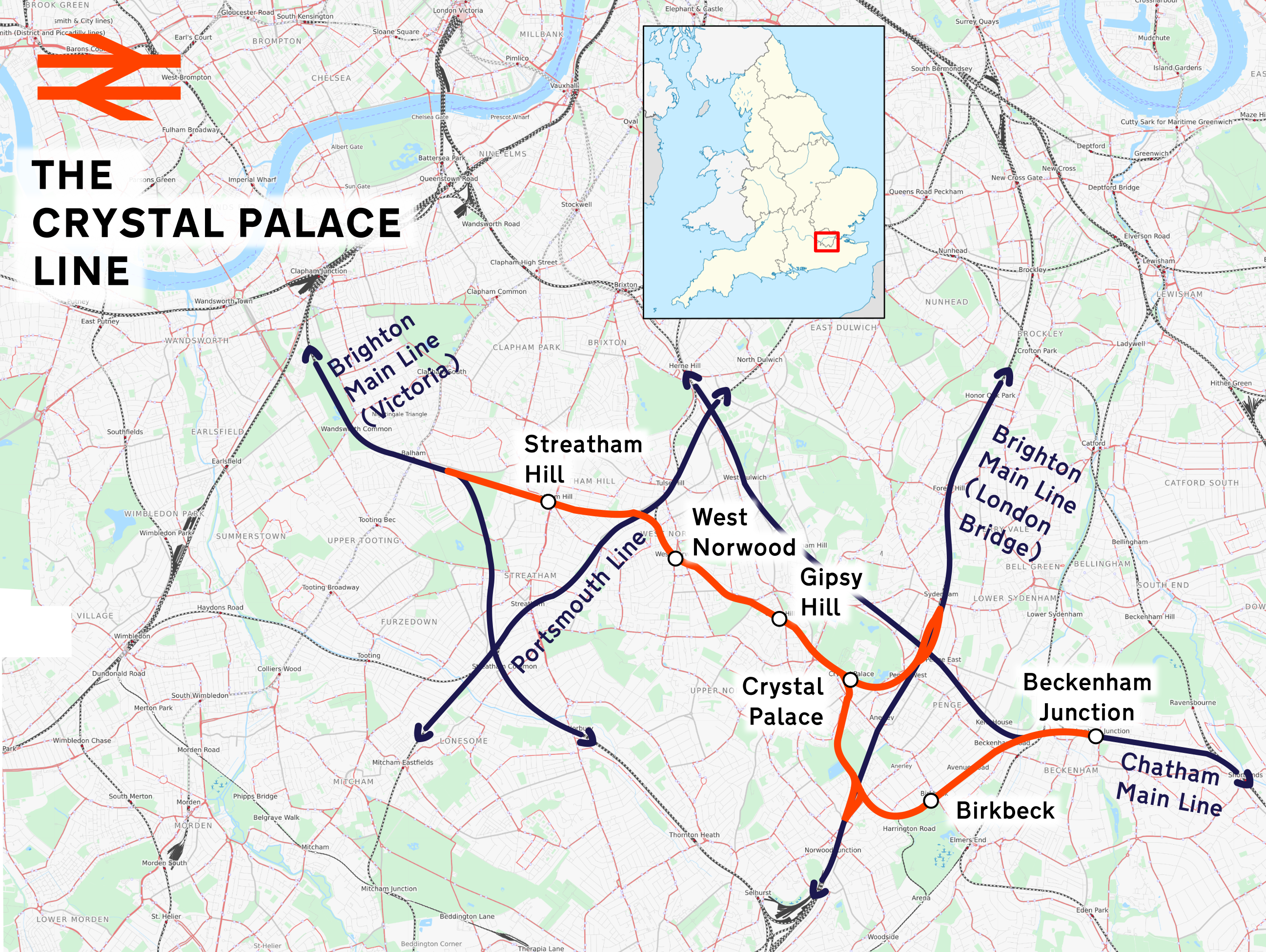
(Click to expand)

The Crystal Palace Line is a railway line in London which runs from Balham Junction to Beckenham Junction. The engineer's reference for this line is BBJ.

== Route ==
The line runs from Balham Junction on the Brighton Main Line route into London Victoria to Beckenham Junction, via Streatham Hill and Crystal Palace. The line has a junction with the Portsmouth Line at Norwood, and again meets the Brighton Main Line, this time the line into London Bridge, just beyond Crystal Palace. The line runs alongside the London Tramlink between Birkbeck and Beckenham, and has junctions with the Mid-Kent Line and the Chatham Main Line where it terminates at Beckenham Junction.

== History ==
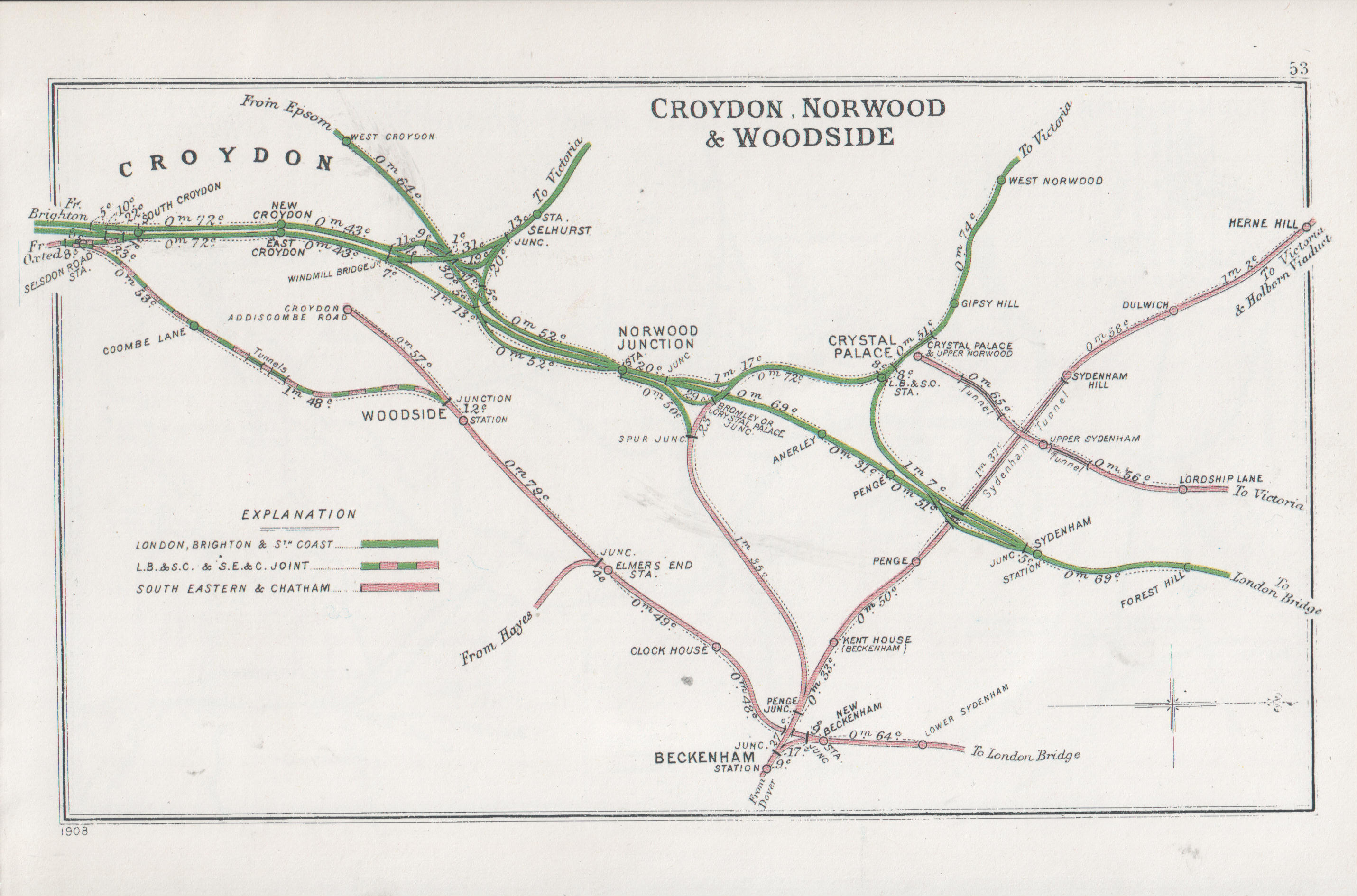
A 1908 Railway Clearing House map of lines in South London, with the West End of London and Crystal Palace Railway and Beckenham extension wending its way across the middle.

The first part of the line, between New Wandsworth and Crystal Palace (Low Level), opened 1 December 1856 as the West End of London and Crystal Palace Railway. In 1857 the route was extended to Norwood. On 3 May 1858 the company opened an extension from Bromley Junction (near Norwood Junction) to Shortlands railway station (then called Bromley) via Beckenham Junction station. The following year the original line from Pimlico to Norwood Junction was sold to the London Brighton and South Coast Railway, and the section from Bromley Junction to Shortlands to the London, Chatham and Dover Railway, but the WEL&CPR continued to provide its own passenger services. The two halves were reunited in 1921 as part of the Southern Railway following enactment of the Grouping Act.

== Services ==
Southern provides most services, with trains from London Victoria running through to West Croydon and services from London Bridge terminating at Beckenham Junction.

The line also provides a diversionary route for Thameslink services avoiding London Bridge – usually this is only in the peaks or during the night, but the Thameslink Programme engineering works have made it necessary for some Bedford to Brighton services to take this route throughout the day. These generally do not stop at any of the stations on the line.

The section from Beckenham Junction to Birkbeck is partly converted for Tramlink, with trams running from Beckenham to Croydon and Wimbledon.
