= List of bus routes in London =

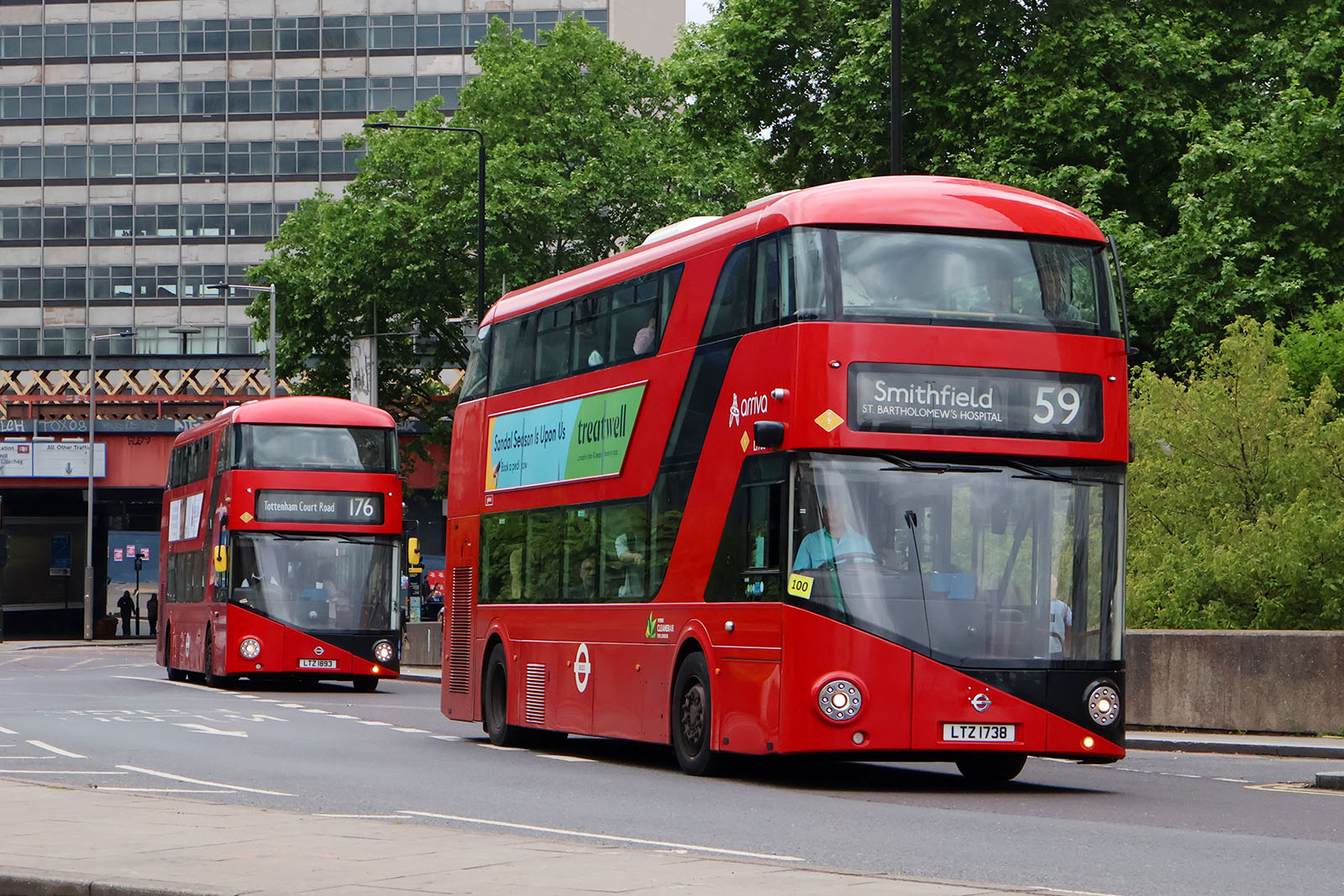
Two double-decker buses on routes 59 and 176 on Waterloo Bridge in 2025

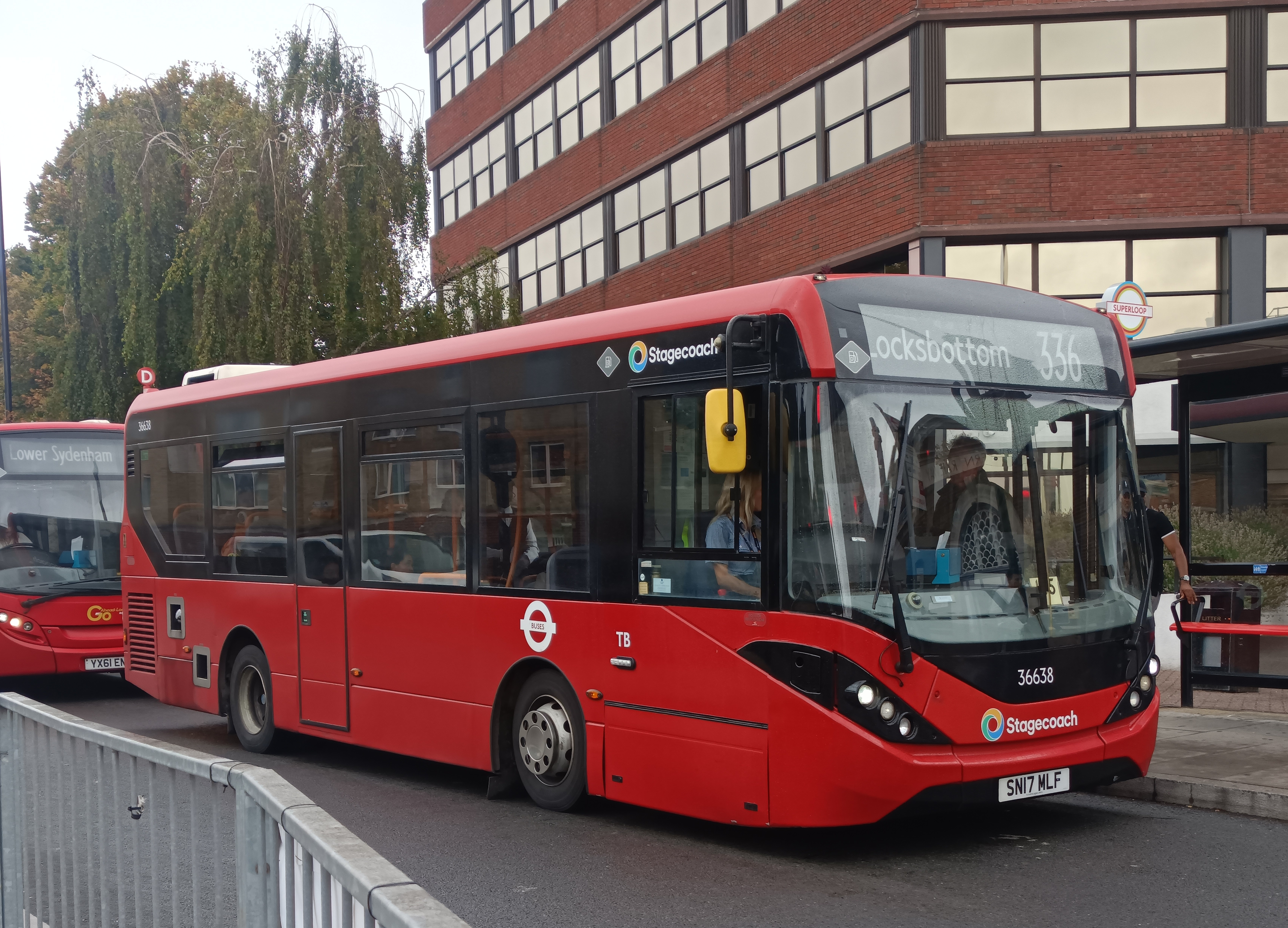
A single-decker bus on route 336 at Bromley North station in 2025

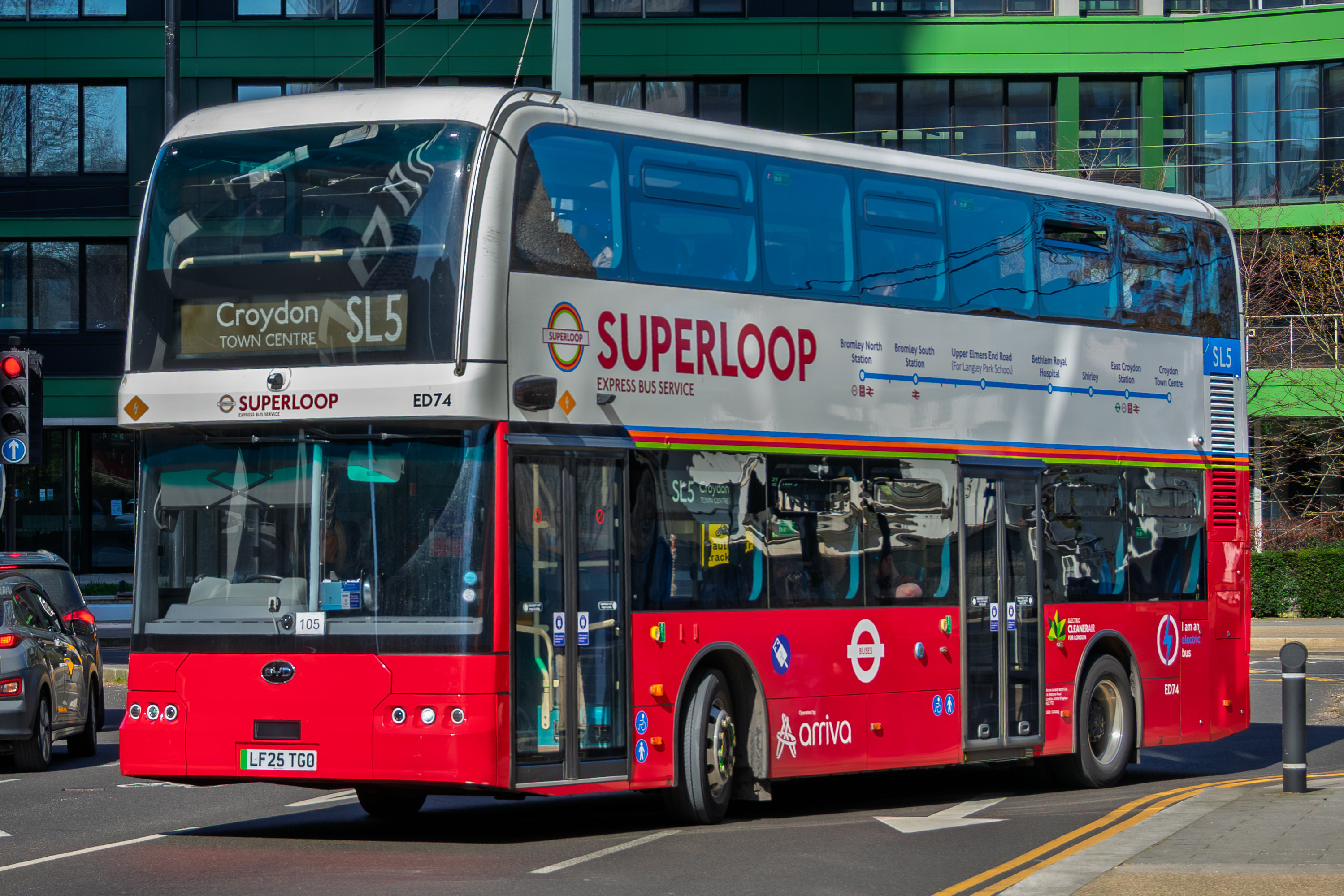
A double-decker bus on Superloop route SL5 at East Croydon station in 2026

This is a list of Transport for London (TfL) contracted bus routes in London, England, as well as non-TfL bus routes that enter Greater London (except coaches).

TfL bus routes in London are operated by 8 operators. Those operators are: Arriva London, Falcon Buses, First Bus London (London Sovereign, London Transit and London United), Go-Ahead London (Blue Triangle, Docklands Buses, London Central, London General and Metrobus), Metroline, Stagecoach London (East London, Lea Interchange Bus Company, Selkent and Thameside), Transport UK London Bus and Uno.

Some non-TfL bus routes enter Greater London, and operate with a London Service Permit provided by TfL. Therefore, those routes are shown at TfL bus stops. Those non-TfL operators are: Arriva Herts & Essex, Carlone Limited, Carousel Buses, Central Connect, Diamond South East, Falcon Buses, First Berkshire & The Thames Valley, First Essex, GoBus, Kent Country, Metrobus, NIBS Buses, Reading Buses, Red Eagle, Red Rose Travel, Reptons Coaches, Sullivan Buses, Thames Valley Buses, Uno and White Bus Services.

== Classification of route numbers ==
In Victorian times, people who took the bus would recognise the owner and the route of an omnibus (Latin for 'for all') only by its livery and its line name, with painted signs on the sides showing the two termini to indicate the route. Then, in 1906, George Samuel Dicks of the London Motor Omnibus Company decided that, as the line name 'Vanguard' had proved to be very popular, he would name all lines 'Vanguard' and number the company's five routes 1 to 5. Other operators soon saw the advantage, in that a unique route number was easier for the travelling public to remember, and so the practice of using route numbers soon spread.

=== Historic classification ===
Bus routes run by London Transport were grouped as follows:

The London Traffic Act 1924 imposed numbering known as the Bassom Scheme, named after Superintendent (later Chief Constable) Arthur Ernest Bassom of the Metropolitan Police who devised it. For many decades, variant and short workings used letter suffixes (e.g. "77B"). The numbers reflected the company that operated the route.

The numbering was revised in 1934 after London Transport was formed:

From 1934
Numbers	Type of service	
1–199	"Central Area" red double-decker routes.	
200–289	"Central Area" red single-decker routes.	
290–299	"Central Area" night buses.	
300–399	"Country Area" north of the River Thames.	(Operated by London Country; Bus Services after 1970)
400–499	"Country Area" south of the River Thames.	(Operated by London Country; Bus Services after 1970)
500–699	Trolleybuses.	
701–799	Green Line Coaches.	
800–899	"Country Area" "New Towns" routes.	(LCBS after 1970)

=== Current classification ===
Routes	Type of service
1–499	Most local day routes, including 24-hour services.
500–599	Temporary routes.
600–699	School routes, with the majority of them operating only one return journey per day.
700–799	Regional and national coach routes, including Green Line. Also used for temporary routes.
800–899	Regional and national coach routes.
900–999	One mobility bus route within TfL, detailed below.
EL-prefixed routes	East London Transit routes.
BL- and SL-prefixed routes	Superloop routes.
Other letter-prefixed routes	Local day routes, with the letter denoting a key area of the route.
SCS	Silvertown Tunnel cycle shuttle.
N-prefixed routes	Night Bus routes.

== List of routes ==
All routes operate on all days of the week and in both directions unless stated.

=== 1–99 ===
Route	Start	End	Operator	Notes
1	Canada Water bus station	Hampstead Heath	Go-Ahead London	
2	Marylebone station	Norwood bus garage	Arriva London	
3	Crystal Palace bus station	Victoria bus station	Transport UK London Bus	
4	Archway tube station	Blackfriars station	Metroline	
5	Canning Town bus station	Romford Market	Go-Ahead London	
6	London Victoria station	Willesden bus garage	Metroline	Operates as a 24-hour service.
7	East Acton	Marble Arch tube station	Metroline	
8	Bow Church	Tottenham Court Road	Stagecoach London	
9	Aldwych	Hammersmith bus station	Metroline	
10	Battersea Bridge	Newington Green	Arriva London	
11	Fulham Town Hall	London Waterloo station	Go-Ahead London	
12	Oxford Circus tube station	Dulwich Library	Go-Ahead London	Operates as a 24-hour service.
13	North Finchley bus station	London Victoria station	First Bus London	Operates as a 24-hour service.
14	Putney Heath	Russell Square	Go-Ahead London	Operates as a 24-hour service.
15	Blackwall DLR station	Charing Cross tube station	Go-Ahead London	
16	Brent Park	London Paddington station	Metroline	
17	Archway tube station	London Bridge bus station	Metroline	
18	Euston bus station	Sudbury & Harrow Road railway station	First Bus London	
19	Victoria bus station	Finsbury Park bus station	Arriva London	
20	Debden	Walthamstow bus station	Stagecoach London	
21	Holloway	Lewisham Shopping Centre	Go-Ahead London	
22	Oxford Circus tube station	Putney Lower Common	Go-Ahead London	
23	Aldwych	Westbourne Park bus garage	First Bus London	Operates as a 24-hour service.
24	Hampstead Heath	Pimlico	Transport UK London Bus	Operates as a 24-hour service.
25	Ilford	Holborn Circus	Stagecoach London	
26	St Mary of Eton	London Victoria station	Stagecoach London	
27	Camden Market	Hammersmith Grove	Transport UK London Bus	
28	Southside Wandsworth	Kensal Rise railway station	Metroline	
29	Trafalgar Square	Wood Green tube station	Arriva London	
30	Hackney Wick	Euston bus station	Metroline	
31	White City bus station	Camden Town tube station	First Bus London	
32	Edgware bus station	Kilburn Park tube station	Metroline	
33	Fulwell railway station	Castelnau	First Bus London	
34	St John the Baptist Church	Walthamstow Central station	Arriva London	
35	Clapham Junction railway station	Shoreditch	Go-Ahead London	Operates as a 24-hour service.
36	New Cross bus garage	Queen's Park station	Go-Ahead London	Operates as a 24-hour service.
37	Peckham	Putney Heath	Go-Ahead London	Operates as a 24-hour service.
38	Clapton Pond	High Holborn	Arriva London	
39	Clapham Junction railway station	Putney Bridge tube station	Go-Ahead London	
40	Clerkenwell Road	Dulwich Library	Go-Ahead London	
41	Archway tube station	Tottenham Hale bus station	Arriva London	
42	East Dulwich	Shoreditch	Go-Ahead London	
43	Friern Barnet	London Bridge bus station	Metroline	Operates as a 24-hour service.
44	Tooting railway station	London Victoria station	Go-Ahead London	
45	Morden tube station	Camberwell Green	Transport UK London Bus	
46	London Paddington station	St Bartholomew's Hospital	Metroline	Operated with electric buses since 20 October 2018.
47	Shoreditch High Street railway station	Catford bus garage	Stagecoach London	Operates as a 24-hour service.
49	Clapham Junction	White City bus station	First Bus London	
50	Fairfield Halls	Stockwell tube station	Arriva London	
51	Orpington railway station	Woolwich	Go-Ahead London	
52	Victoria bus station	Willesden bus garage	Metroline	Operates as a 24-hour service.
53	Plumstead railway station	Lower Marsh	Stagecoach London	
54	Woolwich	Elmers End station	Stagecoach London	
55	Walthamstow bus station	Oxford Circus tube station	Stagecoach London	
56	St Bartholomew's Hospital	Whipps Cross	Stagecoach London	
57	Clapham Park	Fairfield bus station	Go-Ahead London	Operates as a 24-hour service.
58	Walthamstow bus station	East Ham	Stagecoach London	
59	St Bartholomew's Hospital	Clapham Park	Arriva London	
60	Oasis Academy Coulsdon‡ Old Coulsdon	Streatham railway station	Arriva London	‡ One afternoon schoolday-only journey to Streatham railway station.
61	Bromley North railway station	Chislehurst	Stagecoach London	
62	Barking	Marks Gate	Stagecoach London	
63	London King's Cross railway station	Honor Oak	Transport UK London Bus	
64	New Addington	Thornton Heath Pond	Arriva London	Operates as a 24-hour service.
65	Ealing Broadway station	Kingston upon Thames	First Bus London	
66	Leytonstone bus station	Romford railway station	Arriva London	
67	Wood Green tube station	Dalston	Arriva London	
68	Euston bus station	West Norwood	Transport UK London Bus	
69	Canning Town bus station	Walthamstow bus station	Go-Ahead London	Operates as a 24-hour service.
70	South Kensington tube station	Chiswick Business Park	First Bus London	
71	Chessington World of Adventures	Cromwell Road bus station	First Bus London	
72	East Acton	Hammersmith Bridge	First Bus London	
73	Oxford Circus tube station	Stoke Newington Common	Arriva London	
74	Baker Street tube station	Putney Exchange	Go-Ahead London	
75	Fairfield Halls	Lewisham station	Stagecoach London	
76	Tottenham Hale bus station	Lower Marsh	Arriva London	Operates as a 24-hour service.
77	Tooting railway station	London Waterloo station	Go-Ahead London	
78	Nunhead	Shoreditch	Go-Ahead London	
79	Stonebridge Park station	Edgware bus station	First Bus London	
80	Downview & High Down Prisons	Hackbridge	Go-Ahead London	
81	Slough	Hounslow bus station	Metroline	
83	Golders Green tube station	Alperton	Metroline	
85	Kingston upon Thames	Putney Bridge tube station	First Bus London	
86	Romford railway station	Stratford bus station	Stagecoach London	
87	Aldwych	Wandsworth	Go-Ahead London	Originally numbered 77A until 3 June 2006.
88	Parliament Hill Fields	Clapham Common	Go-Ahead London	Operates as a 24-hour service.
89	Lewisham station	Slade Green railway station	Go-Ahead London	
90	Feltham	Northolt tube station	Metroline	Operated with double-decker buses since 29 August 2015.
91	Wood Green tube station	Trafalgar Square	Go-Ahead London	
92	Ealing Hospital	Brent Park	Metroline	
93	North Cheam	Putney Bridge tube station	Go-Ahead London	Operates as a 24-hour service.
94	Acton Green	Marble Arch tube station	First Bus London	Operates as a 24-hour service.
95	Shepherd's Bush tube station	Southall Town Hall	Metroline	
96	Bluewater Shopping Centre	Woolwich	Arriva London	
97	Chingford railway station	Stratford City bus station	Stagecoach London	
98	Red Lion Square	Willesden bus garage	Metroline	
99	Bexleyheath town centre	Woolwich	Go-Ahead London	

=== 100–199 ===
Route	Start	End	Operator	Notes
100	St Bartholomew's Hospital	Shadwell railway station	Go-Ahead London	Operated with electric buses since January 2020.
101	Beckton bus station	Wanstead	Go-Ahead London	
102	Brent Cross bus station	Edmonton Green bus station	Arriva London	Operates as a 24-hour service between Edmonton Green bus station and Golders Green tube station.
103	Chase Cross	Rainham railway station	Arriva London	
104	Beckton bus station	Stratford bus station	Go-Ahead London	
105	Greenford station	Heathrow Central bus station	First Bus London	Operates as a 24-hour service.
106	Finsbury Park bus station	Whitechapel	Go-Ahead London	
107	Edgware bus station	New Barnet railway station	Metroline	Crosses border into Hertfordshire in Elstree.
108	Lewisham Shopping Centre	Stratford International station North Greenwich bus station‡	Go-Ahead London	Operates as a 24-hour service. ‡ Night-only double-decker journeys to and from Lewisham Shopping Centre.
109	Croydon town centre	Brixton tube station	Transport UK London Bus	
110	Hammersmith bus station	Hounslow bus station	First Bus London	
111	Heathrow Central bus station	Cromwell Road bus station	Transport UK London Bus	Operates as a 24-hour service.
112	North Finchley bus station	Ealing Broadway station	Metroline	
113	Edgware bus station	Marble Arch tube station	Metroline	
114	Mill Hill Broadway railway station	Ruislip tube station	Metroline	
115	Aldgate bus station	East Ham	Go-Ahead London	
116	Ashford Hospital	Hounslow bus station	First Bus London	
117	Staines-upon-Thames	West Middlesex University Hospital	First Bus London	
119	Bromley North railway station	The Colonnades	Transport UK London Bus	Operates as a 24-hour service.
120	Hounslow bus station	Northolt tube station	Metroline	
121	Turnpike Lane bus station	Enfield Island Village	Arriva London	
122	Crystal Palace	Plumstead bus garage	Stagecoach London	
123	Ilford	Turnpike Lane bus station	Go-Ahead London	Operates as a 24-hour service.
124	St Dunstan's College	Eltham	Stagecoach London	
125	Colindale tube station	Winchmore Hill	First Bus London	
126	Bromley	Eltham	Go-Ahead London	
127	Purley railway station	Tooting Broadway tube station	Go-Ahead London	
128	Claybury Broadway	Romford railway station	Stagecoach London	Operates as a 24-hour service.
129	Lewisham Shopping Centre	Gallions Reach	Go-Ahead London	
130	New Addington	Thornton Heath	Transport UK London Bus	
131	Fairfield bus station	Tooting Broadway tube station	Go-Ahead London	
132	Bexleyheath town centre	North Greenwich bus station	Go-Ahead London	
133	Streatham railway station	Red Lion Square	Transport UK London Bus	
134	North Finchley bus station	University College Hospital	Metroline	Operates as a 24-hour service.
135	Cubitt Town	Moorfields Eye Hospital	Stagecoach London	
136	Elephant and Castle	Grove Park railway station	Stagecoach London	
137	Marble Arch tube station	Streatham Hill	Arriva London	
138	Bromley North railway station	Coney Hall	Stagecoach London	
139	Golders Green tube station	London Waterloo station	Metroline	Operates as a 24-hour service.
140	Harrow Weald bus garage	Hayes & Harlington railway station	Metroline	Withdrawn between Heathrow Central bus station and Hayes & Harlington railway station on 7 December 2019.
141	London Bridge bus station	Palmers Green	Arriva London	
142	Brent Cross bus station	Watford Junction railway station	Metroline	
143	Archway tube station	Brent Cross bus station	Metroline	
144	Edmonton Green bus station	Muswell Hill	Go-Ahead London	
145	Dagenham	Leytonstone bus station	Stagecoach London	
146	Bromley North railway station	Downe	Stagecoach London	
147	Canning Town bus station	Ilford	Go-Ahead London	
148	Camberwell Green	White City bus station	First Bus London	Operates as a 24-hour service.
149	Edmonton Green bus station	London Bridge bus station	Arriva London	Operates as a 24-hour service.
150	Becontree Heath	Chigwell Row	Arriva London	
151	Wallington	Worcester Park railway station	Go-Ahead London	
152	New Malden	Pollards Hill	Go-Ahead London	
153	Finsbury Park bus station	Liverpool Street bus station	Metroline	
154	Morden tube station	West Croydon bus station	Go-Ahead London	
155	Elephant and Castle	St George's Hospital	Go-Ahead London	
156	Vauxhall bus station	Wimbledon station	Transport UK London Bus	
157	Crystal Palace bus station	Morden tube station	Go-Ahead London	
158	Chingford Mount	Stratford bus station	Arriva London	Operates as a 24-hour service.
159	Oxford Circus tube station	Streatham railway station	Transport UK London Bus	Operates as a 24-hour service.
160	Sidcup railway station	Catford Bridge railway station	Stagecoach London	
161	Chislehurst	North Greenwich bus station	Stagecoach London	
162	Beckenham Junction station	Eltham railway station	Go-Ahead London	
163	Morden tube station	Wimbledon	Go-Ahead London	
164	Wimbledon	Sutton railway station	Go-Ahead London	
165	Rainham	The Brewery	Stagecoach London	
166	Banstead; Epsom Hospital‡	West Croydon bus station	Arriva London	‡ One bus per hour Mon-Sat.
167	Ilford	Loughton tube station	Stagecoach London	
169	Barking	Clayhall	Stagecoach London	
170	Roehampton	London Victoria station	Go-Ahead London	
171	Elephant and Castle	Catford bus garage	Go-Ahead London	Ran to Holborn tube station until 15 June 2019.
172	Brockley Rise	Aldwych	Go-Ahead London	Ran to Clerkenwell Green until 15 June 2019.
173	Beckton bus station	King George Hospital	Stagecoach London	
174	CEME	Harold Hill	Stagecoach London	
175	Dagenham	Hillrise Estate	Arriva London	
176	Penge	Tottenham Court Road station	Go-Ahead London	Operates as a 24-hour service.
177	Peckham	Thamesmead	Stagecoach London	
178	Lewisham station	Woolwich	Go-Ahead London	
179	Chingford railway station	Ilford	Stagecoach London	
180	Erith Quarry	North Greenwich bus station	Stagecoach London	
181	Grove Park railway station	Lewisham station	Stagecoach London	
182	Brent Cross bus station	Harrow Weald	Metroline	
183	Pinner tube station	Golders Green tube station	First Bus London	
184	Ducks Island	Turnpike Lane bus station	Go-Ahead London	
185	Lewisham station	London Victoria station	Go-Ahead London	
186	Brent Cross bus station	Northwick Park Hospital	Metroline	
187	O2 Centre	Central Middlesex Hospital	Metroline	
188	North Greenwich bus station	Tottenham Court Road station	Go-Ahead London	Operates as a 24-hour service.
189	Brent Cross bus station	Marble Arch tube station	Metroline	Operates as a 24-hour service.
190	Empress State Building	Richmond bus station	Metroline	
191	Brimsdown railway station	Edmonton Green bus station	Arriva London	
192	Enfield Town	Tottenham Hale station	Arriva London	
193	County Park Estate	Queen's Hospital	Stagecoach London	
194	Lower Sydenham	West Croydon bus station	Arriva London	
195	Brentford	Charville Lane Estate	Transport UK London Bus	
196	Elephant and Castle	Norwood Junction railway station	Arriva London	
197	Fairfield Halls	Peckham	Go-Ahead London	
198	Shrublands	Thornton Heath	Arriva London	
199	Canada Water bus station	Catford bus garage	Stagecoach London	

=== 200–299 ===
Route	Start	End	Operator	Notes
200	Mitcham	Raynes Park	Go-Ahead London	
201	Herne Hill railway station	Morden tube station	Transport UK London Bus	
202	Crystal Palace	Blackheath	Arriva London	
203	Staines-upon-Thames	Hounslow bus station	First Bus London	
204	Edgware bus station	Sudbury Town tube station	Metroline	
205	Bow Church	Marble Arch tube station	Stagecoach London	
206	Kilburn Park tube station	Wembley Park	Metroline	
207	Hayes Bypass	White City bus station	Transport UK London Bus	
208	Lewisham station	Orpington	Stagecoach London	
209	Hammersmith bus station	Barnes	First Bus London	
210	Brent Cross bus station	Finsbury Park bus station	Metroline	
211	Hammersmith bus station	Battersea Power Station	Transport UK London Bus	Withdrawn between London Waterloo station and Sloane Square tube station and rerouted to Battersea Power Station on 29 June 2024.
212	Chingford railway station	St. James Street railway station	Go-Ahead London	
213	Fairfield bus station	Sutton bus garage	Go-Ahead London	Operates as a 24-hour service.
214	Highgate School	Finsbury Square	Go-Ahead London	Operates as a 24-hour service.
215	Walthamstow bus station	Lee Valley Campsite	Stagecoach London	
216	Cromwell Road bus station	Staines-upon-Thames	First Bus London	
217	Turnpike Lane bus station	Waltham Cross	Arriva London	
218	North Acton tube station	Hammersmith bus station	First Bus London	Introduced on 7 December 2019 with a peak frequency of every 10 minutes.
219	Clapham Junction	Wimbledon	Go-Ahead London	
220	Southside Wandsworth	Willesden Junction station	First Bus London	Operates as a 24-hour service.
221	Edgware bus station	Turnpike Lane bus station	Arriva London	
222	Uxbridge tube station	Hounslow bus station	Metroline	Operates as a 24-hour service.
223	Harrow View	Wembley Central station	Metroline	
224	St Raphael's Estate	Alperton	Metroline	
225	Canada Water bus station	Hither Green railway station	Stagecoach London	
226	Ealing Broadway station	Golders Green tube station	First Bus London	
227	Crystal Palace bus station	Bromley North railway station	Go-Ahead London	
228	Central Middlesex Hospital	Maida Hill	Metroline	
229	Queen Mary's Hospital	Thamesmead	Arriva London	
230	Upper Walthamstow	Wood Green tube station	Go-Ahead London	
231	Enfield Chase railway station	Turnpike Lane bus station	Metroline	
232	St Raphael's Estate	Haringey Heartlands	Go-Ahead London	
233	Eltham railway station	Swanley	Go-Ahead London	
234	The Spires Barnet	Archway tube station	Metroline	
235	Great West Quarter	Sunbury Village	First Bus London	
236	Finsbury Park bus station	Hackney Wick	Stagecoach London	
237	Hounslow Heath	White City bus station	Metroline	
238	Barking station	Stratford bus station	Stagecoach London	Operates as a 24-hour service.
240	Edgware bus station	Golders Green tube station	Metroline	
241	Royal Wharf	Here East	Stagecoach London	
242	Aldgate bus station	Homerton University Hospital	Stagecoach London	
243	London Waterloo station	Wood Green tube station	Arriva London	Operates as a 24-hour service.
244	Abbey Wood	Queen Elizabeth Hospital	Go-Ahead London	
245	Alperton	Golders Green tube station	Metroline	
246	Bromley North railway station	Westerham; Chartwell‡	Stagecoach London	‡ Eight buses on Summer Sundays when Chartwell is open to the public.
247	Barkingside tube station	Romford railway station	Stagecoach London	
248	Cranham	Romford Market	Arriva London	
249	Anerley railway station	Clapham Common	Arriva London	
250	West Croydon bus station	Brixton tube station	Arriva London	
251	Arnos Grove tube station	Edgware bus station	Metroline	
252	Collier Row	Hornchurch	Stagecoach London	
253	Euston bus station	Hackney Central railway station	Arriva London	
254	Holloway	Aldgate tube station	Arriva London	
255	Balham station	Pollards Hill	Arriva London	
256	Hornchurch	Noak Hill	Stagecoach London	
257	Stratford bus station	Walthamstow bus station	Stagecoach London	
258	South Harrow tube station	Watford Junction railway station	Metroline	
259	Ponders End	Holloway	Arriva London	
260	Golders Green tube station	White City bus station	Metroline	
261	Lewisham station	Princess Royal University Hospital	Stagecoach London	
262	Gallions Reach Shopping Park	Stratford bus station	Go-Ahead London	
263	Barnet Hospital	Highbury Barn	Metroline	
264	West Croydon bus station	St George's Hospital	Go-Ahead London	Operates as a 24-hour service.
265	Putney Bridge tube station	Tolworth	Go-Ahead London	
266	Brent Cross bus station	Acton Town Hall	Metroline	
267	Fulwell	Hammersmith bus station	Transport UK London Bus	
268	O2 Centre	Golders Green tube station	Metroline	
269	Bexleyheath town centre	Bromley North railway station	Go-Ahead London	
270	Mitcham	Putney Bridge tube station	Transport UK London Bus	
272	Shepherd's Bush Green	Chiswick	First Bus London	
273	Lewisham	Petts Wood railway station	Stagecoach London	
274	Angel Islington	Lancaster Gate tube station	Metroline	
275	Barkingside	St. James Street railway station	Stagecoach London	Crosses border into Essex in Chigwell.
276	Newham University Hospital	Stoke Newington Common	Stagecoach London	
277	Cubitt Town	Dalston	Stagecoach London	
278	Heathrow Central bus station	Ruislip tube station	Transport UK London Bus	Introduced on 7 December 2019.
279	Stamford Hill	Waltham Cross	Arriva London	
280	St George's Hospital	Belmont railway station	Go-Ahead London	
281	Hounslow bus station	Tolworth railway station	First Bus London	Operates as a 24-hour service.
282	Ealing Hospital	Mount Vernon Hospital	Metroline	
284	Lewisham station	Grove Park Cemetery	Stagecoach London	
285	Heathrow Central bus station	Cromwell Road bus station	Transport UK London Bus	Operates as a 24-hour service.
286	Cutty Sark	Queen Mary's Hospital	Go-Ahead London	
287	Barking station	Rainham	Stagecoach London	
288	Broadfields Estate	Queensbury	First Bus London	
289	Elmers End station	Purley railway station	Arriva London	
290	Staines-upon-Thames	Twickenham	First Bus London	
291	Queen Elizabeth Hospital	Woodlands Estate	Go-Ahead London	
292	Borehamwood	Colindale	Uno	
293	Morden tube station	Epsom Hospital	First Bus London	
294	Havering Country Park	Noak Hill	Stagecoach London	
295	Clapham Junction railway station	Ladbroke Grove	First Bus London	Operates as a 24-hour service.
296	Ilford	Romford railway station	Stagecoach London	
297	Willesden bus garage	Ealing Broadway station	Metroline	Operates as a 24-hour service.
298	Arnos Grove tube station	Potters Bar railway station	Uno	
299	Muswell Hill	Cockfosters tube station	Go-Ahead London	

=== 300–399 ===
Route	Start	End	Operator	Notes
300	Canning Town bus station	Plashet	Go-Ahead London	
301	Bexleyheath town centre	Woolwich	Stagecoach London	Introduced on 13 July 2019.
302	Mill Hill Broadway railway station	Kensal Rise railway station	Metroline	
303	Kingsbury	Edgware bus station	First Bus London	
304	Manor Park	Custom House station	Go-Ahead London	Introduced on 21 May 2022 in preparation for the Elizabeth line.
306	Acton Vale	Sands End	Transport UK London Bus	Introduced on 7 December 2019 with a peak frequency of every 12 minutes.
307	Barnet Hospital	Brimsdown railway station	Arriva London	
308	Clapton Pond	Wanstead	Stagecoach London	
309	Bethnal Green	Canning Town bus station	Stagecoach London	
310	Golders Green tube station	Stamford Hill bus garage	Stagecoach London	Introduced on 1 September 2024, intended to benefit local Jewish communities in the two areas.
312	Norwood Junction railway station	Purley	Arriva London	
313	Chingford railway station Southbury railway station‡	Potters Bar railway station Dame Alice Owen's School‡	Metroline	‡ One afternoon schoolday-only journey from Dame Alice Owen's School. ‡ One morning schoolday-only journey from Southbury railway station.
314	New Addington tram stop	Eltham railway station	Stagecoach London	
315	Springfield University Hospital	West Norwood	Transport UK London Bus	
316	Brent Cross West railway station	White City bus station	Metroline	
317	Enfield Town	Waltham Cross	Metroline	
318	North Middlesex University Hospital	Stamford Hill bus garage	Go-Ahead London	
319	Sloane Square tube station	Streatham Hill	Arriva London	
320	Biggin Hill Valley	Catford Bridge railway station	Go-Ahead London	
321	Foots Cray	New Cross	Go-Ahead London	Operates as a 24-hour service.
322	Crystal Palace bus station	Clapham Common	Go-Ahead London	
323	Canning Town bus station	Mile End tube station	Stagecoach London	
324	Brent Cross	Elstree	Metroline	
325	East Beckton	Prince Regent DLR station	Go-Ahead London	
326	The Spires Barnet	Brent Cross bus station	First Bus London	
327	Waltham Cross	Elsinge Estate	Metroline	Does not operate on Sundays.
328	World's End	Golders Green tube station	Metroline	
329	Enfield Town	Turnpike Lane bus station	Arriva London	
330	Thames Barrier	Wanstead Park railway station	Go-Ahead London	
331	Uxbridge tube station	Ruislip tube station	Metroline	Runs via Harefield. Crosses border into Hertfordshire at Batchworth Heath and into Buckinghamshire in Denham.
333	Elephant and Castle	Tooting Broadway tube station	Go-Ahead London	
335	Kidbrooke	North Greenwich bus station	Arriva London	Introduced on 26 October 2019.
336	Locksbottom	Catford Bridge railway station	Stagecoach London	
337	Clapham Junction	Richmond bus station	Transport UK London Bus	
339	Leytonstone bus station	Shadwell DLR station	Stagecoach London	
340	Edgware bus station	Harrow bus station	First Bus London	
341	London Waterloo station	Meridian Water railway station	Arriva London	Operates as a 24-hour service.
343	Tower Gateway DLR station	New Cross	Go-Ahead London	
344	Clapham Junction railway station	Liverpool Street bus station	Transport UK London Bus	Operates as a 24-hour service.
345	Peckham	Natural History Museum	Transport UK London Bus	Operates as a 24-hour service.
346	Upminster Park Estate	Harold Hill	Stagecoach London	
350	Hayes	Heathrow Terminal 5	Transport UK London Bus	
352	Bromley North railway station	Lower Sydenham	Go-Ahead London	
353	Forestdale	Ramsden	Go-Ahead London	
354	Bromley North railway station	Penge	Go-Ahead London	
355	Mitcham	Brixton tube station	Go-Ahead London	
356	Monks Orchard	Sydenham Hill	Stagecoach London	
357	Chingford Hatch	Whipps Cross; Whipps Cross University Hospital‡	Go-Ahead London	‡ Sundays only.
358	Crystal Palace bus station	Orpington railway station	Go-Ahead London	
359	Addington Village Interchange	Purley	Transport UK London Bus	
360	Elephant and Castle	Royal Albert Hall	Go-Ahead London	
362	King George Hospital	Grange Hill tube station	Stagecoach London	
363	Elephant and Castle	Crystal Palace	Transport UK London Bus	
364	Dagenham East	Ilford	Go-Ahead London	
365	Beam Park	Havering Country Park	Stagecoach London	Operates as a 24-hour service.
366	Beckton bus station	Redbridge	Go-Ahead London	
367	West Croydon bus station	Bromley North railway station	Transport UK London Bus	
368	Barking	Chadwell Heath	Go-Ahead London	
370	The Mercury Mall	Lakeside Shopping Centre	Arriva London	
371	Richmond	Kingston upon Thames	First Bus London	
372	Hornchurch	Lakeside Shopping Centre	Stagecoach London	Partially replaced former route 324 that ran between Hornchurch and Bluewater Shopping Centre.
375	Romford railway station	Passingford Bridge	Arriva London	Partially replaced commercial routes 500 and 575. Does not operate on Sundays.
376	Beckton bus station	Newham Town Hall	Go-Ahead London	
377	Ponders End	Oakwood tube station	Arriva London	Does not operate on Sundays.
378	Mortlake	Putney Bridge tube station	Transport UK London Bus	
379	Chingford railway station	Yardley Lane Estate	Stagecoach London	Crosses border into Essex in Gilwell Hill.
380	Lewisham Shopping Centre	Belmarsh Prison	Stagecoach London	
381	County Hall	Peckham	Transport UK London Bus	
382	Southgate tube station	Millbrook Park	Metroline	
383	The Spires Barnet	Finchley Memorial Hospital	Uno	Does not operate on Sundays.
384	Edgware bus station	Cockfosters tube station	Metroline	
385	Chingford railway station	Salisbury Hall	Stagecoach London	Does not operate on Sundays.
386	Blackheath Village	Woolwich	Go-Ahead London	
388	London Bridge bus station	Stratford City bus station	Stagecoach London	
389	The Spires Barnet	Barnet Playing Fields	Go-Ahead London	Does not operate on Sundays.
390	Victoria bus station	Archway tube station	Metroline	Operates as a 24-hour service.
393	Chalk Farm	Clapton Pond	Metroline	
394	Islington	Homerton University Hospital	Stagecoach London	
395	Harrow bus station	Greenford	First Bus London	
396	Ilford	King George Hospital	Go-Ahead London	
397	Salisbury Hall	Debden	Stagecoach London	
398	Ruislip tube station	Wood End	First Bus London	
399	The Spires Barnet	Hadley Wood railway station	Go-Ahead London	Does not operate on Sundays.

=== 400–499 ===
Route	Start	End	Operator	Notes
401	Bexleyheath town centre	Thamesmead	Go-Ahead London	
403	Warlingham	West Croydon bus station	Go-Ahead London	
404	Caterham on the Hill	Coulsdon	Transport UK London Bus	
405	Croydon town centre	Redhill railway station	Arriva London	
406	Epsom	Cromwell Road bus station	First Bus London	
407	Sutton	Caterham Valley	Transport UK London Bus	
410	Crystal Palace bus station	Wallington	Arriva London	Frequency reduced from a bus every 9 minutes to a bus every 10 minutes on 30 June 2018.
411	Cromwell Road bus station	West Molesey	First Bus London	
412	Croydon town centre	Purley	Arriva London	
413	Morden tube station	Sutton bus garage	Go-Ahead London	
415	Burgess Park	Tulse Hill railway station	Transport UK London Bus	
417	Crystal Palace bus station	Clapham Common	Arriva London	
418	Cromwell Road bus station	Epsom railway station	First Bus London	
419	Roehampton	Richmond bus station	First Bus London	
422	Bexleyheath town centre	North Greenwich bus station	Stagecoach London	
423	Heathrow Terminal 5	Hounslow bus station	First Bus London	
424	Putney Heath	Fulham	Go-Ahead London	Does not operate on Sundays.
425	Clapton	Ilford	Stagecoach London	
427	Southall	Uxbridge	Transport UK London Bus	
428	Erith	Bluewater Shopping Centre	Arriva London	
430	Victoria and Albert Museum	Roehampton	Go-Ahead London	
432	Anerley railway station	Brixton tube station	Arriva London	
433	Addington Village Interchange	Croydon town centre	Transport UK London Bus	Originally numbered T33 until autumn 2015.
434	Coulsdon	Caterham Valley	Go-Ahead London	
436	Battersea Park railway station	Lewisham Shopping Centre	Go-Ahead London	
439	Waddon Marsh tram stop	Whyteleafe South	Go-Ahead London	
440	Wembley	Christ Church, Turnham Green	First Bus London	
444	Turnpike Lane bus station	Chingford railway station	Go-Ahead London	
450	Lower Sydenham	West Croydon bus station	Go-Ahead London	
452	Vauxhall bus station	Notting Hill Gate tube station	First Bus London	
453	Marylebone	Deptford Bridge DLR station	Go-Ahead London	Operates as a 24-hour service.
456	North Middlesex University Hospital	Crews Hill	Go-Ahead London	
460	North Finchley bus station	Willesden bus garage	Metroline	
462	Ilford	Limes Farm Estate	Stagecoach London	
463	Pollards Hill	Coulsdon South railway station	Go-Ahead London	
464	Tatsfield	New Addington tram stop	Transport UK London Bus	
465	Cromwell Road bus station	Dorking	Transport UK London Bus	
466	Caterham on the Hill	Addington Village Interchange	Arriva London	
467	Hinchley Wood School‡ Hook	Epsom; Epsom Hospital‡	Falcon Buses	Does not operate on Sundays. ‡ One morning and one afternoon schoolday-only journey from Epsom. ‡ One morning and one afternoon schoolday-only journey from Hook.
468	Elephant and Castle	South Croydon	Arriva London	
469	Queen Elizabeth Hospital	Erith	Go-Ahead London	
470	Colliers Wood tube station	Sutton railway station	Go-Ahead London	Does not operate on Sundays.
473	Stratford bus station	North Woolwich	Go-Ahead London	
474	Canning Town	Manor Park railway station	Go-Ahead London	Operates as a 24-hour service.
476	Northumberland Park railway station	London King's Cross railway station	Go-Ahead London	
481	West Middlesex University Hospital	Cromwell Road bus station	Metroline	
482	Heathrow Terminal 5	Southall Town Hall	Transport UK London Bus	
483	Harrow bus station	Windmill Park	Metroline	
484	Camberwell Green	Lewisham station	Go-Ahead London	
485	Southside Wandsworth	Mortlake	Transport UK London Bus	
486	Bexleyheath town centre	North Greenwich bus station	Go-Ahead London	Operates as a 24-hour service.
487	Willesden Junction station	South Harrow tube station	Metroline	
488	Bromley-by-Bow	Dalston	Stagecoach London	
490	Pools on the Park	Heathrow Terminal 5	Transport UK London Bus	
491	North Middlesex University Hospital	Waltham Cross	Metroline	
492	Bluewater Shopping Centre	Sidcup railway station	Arriva London	
493	St George's Hospital	Richmond bus station	Transport UK London Bus	
496	Queen's Hospital	Harold Wood railway station	Stagecoach London	
498	Queen's Hospital	Brentwood	Stagecoach London	Introduced on 26 December 2005.
499	Gallows Corner	Heath Park Estate	Stagecoach London	

=== 600–699 ===
Route numbers from 600 to 699 are used for school routes, with the majority of them running one return journey on each weekday during peak times and during school term time.

Route	Start	End	Schools	Operator	Notes
601	Thamesmead	Wilmington Academy	Wilmington Academy	Go-Ahead London	
602	Thamesmead	Townley Grammar School	Townley Grammar School	Stagecoach London	
603	Swiss Cottage tube station	Muswell Hill	N/A	Metroline	
606	Queensbury tube station	The Totteridge Academy	The Totteridge Academy; Queen Elizabeth's School, Barnet	Metroline	
608	Gallows Corner	Shenfield High School	Shenfield High School	Go-Ahead London	
612	Wallington County Grammar School	Selsdon	Wallington County Grammar School; Riddlesdown Collegiate; The John Fisher School; Wallington High School for Girls	Arriva London	
613	Tolworth railway station	Glenthorne High School	Glenthorne High School	First Bus London	
616	Grange Park	Edmonton Green bus station	The Latymer School	Arriva London	
617	Turnpike Lane bus station	Turkey Street railway station	St Ignatius College	Metroline	
618	Ivybridge	Bolder Academy	Bolder Academy	Transport UK London Bus	Introduced on 2 September 2024.
621	Lewisham station	Stationers' Crown Woods Academy	Stationers' Crown Woods Academy	Stagecoach London	
624	Grove Park railway station	Stationers' Crown Woods Academy; Welling‡	Stationers' Crown Woods Academy	Go-Ahead London	‡ One bus eastbound only
625	Plumstead Common	Chislehurst	N/A	Go-Ahead London	
626	Finchley Central tube station	Dame Alice Owen's School	Dame Alice Owen's School	Metroline	
627	Wallington High School for Girls	Worcester Park railway station	Wallington High School for Girls	Arriva London	
628	JFS	Southgate tube station	JFS	Uno	Runs one way to Southgate tube station only.
629	Turkey Street railway station	Wood Green bus garage	St Ignatius College	Metroline	
631	Golders Green tube station	Henrietta Barnett School	Henrietta Barnett School	Metroline	
632	Grahame Park	Kilburn Park tube station	St James' Catholic High School	Metroline	
633	Pollards Hill	Coulsdon South railway station	Woodcote High School	Go-Ahead London	
634	Muswell Hill	Arkley	Queen Elizabeth's School, Barnet	Metroline	
635	St Paul's College	Hounslow bus station	St Paul's College	Metroline	
638	Kemnal Technology College	Coney Hall	Chislehurst School for Girls; Kemnal Technology College; Coopers School; Eltham College	Stagecoach London	
639	Roehampton	St John Bosco College	St John Bosco College	Transport UK London Bus	
640	South Harrow tube station	Bentley Wood High School	Whitmore High School; Salvatorian College; Sacred Heart Language College; Bentley Wood High School	Metroline	
642	West Hendon	London Academy	London Academy	Metroline	
643	Brent Cross bus station	Christ's College Finchley	Christ's College Finchley	Uno	
645	Waddon	Purley Cross	N/A	Transport UK London Bus	Introduced on 4 January 2022 to replace schoolday-only journeys on route 405.
646	Noak Hill	Cranham	Redden Court School; Havering College of Further and Higher Education; Havering Sixth Form College; Sacred Heart of Mary Girls' School; Coopers' Company and Coborn School; Hall Mead School	Go-Ahead London	
649	Romford bus garage	The Campion School	The Campion School	Stagecoach London	
650	Romford bus garage	Emerson Park Academy	Emerson Park Academy	Stagecoach London	
651	Romford railway station	Chase Cross	Bower Park Academy	Stagecoach London	
652	Rainham	Upminster station	Sanders Draper School; Havering Sixth Form College; The Brittons Academy; Harris Academy Rainham	Go-Ahead London	
653	JFS	Muswell Hill	JFS	Uno	
655	Mitcham	Raynes Park High School	Raynes Park High School	Transport UK London Bus	
656	Gallows Corner	Emerson Park Academy	Emerson Park Academy	Go-Ahead London	
657	Salisbury Hall	Bancroft's School	Trinity Catholic High School; Bancroft's School	Stagecoach London	
658	Woolwich Arsenal station	Stationers' Crown Woods Academy	Stationers' Crown Woods Academy	Go-Ahead London	
660	Stationers' Crown Woods Academy	Catford bus garage	Stationers' Crown Woods Academy	Stagecoach London	
661	Chislehurst	Petts Wood railway station	Eltham College; Coopers School	Stagecoach London	
662	Surbiton railway station	Holy Cross School	Holy Cross School	First Bus London	
663	St Giles School	Thornton Heath railway station	Harris Academy Purley	Arriva London	
664	New Addington	Charles Darwin School	Charles Darwin School; Ravens Wood School	Transport UK London Bus	
665	Surbiton	Holy Cross School	Holy Cross School	First Bus London	
667	Ilford	West Hatch High School	West Hatch High School	Stagecoach London	
669	Thamesmead	Cleeve Park School	Cleeve Park School	Stagecoach London	
670	Roehampton	St John Bosco College	St John Bosco College	Transport UK London Bus	
671	Chessington South railway station	Tiffin Girls' School	Tiffin Girls' School	First Bus London	
672	Hawksmoor School	Woolwich Arsenal station	Hawksmoor School	Stagecoach London	
674	Romford railway station	Harold Hill	Royal Liberty School	Stagecoach London	
675	St. James Street railway station	Woodbridge High School	Woodbridge High School	Arriva London	
677	Ilford	Debden	Davenant Foundation School	Go-Ahead London	
678	Beckton bus station	Stratford bus station	St Angela's Ursuline School; St Bonaventure's; Forest Gate Community School; Stratford School	Stagecoach London	Afternoon journeys to Beckton bus station start from Forest Gate.
679	Bancroft's School	Goodmayes	Woodford County High School For Girls; Trinity Catholic High School; Bancroft's School	Go-Ahead London	Morning journeys from Goodmayes terminate at St Thomas of Canterbury Church.
681	Hounslow bus station	Teddington School	Teddington School	First Bus London	
683	Friern Barnet	JFS	JFS	Uno	
684	Orpington railway station	Charles Darwin School	Charles Darwin School	Stagecoach London	
685	Warlingham School	Selsdon	Warlingham School; Riddlesdown Collegiate	Arriva London	Runs one way to Selsdon only.
686	St Edward's Church of England Academy	Harold Hill	St Edward's Church of England Academy	Go-Ahead London	Morning journeys to St Edward's Church of England Academy start from Romford railway station.
687	Dagenham East	Barking station	Dagenham Park Church of England School	Stagecoach London	
688	Southgate tube station	JFS	JFS	Uno	
689	West Croydon bus station	Monks Orchard	Orchard Park High School	Arriva London	
690	Burntwood School	Norwood bus garage	Burntwood School	Transport UK London Bus	
695	The Douay Martyrs School	Cherry Lane Primary School	The Douay Martyrs School; Cherry Lane Primary School	Metroline	
696	Hayes	Bishop Ramsey School	Bishop Ramsey School	First Bus London	
697	Hayes End	The Douay Martyrs School	The Douay Martyrs School	Metroline	
698	The Douay Martyrs School	Hayes	The Douay Martyrs School	Metroline	
699	Winchmore Hill	Dame Alice Owen's School	Dame Alice Owen's School	Uno	

=== 900–999 ===
Route numbers from 900 to 999 represent mobility buses; these mostly provide a once-a-week return journey to a local shopping centre from relatively low-density neighbourhoods where there is no alternative route in the main bus network. The number of mobility bus routes has declined over the past few years due to low-floor and wheelchair-accessible buses now running on all London Buses routes, as well as the increased capacity of the Dial-a-Ride service. As of 2026, there is only one mobility bus route in operation: route 969.

Route	Start	End	Operator	Notes
969	Whitton	Roehampton Vale	Transport UK London Bus	Operates one return journey on Tuesdays and Fridays only.

=== East London Transit routes (EL-prefixed) ===
Route	Start	End	Operator	Notes
EL1	Ilford railway station	Barking Riverside	Go-Ahead London	Operates as a 24-hour service. Originally numbered 369 until 20 February 2010.
EL2	Becontree Heath	Dagenham Dock railway station	Go-Ahead London	
EL3	Little Heath	Barking Riverside	Go-Ahead London	Originally numbered 387 until 18 February 2017. Two afternoon schoolday-only journeys extend to and from Northgate Road in Barking Riverside.

=== Superloop routes (BL- and SL-prefixed) ===
Route	Start	End	Operator	Notes
BL1	London Waterloo station	Lewisham Shopping Centre	Go-Ahead London	Interim route along the proposed route of the Bakerloo line extension.
SL1	North Finchley bus station	Walthamstow Central station	Arriva London	
SL2	Walthamstow bus station	North Woolwich	Arriva London	
SL3	Thamesmead	Bromley North railway station	Stagecoach London	
SL4	Grove Park	Westferry Circus	Go-Ahead London	
SL5	Bromley North railway station	Croydon town centre	Arriva London	
SL6	Russell Square	West Croydon bus station	Arriva London	Runs on weekdays during peak hours only.
SL7	West Croydon bus station	Heathrow Central bus station	Go-Ahead London	
SL8	Uxbridge tube station	White City bus station	Metroline	
SL9	Heathrow Central bus station	Harrow bus station	First Bus London	
SL10	Harrow bus station	North Finchley bus station	First Bus London	
SL11	North Greenwich bus station	Abbey Wood railway station	Go-Ahead London	
SL12	Gants Hill	Rainham	Stagecoach London	

=== Other letter-prefixed routes ===
Route	Start	End	Operator	Letter code	Notes
A10	Uxbridge tube station	Heathrow Central bus station	Metroline	Heathrow Airport	
B11	Bexleyheath bus garage	South Thamesmead	Go-Ahead London	Bexleyheath	
B12	Erith	Joyden's Wood	Go-Ahead London	Bexleyheath	
B13	Bexleyheath Central Library	New Eltham railway station	Go-Ahead London	Bexleyheath	
B14	Bexleyheath Central Library	Orpington railway station	Stagecoach London	Bexleyheath	
B15	Bexleyheath town centre	Horn Park	Go-Ahead London	Bexleyheath	
B16	Bexleyheath bus garage	Kidbrooke	Go-Ahead London	Bexleyheath	
C1	London Victoria station	White City bus station	First Bus London	Central London	
C3	Clapham Junction railway station	Earl's Court	Transport UK London Bus	Chelsea	
C10	London Victoria station	Canada Water bus station	Transport UK London Bus	Central London	
C11	Archway tube station	Brent Cross bus station	Metroline	Cricklewood	
D3	Bethnal Green	Leamouth	Go-Ahead London	London Docklands	
D6	Cambridge Heath	Cubitt Town	Stagecoach London	London Docklands	
D7	Mile End tube station	All Saints Church	Stagecoach London	London Docklands	
D8	Cubitt Town	Stratford bus station	Stagecoach London	London Docklands	
E1	Ealing Broadway station	Greenford Broadway	Metroline	Ealing	
E2	Brentford bus garage	Greenford Broadway	Metroline	Ealing	
E3	Chiswick	Greenford Broadway	First Bus London	Ealing	
E5	Perivale	Southall	Transport UK London Bus	Dormers Wells	
E6	Bulls Bridge	Greenford station	Transport UK London Bus	Yeading	
E7	Ealing Broadway station	Ruislip tube station	Transport UK London Bus	Ealing	
E8	Ealing Broadway station	Hounslow	Metroline	Ealing	
E9	Ealing Broadway station	Yeading	Metroline	Ealing	
E10	Ealing Broadway station	Northolt	Transport UK London Bus	Ealing	
E11	Ealing Common	Greenford Broadway	Transport UK London Bus	Ealing	
G1	Shaftesbury Park Estate	Norbury	Transport UK London Bus	St George's Hospital	
H2	Golders Green tube station	Circular route via Hampstead Garden Suburb	Metroline	Hampstead Garden Suburb	
H3	East Finchley	Golders Green tube station	Metroline	Hampstead Garden Suburb	
H9	Northwick Park Hospital	Anticlockwise via Kenton station and Harrow & Wealdstone station	First Bus London	Harrow	Circular routes. Routes H9 and H10 run alongside each other between Northwick Park Hospital and Northwick Park Roundabout.
H10	Northwick Park Hospital	Clockwise via Harrow bus station and South Harrow tube station	First Bus London	Harrow	Circular routes. Routes H9 and H10 run alongside each other between Northwick Park Hospital and Northwick Park Roundabout.
H11	Harrow bus station	Mount Vernon Hospital	First Bus London	Harrow	
H12	South Harrow tube station	Stanmore tube station	First Bus London	Hatch End	
H13	Northwood Hills	Ruislip Lido	Metroline	Ruislip	
H14	Northwick Park Hospital	Hatch End	First Bus London	Harrow	
H17	Harrow bus station	Wembley Central station	Metroline	Harrow	
H18	Harrow bus station	Clockwise via North Harrow and Headstone Lane railway station	First Bus London	Harrow	Circular route.
H19	Harrow bus station	Anticlockwise via Kenton station and Belmont	First Bus London	Harrow	Circular route. Route terminates at St George's Shopping Centre instead of Harrow bus station.
H20	Hounslow	Ivybridge	Transport UK London Bus	Hounslow	
H22	Hounslow	West Middlesex University Hospital	First Bus London	Hounslow	
H25	Hanworth	Hatton Cross tube station	Transport UK London Bus	Hatton	
H26	Feltham	Hatton Cross tube station	Transport UK London Bus	Hatton	
H28	Bulls Bridge	Osterley	Transport UK London Bus	Hounslow	
H32	Hounslow bus station	Southall Town Hall	Metroline	Hounslow	
H37	Richmond	Hounslow	First Bus London	Hounslow	
H91	Hammersmith bus station	Hounslow West tube station	Metroline	Hounslow	
H98	Hayes End	Hounslow bus station	First Bus London	Hounslow	
K1	Cromwell Road bus station	New Malden railway station	First Bus London	Kingston upon Thames	
K2	Kingston Hospital	Hook	First Bus London	Kingston upon Thames	
K3	Roehampton Vale	Esher	First Bus London	Kingston upon Thames	
K4	Mansfield Park Estate	Kingston Hospital	First Bus London	Kingston upon Thames	Does not operate on Sundays.
K5	Morden tube station	Ham	First Bus London	Kingston upon Thames	Does not operate on Sundays.
P4	Lewisham station	Brixton tube station	Go-Ahead London	Dulwich	
P5	Elephant and Castle	Patmore Estate	Transport UK London Bus	Clapham	
P12	Surrey Quays Shopping Centre	Brockley Rise	Go-Ahead London	Peckham	
P13	New Cross	Streatham railway station	Transport UK London Bus	Peckham	
R1	Green Street Green	St Paul's Cray	Go-Ahead London	Orpington	
R2	Orpington	Biggin Hill Valley	Go-Ahead London	Orpington	Does not operate on Sundays.
R3	Princess Royal University Hospital	Orpington railway station	Go-Ahead London	Orpington	
R4	Princess Royal University Hospital	Paul's Cray Hill	Go-Ahead London	Orpington	
R5	Orpington railway station	Clockwise via Pratt's Bottom and Knockholt	Go-Ahead London	Orpington	Circular route. Routes R5 and R10 run alongside each other between Orpington railway station and Green Street Green & between Knockholt and Halstead. Does not operate on Sundays.
R7	Chelsfield Village	Chislehurst	Go-Ahead London	Orpington	
R8	Orpington railway station	Biggin Hill	Go-Ahead London	Orpington	Does not operate on Sundays.
R9	Orpington railway station	Ramsden	Go-Ahead London	Orpington	
R10	Orpington railway station	Anticlockwise via Hazelwood and Cudham	Go-Ahead London	Orpington	Circular route. Routes R5 and R10 run alongside each other between Orpington railway station and Green Street Green & between Knockholt and Halstead. Does not operate on Sundays.
R11	Green Street Green	Queen Mary's Hospital	Go-Ahead London	Orpington	
R68	Hampton Court railway station	Kew	Transport UK London Bus	Richmond	
R70	Richmond	Hampton	Transport UK London Bus	Richmond	
S1	Lavender Fields	Banstead	Transport UK London Bus	Sutton	
S2	St Helier railway station	Epsom	Go-Ahead London	Sutton	
S3	Belmont railway station	Malden Manor railway station	Transport UK London Bus	Sutton	Does not operate on Sundays.
S4	Sutton	Waddon Marsh	Go-Ahead London	Sutton	
U1	Ruislip tube station	West Drayton railway station	Metroline	Uxbridge	
U2	Uxbridge tube station	Brunel University	Metroline	Uxbridge	Runs via Hillingdon tube station.
U3	Uxbridge tube station	Heathrow Central bus station	Metroline	Uxbridge	
U4	Uxbridge tube station	Hayes	Metroline	Uxbridge	
U5	Uxbridge	Hayes	Transport UK London Bus	Uxbridge	
U7	Uxbridge tube station	Hayes	Transport UK London Bus	Uxbridge	
U9	Uxbridge tube station	Harefield Hospital	Transport UK London Bus	Uxbridge	
U10	Uxbridge tube station	Ruislip	Metroline	Uxbridge	Does not operate on Sundays.
W3	Finsbury Park bus station	Northumberland Park railway station	Arriva London	Wood Green	
W4	Oakthorpe Park	Tottenham Hale	Arriva London	Wood Green	
W5	Archway tube station	Harringay	Stagecoach London	Crouch End	
W6	Southgate tube station	Edmonton Green bus station	Arriva London	Palmers Green	
W7	Finsbury Park bus station	Muswell Hill	Metroline	Crouch End	
W8	Lee Valley Leisure Complex	Chase Farm Hospital	Metroline	Enfield Town	
W9	Southgate tube station	Chase Farm Hospital	Metroline	Enfield Town	
W11	Walthamstow bus station	Chingford Hall Estate	Stagecoach London	Walthamstow	
W12	Walthamstow	Woodford Bridge	Stagecoach London	Walthamstow	
W13	Leyton Mills	St Thomas of Canterbury Church	Stagecoach London	Woodford	
W14	Whipps Cross	Loughton tube station	Stagecoach London	Woodford	
W15	Higham Hill	Hackney Town Hall	Go-Ahead London	Walthamstow	
W16	Leytonstone bus station	Chingford Mount	Stagecoach London	Highams Park	
W19	Walthamstow	Ilford	Stagecoach London	Walthamstow	

=== Silvertown Tunnel cycle shuttle ===
Route	Start	End	Operator	Notes
SCS	Greenwich Peninsula	Royal Victoria DLR station	Stagecoach London	Only to be used by cyclists.

=== Night Bus routes (N-prefixed) ===
Night Bus routes are often related to the day numerical equivalent, normally running the same route but with an extension at either end of the service. This is normally to provide a night service to destinations served by tube or train during the day.

However, there are a few N-prefixed route numbers that have no relation to their daytime equivalents: the N5, N20, and N97 all operate in a different part of London to their respective day routes. Also, the N118 (which runs partially alongside route N18), N472 (whose daytime service was withdrawn in January 2026), N550 and N551 (which provide night service on parts of the DLR network) have no corresponding daytime routes.

There are also 24-hour routes, which run day and night but usually with a lower frequency during the night hours. The vast majority run the same route at all times. With the introduction of the Night Tube, some day routes have been extended to run during Friday and Saturday nights to serve the stations.

Route	Start	End	Operator
N1	Thamesmead	Tottenham Court Road station	Go-Ahead London
N2	Crystal Palace bus station	Marylebone station	Arriva London
N3	Oxford Circus tube station	Bromley North railway station	Transport UK London Bus
N5	Edgware bus station	Trafalgar Square	First Bus London
N7	Northolt tube station	Marble Arch tube station	Metroline
N8	Hainault	Oxford Circus tube station	Stagecoach London
N9	Heathrow Terminal 5	Aldwych	Metroline
N11	Ealing Broadway station	Whitehall	Go-Ahead London
N15	Oxford Circus tube station	Romford Market	Go-Ahead London
N18	Harrow Weald bus garage	Trafalgar Square	First Bus London
N19	Clapham Junction railway station	Finsbury Park bus station	Arriva London
N20	Barnet Hospital	Trafalgar Square	Metroline
N21	Trafalgar Square	Bexleyheath town centre	Go-Ahead London
N22	Oxford Circus tube station	Fulwell	Go-Ahead London
N25	Ilford	Oxford Circus tube station	Stagecoach London
N26	Chingford railway station	London Victoria station	Stagecoach London
N27	Camden Market	Hammersmith bus station	Transport UK London Bus
N28	Southside Wandsworth	Camden Town tube station	Metroline
N29	Enfield Town	Trafalgar Square	Arriva London
N31	Clapham Junction railway station	Camden Town tube station	First Bus London
N32	Edgware bus station	London Victoria station	Metroline
N33	Fulwell railway station	Hammersmith bus station	First Bus London
N38	Walthamstow bus station	Victoria bus station	Arriva London
N41	Tottenham Hale bus station	Trafalgar Square	Arriva London
N44	Sutton railway station	Aldwych	Go-Ahead London
N53	Whitehall	Plumstead railway station	Stagecoach London
N55	St Thomas of Canterbury Church	Oxford Circus tube station	Stagecoach London
N63	Crystal Palace	London King's Cross railway station	Transport UK London Bus
N65	Chessington World of Adventures	Ealing Broadway station	First Bus London
N68	Old Coulsdon	Tottenham Court Road	Transport UK London Bus
N72	East Acton	Roehampton	First Bus London
N73	Walthamstow bus station	Oxford Circus tube station	Arriva London
N74	Roehampton	Baker Street tube station	Go-Ahead London
N83	Ealing Hospital	Golders Green tube station	Metroline
N86	Harold Hill	Stratford bus station	Stagecoach London
N87	Fairfield bus station	Aldwych	Go-Ahead London
N89	Trafalgar Square	Erith	Go-Ahead London
N91	Cockfosters tube station	Trafalgar Square	Go-Ahead London
N97	Hammersmith bus station	Trafalgar Square	Go-Ahead London
N98	Stanmore tube station	Red Lion Square	Metroline
N109	Oxford Circus tube station	Croydon town centre	Transport UK London Bus
N113	Edgware bus station	Marble Arch tube station	Metroline
N118	Ruislip tube station	Trafalgar Square	First Bus London
N133	Morden tube station	Liverpool Street bus station	Transport UK London Bus
N136	Oxford Circus tube station	Chislehurst	Go-Ahead London
N137	Crystal Palace bus station	Marble Arch tube station	Arriva London
N140	Harrow Weald bus garage	Heathrow Central bus station	Metroline
N155	Morden tube station	Aldwych	Go-Ahead London
N171	Hither Green railway station	Tottenham Court Road station	Go-Ahead London
N199	St Mary Cray railway station	Trafalgar Square	Stagecoach London
N205	Leyton	London Paddington station	Stagecoach London
N207	Uxbridge tube station	Bloomsbury Square	Transport UK London Bus
N242	Homerton University Hospital	Tottenham Court Road	Stagecoach London
N250	Fairfield Halls	Brixton tube station	Arriva London
N253	Tottenham Court Road station	Aldgate tube station	Arriva London
N263	North Finchley bus station	Finsbury Square	Metroline
N266	Brent Cross bus station	Hammersmith bus station	Metroline
N277	Cubitt Town	Islington	Stagecoach London
N279	Waltham Cross	Trafalgar Square	Arriva London
N343	New Cross bus garage	Trafalgar Square	Go-Ahead London
N381	Peckham	Whitehall	Transport UK London Bus
N472	North Greenwich bus station	Abbey Wood railway station	Go-Ahead London
N550	Canning Town bus station	Trafalgar Square	Stagecoach London
N551	Gallions Reach Shopping Park	Trafalgar Square	Stagecoach London

== Non-TfL bus routes in Greater London ==
These bus routes are not contracted to Transport for London and are therefore not London Buses. Most run from villages and towns outside Greater London to destinations within. They are painted in a colour chosen by the operator so may not be red like London Buses and do not accept Oyster cards. These routes are operated with a London Service Permit issued by TfL so appear on TfL bus stops and are recognised on TfL bus maps.

Route	Start	End	Operator	Source	Notes
3	Orpington	Sevenoaks	GoBus		
3	Slough	Uxbridge tube station	First Berkshire & The Thames Valley		
5	Cippenham	Heathrow Terminal 5	Thames Valley Buses		
7	Britwell	Heathrow Terminal 5	First Berkshire & The Thames Valley		Certain journeys extend to and from Heathrow Central bus station.
8	Slough	Heathrow Terminal 5	First Berkshire & The Thames Valley		
101	Amersham station	Uxbridge	Carousel Buses		
102	High Wycombe	Heathrow Central bus station	Carousel Buses		
104	High Wycombe	Uxbridge	Carousel Buses		
243	Barnet Hospital	Hatfield	Uno		
269	Brentwood	Grays	NIBS Buses		Crosses border into Greater London in North Ockendon. Route does not operate with a London Service Permit.
328	Mount Vernon Hospital	Watford	Red Rose Travel		
346	Mount Vernon Hospital	Watford	Red Rose Travel		
355	Carterhatch	Nicholas Breakspear School	Sullivan Buses		
356	Bush Hill Park	Nicholas Breakspear School	Sullivan Buses		
397A	Salisbury Hall	Debden	Central Connect		Limited service of one evening return journey on weekdays only, running the same route as London Buses route 397.
409	East Grinstead	Selsdon	Metrobus		
411	Reigate	Selsdon	Metrobus		Limited service of one journey per day to Selsdon, all other journeys terminate at Warlingham or Chelsham.
420	Sutton bus garage	Crawley	Metrobus		
429	West Kingsdown	Dartford	GoBus		Crosses border into Greater London in Coldblow.
442	Heathrow Terminal 5	Staines-upon-Thames	Carlone Limited		Limited early morning and late evening buses extend to and from Englefield Green. Special journeys serve sections in Stanwell and Stanwell Moor, the Royal Estate, located south of Staines-upon-Thames and extend to and from Heathrow Central bus station.
446	Hatton Cross tube station	Woking railway station	White Bus Services		
458	Slough	Uxbridge tube station	Carousel Buses		
458	Cromwell Road bus station	Staines-upon-Thames	White Bus Services		
461	Cromwell Road bus station	St Peter's Hospital	Falcon Buses		
477	Orpington	Dartford	Kent Country		
513	Cromwell Road bus station	Downside	Reptons Coaches		
514	Cromwell Road bus station	Weybridge	Falcon Buses		
515	Cromwell Road bus station	Weybridge	Falcon Buses		
555	Hatton Cross tube station	Walton-on-Thames	White Bus Services		
581	Uxbridge	Higher Denham	Carousel Buses		
583	Uxbridge	Hedgerley	Carousel Buses		
614	Queensbury tube station	Hatfield railway station	Uno		
644	Queensbury tube station	Hatfield railway station	Uno		
668	North Cheam	St Andrew's Catholic School	Go-Ahead London		
695	Oxted School	Westerham	Metrobus		Crosses border into Greater London in Biggin Hill.
702	Legoland Windsor Resort	Green Line Coach Station	Reading Buses		
703	Bracknell bus station	Heathrow Terminal 5	Thames Valley Buses		
704	Maidenhead	Heathrow Terminal 5	Thames Valley Buses		
714	Cromwell Road bus station	RHS Garden Wisley	Falcon Buses		
715	Cromwell Road bus station	Guildford	Falcon Buses		
724	Harlow	Heathrow Central bus station	Arriva Herts & Essex		
725	Stevenage	Heathrow Central bus station	Arriva Herts & Essex		
820	Sutton bus garage	Redhill	Metrobus		
866	Coulsdon	The Beacon School	Metrobus		
A4	Cippenham	Heathrow Central bus station	First Berkshire & The Thames Valley		
B1	Harold Wood railway station	Basildon	First Essex		
A60	Iver	Heathrow Central bus station	Diamond South East		Night-only route.
D29	Crockenhill	Dartford Grammar School for Girls	GoBus		Crosses border into Greater London in Coldblow.
E16	Epsom	Worcester Park railway station	Falcon Buses		
M40	High Wycombe	Uxbridge tube station	First Berkshire & The Thames Valley		
N30	Heathrow Central bus station	Acton	Diamond South East		Night-only route.
N555	Heathrow Central bus station	Walton-on-Thames	Diamond South East		Night-only route.
R1	Maple Cross	Mount Vernon Hospital	Red Eagle		
R2	Chorleywood	Mount Vernon Hospital	Red Eagle		Limited Tuesday and Friday journeys extend to and from Watford.
R17	Carpenders Park railway station	Harrow Arts Centre	Red Eagle		Only runs on Wednesdays.
S3	Orpington	Trinity School	GoBus		
S32	Kemnal Technology College	Trinity School	GoBus		
X74	High Wycombe	Uxbridge tube station	First Berkshire & The Thames Valley		
X442	Heathrow Terminal 5	Staines-upon-Thames	Carlone Limited		Limited stop version of route 442, but avoids Ashford Hospital, as well as sections in Stanwell and Stanwell Moor. Also serves the Royal Estate, located south of Staines-upon-Thames.

== Former routes ==
Route	Start	End	Withdrawal date(s)	Notes
9H	Kensington High Street	Trafalgar Square	25 July 2014	Heritage route that used AEC Routemaster buses.
10	Hammersmith bus station	London King's Cross railway station	24 November 2018	Partially replaced by route 23.
15H	Tower Hill tube station	Charing Cross tube station	14 November 2020	Heritage route that used AEC Routemaster buses.
48	London Bridge bus station	Walthamstow bus station	12 October 2019	Replaced by routes 26, 55 and 388.
77A	Aldwych	Wandsworth	3 June 2006	Renumbered 87.
82	North Finchley bus station	Victoria bus station	1 April 2017	Replaced by route 13.
87	Barking	Romford Market	25 March 2006	
118	Brixton tube station	Morden tube station	1 February 2025	Replaced by route 45.
129	Claybury Broadway	Becontree Heath	26 June 2004	
168	Burgess Park	Hampstead Heath	30 September 2023	Replaced by route 1.
239	Clapham Junction	London Victoria station	16 February 2008	
271	Highgate Village	Finsbury Square	4 February 2023	Replaced by routes 21, 263 and N271.
283	East Acton	Hammersmith bus station	13 December 2025	Replaced by routes 72 and N72.
305	Edgware bus station	Kingsbury	1 September 2018	Replaced by route 303.
332	Brent Park	London Paddington station	29 April 2023	Replaced by route 16.
347	Romford railway station	Ockendon railway station	18 January 2025	Partially replaced by an extension of route 346.
349	Ponders End	Stamford Hill	5 September 2026	Replaced by routes 259 and 279.
351	Bromley North railway station	Penge	24 June 2002	
369	Ilford	Thames View Estate	20 February 2010	Replaced by new routes EL1 and EL2.
374	Romford railway station	Harold Hill	14 October 2005	
387	Little Heath	Barking Riverside	18 February 2017	Renumbered EL3.
391	Richmond bus station	Hammersmith bus station	12 December 2020	Replaced by route 110.
414	Putney Bridge tube station	Marble Arch tube station	22 February 2025	Replaced by a frequency increase on route 14.
455	Purley	Wallington railway station	2 March 2024	Replaced by routes 166, 312 and S4.
472	North Greenwich bus station	Abbey Wood railway station	24 January 2026	Replaced by route SL11, and night service renumbered N472.
497	Harold Hill	Harold Wood railway station	9 March 2024	Replaced by an extension of route 346.
507	London Waterloo station	Victoria bus station	29 April 2023	Replaced by routes 3, 11 and C10.
521	London Bridge bus station	London Waterloo station	29 April 2023	Replaced by routes 59 and 133.
530	Holloway	Angel tube station	29 October 2017	Ran one way to Angel tube station only.
533	Hammersmith bus station	Castelnau	15 August 2026	A temporary route introduced in 2019 due to a long-term closure of Hammersmith Bridge. Replaced by route 209.
541	Prince Regent DLR station	Keir Hardie Estate	1 June 2012; 31 March 2013; 30 October 2015; 19 February 2016	A temporary route introduced on 3 May 2011, 1 October 2012, 14 September 2013 and 15 February 2016 and operated by Stagecoach London (3 May 2011 until 1 June 2012 and 1 October 2012 until 31 March 2013) and Go-Ahead London (14 September 2013 until 30 October 2015 and 15 February 2015 until 19 February 2016). Created multiple times due to a temporary withdrawal of route 241 between Canning Town bus station and Prince Regent DLR station.
546	Keston	Downe	20 December 2024	
549	Loughton tube station	South Woodford tube station	7 September 2024	Replaced by a restructured version of route W14.
558	Seven Sisters station	Chingford Mount	28 August 2015	A temporary route introduced on 10 August 2015 and operated by Metroline. Created due to a closure of the Victoria line between Seven Sisters and Walthamstow Central stations.
588	Hackney Wick	Stratford City bus station	14 December 2013	A temporary route introduced on 13 July 2013 and operated by Stagecoach London. Was the first bus route to operate through the Queen Elizabeth Olympic Park.
592	Sidcup railway station	North Cray	3 September 2026	A temporary route introduced on 15 August 2026 to temporarily partially replace route 492 due to a road closure in North Cray.
605	Burnt Oak tube station	Totteridge & Whetstone tube station	24 July 2025	
607	Uxbridge tube station	White City bus station	15 July 2023	Renumbered SL8.
609	Hammersmith bus station	Mortlake	18 May 2019	Afternoon journeys to Hammersmith bus station started from The Harrodian School.
611	Stonebridge Park station	Christ's College Finchley	18 July 2020	Partially replaced by route 112.
618	Mill Hill Broadway railway station	Avanti House Secondary School	3 April 2018	
619	Edgware bus station	Avanti House Secondary School	3 April 2018	
636	Kemnal Technology College	Grove Park	2 September 2017	Ran one way to Grove Park only.
637	Kemnal Technology College	Grove Park	2 September 2017	Ran one way to Grove Park only.
641	West Molesey	Teddington School	30 September 2017	
647	Romford railway station	Drapers' Academy	5 September 2016	Replaced by route 496.
648	Romford railway station	Cranham	24 July 2021	Replaced by route 248 and partially replaced by route 646.
654	Addington Village Interchange	Ramsden	24 July 2025	
673	The Warren School	Beckton bus station	24 July 2025	Ran one way to Beckton bus station only.
689	Norwood bus garage	Burntwood School	30 July 2011	Replaced by route 690.
692	Dame Alice Owen's School	Southgate tube station	2 September 2023	Ran one way to Southgate tube station only.
700	Colliers Wood tube station	Mitcham	14 September 2025	A temporary route introduced on 14 July 2025 and operated by Go-Ahead London. Created to temporarily partially replace route 200 due to a road closure in Mitcham.
718	Morden tube station	Rosehill	5 December 2021	A temporary route introduced on 30 November 2019 and operated by Go-Ahead London. Created due to a closure of Bishopsford Road Bridge.
728	Fulham Town Hall	Southside Wandsworth	2 October 2023	A temporary route introduced on 24 July 2023 and operated by Abellio London. Created due to a closure of Wandsworth Bridge.
733	Oval tube station	Finsbury Square	13 May 2022	A temporary route introduced on 15 January 2022 and operated by Tower Transit. Created due to a closure of the Northern line between Moorgate and Oval stations.
931	Crystal Palace	Lewisham Shopping Centre	19 May 2017	Operated one return journey on Fridays. Replaced by local routes in the area and the Dial-a-Ride service.
953	Scrattons Eco Park	Romford	7 November 2012	Operated two return journeys on Wednesdays. Replaced by local routes in the area and the Dial-a-Ride service.
965	Riverhill	Kingston upon Thames	12 October 2018	Operated one return journey on Mondays, Wednesdays and Fridays only. Replaced by the Dial-a-Ride service. Crossed border into Surrey at Tolworth Court Farm Fields.
C2	Parliament Hill Fields	Regent Street	30 March 2019	Replaced by route 88.
H23	Hounslow bus station	Heathrow Airport	21 March 2008	
H50	West Drayton railway station	Hayes & Harlington railway station	21 March 2008	
PR1	Willesden Junction station	Ealing Broadway station	23 March 2007	
PR2	Willesden Junction station	Wembley Park	14 October 2011	
R6	Orpington railway station	St Mary Cray railway station	29 March 2025	Replaced by route B14.
RV1	Covent Garden	Tower Gateway DLR station	15 June 2019	Partially replaced by route 343.
S2	Stratford bus station	Clapton	5 July 2008	
S5	Wallington	Mitcham Common	1 March 2002	
T31	New Addington	Forestdale	24 October 2015	Replaced by changes to routes 64, 130 and 353.
T32	New Addington tram stop	Addington Village Interchange	24 October 2015	Replaced by changes to routes 64 and 130.
T33	West Croydon bus station	Addington Village Interchange	24 October 2015	Renumbered 433.
W10	Crews Hill	Enfield Town	13 March 2021	Replaced by route 456.
N10	Richmond	London King's Cross railway station	29 January 2010	
N13	North Finchley bus station	Aldwych	1 April 2017	Replaced by a 24-hour service on route 13.
N16	Edgware bus station	London Victoria station	29 April 2023	Renumbered N32.
N35	Clapham Junction railway station	Tottenham Court Road station	30 April 2016	
N36	Queen's Park station	Grove Park railway station	9 February 2008	
N47	Trafalgar Square	St Mary Cray railway station	12 September 2015	
N64	New Addington	Thornton Heath Pond	24 October 2015	
N76	Northumberland Park railway station	Lower Marsh	8 November 2014	
N93	Putney Bridge tube station	North Cheam	3 April 2004	
N159	Marble Arch tube station	New Addington	27 August 2010	
N271	North Finchley bus station	Finsbury Square	5 April 2025	Renumbered N263.
X26	West Croydon bus station	Heathrow Central bus station	19 August 2023	Renumbered SL7.
X68	Russell Square	West Croydon bus station	31 July 2023	Renumbered SL6.
X140	Heathrow Central bus station	Harrow bus station	26 August 2023	Renumbered SL9.

== Future routes ==
Route	Start	End	Notes
SL14	Stratford bus station	Chingford Hatch	To be introduced in 2027 as part of the Superloop express bus network.
SL15	Clapham Junction railway station	Eltham railway station	To be introduced in 2027 as part of the Superloop express bus network.

== Temporary routes ==
All routes operate in both directions unless stated.

Route	Start	End	Operator	Notes
7X	East Acton	London Paddington station	Metroline	Runs annually during the Notting Hill Carnival weekend.
18X	Warren Street tube station	Stonebridge Park station	First Bus London	Runs annually during the Notting Hill Carnival weekend.
23X	Victoria bus station	Harrow Road	First Bus London	Runs annually during the Notting Hill Carnival weekend.
36X	Peckham	Harrow Road	Go-Ahead London	Runs annually during the Notting Hill Carnival weekend. Runs one way to Harrow Road only.
148X	Vauxhall bus station	Shepherd's Bush tube station	First Bus London	Runs annually during the Notting Hill Carnival weekend.

== See also ==
- Category: London bus operators

== Bibliography ==
- Carr, Ken, The London Bus Guide. Boreham: Visions International Entertainment, 2011. ISBN 978-0-9570058-0-8.
