= London Buses route 347 =

Former London bus route

347
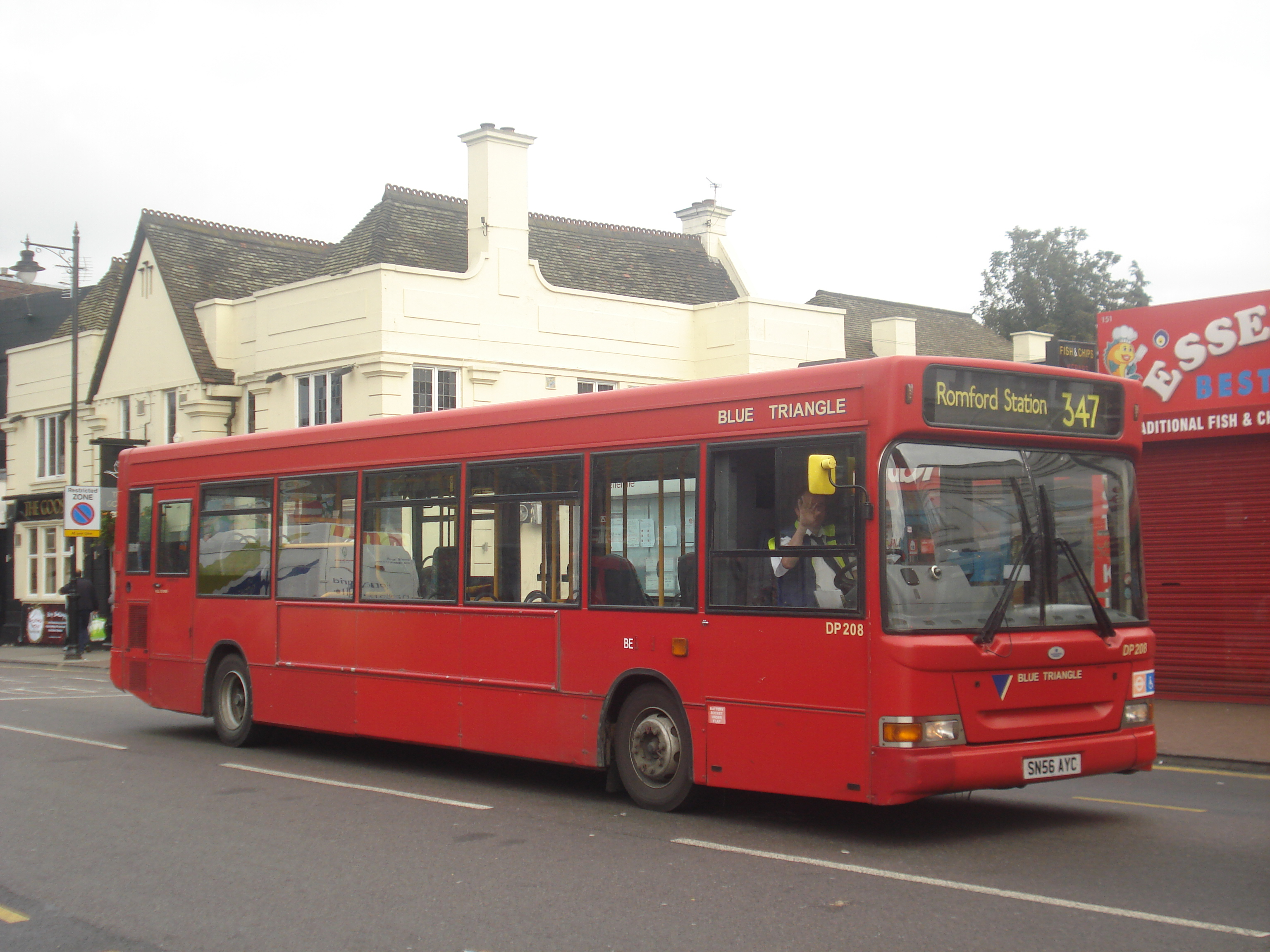
- Blue Triangle Plaxton Pointer at Romford station in October 2013

Overview
- Operator: Arriva London
- Garage: Grays
- Vehicle: Alexander Dennis Enviro200 Dart
- Peak vehicle requirement: 1
- Status: Defunct
- Began service: 6 November 2004
- Ended service: 18 January 2025
- Night-time: No night service

Route
- Start: Romford station
- Via: Gallows Corner; Harold Wood; Upminster; Cranham; North Ockendon
- End: Ockendon station
- Length: 12 miles (19 km)

Service
- Level: Monday to Saturday
- Frequency: Every 120 minutes
- Journey time: 42-47 minutes
- Operates: 09:00 until 16:50

London Buses route 347 was a Transport for London contracted bus route in London and Essex, England. It ran between Romford and Ockendon stations, and was last operated by Arriva London.

== History ==
On 15 October 2005, the contract for the route passed from First London to Blue Triangle. The route was retained by Blue Triangle on 16 October 2010.

On 17 October 2015, the route passed to Arriva Kent Thameside before transferring to Arriva London in January 2016 following a restructure of bus operations by Arriva.

In March 2023, Transport for London launched a public consultation on proposals to withdraw the route, being partially replaced by an extension of route 497. In January 2024, it was confirmed that the route would not be withdrawn, instead continuing to operate under review.

In December 2024, following the extension of route 346 and further review, it was confirmed that the route would be withdrawn. Route 347 was withdrawn on 18 January 2025. The route was partially replaced by the extension of route 346 between Harold Wood and Cranham, route 370 between Romford Station and West Road in South Ockendon, route 174 and route 498 between Romford Station and Gallows Corner as well as Essex commercial service 269 between Clay Tye Road and Ockendon Station.

== Former route ==
Route 347 operated via these primary locations:

- Romford station
- Gallows Corner
- Harold Wood station
- Upminster station
- Cranham
- North Ockendon
- South Ockendon
- Ockendon station

== Frequency ==
The route was notable for being the least frequent regular bus route in London (excluding school and mobility routes). The route operated four journeys in each direction every two hours on weekdays and Saturdays only with no Sunday service.
