= Liverpool Street =

Liverpool Street can refer to:

- Liverpool Street station, a major mainline railway station in Central London, UK
- Liverpool Street bus station, located adjacent to the London railway station
- Liverpool Street station, a station on the underground London Post Office Railway
- Liverpool Street, Hobart, a major street in Hobart, Australia
- Liverpool Street, Sydney, an important thoroughfare in the central business district of Sydney, Australia
- Liverpool Street, one of the streets named for European cities in the Zona Rosa, Mexico City
