= Finsbury Park bus station =

Bus station in Islington, London, England

Coordinates: 51°33′53″N 0°06′27″W

Finsbury Park Interchange
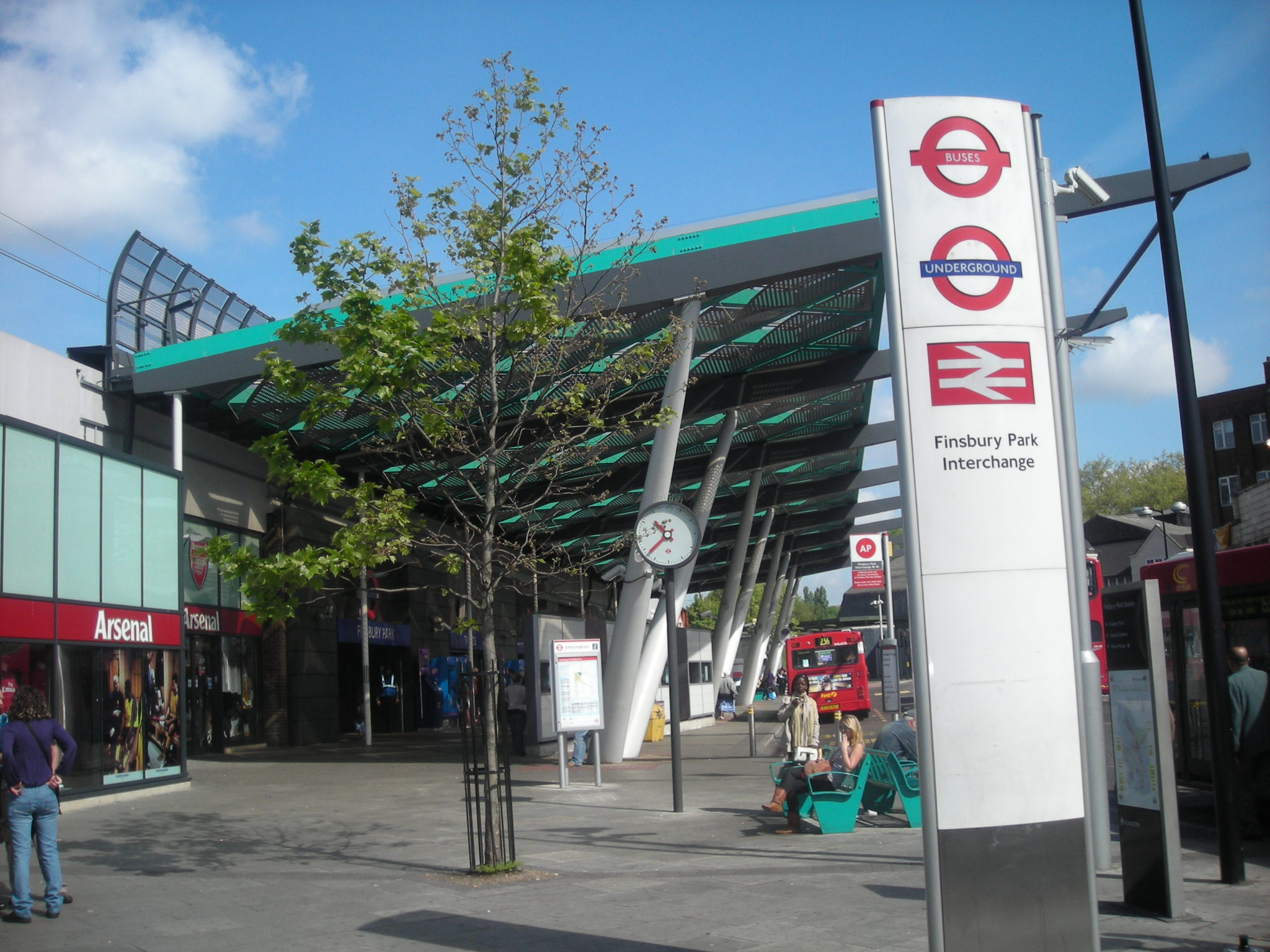
- The bus station in 2009

General information
- Location: Finsbury Park; Islington
- Operator: Transport for London
- Bus stands: 6
- Bus operators: Stagecoach London; Arriva London; Metroline; London General
- Connections: Finsbury Park station

Other information
- Fare zone: 2
Location

Finsbury Park Bus Station is a bus station in Finsbury Park, in Islington, London, England, served by several local bus routes. The bus station is next to Finsbury Park London Underground, Thameslink and National Rail station, collectively called Finsbury Park Interchange.

== Layout ==
The bus station has two parts:

Wells Terrace, at the north of the station complex (stops A, B and C) for routes 210, W3 and W7.

There is also Temporary stop D but used only when the Bus Station is closed.

Station Place, to the east (stops G, H and rail replacement services) for routes 4, 19, 106, 153, 236 and N19 including Railway Replacement Buses.

The bus station has six stands in total. The main operators at the bus station include Stagecoach London, Arriva London, Metroline and Go Ahead London

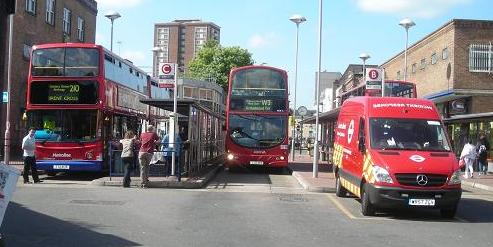
Finsbury Park Wells Terrace Bus Station

== See also ==
- List of bus and coach stations in London
