= London Buses route 153 =

London bus route

153
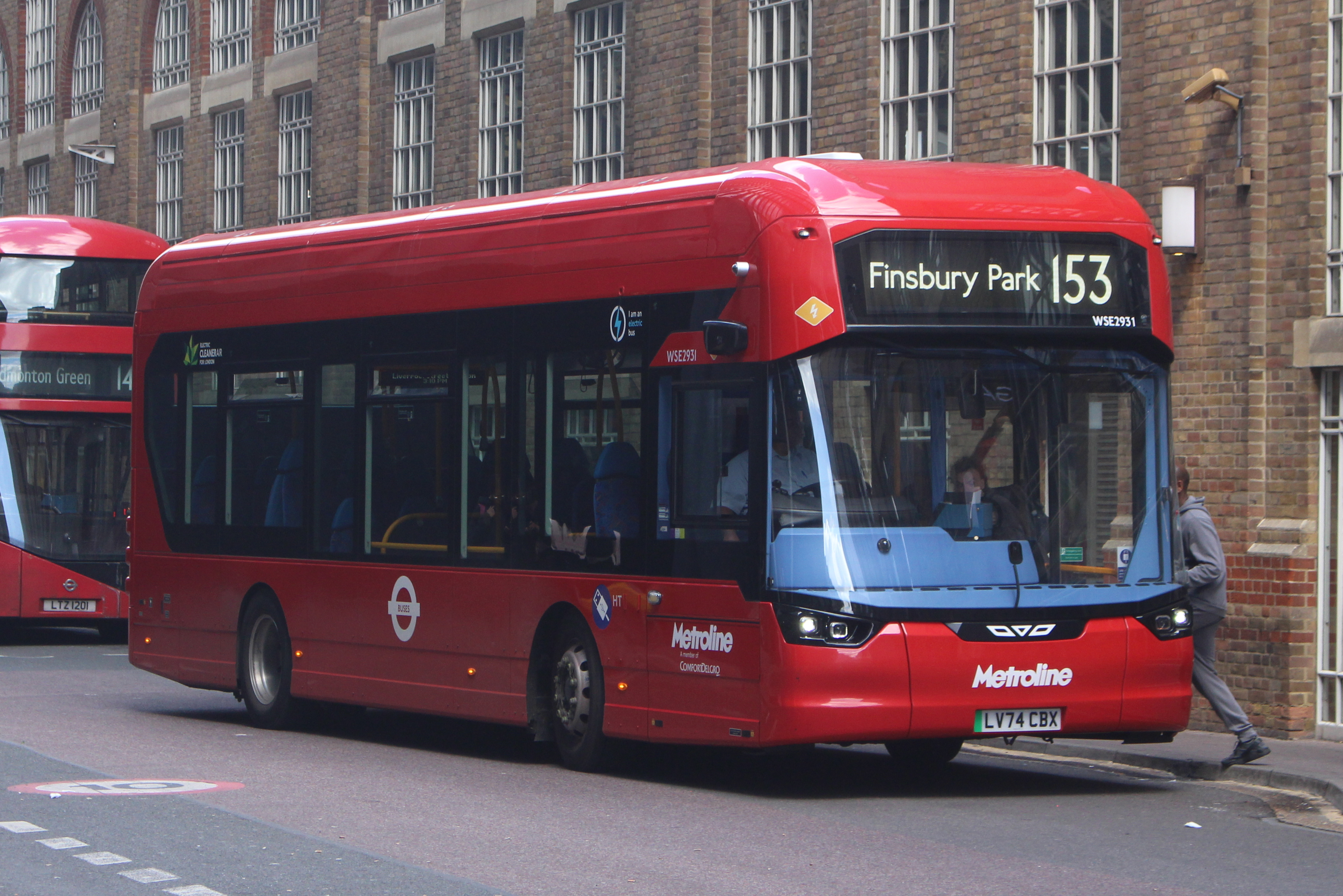
- Metroline Wright GB Kite Electroliner at Liverpool Street bus station in May 2025

Overview
- Operator: Metroline
- Garage: Holloway
- Vehicle: Wright GB Kite Electroliner
- Peak vehicle requirement: 9
- Night-time: No night service

Route
- Start: Finsbury Park bus station
- Via: Holloway; Barnsbury; Islington; Barbican
- End: Liverpool Street bus station
- Length: 6 miles (9.7 km)

Service
- Level: Daily
- Frequency: Around every 12-20 minutes
- Journey time: 25-52 minutes
- Operates: 04:55 until 00:44

London Buses route 153 is a Transport for London contracted bus route in London, England. Running between Finsbury Park and Liverpool Street bus stations, it is operated by Metroline.

== History ==
In July 2017, it was announced that the route would be entirely operated by electric buses by 2019.

From 5 December 2020, the route was extended from Finsbury Square to Liverpool Street station.

In February 2018, the route finally became entirely operated by electric buses following the deployment of 11 BYD Alexander Dennis Enviro200EV bodied single-decker. Around this time, the route also transferred from HCT Group to Go-Ahead London.

On 1 February 2025, the contract for the route passed from Go-Ahead London to Metroline from Holloway bus garage using new Wright GB Kite Electroliners.

== Current route ==
Route 153 operates via these primary locations:

- Finsbury Park bus station
- Finsbury Park station
- Holloway Road station
- Barnsbury
- Islington Angel
- Clerkenwell
- Barbican station
- Moorgate station
- Liverpool Street bus station for Liverpool Street station

== Operation ==
The route is operated from Metroline's Holloway bus garage, which has multiple charging points fitted to accommodate the electric buses for this route and various other routes operated from the garage. It operates with a frequency of 5 buses per hour during the day and 3 buses per hour during the evening.
