= London Buses route 497 =

Former London bus route

497
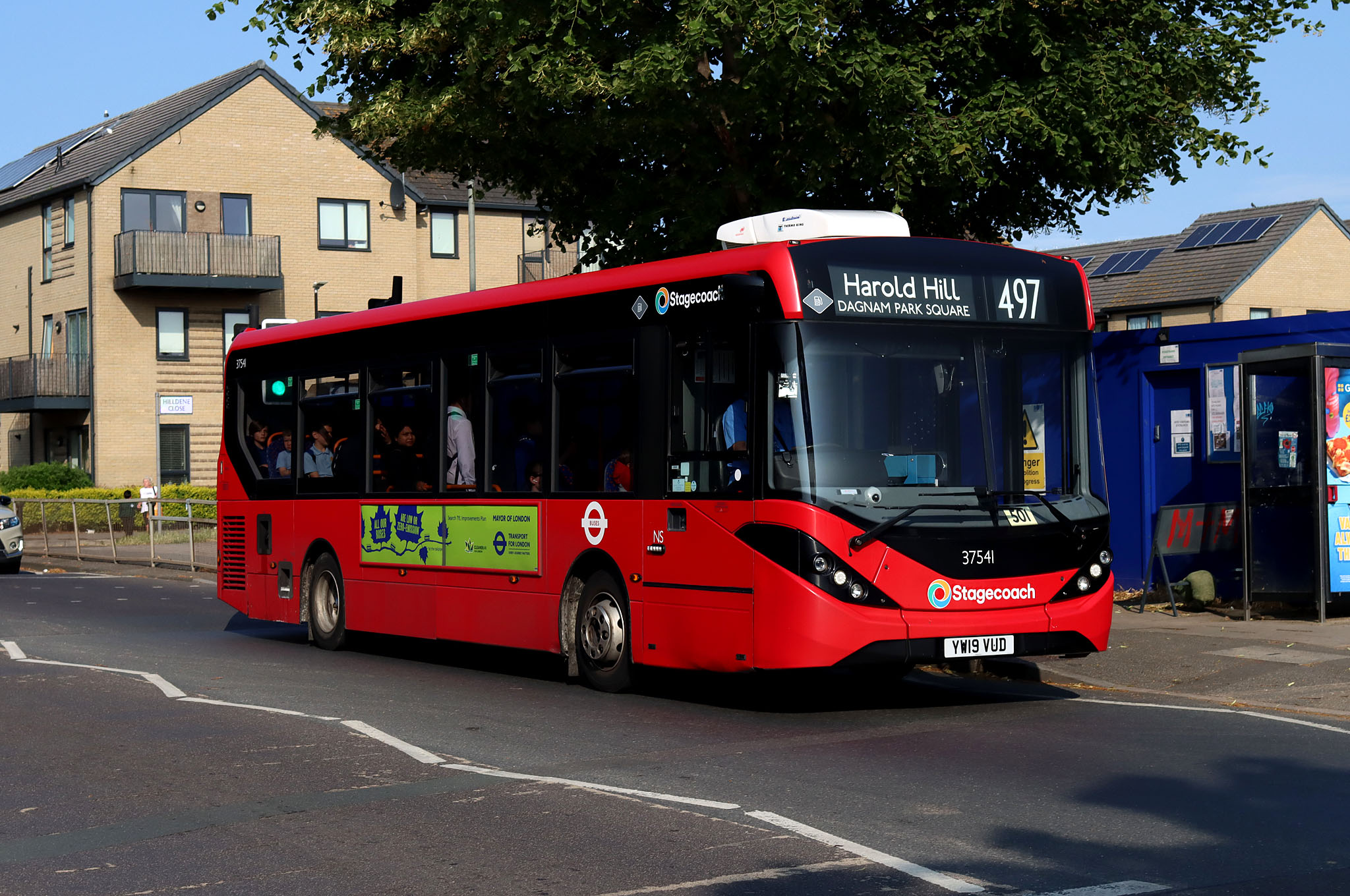
- East London Alexander Dennis Enviro200 MMC in Harold Hill in July 2023

Overview
- Operator: East London (Stagecoach London)
- Garage: Romford
- Vehicle: Alexander Dennis Enviro200 MMC
- Peak vehicle requirement: 2
- Status: Defunct
- Began service: 25 January 2020
- Ended service: 9 March 2024
- Night-time: No night service

Route
- Start: Harold Hill
- Via: Gallows Corner
- End: Harold Wood station
- Length: 3 miles (4.8 km)

Service
- Level: Monday to Saturday
- Frequency: About every 30-60 minutes
- Journey time: 18 minutes
- Operates: 05:40 until 00:18

London Buses route 497 was a Transport for London contracted bus route in London, England. It ran between Harold Hill and Harold Wood station, and was operated by Stagecoach London subsidiary East London.

== History ==
The route was first proposed in a review by Transport for London published in September 2016. A two-month consultation was held in 2017. It had been expected to start service in May 2019, however it was delayed. It began service on 25 January 2020. A review found that passenger numbers were insufficient for the route to be sustainable. In autumn 2021, Transport for London opened a consultation requesting opinions on if the route should be extended, or withdrawn.

In March 2022, Transport for London confirmed that the Sunday service would be withdrawn in the summer and that the route would be extended to Dagnam Park Square.

In January 2024, following a public consultation, Transport for London confirmed that the route would be withdrawn on 9 March 2024. It was replaced by an extension of route 346 that now serves all the same roads and stops formerly served by route 497.

On 9 March 2024, the route was withdrawn.

== Former route ==
Route 497 operated via these primary locations:

- Harold Hill Dagnam Park Square
- Harold Hill Hilldene Avenue
- Gallows Corner Tesco
- Harold Wood station
