= Kemnal Technology College =

Location
- Sevenoaks Way; London Borough of Bromley, Greater London, DA14 5AA; England; 51.41211°N 0.11021°E

Information
- Type: Academy
- Established: 1954; 72 years ago
- Department for Education URN: 136281 Tables
- Ofsted: Reports
- Head Teacher: Josh Denton
- Gender: Boys
- Age: 11 to 16
- Website: ktc-tkat.org

Kemnal Technology College is a boys secondary school located in St Paul's Cray Orpington, in the London Borough of Bromley, England.

== History ==
The school was first established in 1954 in the former buildings of Chislehurst and Sidcup Grammar School as Cray Valley Technical School. The name was changed to Cray Valley Technical High School for Boys in 1968. Later it became Kemnal Manor Upper School from September 1974 when Cray Valley merged with Edgebury Secondary Modern in Mottingham. Kemnal Technology College was converted to academy status in February 2012, and was previously a community school under the direct control of Bromley London Borough Council. The school continues to coordinate with Bromley London Borough Council for admissions. The school has also been designated as a Training school.

Kemnal suffered a flood in November and December 2016 which led to the school closing for four days in total: three days in November due to health and safety conditions, and one day at the end of the Christmas term. Remedial works have completed.

== Description ==
Kemnal Technology College offers GCSEs and BTECS as programmes of study for pupils, while A-Levels are not offered as the school does not have a sixth form. The school also has a specialism in technology, and has additional resources for the specialism.
