= Charles Darwin School =

Secondary school in Kent, England

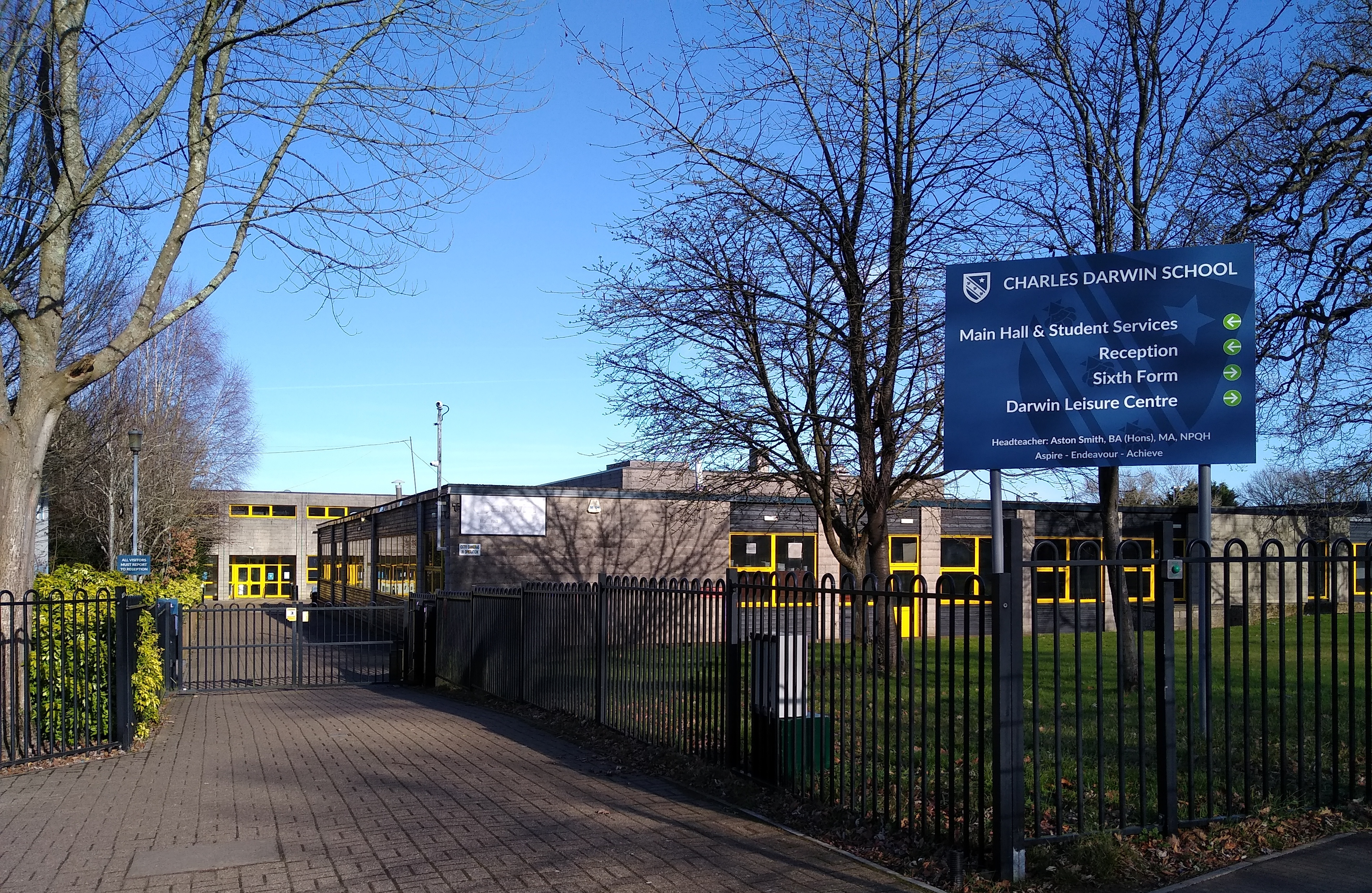

Location
- Jail Lane; Biggin Hill, Westerham, Greater London, TN16 3AU; United Kingdom; 51°18′54″N 0°02′42″E

Information
- Type: Academy
- Motto: Aspire Endeavour Achieve
- Established: 1974
- Department for Education URN: 136545 Tables
- Ofsted: Reports
- Head Teacher: Aston Smith
- Gender: Coeducational
- Age: 11 to 18
- Enrolment: Approx. 1300
- Houses: Grant; Henslow; Lyell; Wedgewood
- Publication: The Link
- Website: www.cdarwin.com

Charles Darwin School is a secondary school in the Biggin Hill area of the London Borough of Bromley, England. The school consists of 1,320 secondary and sixth form students. Currently the head teacher is Aston Smith. The school was rated 'Good' in an October 2013 Ofsted inspection. Students at GCSE achieved 69.4% A*-C grades, including English and maths, with 90% 5 GCSE good grades. At A-level 82% of sixth formers gained A-C grades.

The school is London's most southerly school. It is the only secondary school in the Biggin Hill area. It has a catchment including schools from Bromley, Croydon, Kent and Surrey. Public transport to the school is via 246, 320, 464, 664, 684, 695(Metrobus), R2 and R8 bus routes.

The school is also a creative arts college. In sports, pupils have represented and have won events at Kent County level in boys' and girls' football, rugby and cricket. The school facilities include a gym and an all-weather astro-turf football pitch.
