= St Giles School =

Location
- Pampisford Road; Croydon, Greater London, CR2 6DF; England; 51.35589°N 0.10611°W

Information
- Type: Community special school
- Established: 1925
- Local authority: Croydon
- Department for Education URN: 101852 Tables
- Ofsted: Reports
- Headteacher: Mrs. Marianne Rodger-Weetman
- Gender: Coeducational
- Age: 4 to 19
- Enrolment: 108
- Website: http://www.st-gilesschool.co.uk

St Giles School is a special school located in South Croydon in the London Borough of Croydon, England. The school is a specialist school for physical and sensory needs and is for pupils with physical disabilities and complex medical needs from 4 – 16, and pupils with profound and multiple learning difficulties (PMLD) from 11 to 19. The school admits pupils from Croydon and the surrounding boroughs.

St. Giles opened in 1925 and was originally sited in Thornton Heath. In 1933 the school moved to Featherbed Lane, Croydon, close to what is now Forestdale and in 1977 it moved to its current site in Pampisford Road.

The school has onsite medical and therapy provision with nurses and healthcare assistants on the school site at all times whilst the pupils are in school.
