= St Edward's Church of England Academy =

Location
- London Road; Romford, London, RM7 9NX
- Coordinates: 51°34′21″N 0°09′16″E

Information
- Type: Academy
- Religious affiliation: Church of England
- Established: 1710; 316 years ago
- Department for Education URN: 145944 Tables
- Ofsted: Reports
- Headteacher: J Hassan
- Staff: 100
- Gender: Coeducational
- Age: 11 to 18
- Enrolment: 1288
- Publication: Reachout
- Website: http://www.stedwardsacademy.co.uk

St Edward's Church of England Academy is a coeducational secondary school and sixth form, located in the Romford area of the London Borough of Havering, England. It specialises in languages and science, and was founded in 1710, making it the oldest school in the area.

Following recent expansion from a six form to eight form entry and a larger sixth form, there are currently 1,288 students in the school, aged between 11 and 18. The school is located in London Road, Romford. The current Headteacher is Jodie Hassan.

== History ==
The original St Edward's school was founded as a charity school in 1710. The vestry book for St Edwards Church in Romford records an entry on 5 September of that year "whereas a charity school is erecting or setting up with all possible speed to be set up and opened in this town of Romford... for the educating of poor children and teaching them to Read and Write and instructing them in the knowledge and practice of the Christian religion as professed and taught in the Church of England".

For the first eighteen years the school was accommodated in two houses, but in 1728 it moved to a new building in the Market Place in Romford, where it remained until the mid 1960s when the primary and secondary classes separated and moved to their present sites. The primary school remained on its old site until 1975 when the new premises were completed. This site is now a shopping centre but was initially a leisure complex called the Dolphin Centre.

St Edward's School and St Edward's Primary School are now run independently.

Every year there is a production put on by the school's drama and music department.

== Recent history ==
Approximately £2 million has been spent expanding the school by building a new block, which includes five science labs, a computer suite, two large drama studios and fifteen regular classrooms.

The school was previously made into a Language College. This gave it access to further funding for courses in Spanish, French and German to up to A level, as well as lessons in Mandarin up to GCSE. The school gained a second specialism in science.

The school underwent more building works in the lower block of the school. These created a new extended and modernized library, and a brand new 'Jack Petchey' suite (in honor of the grant money provided by the Jack Petchey Foundation) in the former Sixth Form library which is above the main library. The PE facilities have also been expanded giving a new PE office, store, changing rooms and fitness suite. A new sports pavilion on the edge of the 'Westlands' field was also completed.

The school converted to academy status on 1 August 2011, but continues to have languages and science as specialisms. On 1 April 2018, the school joined the Samuel Ward Academy Trust, taking a new legal entity and name.

== School newsletter ==
A monthly newsletter is published by the school. This is entitled "Reachout" and keeps students up to date on current affairs within the school and can mark out special activities or events, such as sporting events, "rag week" and the end of year prom.

== Sporting successes ==
The school competes in a number of sports, most notably in volleyball–the school's female under 17 team qualified for the World Schools Volleyball Championship in Croatia, where they represented the whole of England. The school also has teams athletics and football as well as handball.

As of February 2010, the school is also the training ground for the Chelmsford Clippers baseball club.

== School links ==
The School has links within the local area and internationally. It works alongside two local churches, St Edward's and St Andrew's, and with St Edward's Primary School. Internationally, it runs exchanges with a school in Paris in France and Zaragoza in Spain. It also has developed links with a school in Beijing to support the teaching of Mandarin as a GCSE course. They also have links with a school in Cologne trips are now held annually for year 8 students to visit. In Easter 2008 five year 10 pupils, a few sixth formers and teachers travelled to Cuba to develop further links. It also has strong links to its partnership school in the Gambia with teachers occasionally visiting.

== Notable former pupils ==
- Steve Williams, former Southampton, Arsenal and England professional footballer
- Katy Hill, former Blue Peter and children's TV presenter
- Christine Ohuruogu, Olympic 400m gold medallist
- Joe Widdowson, Footballer
- Joe Martin, Footballer
- David Martin, Footballer
- Guvna B, Christian MC
- SugarComa, former nu metal band
