= Shrublands =

Shrublands or scrublands may refer to:

- Shrubland, a habitat type called scrubland, scrub, brush, or bush
- Shrublands (house), a heritage-listed former mansion in Melbourne, Victoria, Australia
- Scrublands (novel), an Australian crime novel
  - Scrublands (TV series), an Australian television series, based on the 2018 novel
- Shrublands, a council estate in Spring Park, Croydon, in the London Borough of Bromley, England
