= Cleeve Park School =

Location
- Bexley Lane; Sidcup, Greater London, DA14 4JN; England; 51°25′43″N 0°07′11″E

Information
- Type: Academy
- Motto: Commitment, Pride, Success
- Established: 1986; 40 years ago
- Department for Education URN: 138686 Tables
- Ofsted: Reports
- Executive headteacher: Mrs Alex O'Donnell
- Gender: Coeducational
- Age: 11 to 18
- Enrolment: 990
- Website: http://www.cleevepark-tkat.org/

Cleeve Park School was formed in 1986 by the merger of Parklands School for Boys and Sidcup School for Girls. The new mixed school was formed on the site of Parklands School on its current location in Bexley Lane. Mrs Evelyne Hinde was the first head Teacher of Cleeve Park School and oversaw its formation.

The school is set in extensive grounds on the edge of the Footscray Meadows. The original Parklands school building dates back to 1950 and that building still forms part of the current school. The building has been extended and developed several times over the years most notably with a new wing added in 1990 and then a further section in 1995, both opened by the then MP for Bexley Sir Edward Heath.

Cleeve Park was a local authority community school until 31 August 2012. On 1 September 2012 the school was a converter academy and joined The Kemnal Academies Trust.

In Summer of 2015, a maths and PE teacher "Mr Thompson" received a Golden Apple award from Good Morning Britain, and a film crew came into the school to record this event.

== Development ==
Around the Summer of 2019, the School logo and uniform changed from a standard blue worn by many other schools to a distinctive burgundy with a white logo on top. This was done partially due to pupil input and most likely due to the development of Cleeve Meadow School:

A further expansion to create a new set of buildings for 100 new special educational needs students has been constructed. This officially opened as Cleeve Meadow School in September 2020. This building is also used by the main school students for Music and Drama lessons, as well as Showcases/Performances.

In August 2023, the school, as many across the country, found RAAC in some of its classrooms. This however did not greatly affect the school, only closing some classrooms and a sports hall. The school took delivery of 6 Portacabins in late October/Early November 2023 to make up for the loss of teaching space. The Main Hall was secured for use again in January 2024.

In February 2024, the school was inspected by Ofsted and received a "Good" rating across all areas, showing a significant development since the previous "Requires Improvement" grade given in 2019. This was largely due the major shift in student and staff expectations as well as an overall change in staff in the years 2021-2023.

In September 2024, The school's Leadership hierarchy changed, which kept the Executive Headteacher but also included a new Head of School - Mr Daniel Pourtsmouth.
