= Bishopsford Road Bridge =

Bridge in London

- Coordinates: 51°23′43.38″N 0°10′24.29″W
- Carries: Road
- Crosses: River Wandle
- Other name(s): Mitcham Bridge

History
- Rebuilt: 2020/2021

Bishopsford Road Bridge (also called Mitcham Bridge) is a bridge in London that carries a road over the River Wandle.

== History ==
The bridge was rebuilt around 1759 with funding from the county of Surrey, though a bridge in this location had existed for some time prior. The bridge was widened and a parallel pedestrian bridge built in the 1940s. Work on stabilising the bridge was started in April 2019.

The bridge collapsed on 14 June 2019 following flooding in the River Wandle four days earlier.

As a result of the collapse, the routes 118, 280, N44 and N133 buses had to be diverted. A temporary route, numbered 718, was introduced on 30 November 2019 with a half-hourly frequency to restore service from stops previously served by 118, N133 to Morden tube station.

In 2020, the remains of the bridge were demolished. In October 2020, designs for a new bridge were approved.

The bridge was reopened to cars in October 2021, and to buses in December 2021.
