= Scrattons Eco Park =

Nature reserve in Dagenham, London

Coordinates: 51.529°N 0.135°E

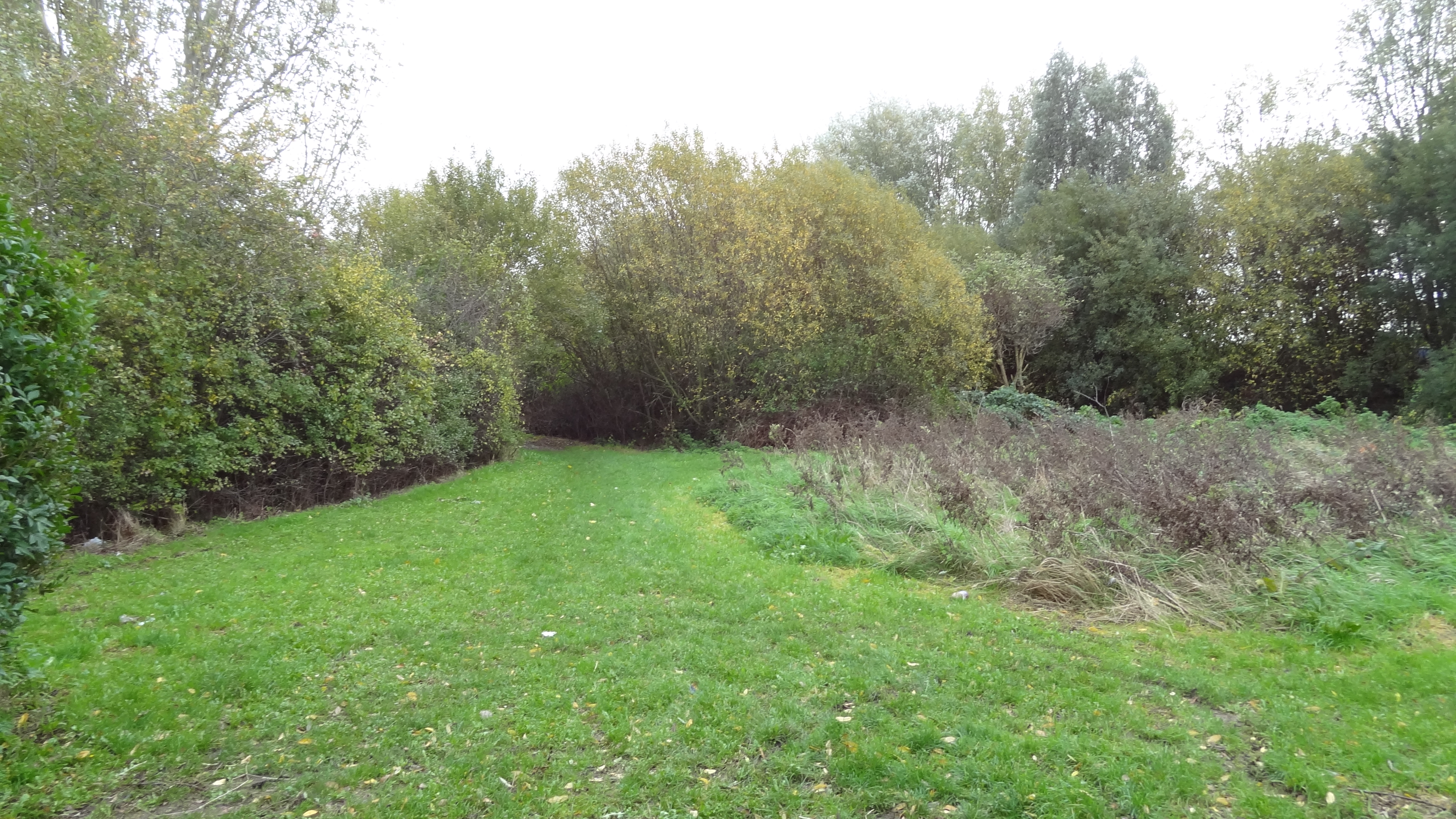

Scrattons Eco Park or Scrattons Farm Eco Park is a small nature reserve in Dagenham in the London Borough of Barking and Dagenham. It is owned and managed by the council. It was formerly marshland and allotments, but by the late 1990s the former allotments had become overgrown and inaccessible, and it was decided to convert it into an ecological park. It now has blocks of bramble with grass paths, preserving existing trees and shrubs. The aim is to create a range of habitats for plants, birds, insects and mammals.

In 2006 Scrattons Ecopark and extension was designated a local nature reserve with an area of two hectares. The entrance to the park is by a footpath at the end of Morrison Road. There is no public access to the extension off Levine Gardens.
