= Coldblow =

Coordinates: 51.436492°N 0.165305°E

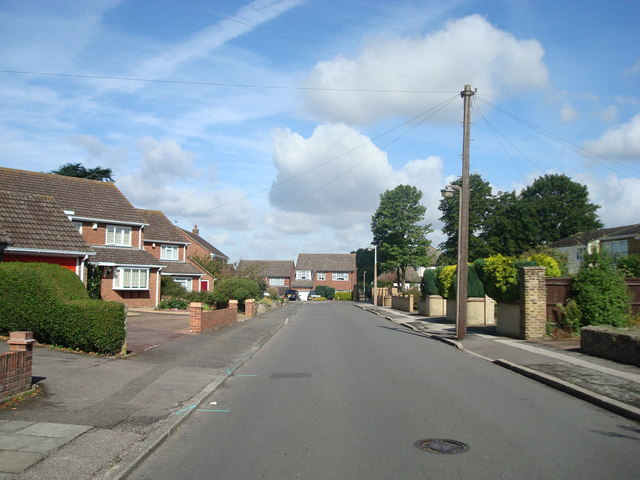

- Location within Greater London
- London borough: Bexley
- Ceremonial county: Greater London
- Region: London
- Country: England
- Sovereign state: United Kingdom
- Post town: BEXLEY
- Postcode district: DA5
- Dialling code: 020
- Police: Metropolitan
- Fire: London
- Ambulance: London
- London Assembly: Bexley and Bromley

Coldblow is a village in South East London within the London Borough of Bexley. It is located south east of Bexleyheath and south west of Dartford, adjacent to the Greater London boundary with the county of Kent.

== Transport ==
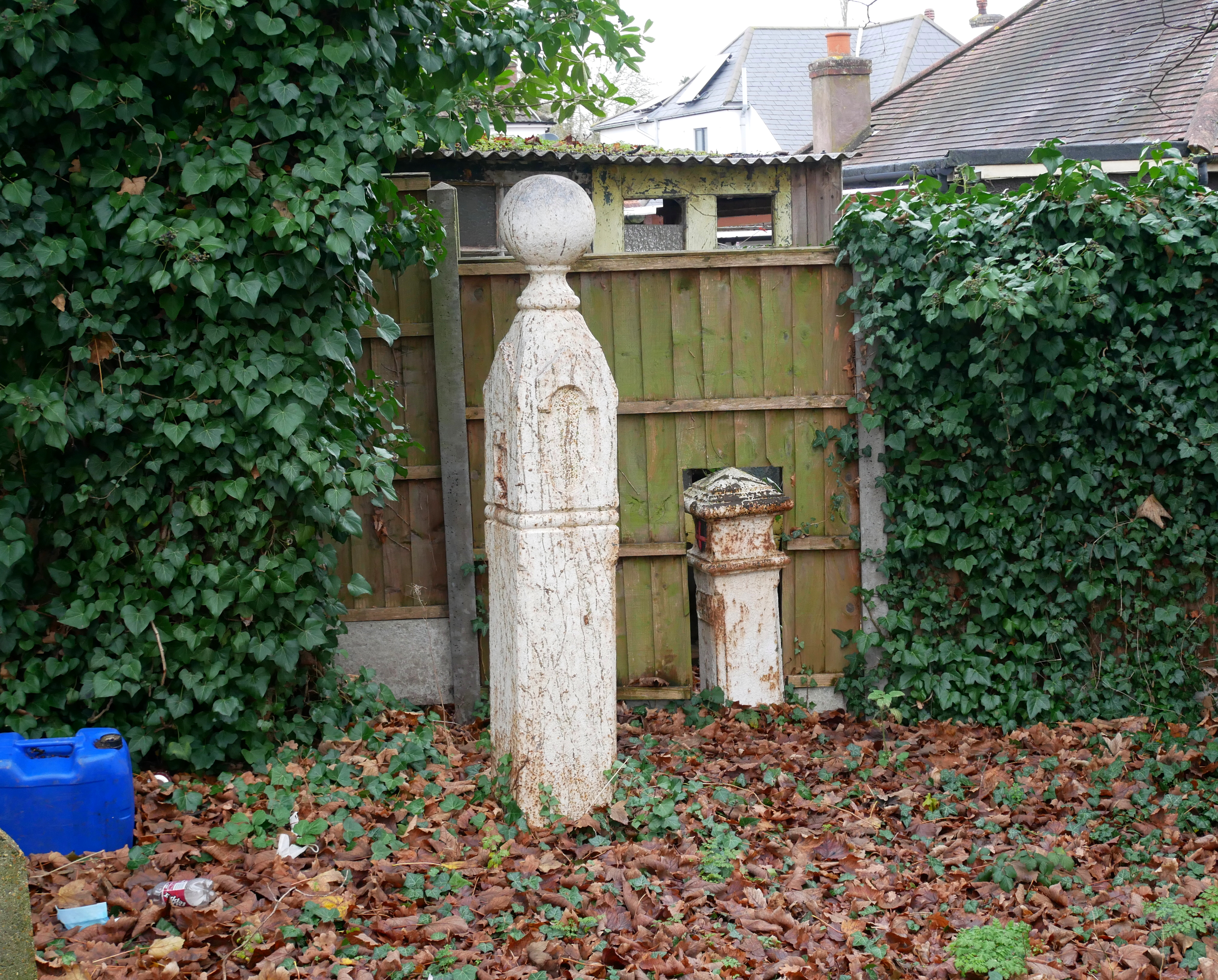
The Grade II listed, 19th-century coal tax post and iron pollard along Tile Kiln Road in Coldblow

=== Buses ===
- 429 to Dartford via Wilmington or to West Kingsdown via Joyden's Wood, Swanley & Farningham. Mondays to Saturdays only. Operated by Go-Coach.
- B12 to Erith via Bexley, Bexleyheath & Northumberland Heath or to Joyden's Wood. Operated by London Central for London Buses.

=== Rail ===
The nearest National Rail station to Coldblow is Bexley.
