= Dagenham Park Church of England School =

Location
- School Road; Dagenham, London, RM10 9QH; England; 51.53462°N 0.15578°E

Information
- Type: Voluntary controlled school
- Religious affiliation: Church of England
- Established: 1 January 2010; 16 years ago
- Local authority: Barking and Dagenham
- Department for Education URN: 136028 Tables
- Ofsted: Reports
- Head of School: Chris Ash
- Gender: Coeducational
- Age: 11 to 18
- Enrolment: 1262
- Website: https://www.dagenhampark.org.uk/

Dagenham Park Church of England School or Dagenham Park School, previously known as Dagenham Priory, is a secondary school located in the London Borough of Barking and Dagenham. The school has improving GCSE results.

Dagenham Park is an average sized comprehensive school for students between 11 and 18 years.

The school has students from a wide range of ethnic groups and a designated unit for 50 students with moderate learning difficulties.

== Local Issues ==
There have been significant issues with youth violence in the Barking and Dagenham area, including towards Dagenham Park pupils. Knife attacks on under-25s in the area rose by 178% between 2013 and 2018.

On 19 March 2017, former Dagenham Park School pupil David Adegbite, 18, was ambushed by a gang who surrounded him in a car park in Barking before shooting him in the head, killing him.

On 23 June 2017, former Dagenham Park School pupil Tyler Dawson, 18, was stabbed five times in the groin, leading to his right leg being amputated.

On 1 August 2017, former Dagenham Park School pupil Joshua Bwalya who was 16, was stabbed to death by local youths. Two friends with him were also stabbed but survived.
