= Emerson Park Academy =

Location
- Wych Elm Road; Hornchurch, Greater London, RM11 3AD; England; 51°34′10″N 0°14′35″E

Information
- Type: Academy
- Motto: Endeavour, Persevere, Achieve
- Established: 1943; 83 years ago
- Specialist: Sports
- Department for Education URN: 137414 Tables
- Ofsted: Reports
- Headteacher: Scott McGuinness
- Gender: Coeducational
- Age: 11 to 16
- Enrolment: 963
- Houses: Brunel, Cavell, Hepworth, Redgrave
- Colours: Green, Navy Blue, Yellow, Red,
- Alumni: Old Emersonians
- Former name: Hornchurch Grammar School
- Website: http://www.emersonparkacademy.org

Emerson Park Academy, formerly Hornchurch Grammar School, is an academy school located in the Hornchurch area of the London Borough of Havering, England. It is situated just east of Emerson Park, between Hornchurch and Upminster.

== History ==
=== Grammar School ===
The school was established in 1943 during World War II as Hornchurch County High School, and opened with 75 boys and girls and a staff of 4 teachers on Cedar Avenue in Upminster (now the site of Branfil Primary School). By 1952 there were 294 students and it was clear that larger premises were needed.

A new school was built after the war on farmlands extending from Wych Elm Road down to the River Ingrebourne, providing a large playing field area. The school was opened in September 1954, renamed Hornchurch Grammar School, and originally with 560 students. On 13 April 1964, the prime minister gave a talk at the school, and later in the year on 27 July the (new) prime minister also visited the school. (Note: The source for this much-repeated story is elusive, and it may be apocryphal. Also, Sir Alec Douglas-Home was prime minister in both April and July 1964; Harold Wilson became the new prime minister in October 1964.)

Mr Walter May was headmaster from 1952 to 1970. During that period, all teachers wore academic gowns in the classroom. The school motto was "A Good Name Endureth", written beneath the same emblem used by the present academy. School houses were named Harwood, Langtons, Fairkytes and Tomkyns, after historical private houses in the area. Each year a new intake of pupils joined the first form, selected by passing the 11-plus exam. Subsequently, they were streamed by academic ability into A, Alpha, B and C streams.

The school buildings were extended several times, eventually accommodating over 800 boys and girls. Additions included woodwork and metalwork shops, an annex for the sixth form including a student common room, a cricket pavilion, a language lab with reel to reel tape recorders, and a swimming pool. The last two were paid for by fundraising organised by the Parents' Association (there was no Parent–Teacher Association).

In the early 1970s, the school held several notable school dances with visiting bands who later became world-famous, including The Sweet on 31 March 1969, and Roxy Music and Supertramp on the same bill on 25 July 1972. (Note: A fuller band list is: summer 1971: Help Yourself; Christmas 1971: Supertramp; 25 July 1972: Supertramp, Roxy Music; Christmas 1972: UFO; 18 July 1973: East of Eden; 19 December 1973: Good Habit.)

=== Change to Comprehensive School ===
Mr May was succeeded by Mr John Fowler in 1970, who guided the changes to become a comprehensive school in 1973 named Emerson Park School. In 1991 the sixth form was transferred to a new, separate sixth form college.

The school was officially opened as a Specialist Sports College by Sir Trevor Brooking in 2004. The school became an academy in 2011 and renamed Emerson Park Academy, having around 1,000 students. The school continues to specialise in sports.

== Academic performance ==
The Academy was inspected by Ofsted in November 2011 and was deemed to be a "good school with outstanding features".

In 2011 over 72% of students achieved 5 or more A*- C GCSE grades, including English and Mathematics. The number of students achieving 5 A* - C GCSE grades or more across the curriculum increased to 88%. This performance placed the Academy in the top 4 schools in the Borough and performing above average.

In 2012 59% of students achieved 5 or more A*- C GCSE grades, including English and Mathematics. This performance placed the Academy in the bottom five schools in the Borough and performing below average. Havering is one of the better London LEAs, with many well-performing schools. A-level provision is available at the nearby Havering Sixth Form College.

In 2014, results dropped to the lowest level in 7 years, with only 55% of students achieved 5 or more A*- C GCSE grades, including English and Mathematics. This is 5% lower than the LEA average.

== Notable alumni ==
Hornchurch Grammar School

- Grapefruit - band
- Sir Michael Hodgkinson, business man
- Mike Oldfield - musician, left in 1968

Emerson Park Comprehensive

- Russell Gilbrook drummer since 2007 with Uriah Heep
- Andrew McDonald - civil servant and first chief executive of the Independent Parliamentary Standards Authority
- Andy C - musician
- Nathan Elder - footballer
- Alex Day - musician

Emerson Park Academy

- Michael Obafemi - footballer for Swansea City
- Kem Cetinay - Love Island star from 2017
- Aji Alese - footballer for Sunderland

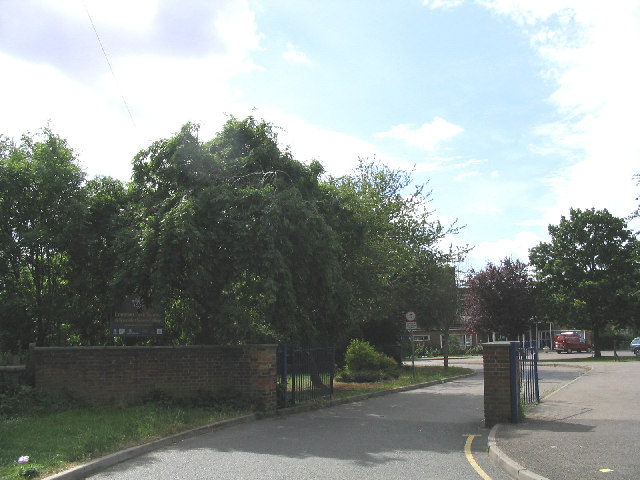
School entrance
