= Harold Wood railway station =

National Rail station in London, England

Harold Wood
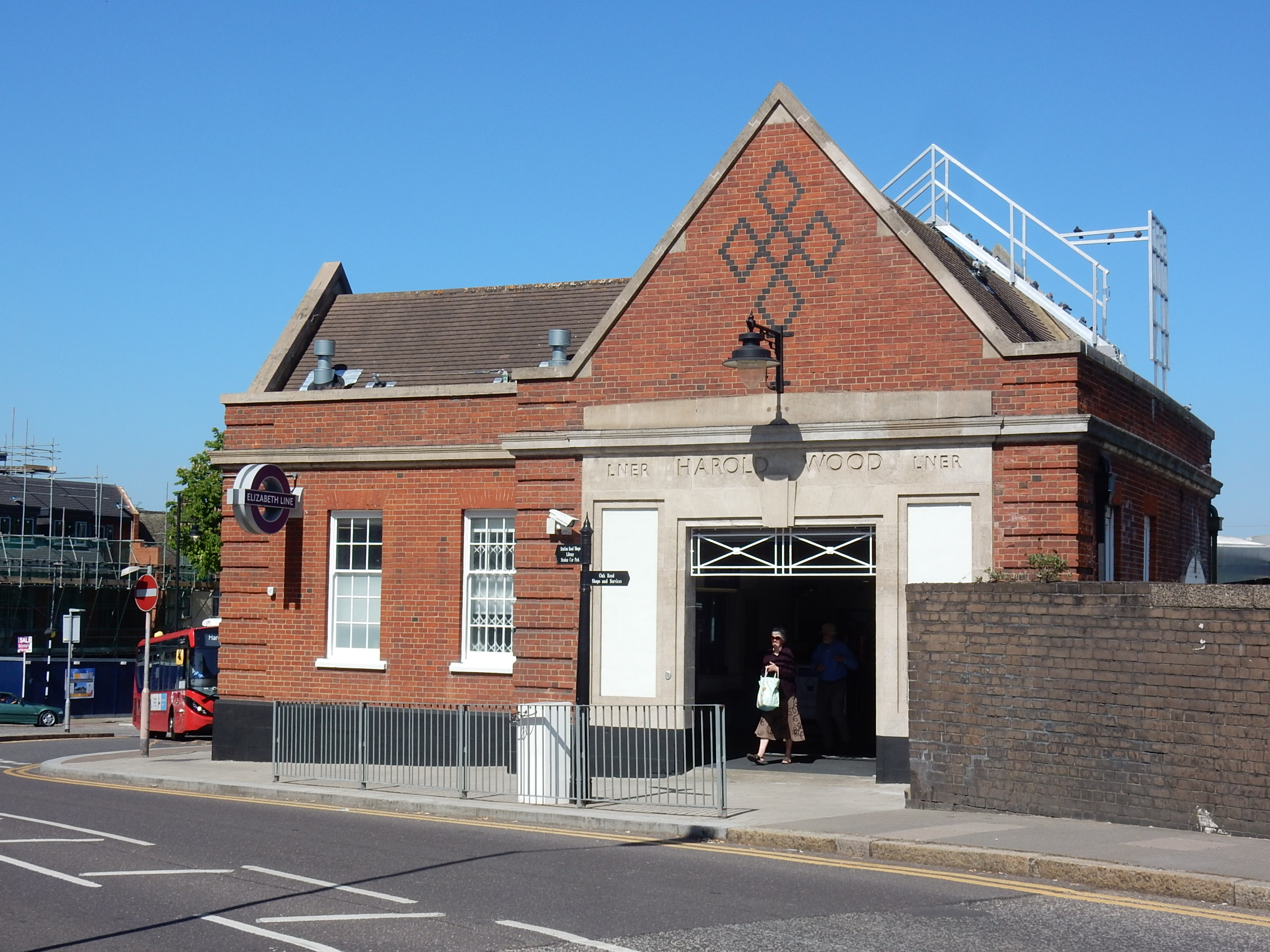
- Station entrance seen in May 2022
- Interactive map of Harold Wood

General information
- Location: Harold Wood
- Local authority: London Borough of Havering
- Managed by: Elizabeth line
- Owner: Network Rail
- Station code: HRO
- Number of platforms: 4
- Accessible: Yes
- Fare zone: 6

National Rail annual entry and exit
- 2020–21: ▼0.964 million
- 2021–22: ▲1.998 million
- 2022–23: ▲3.269 million
- 2023–24: ▲4.224 million
- 2024–25: ▼3.638 million

Key dates
- 1 December 1868: Opened

Other information
- External links: Departures; Facilities
- Coordinates: 51.5928°N 0.2343°E

Harold Wood railway station is on the Great Eastern Main Line in east London, serving Harold Wood in the London Borough of Havering. It is 14 miles 76 chains (24.1 km) down the line from London Liverpool Street and is situated between Gidea Park and Brentwood. Its three-letter station code is HRO and it is in London fare zone 6.

The station is currently managed and served by the Elizabeth line.

== History ==
Harold Wood station was opened on 1 December 1868 by the Great Eastern Railway in the north of the parish of Hornchurch. It was located on its main line from Bishopsgate in London to the east of England .The station consisted of two staggered platforms of wooden construction, the down platform accessed from Station Road and the up platform from Oak Road. Goods facilities consisted of two sidings on the north side of the line opposite the up platform, and there was also a long siding serving a brickworks. A signal box was provided at the up end of the down platform controlling the signals, access to the goods facilities, and a trailing crossover.

Two additional tracks were built to the north of the original lines in 1934 under London and North Eastern Railway ownership. The original tracks are normally used today by express services which do not call at Harold Wood. At this time the current station building was constructed on the overbridge at Gubbins Lane, and new platforms of precast concrete construction were located slightly further east nearer to the new station building. The signal box was removed as part of these works, with control of the new colour light signals shared between Gidea Park and Brentwood.

== Services ==
All services at Harold Wood are operated by the Elizabeth line using Class 345 EMUs.

The typical Monday to Friday off-peak service in trains per hour (tph) is:

- 8 tph to London Paddington of which 2 continue to Heathrow Terminal 5
- 8 tph to Shenfield

On Sundays, the service is reduced to 4 tph in each direction between Shenfield and London Paddington with 2 tph continuing to run to and from Heathrow Terminal 5.

Preceding station	Elizabeth line	Following station
Gidea Park towards Heathrow Terminal 5	Elizabeth line	Brentwood towards Shenfield

== Connections ==
London Buses routes 256, 294, 346 and 496, and First Essex route B1 serve the station.
