= Liverpool Street bus station =

Bus station in London, England

Coordinates: 51°31′6″N 0°4′57″W

Liverpool Street
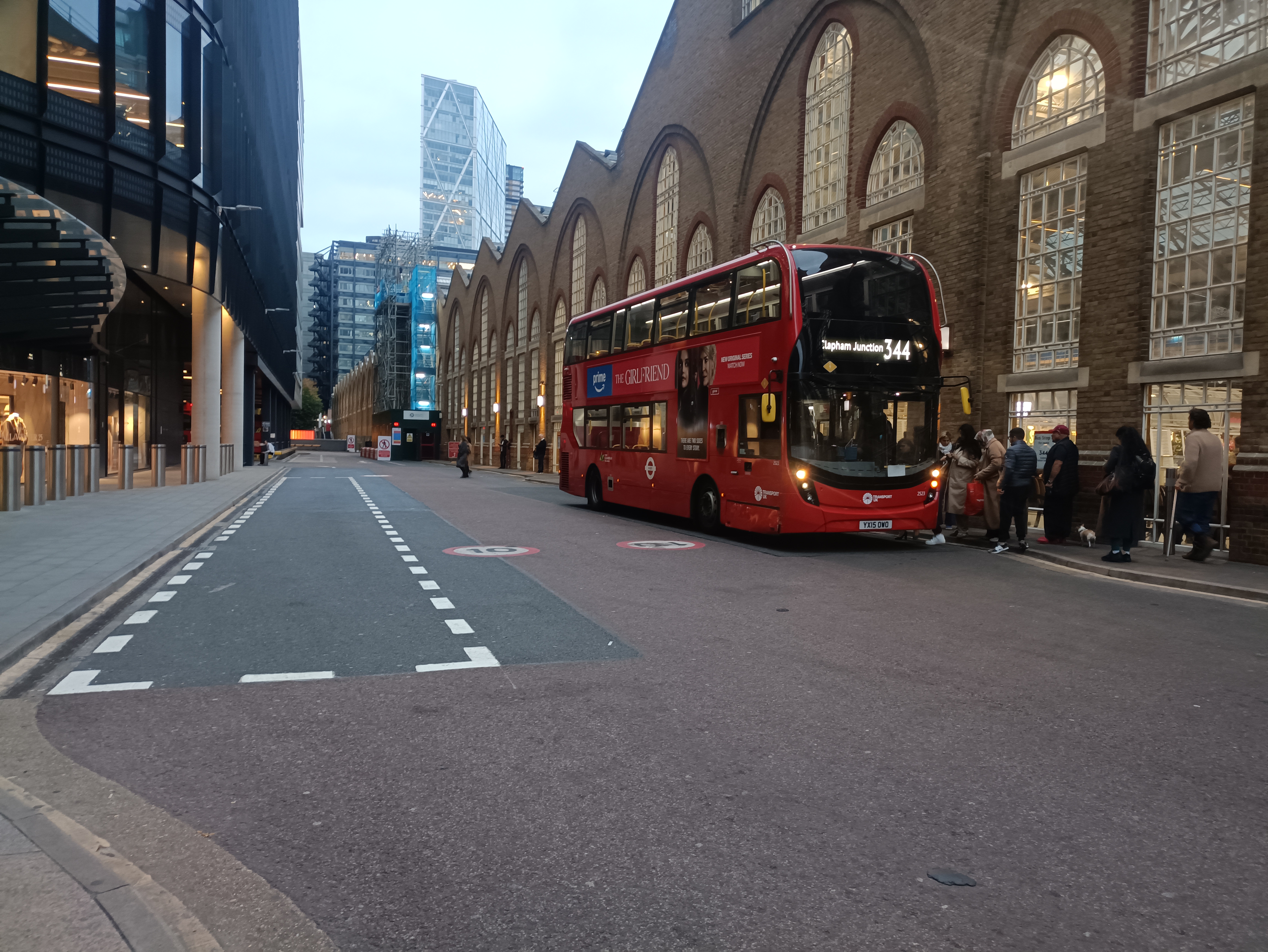
- The bus station in 2025

General information
- Location: Liverpool Street; City of London
- Operator: Transport for London
- Bus stands: 4
- Bus operators: London General; Transport UK London Bus; Stagecoach London
- Connections: Liverpool Street station
Location

Liverpool Street bus station is located within Liverpool Street station and is next to the Broadgate shopping and office complex. It has been closed since 2017 until September 2019 to allow construction work on the adjacent Broadgate site redevelopment.

== Layout ==
There are four stands at the station, named A, B, C and D. The waiting area is within the rail station on the top floor, just outside the exits to the bus stands. Buses use Sun Street to turn around and sometimes park there while not in use during off-peak hours.

== See also ==
- List of bus and coach stations in London
