= Clapton, London =

Area of Hackney, East London

Coordinates: 51.5702°N 0.0583°W

Clapton
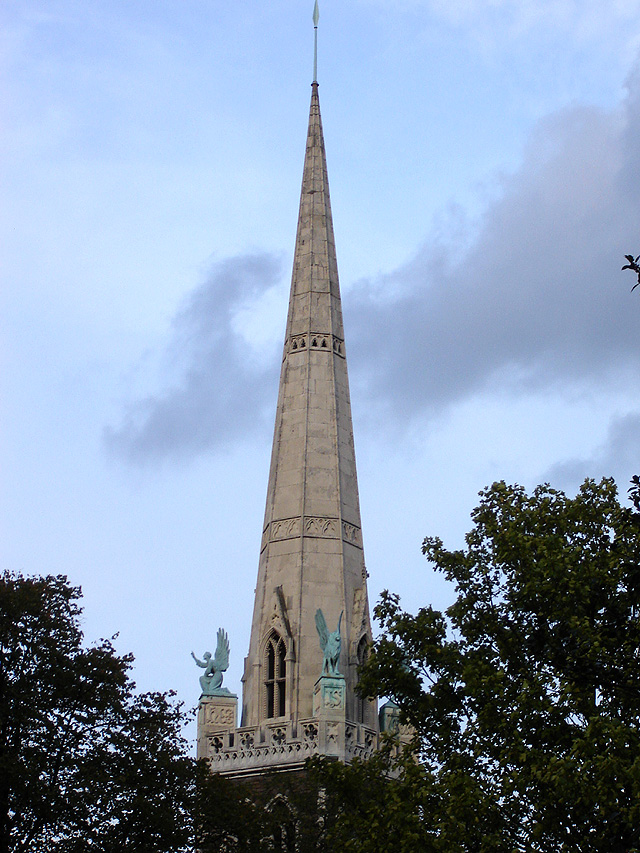
- The steeple of the Cathedral of the Nativity of Our Lord (formerly the Good Shepherd) dominates the Upper Clapton skyline.

- Location within Greater London
- OS grid reference: TQ345875
  - Charing Cross: 5.6 mi (9.0 km) SW
- London borough: Hackney
- Ceremonial county: Greater London
- Region: London
- Country: England
- Sovereign state: United Kingdom
- Post town: LONDON
- Postcode district: E5
- Dialling code: 020
- Police: Metropolitan
- Fire: London
- Ambulance: London
- UK Parliament: Hackney North and Stoke Newington; Hackney South and Shoreditch
- London Assembly: North East

Clapton is a district of Hackney, east London, England, in the London Borough of Hackney.

Clapton is divided into Upper Clapton, in the north, and Lower Clapton to the south. Clapton railway station lies 4.7 miles (7.6 km) north-east of Charing Cross.

== Geography and origins ==
The hamlet of Clapton emerged in the manor and Ancient Parish of Hackney.

=== Origins ===
The hamlet of Clapton was, from 1339 (when first recorded) until the 18th century normally rendered as Clopton, meaning the "farm on the hill". The Old English clop - "lump" or "hill" - presumably denoted the high ground which rises from the River Lea. Clapton grew up as a linear hamlet along the road subsequently known as Lower and Upper Clapton Road. As the area became urbanised, the extent of the area called Clapton eventually increased to encompass most of the north-eastern quarter of Hackney.

=== Scope ===
Because Clapton has never been an administrative unit, it has never had any defined boundaries, though the E5 postcode area (established in 1917) has been influential in shaping perceptions of the area's extent, E5 occupies most of the north-east of Hackney. The district borders the River Lea (spelled Lea or Lee) to the east.

Describing Clapton as approximating to E5 is useful, but informal and imperfect - postcode areas are not intended to define districts. An example of the imperfection of using E5 is that part of the community around Clapton Common is excluded from the postal district despite almost always being publicly viewed as being part of Upper Clapton.

=== Administrative history ===
The Ancient Parish of Hackney split from Stepney in the Middle Ages and had consistent boundaries from that time on.

The area was part of the historic (or ancient) county of Middlesex, but military and most (or all) civil county functions were managed more locally, by the Tower Division (also known as the Tower Hamlets), a historic ‘county within a county’, under the leadership of the Lord-Lieutenant of the Tower Hamlets (the post was always filled by the Constable of the Tower of London). The military loyalty to the Tower meant local men served in the Tower garrison and Tower Hamlets Militia, rather than the Middlesex Militia. This arrangement lasted until 1900.

In 1900 the Metropolitan Borough of Hackney was formed, using the boundaries of the former parish, and it became part of the County of London. In 1965 Hackney merged with the boroughs of Shoreditch and Stoke Newington to form the modern London Borough of Hackney, part of a new larger county of Greater London.

=== Upper and Lower Clapton ===
Clapton was a linear hamlet covering an extended roadside area. From the early 19th century, manorial courts distinguished the parts north and south of Lea Bridge Road as Upper and Lower Clapton, and those names soon passed into general use with Hackney Lane becoming known as Lower and Upper Clapton roads. In the late 19th century the stretch of road through the Clapton Common to Stamford Hill was named Clapton Common.

The junction with Lea Bridge Road is still used to define Upper and Lower Clapton; Kenninghall Road is an extension of Lea Bridge Road and as such also provides a convenient point of reference between the two parts of Clapton.

Clapton Cinematograph Theatre at 229 Lower Clapton Road was opened in 1910, one of the earliest purpose-built cinemas in London, established in response to the Cinematograph Act 1909.

Clapton Park, on the eastern side of Lower Clapton, combines Victorian terraces around Chatsworth Road and the post-war Clapton Park Estate. In the east of this neighbourhood, terraced housing was demolished by Hackney Council and rebuilt in the 1970s, with a small shopping precinct around Gilpin Square, and is today mostly a low-rise estate. Chatsworth Road's market, which historically ran 4–5 days a week, was revived as a Sunday market in 2010, having closed in 1990.

== Latter history ==
=== Brooke House ===
A large house known as the King's House stood on the site now occupied by BSix Sixth Form College, as early 1476. The house was within a 200-acre (0.81 km^{2}) estate, which was described as the Manor of Hackney from about 1532 to the early 17th century — although there were two other manors in the south of the Parish.

In 1532, Henry Algernon Percy, Earl of Northumberland, acquired the estate from Sir Richard Neville. However, in January 1535 the land was taken by Henry VIII; in settlement of a debt. The King visited the house in April 1535 and on 24 September 1535 he granted his "manor or principal messuage of Hackney" to Thomas Cromwell, his chief minister. Cromwell refurbished the house, and on 1 May 1536, returned the house to the King. In July 1536, Ralph Sadleir brought Mary I of England to the house to swear the Oath of Supremacy before her father, and Jane Seymour, the Queen. Henry continued to own the house until his death in January 1547. Edward de Vere, 17th Earl of Oxford, died in the house in Hackney known as the "King's House" on 24 June 1604.

The name of the house derives from its purchase by Fulke Greville, 1st Baron Brooke, in 1621 — which led to ownership by the family for over 200 years. The house became tenanted after 1724, but in 1758–9 the house was modified by a lessee, William Clarke who converted it to a lunatic asylum. The site remained in this use until 1940. It was notably managed by the Monro dynasty of doctors from 1762 to 1891, several of whom simultaneously occupied the position of Bethlem Physician; the third of these, Thomas Monro, was a prominent art collector and early patron of J. M. W. Turner, who painted the asylum circa 1794.

The remains of the house were destroyed by enemy action in October 1940. 5.5 acres (0.02 km^{2}) of Brooke House were purchased by the London County Council in 1944, and further bomb damage occurred that year. The house was finally demolished in 1954, and archaeological investigations of the Tudor palace took place in 1955–6. New school buildings were erected in 1960, designed by Armstrong and MacManus.

=== 21st century ===
The 2011 England riots affected Clapton, with Clarence Road being the epicentre of the rioting in the district, and was the site of Pauline Pearce's viral "Heroine of Hackney" speech, where she chastised rioters for their behaviour.

In 2018, parts of Clapton were flooded due to a burst water main on Waterworks Lane off the Lea Bridge Road, with flood water pouring into the River Lea.

== Local features ==
=== The Abode of Love ===
Upper Clapton is home to one of London's more unusual churches, the Church of the Good Shepherd, which was used as a place of worship by a splinter group of the Catholic Apostolic Church and now is used by the Georgian Orthodox Church. However, the church was originally built by the Agapemonite cult in 1892 as the Church of the Ark of the Covenant.

The Agapemonites, who held unconventional views on marriage and the role of women, relocated to Upper Clapton from their spiritual community in Spaxton, Somerset, and had prospered by this time. Although it is fairly conventional in floor plan, the outside of the church features extensive statuary and symbolism. The main doorways have large carvings of angels and the four evangelists symbolised by a man, an eagle, a bull and a lion. The same four figures, cast in bronze, look out over the four quarters of the Earth from the base of the steeple. The two flanking weather vanes are inspired by William Blake's Jerusalem and depict a fiery chariot and a sheaf of arrows (presumably of desire), while the main steeple is clearly surmounted by a spear. The stained glass windows, designed by noted children's book illustrator Walter Crane, and made by J S Sparrow, illustrate the 'true station of womankind'.

The church, which was completed in 1895, was designed by Joseph Morris and his family, some of whom were members of the sect. The style is Gothic Revival; for its "curiosity value" it was designated a Grade II-listed building on 12 September 1969.

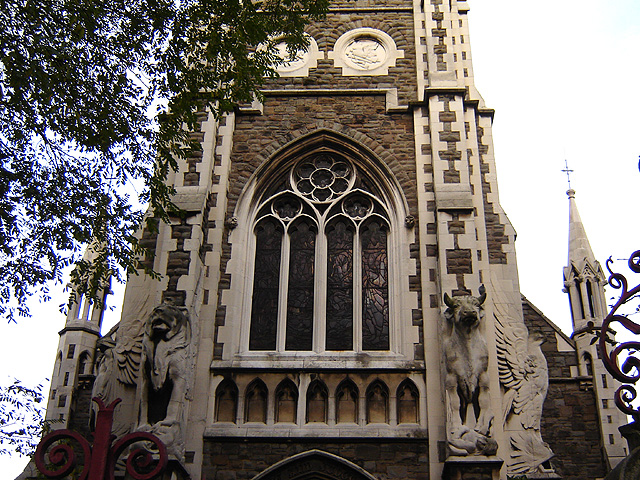
The Good Shepherd's main entrance. (October 2005)

The cult had always been surrounded by scandal during its sojourn in Somerset and, after the move to Clapton, this degenerated into sheer farce. The original leader, Henry James Prince, who claimed to be immortal, died in 1899 and was succeeded by the charming but philandering John Hugh Smyth-Pigott, who wasted no time before declaring himself as the Messiah. Challenged by a jeering mob to prove his godhood by walking across Clapton Pond, Smyth-Pigott declined and retired to Somerset, where he was said to enjoy the favours of as many as seven "spiritual brides" a week. Smyth-Pigott, who also claimed immortality, died in 1927, after which the cult went into decline. The Clapton church had already been abandoned by the cult and was acquired first by the Ancient Catholic Church in 1956, and then by the Georgian Orthodox Church in 2005.

=== The New Synagogue ===
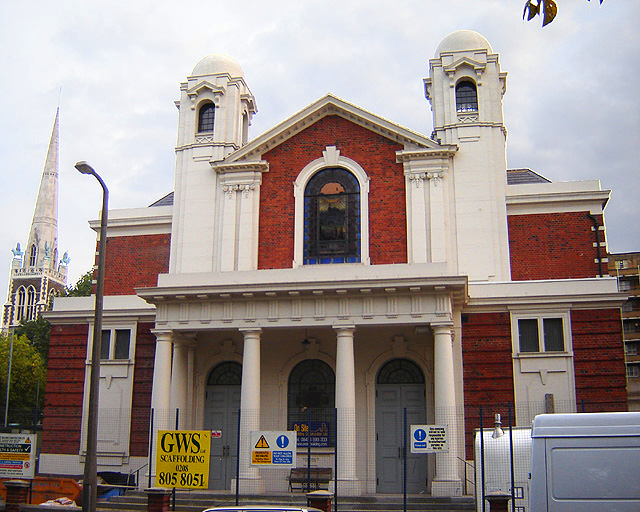
The New Synagogue. Spire of the Good Shepherd in the background. (October 2005)

Close by the Good Shepherd is the stately New Synagogue, on the eastern side of Clapton Common. This Grade II listed building is a little deceptive, appearing much older than it actually is. In spite of its handsome Georgian-style exterior, this is actually post-Edwardian, built in 1915. It is, however, a faithful replica of an earlier building, the Great St Helen's Synagogue in the City of London, which was designed by John Davies in 1838. The current building contains a number of original fixtures from its predecessor. Endangered for a while, the synagogue was restored in 2005.

=== Anchor and Hope pub ===
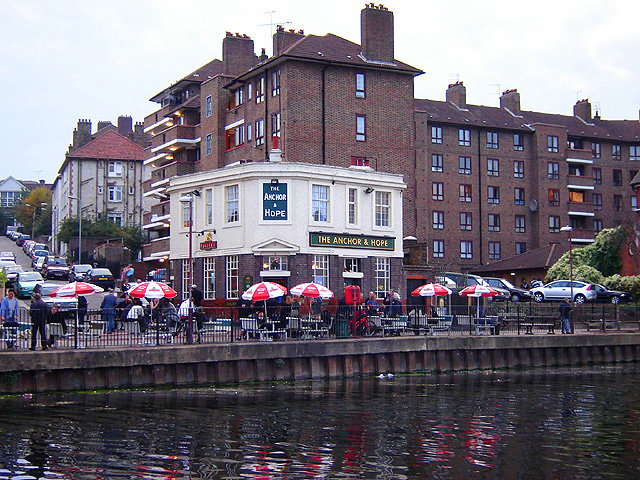
The Anchor and Hope, a war survivor overshadowed by postwar High Hill Estate. (October 2005)

The Anchor and Hope pub, which is not far from the south-east corner of Springfield Park, is a survivor of the heavy bombing along the Lea during the Second World War, and is one of the few survivors of the terraced housing that once dominated the area. It is now quite overshadowed by pre- and post-war blocks of flats.

=== Urban fabric ===
Large parts of Lower Clapton look much as they did when the area was first developed in the second half of the 19th century. Most of the housing stock consists of Victorian terraces of various sizes. Several highrise LPS constructions erected by the Council in the late 1960s and early 1970s were demolished in the 1990s to make way for lowrise Local Authority housing, e.g. the Clapton Park Estate.

== Open spaces ==
- Clapton Pond has existed since the 1600s and was re-landscaped for public use in the late 1800s, which largely survives today. In 2004 funds were raised by a neighbourhood action group to install modern improvements to this historic green. As a result of the restoration project, Clapton Pond has become a vibrant and well used community park. In February 2022, Hackney Council concluded a £60,000 landscaping and upgrading of the play area to cater to the many young families living in the area.
- The Springfield Park was formed in 1905 from the grounds of three private houses, one of which still survives as a cafe, and is today a local nature reserve.
- Clapton Square is a public garden square that is close to Hackney Central. It was laid out in 1816 in the fields of the-then manor of Hackney owned by the Tyssen family. It would be homes for senior merchants, officers and financial brokers as an upmarket residential square. It is a Conservation Area which was designated in 1969 – extended in 1991 and again in 2000.
- Hackney Downs is a 16 hectare (40 acre) park and area of former common land in Lower Clapton.
- Clapton Common, originally Broad Common (and not to be confused with Clapham Common), is a small area of former common land in Upper Clapton. A disused 1931 toilet block on the common was transformed into Liberty Hall, a community space, in 2020, following a grassroots campaign.
- Parts of Hackney Marshes might also be described as being in Clapton.
- Millfields Park, created by London County Council in 1884 incorporating former Lammas land. The eastern side of the park borders on the Lea river and its towpaths, the southern part goes along Chatsworth Road, and to the North it stretches almost to 200 meters from Clapton Station. The park is lined by mature plane and elm trees, includes tennis court, basketball courts, a cricket pitch several modern children play areas. An active group of local park users aim to improve its use for residents and biodiversity. Work underway in 2022 includes the creation of a treelined cycle and pedestrian route going east–west. The park has Green Flag Award status.
- Daubeney Fields, an 11-acre park formed of a remnant of Hackney Marsh, which includes the Hackney Bumps skatepark created in 1986 and renovated in 2019.

== Sport ==
Two of East London’s oldest sports clubs were founded in Clapton before moving a short distance across the Lower Lea where they continue to compete. Clapton Orient were founded in 1881 before moving to Leyton in 1937 and becoming known as Leyton Orient. Clapton F.C., formed in 1878 and moved to the Old Spotted Dog Ground, in Forest Gate, West Ham in 1887. Clapton Community FC split from Clapton F.C. in 2018 but continue to play at the Old Spotted Dog Ground.

== Education ==
Secondary schools in the area include Clapton Girls' Academy and Mossbourne Community Academy. Mossbourne is located on the site of the former Hackney Downs School. 'BSix Sixth Form College is a sixth form college on a site near the Lea Bridge Roundabout.

Primary schools include Millfields Community School, visited by Tony Blair in 2005, and Mandeville Primary School—alma mater of pop star and actor Anthony Newley and 2021 recipient of a Civic Trust Award for the transformation of its former caretakers' house into the Hackney School of Food— this professional teaching kitchen and community garden is decorated with a large mural by French artist and illustrator Jean Jullien

== Cultural references ==
The area and the effects of gentrification upon it, is the subject of the satirical Instagram account, The Real Housewives of Clapton.

== Notable people ==
- Eileen Atkins (born 1934), actor
- DJ Hype (born 1968), musician
- Stefflon Don (born 1991), rapper
- Fenella Fielding (1927–2018), actor
- Stanley Gelbier (born 1935), dentist
- Maria Giberne (1802–1885), artist
- Eleanor Goodrich (1888–1988), politician and activist
- Orla Hill (born 2002), actress
- Jamie Mankelow (born 1964), former professional footballer
- Martin Polden (1928–2023), solicitor
- Alan Sugar (born 1947), businessman
- George Buchanan Wollaston (1814–1899), architect, watercolourist and botanist
- Rina Yang (born 1986), cinematographer
