= George Buchanan Wollaston =

British architect and plant collector

George Buchanan Wollaston (26 April 1814, Clapton, Middlesex – 26 March 1899, Chislehurst, London Borough of Bromley) was an English architect, watercolourist, and amateur botanist. He is famous for his collection and cultivation of British ferns.

== Biography ==
Much of his family had lived in Chislehurst and his paternal grandfather Francis Wollaston was Anglican rector there from 1769 to 1815. George Buchanan Wollaston attended grammar school at The King's School, Ottery St Mary. He was apprenticed to the architect Augustus Pugin and worked as an architect for a number of years. During his apprenticeship, Wollaston became an accomplished watercolourist. He inherited the property Conduit Lodge in Eltham, London Borough of Greenwich. After this inheritance he worked very little as an architect and devoted himself to botanical study involving collecting and growing plants, especially ferns (and some orchids). Using the money gained by selling the Conduit Lodge property, he bought in Chislehurst the small property called Bishop's Well, where he lived from about 1853 until his death in 1899.

In the late 1850s, Wollaston supervised renovations and repairs of the Anglican church of St. Nicholas in Chislehurst.

He contributed articles to The Phytologist. Frederick Janson Hanbury and Edward Shearburn Marshall mention Wollaston's name 33 times in their 1899 book Flora of Kent.

In August 1843 he married his cousin Julia Adye Catharine Buchanan (1816–1910). Three of their children died in infancy. Their son Stanley George Buchanan-Wollaston (1848–1923) was the father of Herbert Arthur Buchanan-Wollaston.

In May 1981 the Covent Garden Gallery at 20 Great Russell Street exhibited some of Wollaston's watercolour drawings of rural England in the 1880s.
