= Four Forks, Spaxton =

Coordinates: 51°07′39″N 3°05′53″W

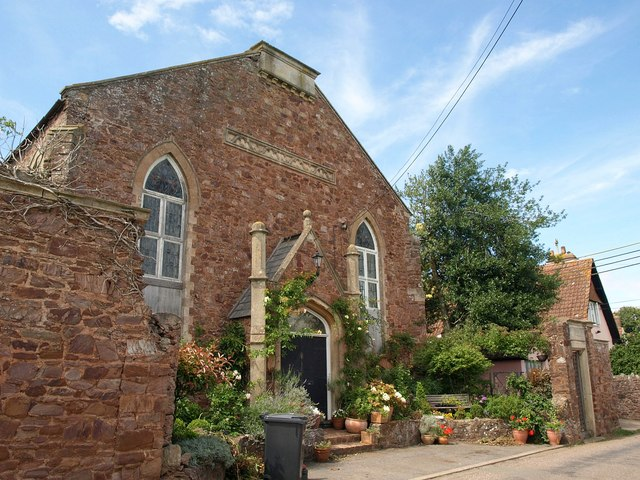
The Agapemone Chapel (2010)

Four Forks in Spaxton is a settlement in the Quantocks, west of Bridgwater, Somerset. In the nineteenth century the Agapemone or "Abode of Love" was founded by Reverend Henry Prince, former curate of Charlynch, at Four Forks.

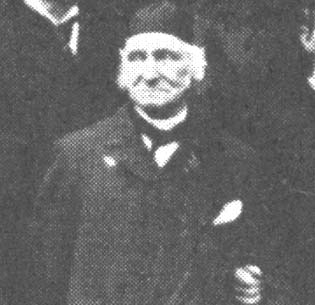
Henry James Prince (1811–1899)

In the early 20th century, a number of houses (some in the Arts and Crafts style) were built there by members of this religious cult, including Joseph Morris and his daughter Violet.

== See also ==
- Lampeter Brethren

== Bibliography ==
- Dixon, William Hepworth (1868). Spiritual Wives. Hurst & Blackett. "Prince."
- Dunning, R W; Elrington, C R; Baggs, A P; Siraut, M C (1992). "Spaxton". A History of the County of Somerset: Volume 6: Andersfield, Cannington, and North Petherton Hundreds (Bridgwater and neighbouring parishes). Institute of Historical Research.
