= Maria Adebowale-Schwarte =

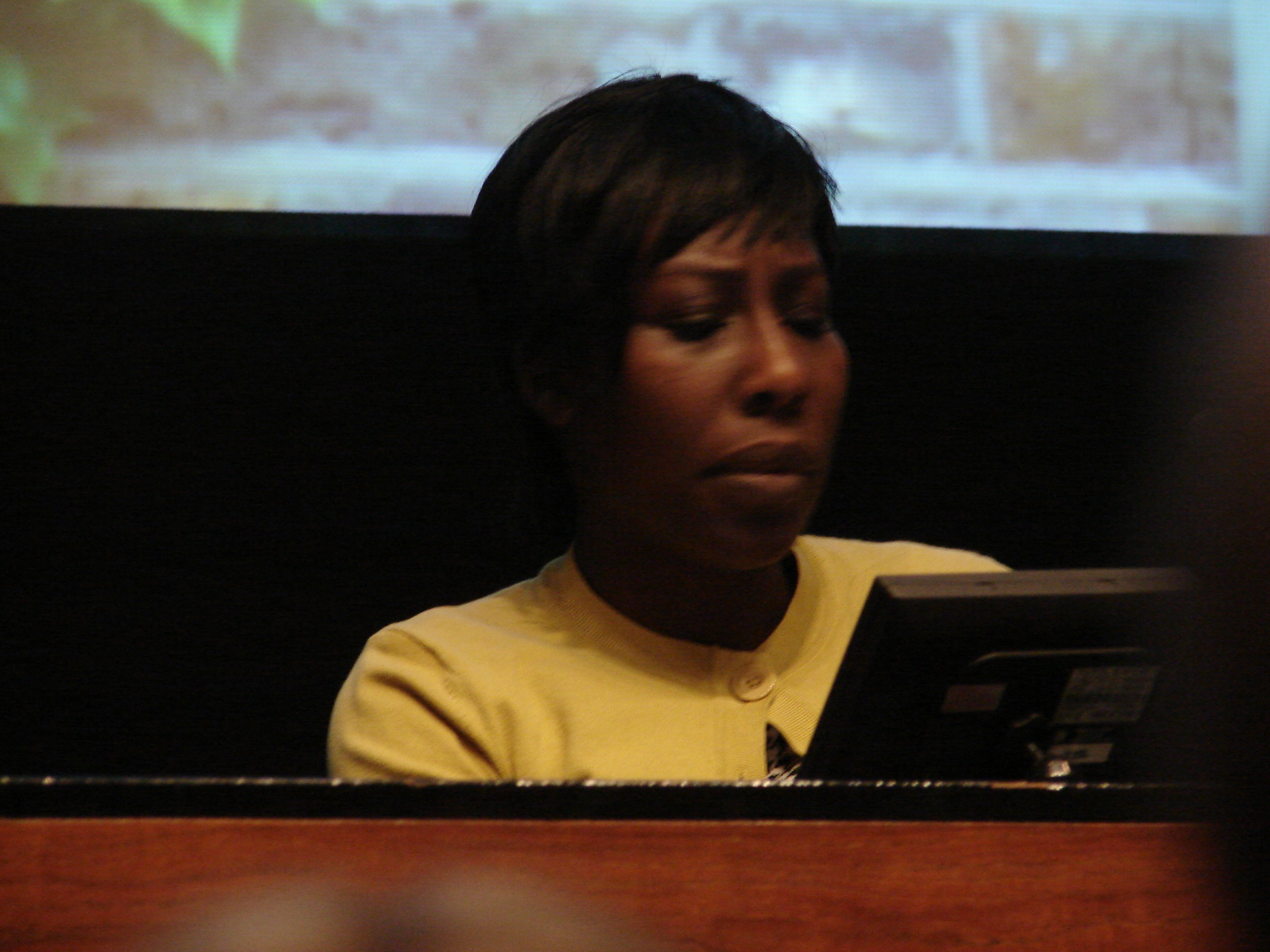
- Education: Lancaster University; De Montfort University; University of East London; SOAS
- Employer: Living Space Project
- Website: https://livingspaceproject.com/

Maria Adebowale-Schwarte (/ˈædɛˌbwɑːlɛˈʃfɑːtə/ AD-eb-WAH-lesh-FAH-tə) is the founding director of Living Space Project. She is a commissioner for the London Sustainable Development Commission and for the English Heritage.

== Early life and education ==
Adebowale-Schwarte studied Organisational Studies at Lancaster University, graduating in 1991. She joined De Montfort University in 1992. She earned a Master's degree in Public International Law from SOAS, University of London in 1996. She holds a postgraduate certificate in architecture and sustainability from the University of East London.

== Career ==
Adebowale-Schwarte served as Commissioner for the UK Sustainable Development Commission. She is concerned about inequality and the environment. She wrote a series of essays for the Joseph Rowntree Foundation about poverty in the UK. She was awarded a London Leader award from then Mayor of London, Boris Johnson, in 2011. She was the Director of the UK Environmental Law Association and remains as a patron.

In 2013 Adebowale-Schwarte founded the think tank Living Space Project. which specialises in projects that focus on urban green spaces. She was inspired by the Calouste Gulbenkian Foundation to develop a Living Space Project academy that supports all industries to make green jobs across London. In 2014 she was awarded a Clore Social Leadership Environment Fellowship. In July 2016 she was appointed by the Secretary of State for Environment, Food and Rural Affairs as the natural environment lead for the Board of the Environment Agency. In 2017 Adebowale-Schwarte was appointed by Sadiq Khan to be a commissioner on the London Sustainable Development Commission, working to identify ways to improve and protect Londoner's quality of life. She published The Placemaking Factor in 2017. The book examines how we define placemaking and the environment.

She has been an advisor for the Big Lottery Fund, Nesta, National Heritage Memorial Fund and Artists' Project Earth. She is a member of the Women's Environmental Network. She is an affiliate member of the Royal Institute of British Architects and a Fellow of the Royal Society of Arts. She is a senior fellow for the Project for Public Spaces and coordinates their philanthropy, grants and funding program. She took part in the Amsterdam Placemaking Week in 2017. In 2018 she was appointed as a trustee of the board of the National Heritage Memorial Fund. She spoke at the 2017 Women of the World Festival and the 2018 TEDxLondon. She is included in the UK Who's Who.
