= Jamie Mankelow =

English footballer

Personal information
- Date of birth: 4 September 1964 (age 62)
- Place of birth: Upper Clapton, England
- Position: Forward

Youth career
- Orient

Senior career*
Years	Team	Apps	(Gls)
1982–1983	Orient	2	(0)
1983–1984	Walthamstow Avenue		
1984	Epping Town		
- * Club domestic league appearances and goals

Jamie Mankelow (born 4 September 1964) is an English former professional footballer who played in the Football League as a forward.
