= Highmoor, Oxfordshire =

Village in Oxfordshire, England

Coordinates: 51.556°N 0.998°W

Highmoor
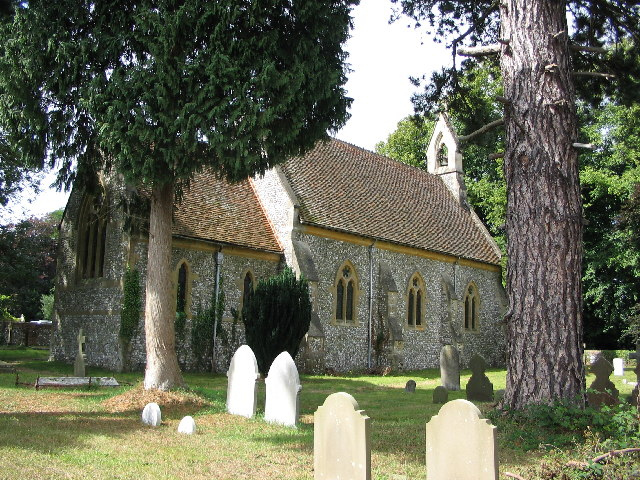
- St Pauls Church

- Location within Oxfordshire
- Area: 5.20 km^{2} (2.01 sq mi)
- Population: 278 (parish, including Satwell) (2011 census)
  - Density: 53/km^{2} (140/sq mi)
- OS grid reference: SU7084
- Civil parish: Highmoor
- District: South Oxfordshire
- Shire county: Oxfordshire
- Region: South East
- Country: England
- Sovereign state: United Kingdom
- Post town: Henley-on-Thames
- Postcode district: RG9
- Dialling code: 01491
- Police: Thames Valley
- Fire: Oxfordshire
- Ambulance: South Central
- UK Parliament: Henley and Thame

Highmoor is a village and civil parish in the Chiltern Hills, in the South Oxfordshire district, in Oxfordshire, England, about 4 miles (6.4 km) west of Henley-on-Thames. The parish includes the hamlet of Satwell. The Grade II Listed Church of England parish church of Saint Paul at Highmoor Cross was designed by the architect Joseph Morris of Reading and built by Robert Owthwaite of Henley-on-Thames in 1859 as a chapel of ease by the vicar of Rotherfield Peppard to cater for the wider rural population of the parish. Highmoor later became a separate parish but the church was closed by a pastoral order in June 2012 as a result of a dwindling congregation. The church was then put up for sale by the Diocese of Oxford. In 2011 the parish had a population of 278.

Highmoor has two public houses: the Dog and Duck near Highmoor Cross and the Rising Sun at Witheridge Hill. Both are owned by the local Brakspear Brewery. The Dog and Duck closed in December 2011 and the freehold was subsequently put on the market in March 2012 when the brewery was unable to find a new tenant. The pub remains closed as of April 2015. Chris Hollins, an English journalist, presenter and sportsman, lives in Highmoor.
