= Martin Polden =

English solicitor (1928–2023)

Martin Polden OBE (23 June 1928 – 5 April 2023) was an English solicitor noted for his contributions to environmental law.

== Biography ==
Born as Martin Alan Podeshva in Clapton, London, he attended the Royal Grammar School, High Wycombe. At the school, he demonstrated political acumen and a flair for writing, contributing to his school magazine on topics like the Hyde Park Orators.

After studying law at London School of Economics, Polden trained with WP Davies & Son before founding Polden & Co. in 1958. The firm underwent several name changes, eventually becoming Rubinstein Callingham Polden & Gale.

Polden played a pivotal role in establishing the Environmental Law Foundation (ELF) in 1992 and co-authored The Environment and the Law: A Practical Guide in 1994. His services to environmental law were recognized in 2006 when he was awarded the OBE.
