= Environmental Law Foundation =

The Environmental Law Foundation (ELF) is a UK registered charity, dedicated to environmental law and disseminating information on the subject.

== Mission ==
One of the main purposes of the organisation is to bring individuals and community groups who are trying to prevent environmental damage in touch with ELF's membership of environmental lawyers and other technical environmental specialists, who can provide information and pro bono advice on potential legal or planning cases.

ELF also organises local questions-and-answers sessions with experts for members of the public; provides training and education in the subject, and produces various publications, including the periodical, ELFline, containing among other things, case studies.

== See also ==
- UK Environmental Law Association
- Martin Polden
