= Louisa Nottidge =

British lunatic asylum detainee (1802–1858)

Louisa Nottidge (1802–1858) was a British woman whose unjust detention in a lunatic asylum attracted widespread public attention in mid-19th century England. In that period, several similar cases emerged in the newspapers of sane persons being incarcerated in lunatic asylums for the convenience or financial gain of their immediate families. The most prominent, other than Louisa Nottidge, was the case of Rosina Bulwer Lytton. This public fascination and anger was exploited by the writer Wilkie Collins, who published the best-selling novel The Woman in White in 1860. The case of Louisa Nottidge has remained of interest with respect to the rights of psychiatric patients, women's rights, and the conflict between freedom of religion and the legal process.

== Childhood ==
Louisa Jane Nottidge was born at her grandmother's house, Fulling Mill House, Bocking, Essex in 1802. Her parents, Josias Nottidge (1762–1844) and Emily Pepys (1775–1863), were wealthy wool clothiers who worked fulling mills in Bradford Street, Bocking and in Wixoe, Suffolk. From 1794, her parents lived at a large house with an eight-acre estate called Rose Hill (Floriston Hall) in Wixoe. Louisa reported that from her early youth her reading had been directed mainly towards religious texts. She attended church regularly with her six sisters and four brothers.

== The Agapemone ==
In 1843, a revivalist clergyman, Rev. Henry James Prince, preached at the church of Stoke near Wixoe. On the death of Josias Nottidge in 1844, the five unmarried sisters each inherited the sum of £6,000. Prince persuaded them to contribute to the founding of a religious community in Somerset, to be called the Agapemone, or Abode of Love. In 1845, the sisters travelled to Somerset with a view to residing at the new community; en route Prince persuaded three of the sisters—Harriet, Agnes and Clara—to marry three clergymen from the Agapemone. They were married in Swansea on the same day in 1845. Before the passage of the Married Women's Property Act 1882, all of a wife's assets passed automatically to her husband.

== Abduction ==
Prince then encouraged Louisa to join her sisters at the Agapemone. After she had travelled to Somerset, her mother Emily feared the spiritual and financial influence that Prince had established over her daughters. Emily instructed her son Edmund, her nephew Edward Nottidge, and her son-in-law, Frederick Ripley, to travel down to Somerset and to rescue her unmarried daughter Louisa. The three men succeeded in removing Louisa against her will in November 1846, and imprisoned her in Ripley's villa by Regent's Park (12 Woburn Place). Following her persistent claims regarding the divinity of Prince, her mother enlisted medical aid and had her certified insane, and then placed her in Moorcroft House Asylum, Hillingdon. Dr. Stilwell, the presiding physician, made notes on her condition and treatment, recorded in The Lancet.

== Escape ==
Louisa escaped from the asylum in January 1848, travelling across London to meet Reverend William Cobbe from the Agapemone at a hotel in Cavendish Square. Cobbe was the brother of the campaigner Frances Power Cobbe. However, Louisa was recaptured two days later at Paddington Station. Cobbe alerted the Commissioners in Lunacy, whose report by Bryan Procter led to her release in May 1848.

== Nottidge v Ripley and Another (1849) ==
Louisa then sued her brother, cousin, and brother-in-law Ripley for abduction and false imprisonment in Nottidge v. Ripley and Another (1849); the trial was reported daily in The Times newspaper. Bryan Procter was called as a professional medical witness. The Lord Chief Baron pronounced a famous dictum that: "You ought to liberate every person who is not dangerous to himself or to others." Louisa won the case with damages, proving that she had been illegally detained. Louisa then returned to the Agapemone, transferring her wealth to Prince, and remained there until her death in 1858.

In 1850, Charles Dickens reported on the case of Louisa Nottidge and the Agapemone.

== Nottidge v Prince (1860) ==
In 1860, Louisa's brother and executor, Ralph Nottidge, sued Prince to recoup the money that she had given him as a result of his undue influence over her in the case of Nottidge v. Prince (1860), reported daily in The Times newspaper. The Nottidges won the case with costs. Punch magazine then launched a campaign to encourage Prince to emigrate to America to join Brigham Young and his Mormons in the Utah desert.

== Legacy ==
Harriet Martineau wrote, in her biography of Bryan Procter, the following:

"For many years Mr Procter held the lucrative but not very congenial appointment of Commissioner of Lunacy; the responsibility of which was irksome, and occasionally (as in the case of Miss Nottidge, who was carried off from The Agapemone) alarming to a man of sensitive nature, and a hater of conflict."

Wilkie Collins dedicated his novel The Woman in White to Bryan Procter, poet and Commissioner for Lunacy.

Nottidge's case meant that the situation of women imprisoned in "lunatic asylums" was now squarely in the public eye.
