= Cathedral of the Nativity of Our Lord, Upper Clapton =

Georgian Orthodox cathedral in London

Coordinates: 51.5734°N 0.0667°W

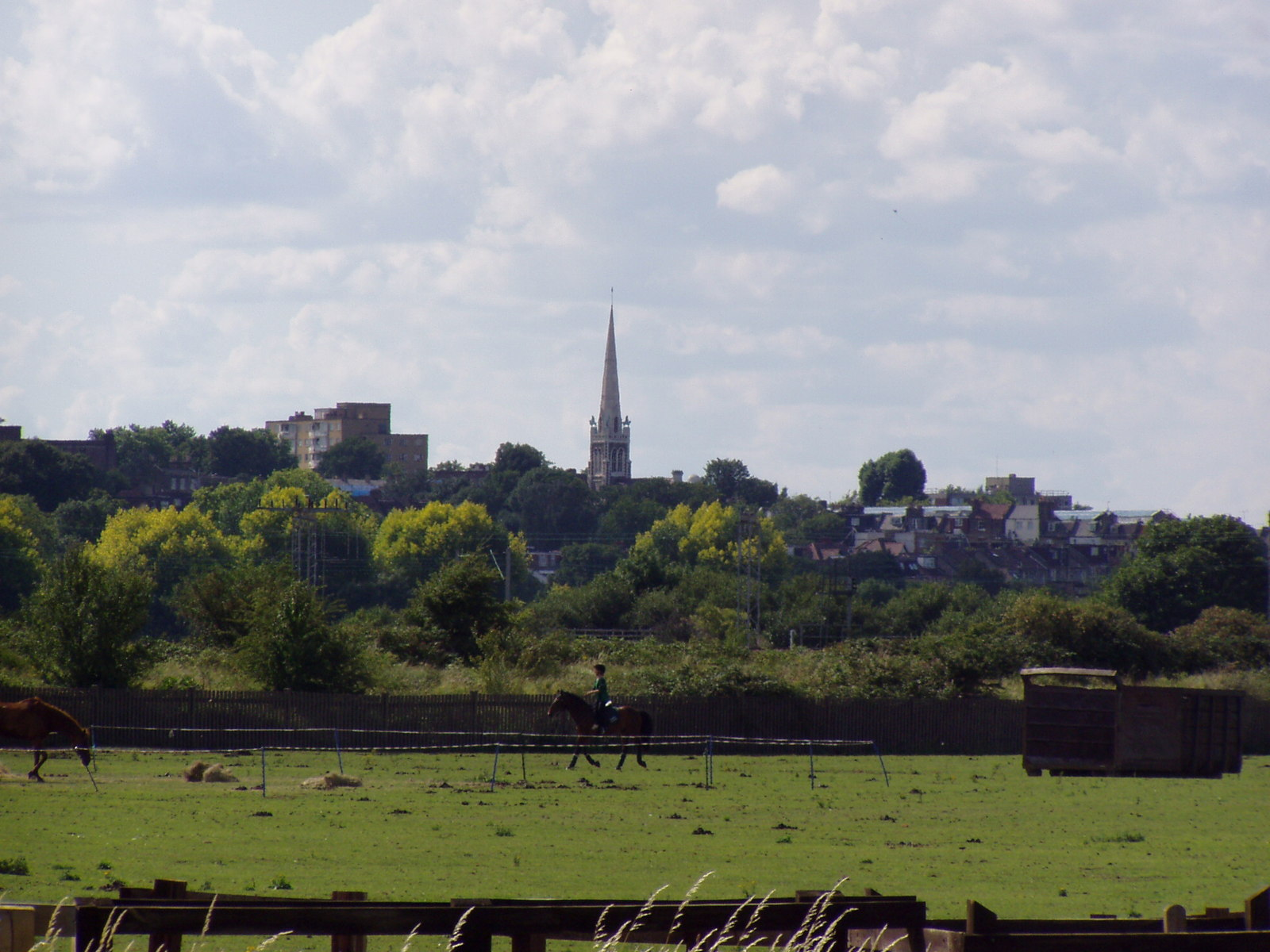
The tower and spire of the church soar above Stamford Hill.

The Cathedral of the Nativity of Our Lord is a Georgian Orthodox church located on the border of Upper Clapton and Stamford Hill in the London Borough of Hackney. Since its opening in 1892 as the Agapemonite Church of the Ark of the Covenant it has served as the sole London outpost of three very different Christian denominations. During the second half of the twentieth century it was the Church of the Good Shepherd and belonged to the Ancient Catholic Church, a now defunct denomination. In 2011 it became a Georgian Orthodox cathedral and gained its current name. It is a Grade II* listed building, in part because of its exceptional Arts and Crafts stained glass windows but also as the former headquarters of a late-Victorian Christian cult.

The church's incumbents have included two patriarchs, an archbishop and a beloved, but the longest tenure of any of its active incumbents has been that of a lady, the Reverend Schroder. It has long served as a local landmark; its tower rises above most of the surrounding buildings and trees, so its entire stone steeple and the unusual statues that surround it are widely visible.

== Location ==
The building is situated on Rookwood Road, a few yards from Clapton Common and adjacent to Stamford Hill Bus Garage. It is sometimes described as being in Upper Clapton and sometimes as being in Stamford Hill. Its spire is a local landmark.

=== Architecture ===
It was built by Joseph Morris and Son of Reading. It is made of stone in the neo-Gothic style and has a capacity of 400. Morris's daughter the architect Violet Morris may have assisted with the design; like her sister the wood carver Olive Morris, she was a resident at the Agapemone.

The tower statuary and at least some internal stone carving were designed by Arthur George Walker, and were considered "accomplished" by English Heritage as part of their rationale for the church's listing. The main external sculpture consists of two sets of the four beasts of the tetramorph – an ox, a lion, an eagle and a winged person – in stone around the entrance and in bronze at the corners of the top of the tower around the base of the spire. These figures have variously been described as symbols of the four evangelists – the winged ox for Luke, the winged lion for Mark, the eagle for John and the winged person or angel for Matthew – or as the four beasts from the Book of Revelation. The bronze versions are on pedestals carved with the words "God is Love", while the stone versions are shown crushing human figures. The Book of Revelation was of especial importance to the Agapemonites as they believed the end of the world was imminent.

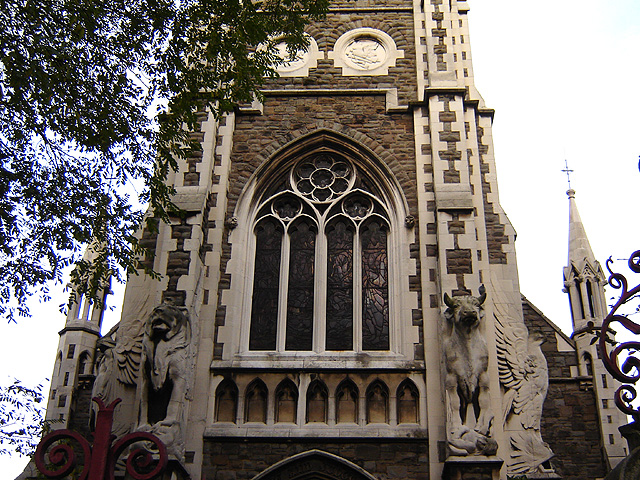
Stone winged lion and bull on either side of the main door

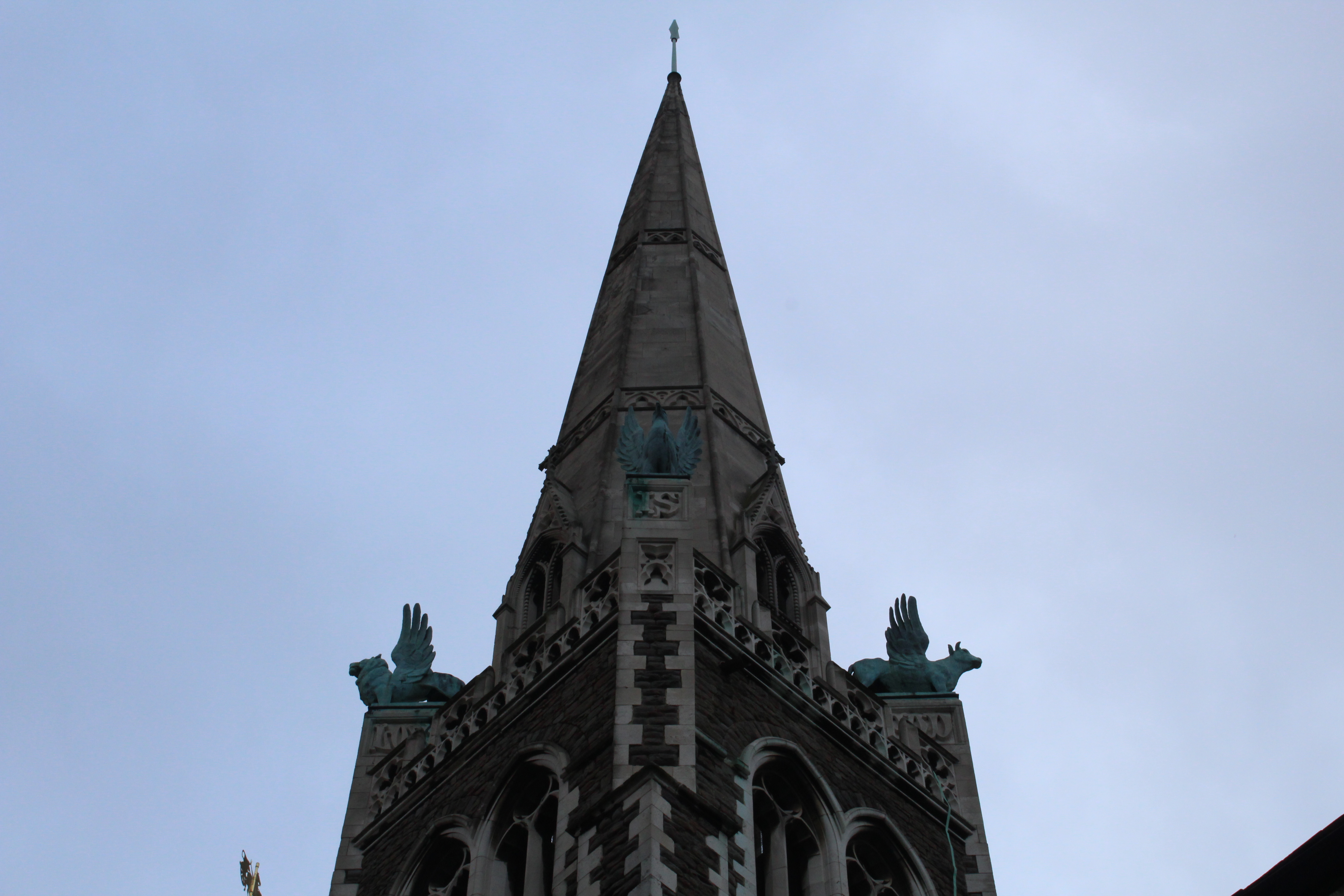
The building is described as "particularly idiosyncratic" by Cherry and Pevsner. Bronze lion and bull at the base of the spire

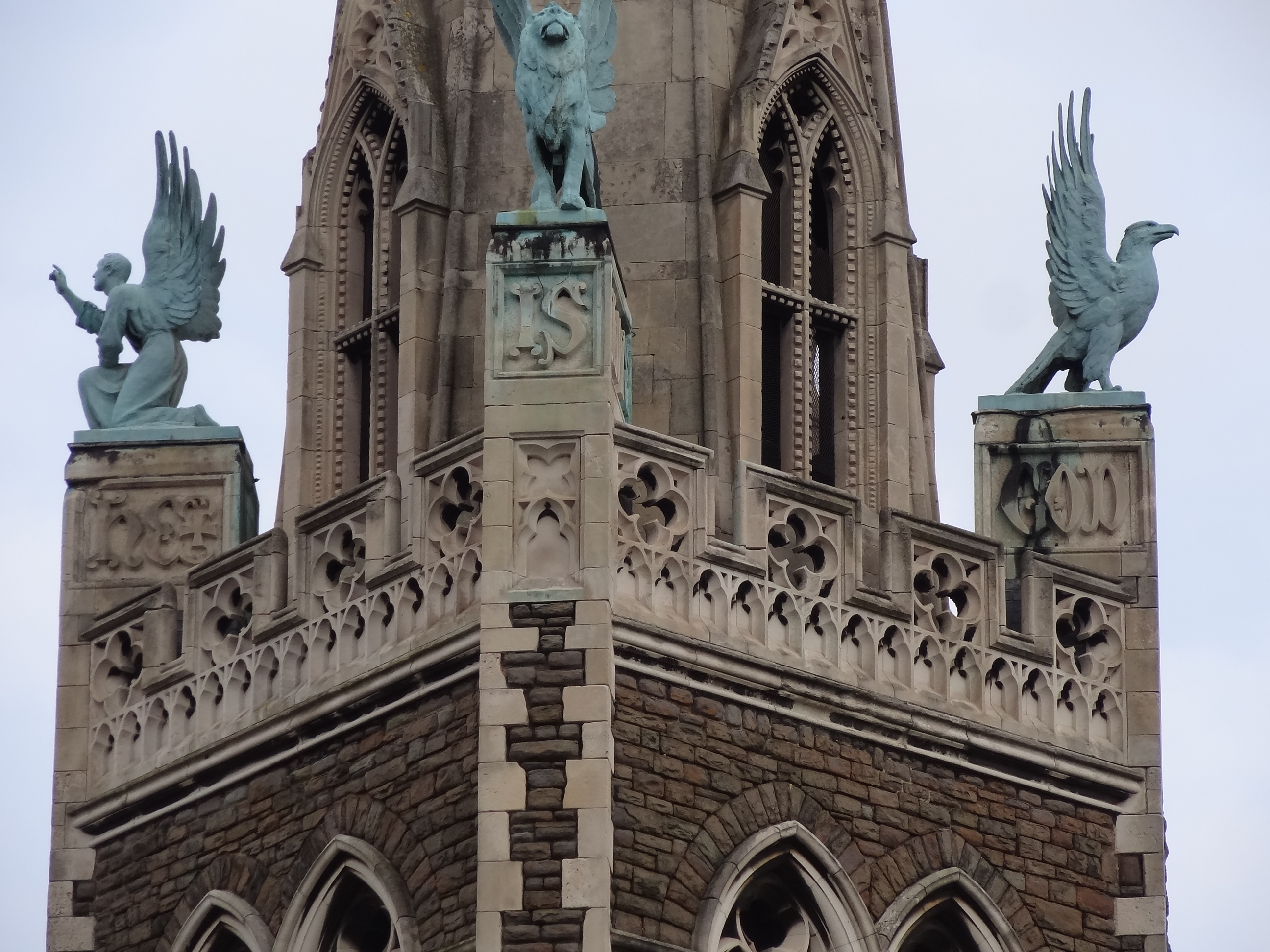
Detailed view of bronze statues at the top of the tower of the Georgian orthodox cathedral, Clapton, UK

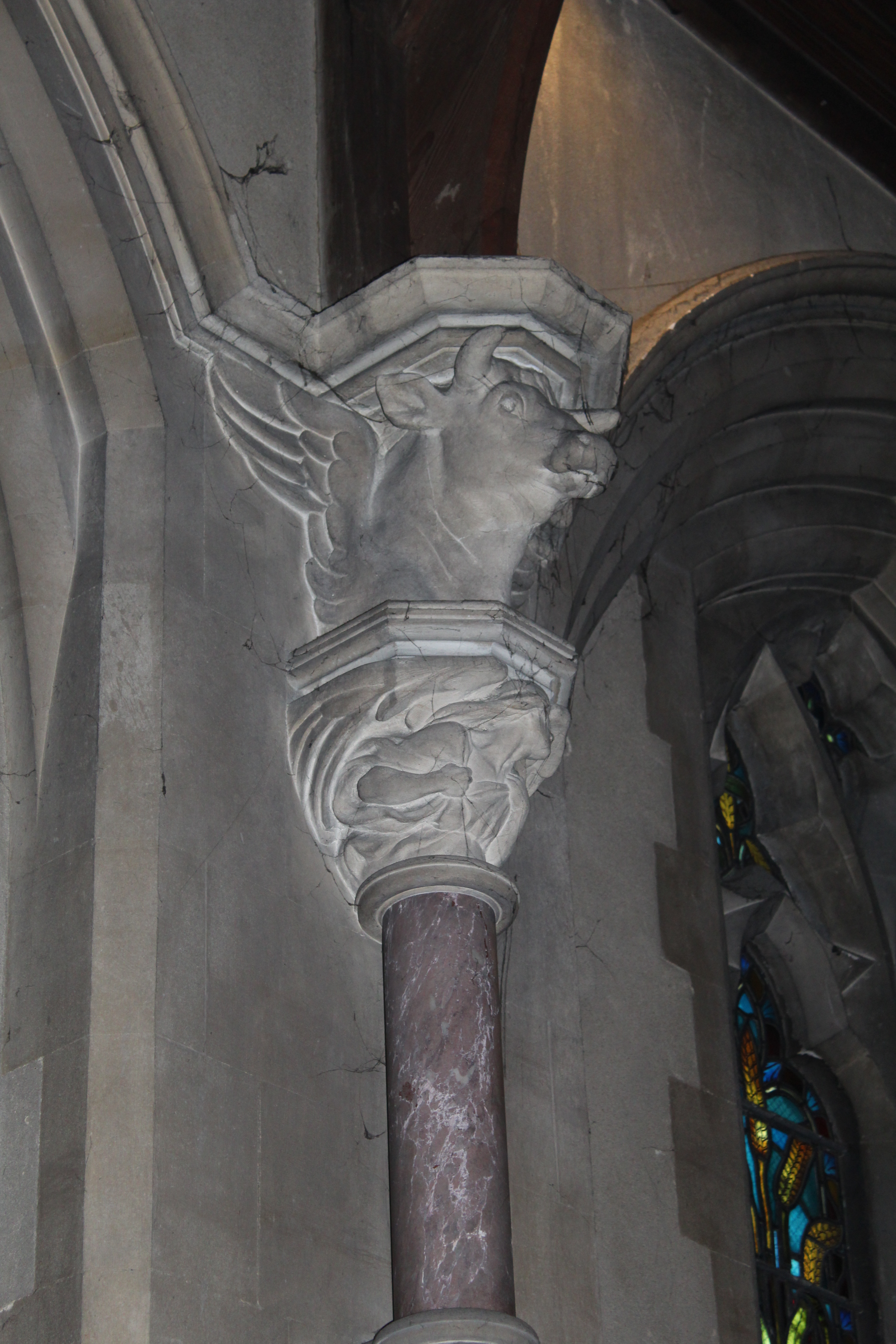
Winged ox on a corbel in the interior

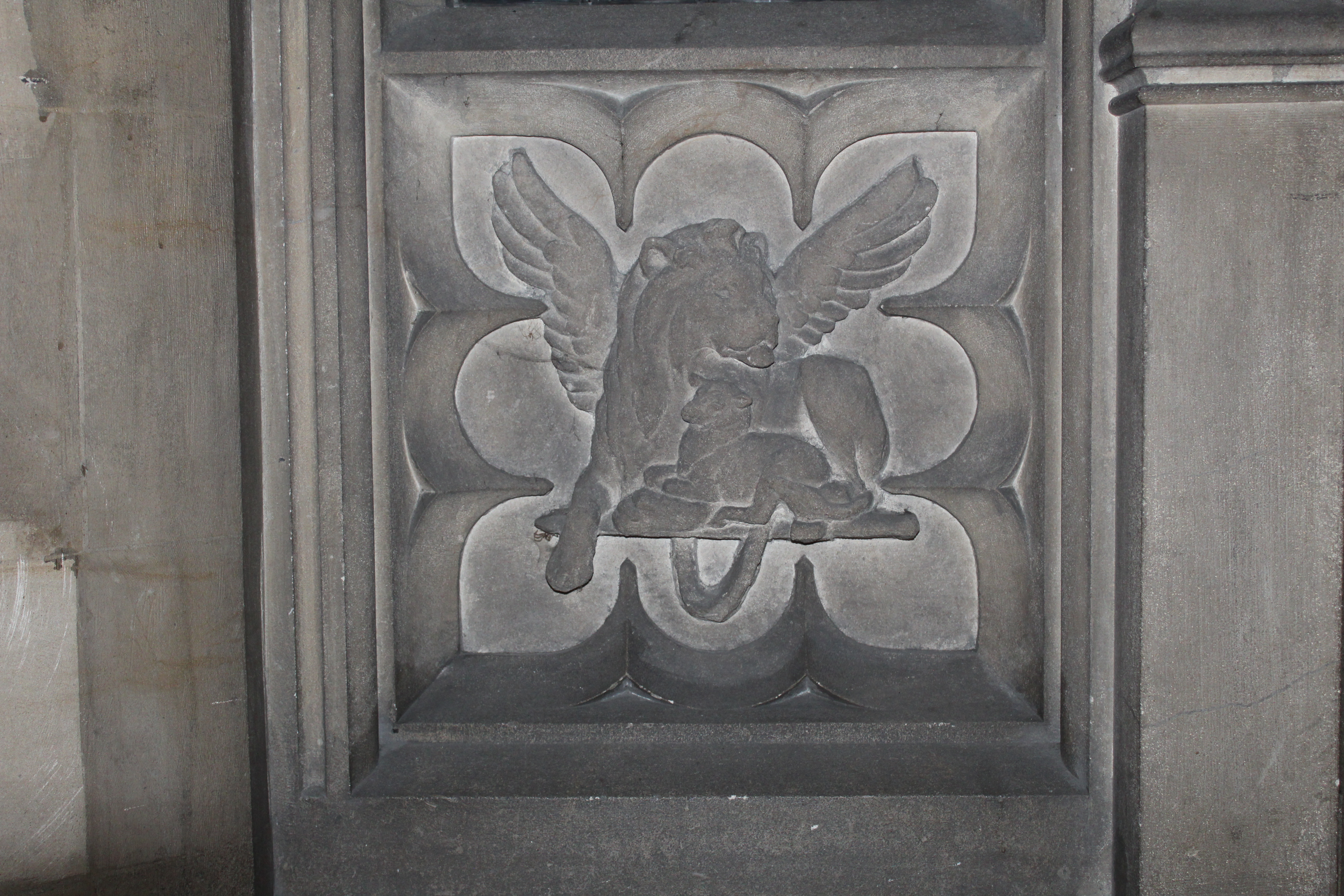
Lion and lamb

==== Enoch and Elijah ====
According to the Old Testament, the Prophets Enoch and Elijah did not die but ascended to Heaven. This had particular significance for the Agapemonites, so they had roundels made both on the outside of the tower and the interior of the church representing the chariot of Elijah and the Book of Enoch. Enoch and Elijah were also depicted in the stained glass of the apse, though this is no longer on public display.

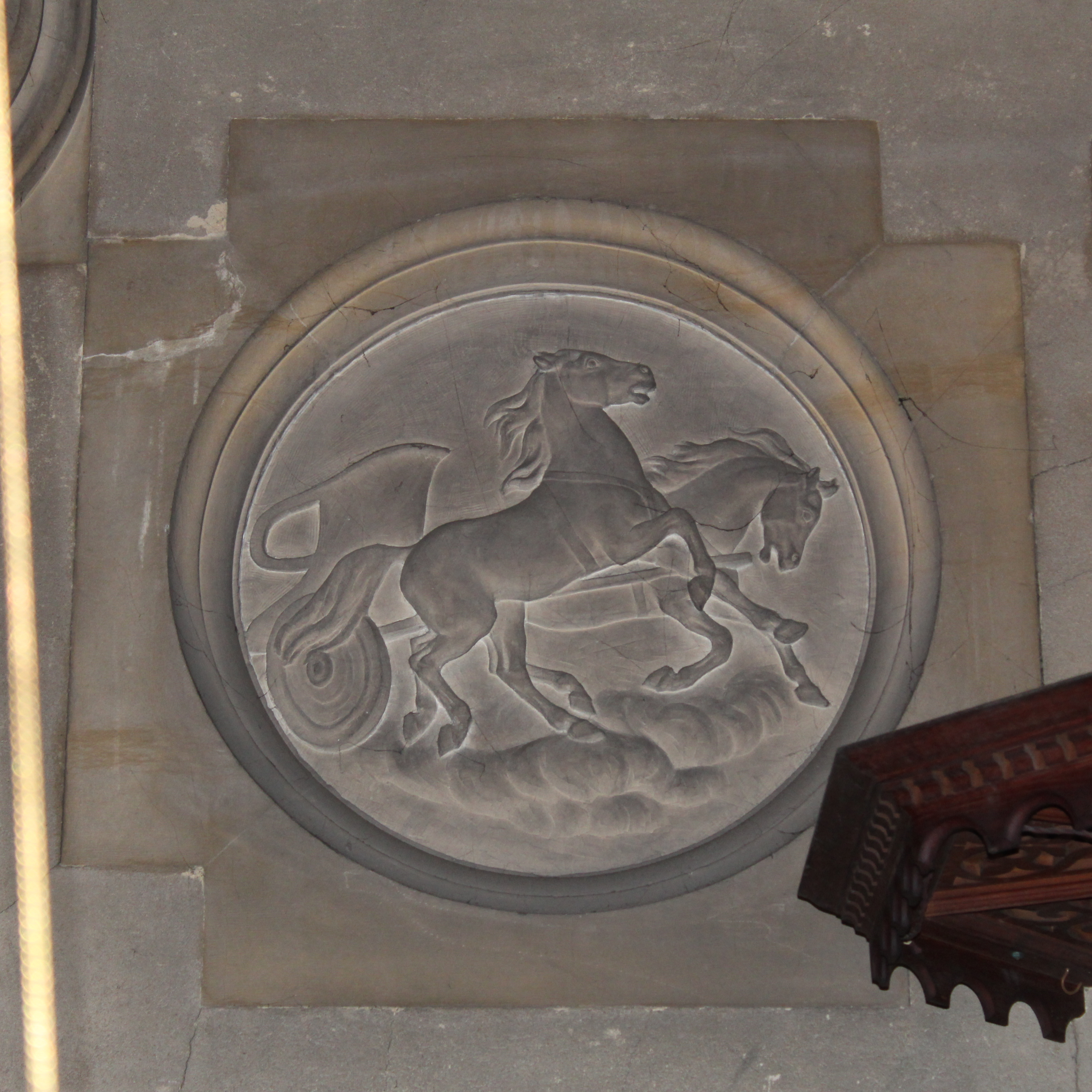
Chariot of Elijah inside the church

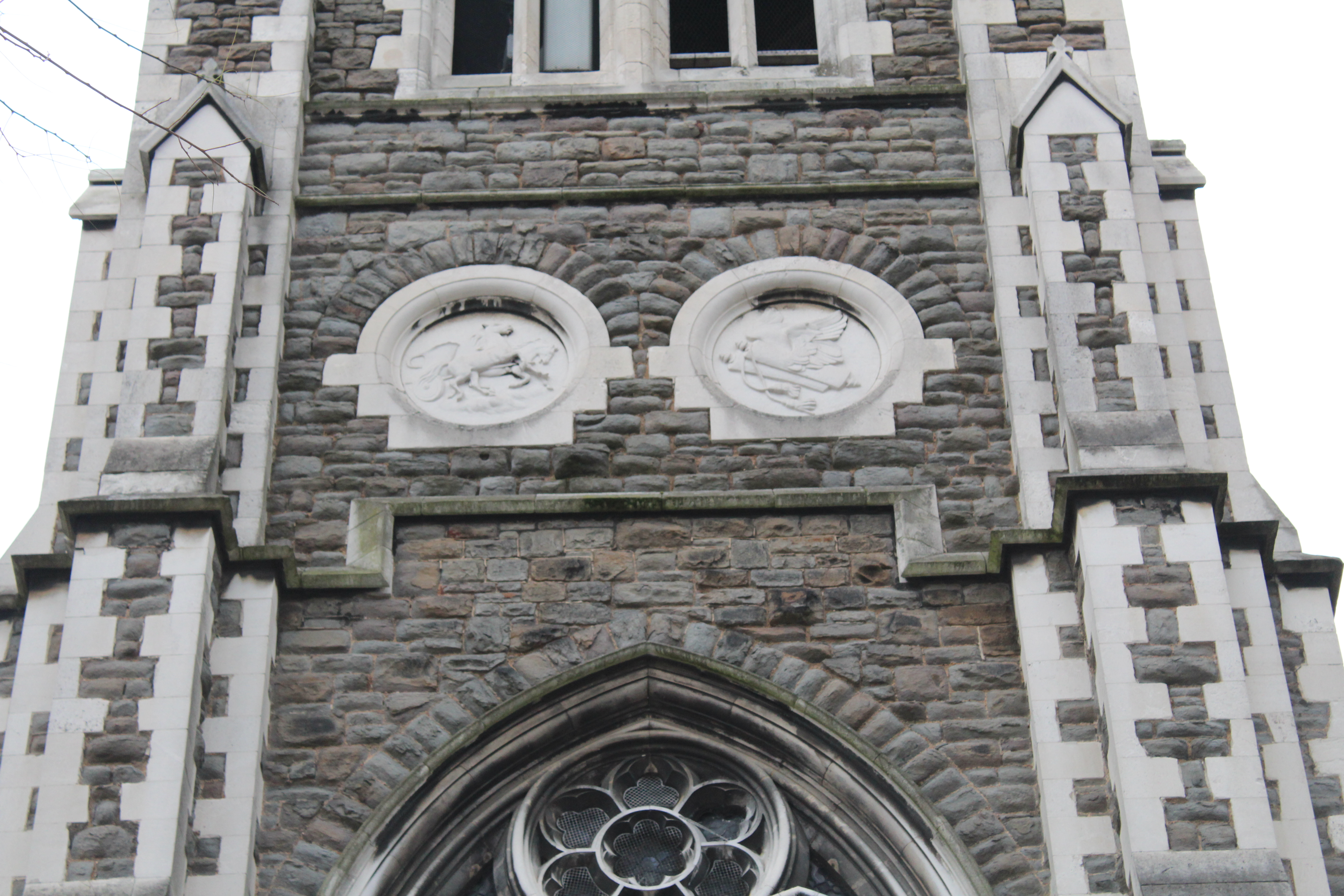
Both roundels on the outside of the tower

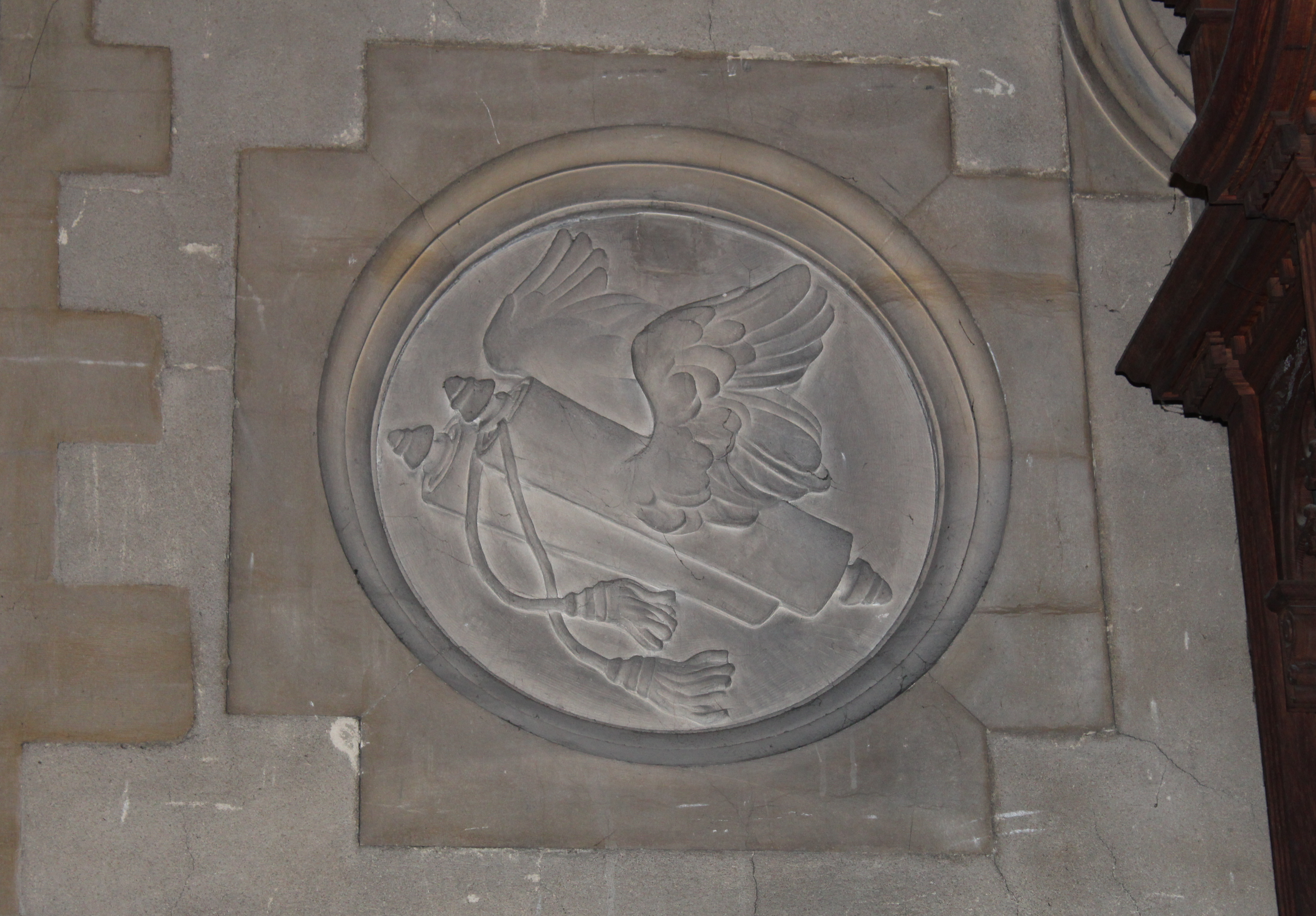
Scroll of Enoch inside the church

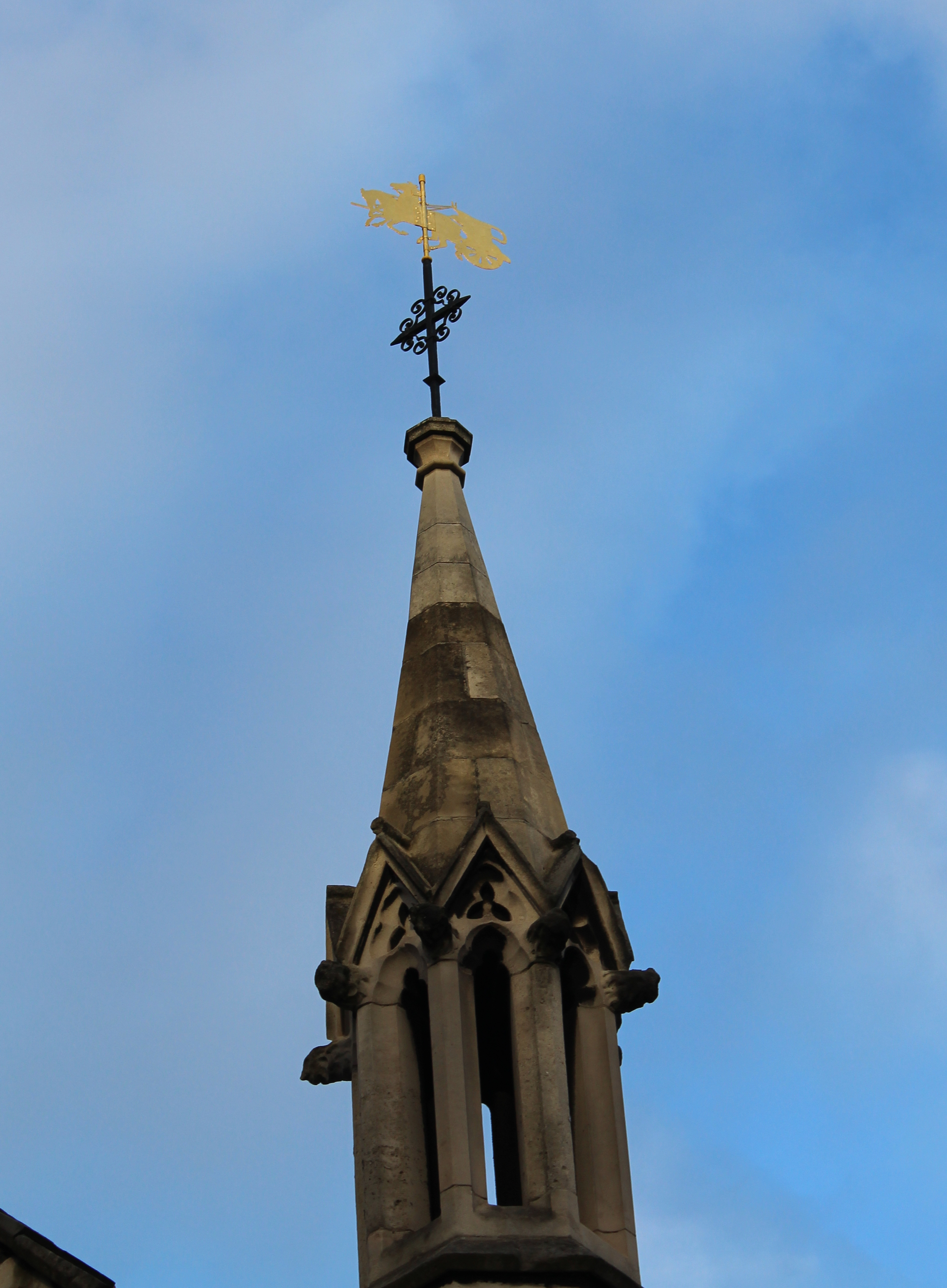
Chariot of Elijah shaped weathervane

=== Stained glass ===
The stained glass windows were designed by the children's book illustrator and member of the Arts and Crafts movement Walter Crane and made by Sylvester Sparrow. This was Crane's first commission for stained glass in Britain and one of Sparrow's first works. These designs are a mixture of Art Nouveau floral works on the side windows and depictions of sin, shame and the rise of the sun of righteousness, whilst in the apse were depicted the translations of Enoch and Elijah. They have been described by English Heritage as Crane's "most significant work in this medium"; it notes in the justification for listing the church at Grade II* that "the stained glass is extraordinary and has more than special interest in the context of Arts and Crafts stained glass". English Heritage also quotes an 1896 review of the glass by The Builder: "it is difficult to write without superlatives; for richness and magnificence of colour we believe it never has been, and is not likely to be, surpassed". John Betjeman later described the glass as "the richest Victorian glass I have ever seen" The stained glass has also been described as "illustrating woman's submission to man".

The sets at the west end depict the end of the world, which the Agapemonites believed was coming at any moment. The side windows contain floral patterns and depict the "new Eden" which they believed was to follow.

==== Millenarian imagery (west end) ====
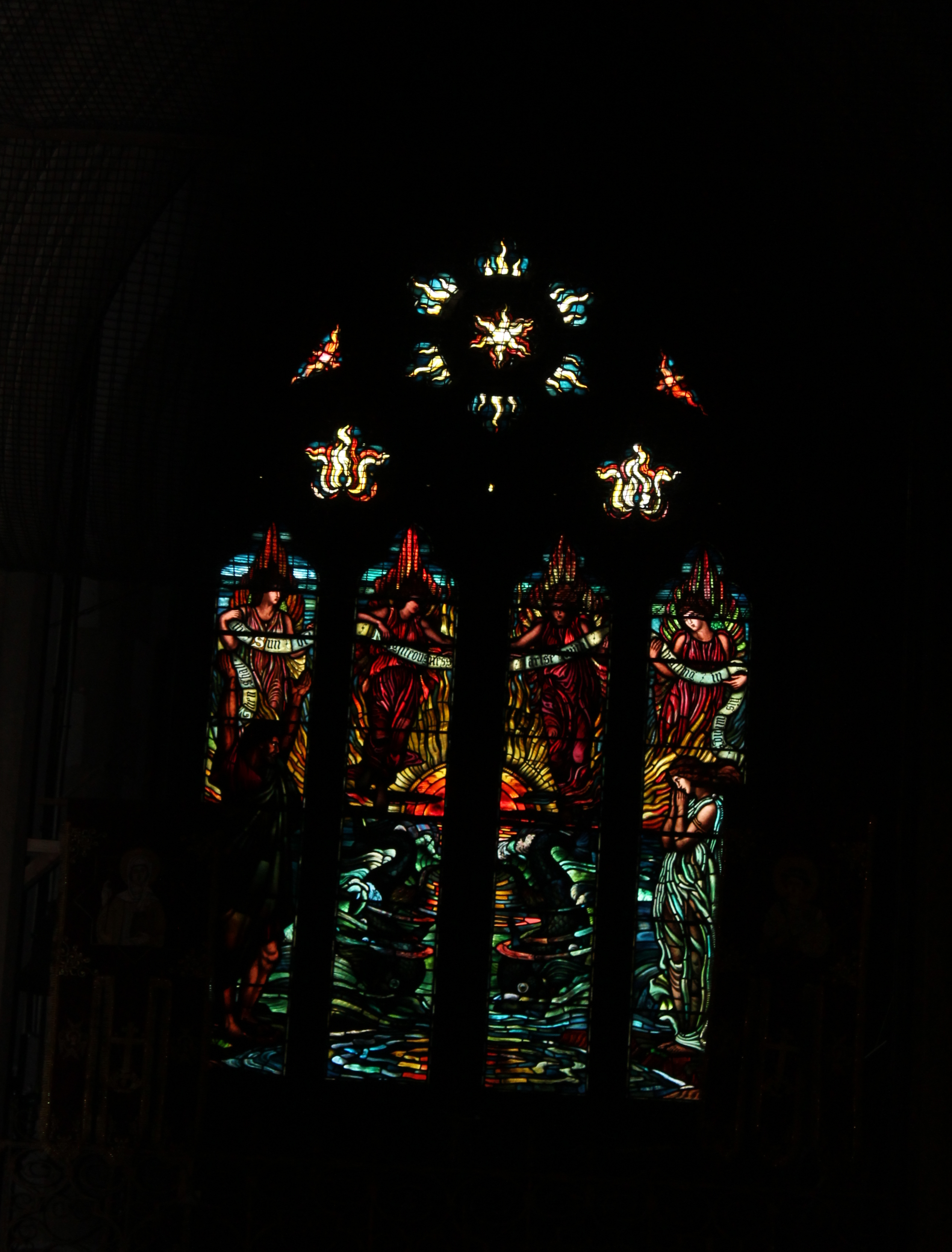
Then shall the Sun of Righteousness arise

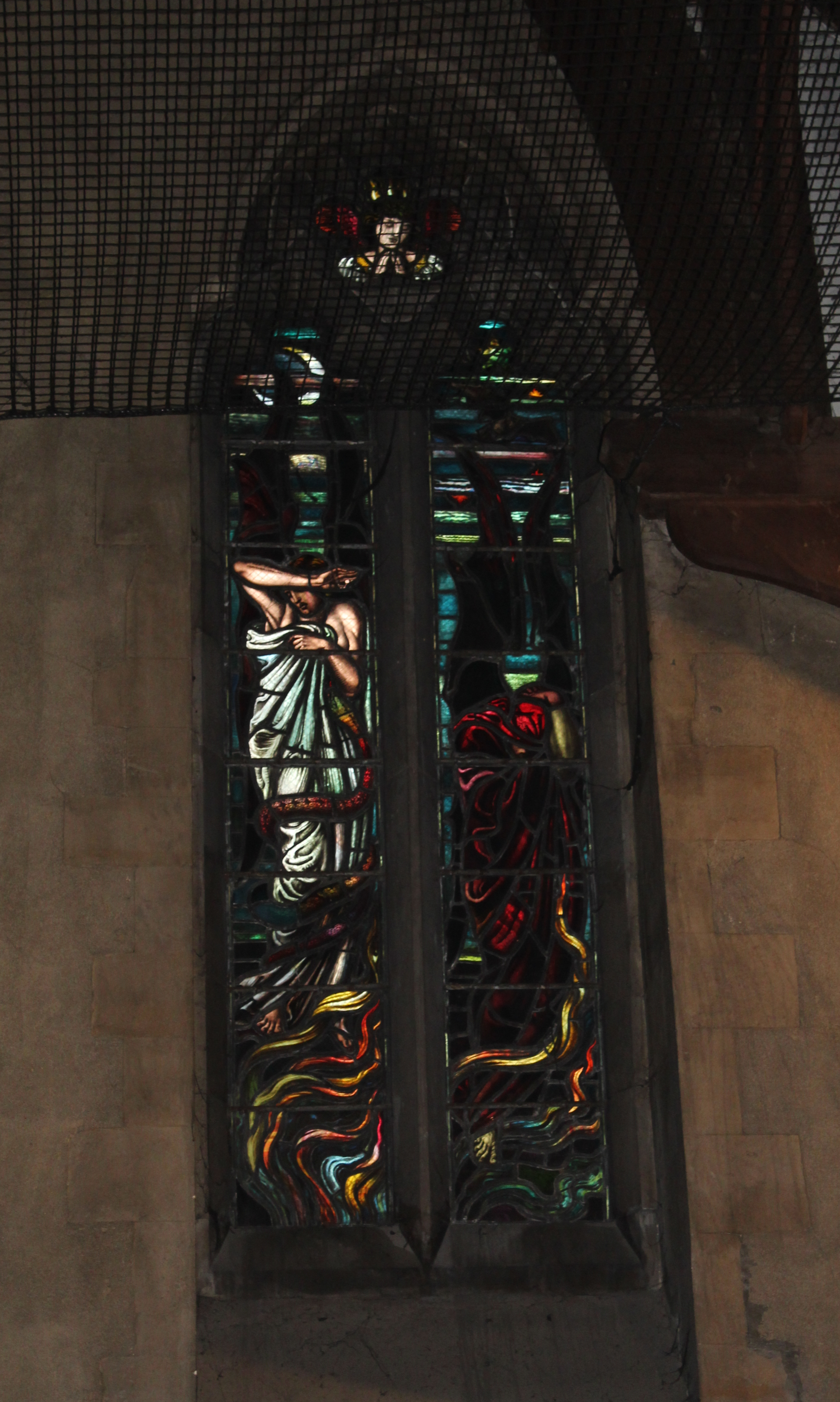
Sin and Shame

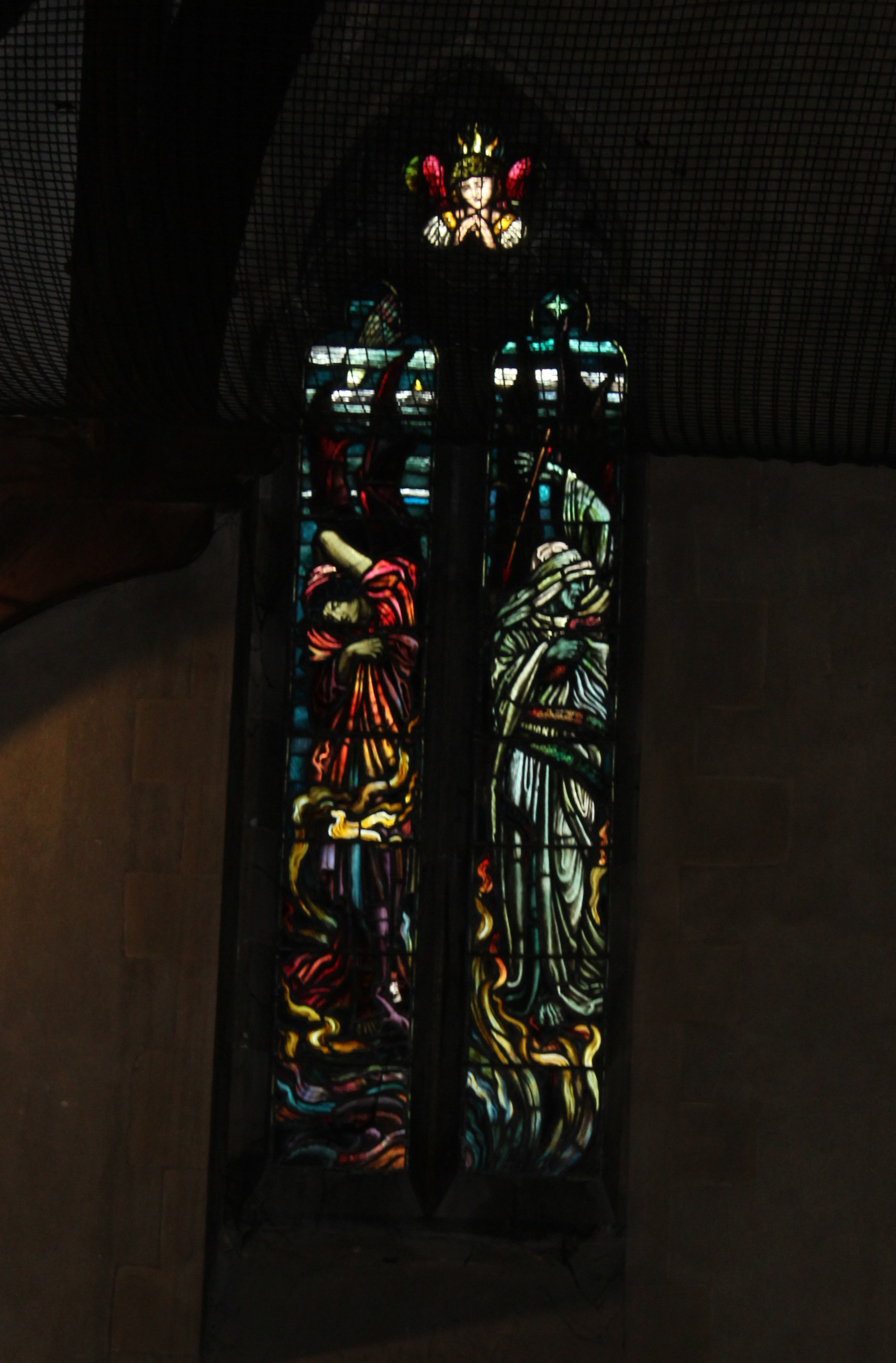
Death and Disease

==== New Eden imagery (side windows) ====
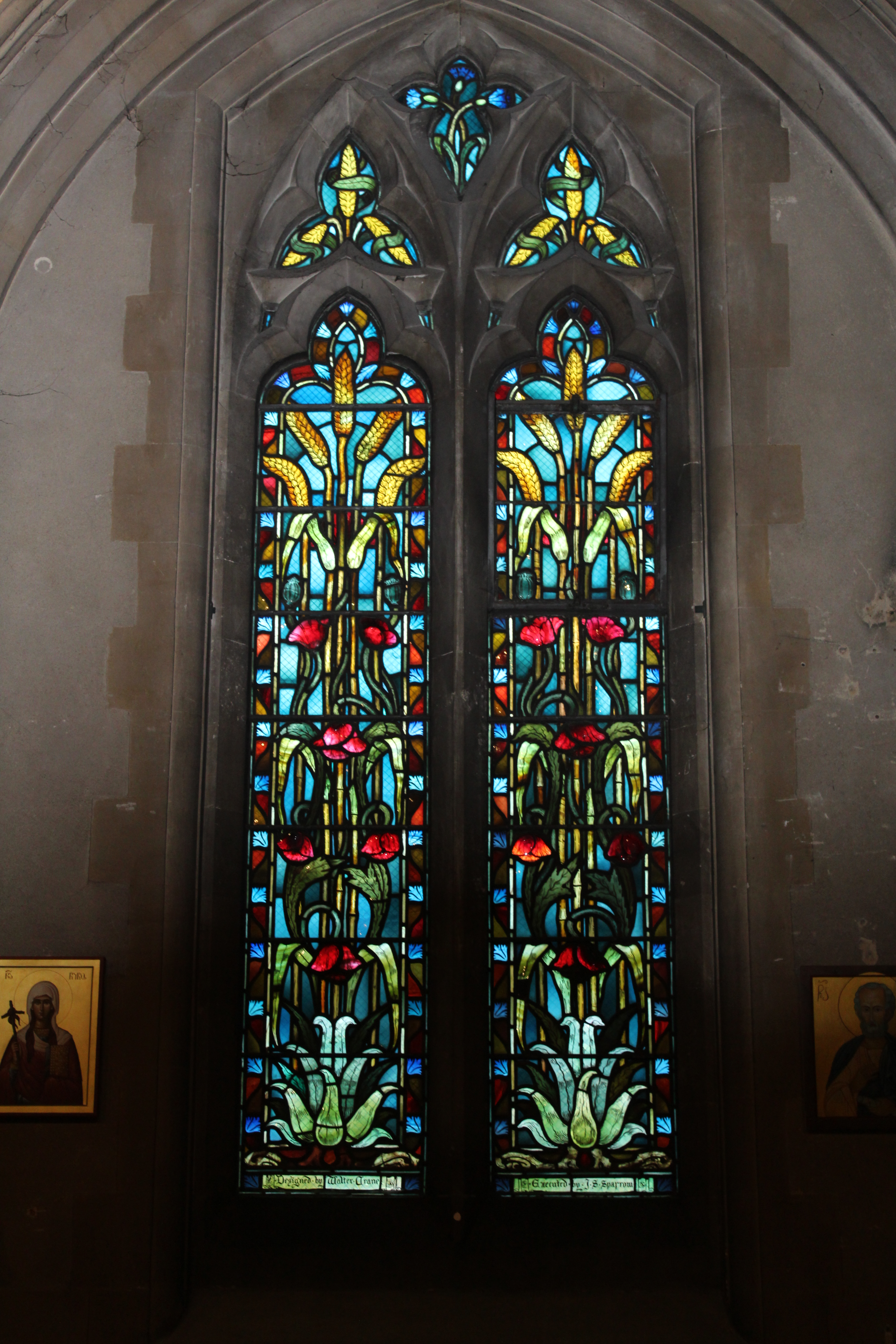
Art Nouveau stained glass in the nave with adjacent Georgian icons.

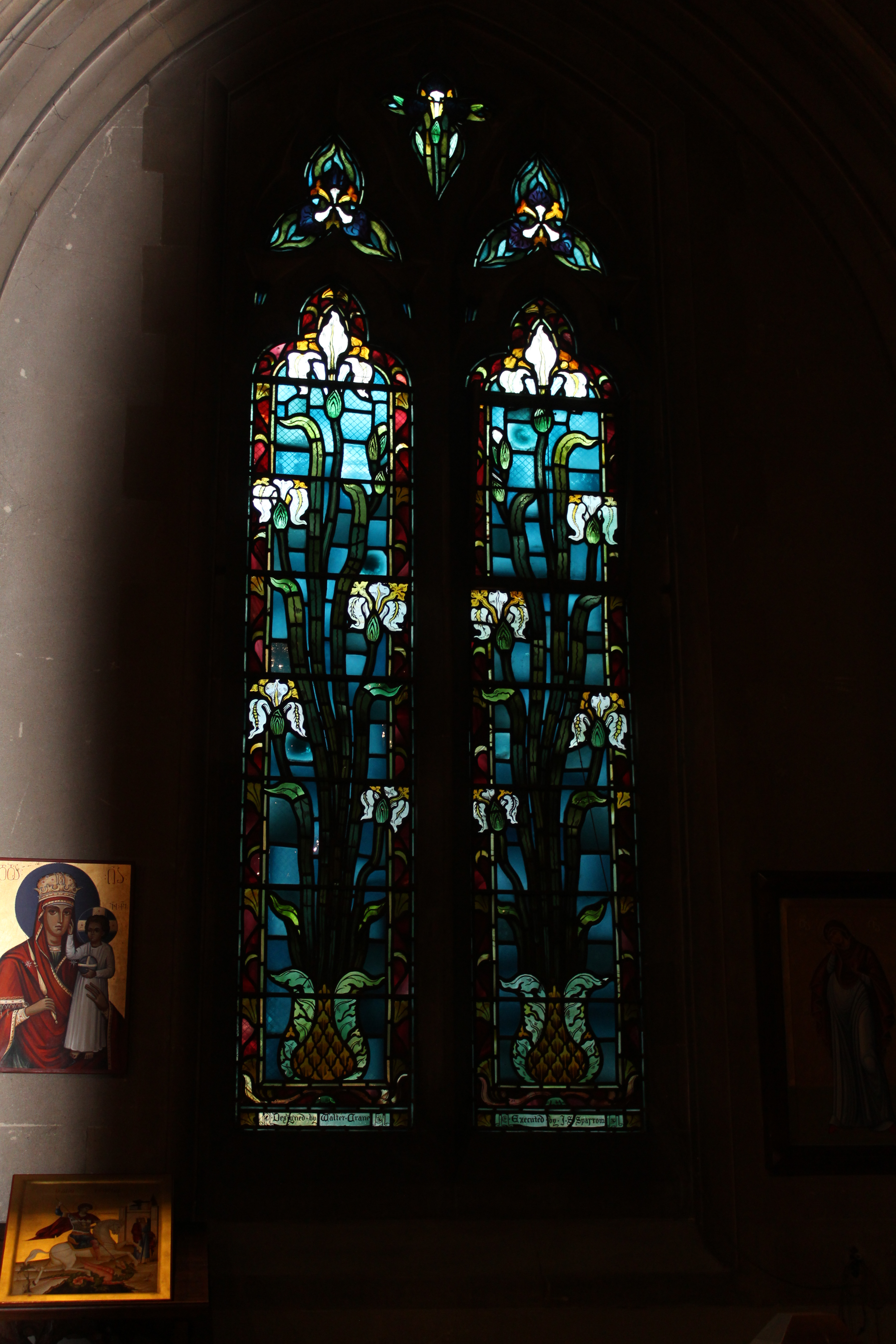

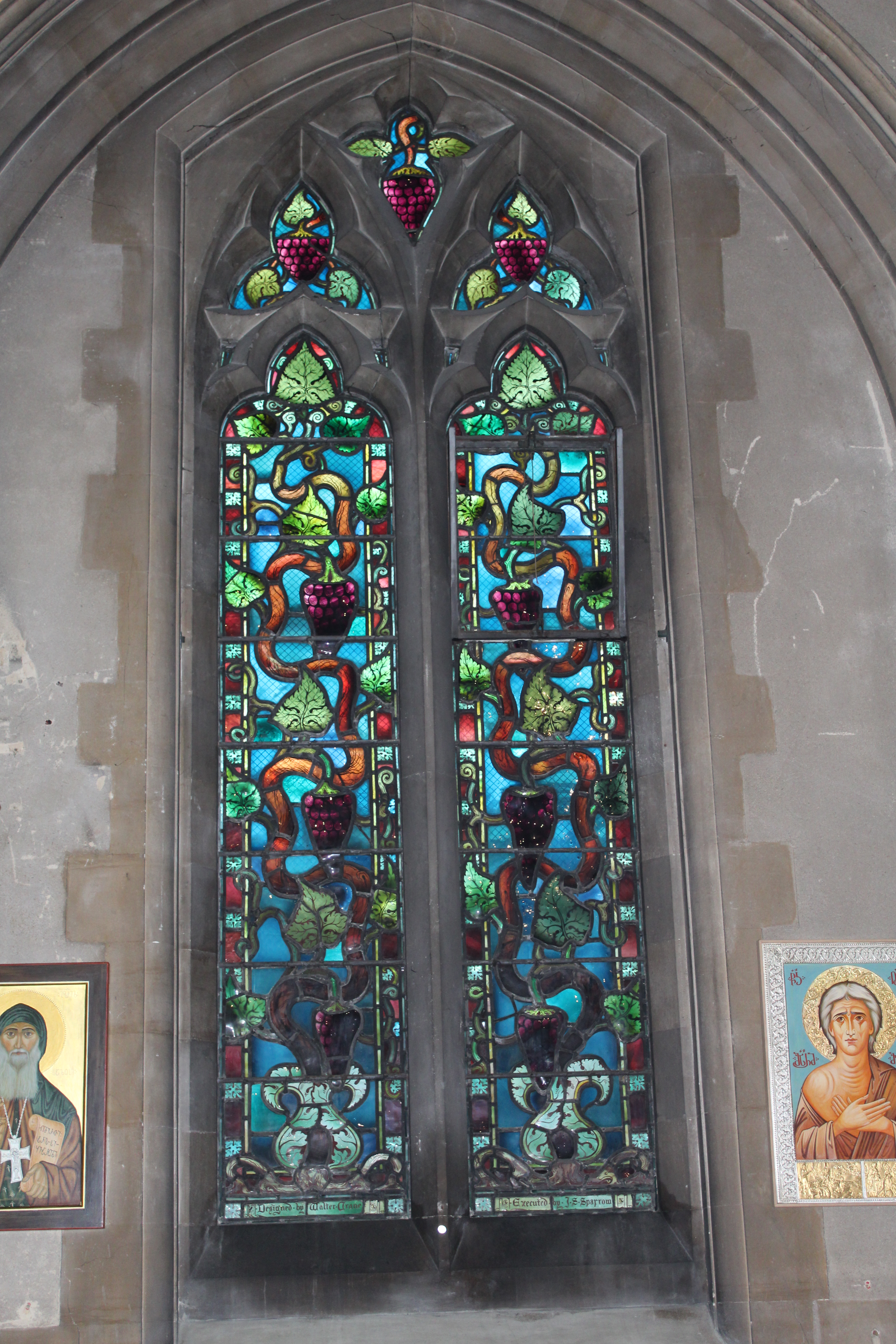

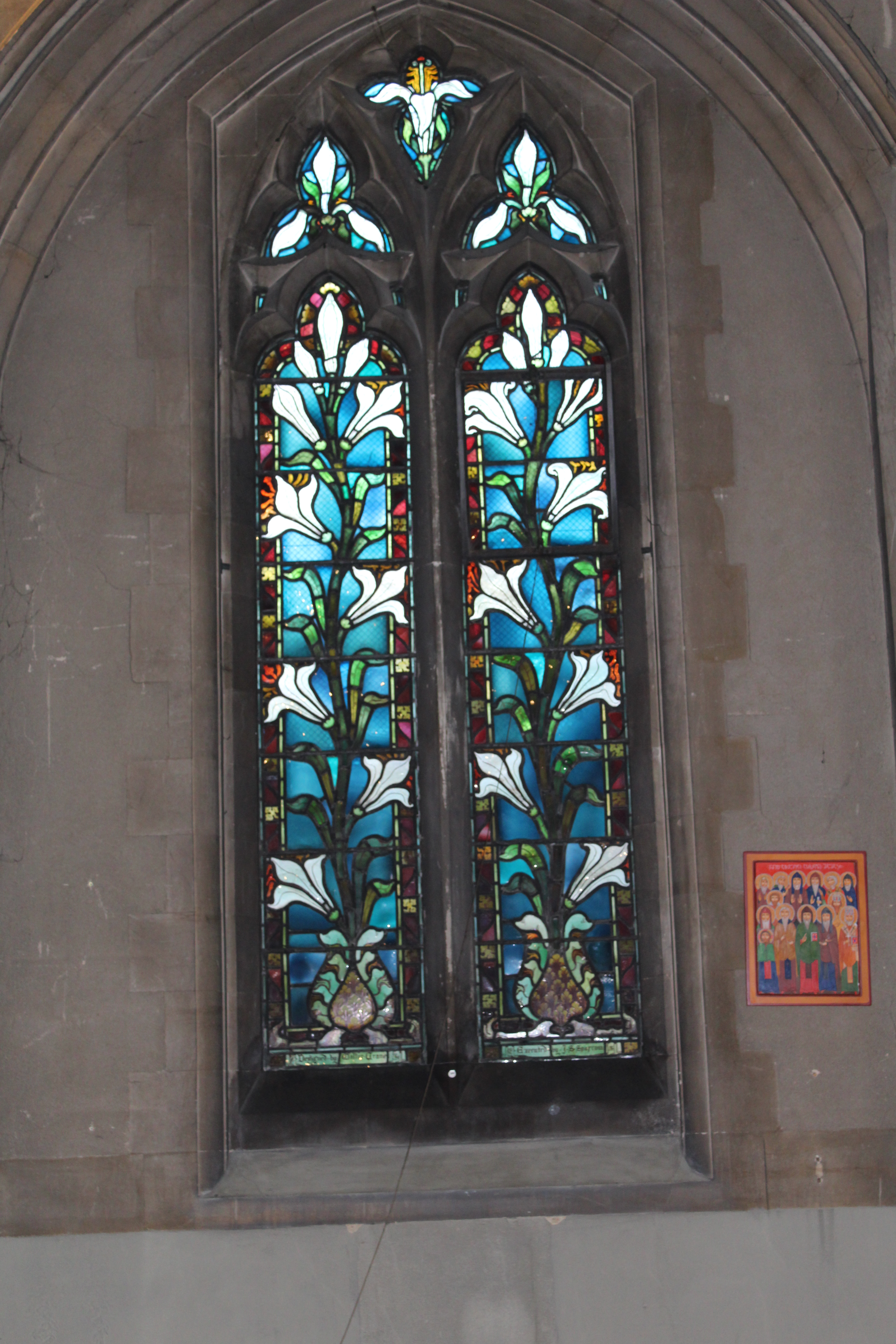
Lilies

=== Wood carvings ===
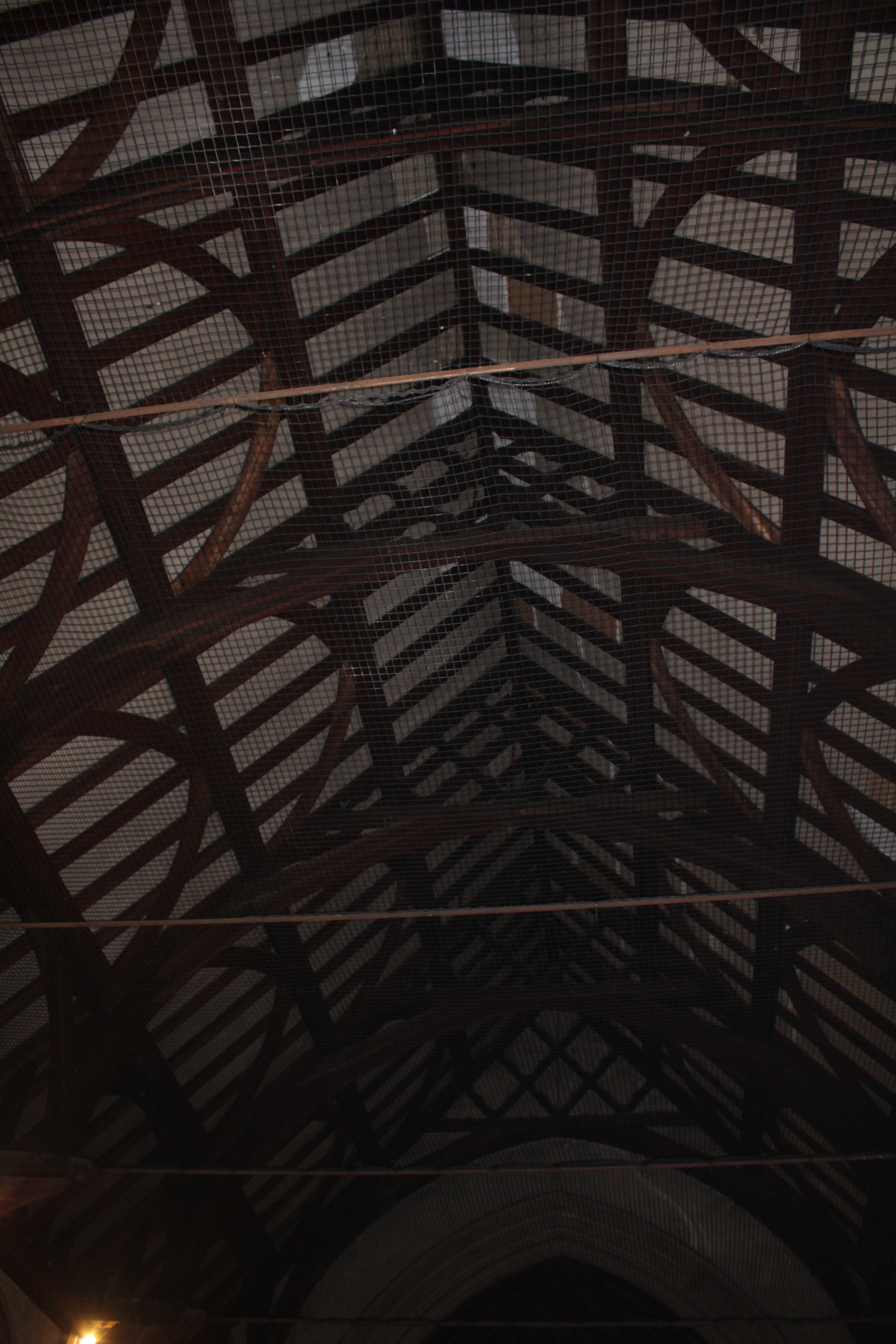
The hammerbeam roof structure, partially obscured by netting

Its hammerbeam roof is described by the English Heritage Trust as "splendid", who noted the benches, lectern and pulpit, and the pulpit's woodcarvings are attributed to Olive Morris, at one time a resident of the Agapemone and daughter of the builder Joseph.

== Church of the Ark of the Covenant ==
The church was built for the Agapemonites between 1892 and 1895 as the London base for their rising star John Smyth-Pigott who became their leader (the beloved) in 1899 after the death of the movement's founder. Aside from the prominent large statuary on and of the tower, an unusual feature of the church interior when it was the Ark of the Covenant was that instead of an altar it had a chair for "the beloved" – Smyth-Pigott.

The Agapemonites were a controversial nineteenth-century religious sect whose leaders had been Anglican ministers, though the sect is not generally considered to be a form of Anglicanism (indeed, Smyth-Pigott was defrocked by the Church of England in 1909, six years after he had declared himself the Messiah). Due to the number of heiresses in their "abode of love" at Spaxton they were unusually well funded. Sources vary as to whether the church cost £15,000 (equivalent to £1,705,262 in 2025) or £20,000 (equivalent to £2,273,682 in 2025) to build, either way it was a lavish sum for that era. The building functioned as centre for the sect for less than a decade; lasting from its opening in 1895 to a controversial announcement by Smyth-Pigott in 1903.

In 1903 (or September 1902 according to English Heritage) Smyth-Pigott had to be protected by the police from a mob of thousands after he had declared himself to be Jesus Christ but declined to walk over Clapton Pond. He took refuge in the Agapemonite community in Spaxton and died there in 1927, he was buried in the grounds, and his grave was left open for some time in the expectation of his resurrection. As none of his grandchildren were willing to continue his ministry, the church steadily dwindled and the last of the ladies in the abode of love died in 1956. Sources vary as to whether the church was completely disused for the half-century between the events of 1903 and the arrival of the Ancient Catholic Church in 1956, or whether some of the London Agapemonites had continued for a time to discreetly meet in the church's basement.

== Church of the Good Shepherd, Upper Clapton ==
From 1956 to 2007 the building was used by "the Ancient Catholic Church" and the building was known as the Church of the Good Shepherd. The church was founded by Harry Nicholson, a priest and later Primate of the Catholic Apostolic Church. Nicholson had left the Apostolic church before he moved into the then disused Agapemonite church in 1956; he continued as Primate until his death in 1968. His successor as Primate was a Mr Schroder who continued the church until his death in 1985. The third and final leader of the Ancient Catholic Church was Mr Schroder's widow Pamela Schroder who, as Reverend Schroder, led the church for another 22 years until her own death. After Reverend Schroder's death a court case ruled that the church had in effect ceased with her death, and no longer existed to be the beneficiary of her will. So the Ancient Catholic Church was dissolved, and the days of the building's dedication to the Good Shepherd ended soon after.

== Cathedral of the Nativity of Our Lord ==
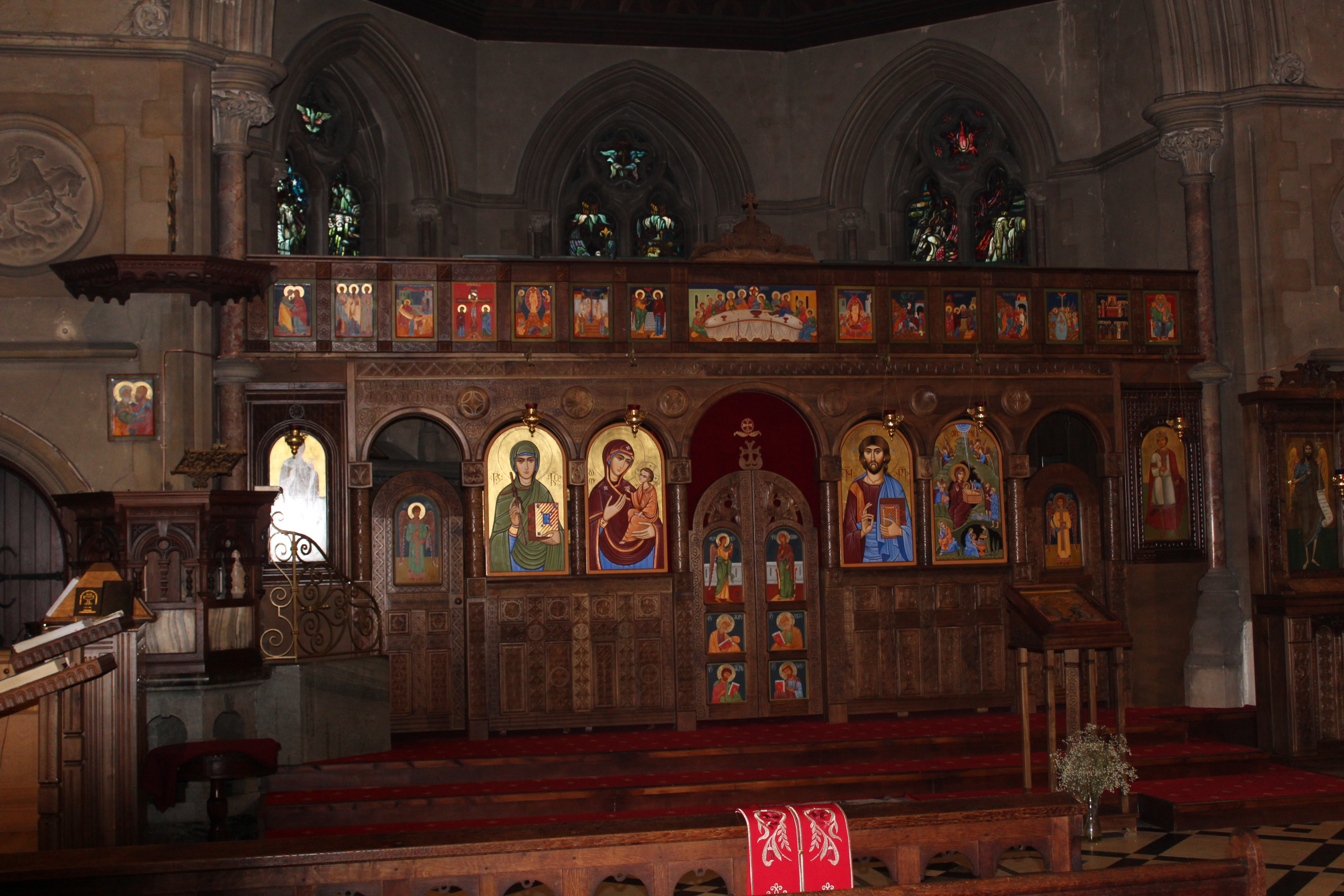
Georgian Orthodox iconostasis with a glimpse of Arts and Crafts stained glass behind.

The building became a Georgian Orthodox Cathedral in 2011 and was renamed The Cathedral of the Nativity of Our Lord. It serves as the cathedral for the Georgian Orthodox Eparchy of Great Britain and Ireland.

Most of the original features from the 1890s are still there, but an iconostasis bearing many Georgian icons shields the altar from public view, and with it some of the glass is hidden. It is reasonable to assume that an altar has replaced "The Beloved's" chair; this is quite likely to have occurred during the occupancy of the Ancient Catholic Church.
