= Agapemonites =

Christian religious group in England from 1846 to 1956

- Community of The Son of Man
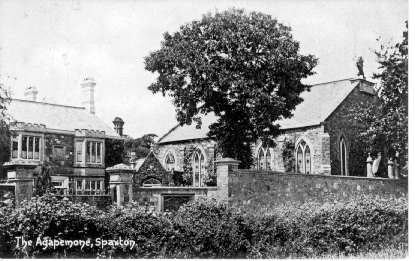
- A 1907 postcard of the Agapemone, Spaxton, Somerset
- Founded: 1846
- Founder: Henry Prince
- Dissolved: 1956
- Type: Religious sect
- Headquarters: Spaxton, Somerset, England
- Coordinates: 51.1279°N 3.0972°W
- Members: 100–500

The Agapemonites or Community of The Son of Man was a religious cult or sect that existed in England from 1846 to 1956. It was named from the Greek: agapemone meaning "abode of love". The Agapemone community was founded by the Reverend Henry Prince in Spaxton, Somerset. The sect also built a church in Upper Clapton, London, and briefly had bases in Stoke-by-Clare in Suffolk, Brighton and Weymouth.

The ideas of the community were based on the theories of various German religious mystics and its primary object was the spiritualisation of the matrimonial state. The Church of England had dismissed Prince earlier in his career for his radical teachings. The Agapemonites predicted the imminent return of Jesus Christ. According to newspaper accounts, Prince's successor, John Hugh Smyth-Pigott, declared himself Jesus Christ's reincarnation.

The Agapemone community consisted mostly of wealthy unmarried women. Both Prince and Smyth-Pigott took many spiritual brides. Later investigations have shown that these "brides" were not solely spiritual and that some produced illegitimate children. In 1860, Prince lost a lawsuit brought on behalf of Louisa Nottidge by the Nottidge family and the group vanished from the public eye. It finally closed in 1956 when the last member died.

== Henry James Prince ==
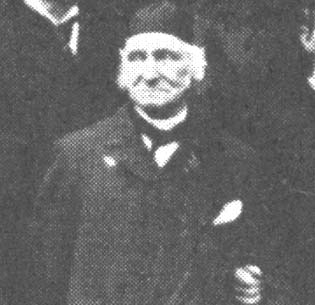
Henry Prince

Henry James Prince, baptised on 21 February 1811, was the son of Thomas and Mary Ann Prince of Lyncombe and Widcombe, Bath. He studied medicine at Guy's Hospital, obtained his qualifications in 1832, and was appointed medical officer to the General Hospital in Bath, his native city. Compelled by ill health to abandon his profession, in 1837 Prince entered himself as a student at St David's College, Lampeter (now the Lampeter campus of the University of Wales Trinity Saint David), where he gathered about him a band of earnest religious enthusiasts known as the Lampeter Brethren. The vice principal of the college contacted the Bishop of Bath and Wells who, in 1840, installed Prince as the curate of Charlinch in Somerset, where he had sole charge during the illness and absence of the rector, Samuel Starkey.

Attendances at the church were small until, during one of the services, Prince acted as if he was possessed, throwing himself around the church. Congregations grew each week as the "possession" was repeated. The congregation was then divided with separate services for men and women. Subsequently, he separated them again into sinners and the righteous, the latter of which generally included women who were wealthy. The bishop was summoned to investigate the practices. By that time, Prince had contracted his first "spiritual marriage" and had persuaded himself that he had been absorbed into the personality of God and become a visible embodiment of the Holy Spirit. During his illness, Starkey read one of his curate's sermons, and was not only "cured" forthwith, but embraced his strange doctrines. Together, they procured many conversions in the countryside and the neighbouring towns. In the end, the rector was deprived of his living and Prince was defrocked. Together with a few disciples, they started the Charlinch Free Church, which had a very brief existence, meeting in a supportive farmer's barn.

Prince used money inherited on the death of his first wife, Martha, to marry Julia Starkey, the sister of the rector. They all moved to Stoke-by-Clare in Suffolk where Prince started again to build a congregation, which grew over the subsequent one to two years. The Bishop of Ely then expelled them. Prince opened Adullam Chapel, which was also known as Cave Adullam, in the North Laine area of Brighton. Meanwhile, Starkey established himself at Weymouth. Their chief success lay in the latter town, and Prince soon moved there.

== Followers ==
A number of followers, estimated by Prince at 500 but by his critics at one fifth of the number, were gathered together, and it was given out by "Beloved" or "The Lamb" (the names by which the Agapemonites designated their leader) that his disciples must divest themselves of their possessions and throw them into the common stock. This was done, even by the poor, all of whom looked forward to the speedy end of the present dispensation and were content, for the short remainder of this world, to live in common and, while not repudiating earthly ties, to treat them as purely spiritual. With the money thus obtained the house at Spaxton that was to become the "Abode of Love" was enlarged and furnished luxuriously, and the three Nottidge sisters, who contributed £6,000 each, were immediately married to three of Prince's nearest disciples. Agnes, the eldest of the Nottidge sisters, objected to the spiritual marriage which entailed a celibate life and, as one writer reports, became pregnant by another member of the community; however, it is unlikely that she committed adultery because her husband never accused her, and she later gained sole custody of their child in 1850 after proving herself of good moral character before a court. Agnes wrote to her younger sister Louisa Nottidge warning her not to come to Spaxton. Despite this Louisa travelled to Somerset to join them. Her mother Emily feared the spiritual and financial influence that Prince had established over her daughters. Emily instructed her son Edmund, her nephew Edward Nottidge, and her son-in-law, Frederick Ripley, to travel down to Somerset and to rescue her unmarried daughter, Louisa, after her arrival. The three men succeeded in removing Louisa against her will in November 1846, and imprisoned her in 12 Woburn Place, a villa by Regents Park.

Following Louisa's persistent claims regarding the divinity of Henry Prince, her mother enlisted medical aid and had Louisa certified insane and then placed her in Moorcroft House Asylum, Hillingdon. Her treatment and forced incarceration in the asylum have remained of interest with respect to the rights of psychiatric patients; Dr Arthur Stillwell, the presiding physician, made notes on Louisa's condition and treatment, recorded in The Lancet. Louisa escaped from the asylum in January 1848, travelling across London to meet the Reverend William Cobbe from The Agapemone at a hotel in Cavendish Square, but was recaptured two days later at Paddington railway station. Cobbe alerted the Commissioners in Lunacy, whose report by Bryan Procter led to her release in May 1848. Louisa then sued her brother, cousin, and brother-in-law, Frederick Ripley, for abduction and false imprisonment in Nottidge v. Ripley and Another (1849); the trial was reported daily in The Times newspaper. Louisa Nottidge returned to Spaxton and spent the rest of her life as one of the Agapemonites. In 1860 Louisa's brother, Ralph Nottidge, sued Prince to recoup the money that Louisa had given him as a result of his undue influence over her, in the case of Nottidge v. Prince (1860). The Nottidges won the case, with costs.

In 1856, a few years after the establishment of the "Abode of Love", Prince and Zoe Patterson, one of his virginal female followers, engaged in public ceremonial sexual intercourse on a billiard table in front of a large audience. The scandal led to the secession of some of his most faithful friends, who were unable any longer to endure what they regarded as the amazing mixture of blasphemy and immorality offered for their acceptance. The most prominent of those who remained received such titles as the "Anointed Ones", the "Angel of the Last Trumpet", the "Seven Witnesses" and so forth.

== Spaxton ==
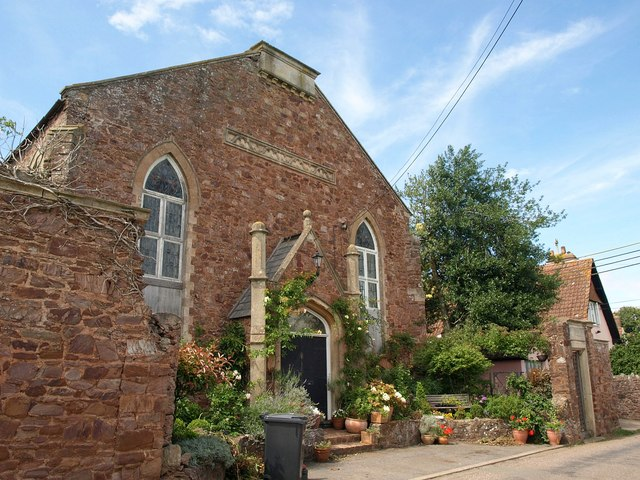
The Agapemone Chapel in Spaxton (2010).

Extensive building work was undertaken to accommodate members and followers at Four Forks in Spaxton, to which Prince and his followers moved in the summer of 1846. Behind 15-foot (4.6 m) high walls were built a 20-bedroom house and attached chapel, as well as a gazebo, stables, and cottages, all set within landscaped gardens. The buildings were designed by William Cobbe. The buttressed chapel, with its pinnacles and stained glass, was completed in 1845; today, together with the attached house, it is a Grade II listed building.

In 1899, Prince died at the age of 88. His followers buried Prince in the grounds of the chapel, with his coffin positioned vertically so that he would be standing on the day of his resurrection.

In the early 20th century, a number of houses (some in the Arts and Crafts style) were built at Four Forks by members of the Agapemonites, including Joseph Morris and his daughter Violet.

Since closure of the community, the chapel has been used as a studio for the production of children's television programmes, including Trumpton and Camberwick Green. The complex of buildings became known as Barford Gables and was put on the market in 1997. The chapel received planning permission for conversion into a residential house and was put on the market again in 2004.

== Upper Clapton ==
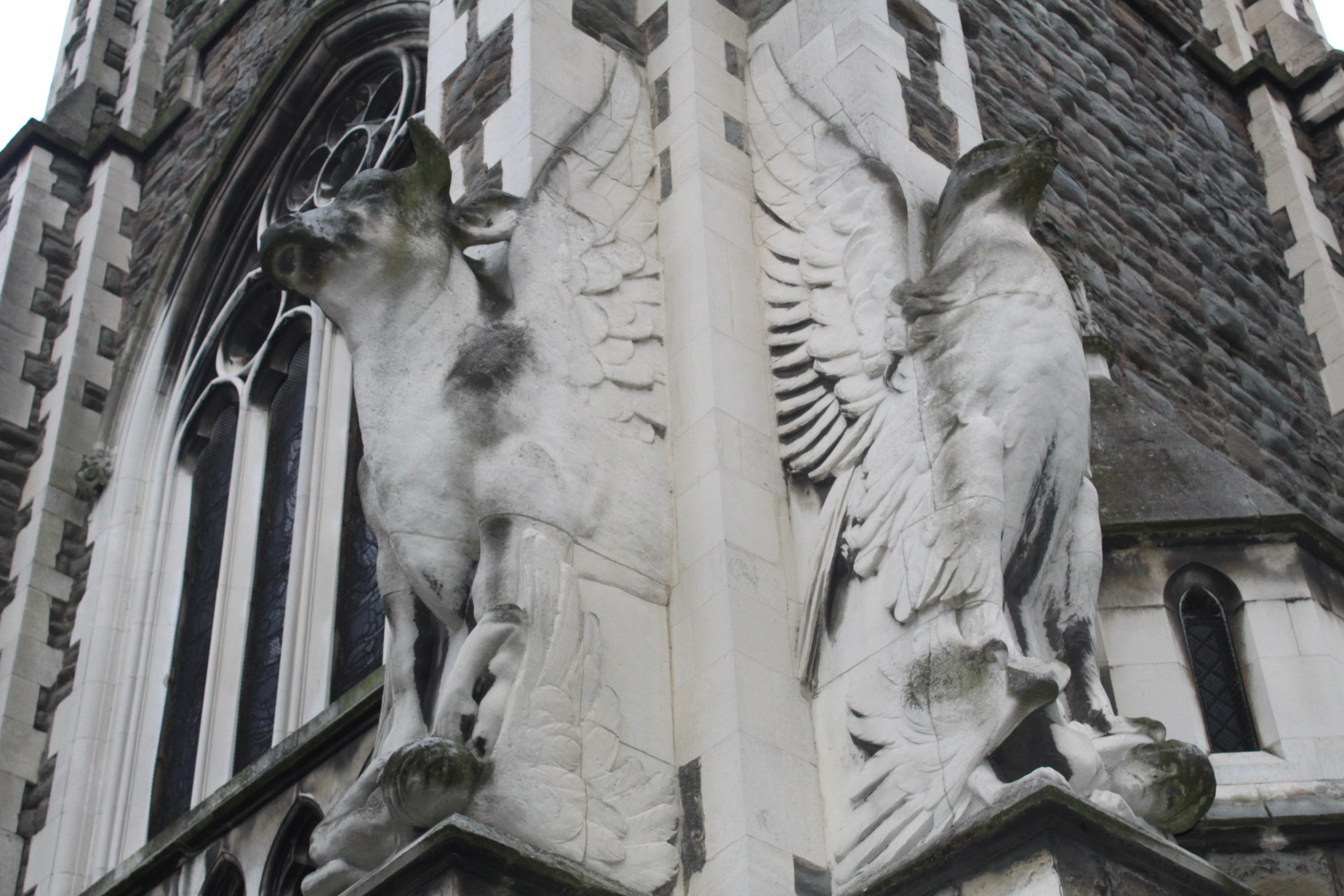
Winged Bull and Eagle at the doorway of the church in Upper Clapton

Between 1892 and 1895 the Agapemonites built the Church of the Ark of the Covenant, Upper Clapton, London. It was designed by Joseph Morris (and his sons and daughters, some of whom lived with the sect) in a Gothic style. Although it is fairly conventional in floor plan, the outside of the church is a riot of statuary and symbolism. The main doorways sport large carvings of angels and the four evangelists symbolised by a man, an eagle, a bull and a lion. The same four figures, cast in bronze, look out over the four quarters of the Earth from the base of the steeple. The two flanking weather vanes show a certain symbolic debt to William Blake's Jerusalem depicting, as they do, a fiery chariot and a sheaf of arrows (presumably of desire), while the main steeple is clearly surmounted by a spear. The stained glass windows, designed by noted children's book illustrator Walter Crane, and made by J. S. Sparrow, betray the unconventional nature of the sect as they illustrate the 'true station of womankind'. The church was abandoned after 1956, used by a splinter group, and now is used by the Georgian Orthodox Church who have renamed it as the Cathedral of the Nativity of our Lord.

== John Hugh Smyth-Pigott ==
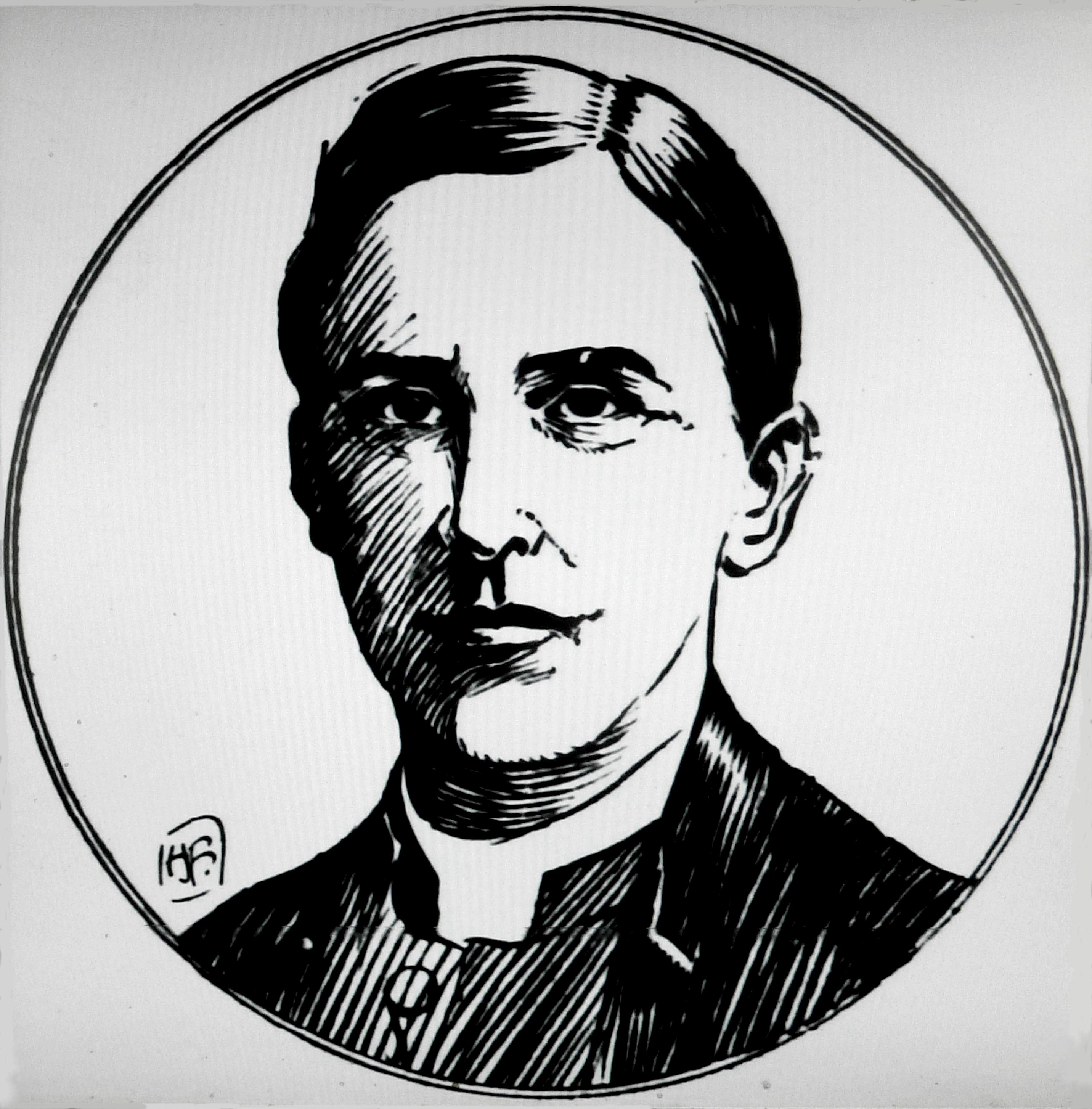
John Hugh Smyth-Pigott, in 1905

=== Background ===
Smyth-Pigott was born in Somerset on 1 August 1852. He had wealthy parents, and was an Oxford graduate, but he began his career as a sailor. After ordination as an Anglican clergyman in 1882, he became a curate and Salvation Army officer. He died of influenza, and his funeral took place in the Agapemone grounds on 24 March 1927.

=== Smyth-Pigott at Agapemone ===
After Prince died in 1899 he was replaced by the Reverend John Hugh Smyth-Pigott. Around 1890, Smyth-Pigott again started leading meetings of the community and recruited 50 young female followers to supplement the ageing population of Agapemonites. He took Ruth Anne Preece as his second wife and she had three children, named Glory, Power and Life. By 1902 his fame had spread as far as India, from where Mirza Ghulam Ahmad warned him of his false teachings and made a death prophecy against him in a letter written in November 1902, stating that should Smyth-Pigott refuse to repent from his claims to divinity, then he would die within the lifetime of Mirza Ghulam Ahmad. Also adding that should Smyth-Pigott not die within his lifetime, then this would falsify Mirza Ghulam's claim to messiahship. Along with the cited letter, Mirza Ghulam also separately announced the prophecy he received about Smyth-Pigott in 1902. This was recorded in the 'Tadhkirah'-a collection of his dreams, visions and revelations. Despite this prophecy, Smyth-Pigott continued to claim to be God, both during the life of Mirza Ghulam Ahmad, and after his death. Cited are two August 1905 newspaper clippings from the Auckland Star and The Cambrian detailing separate eyewitness reports of both Smyth-Pigott claiming to be God and his followers still openly preaching his divinity. Similarly, following Mirza Ghulam's death in 1908, Smyth-Pigott once again claimed to be God in 1909 during his inhibition by the Bishop of Bath and Wells, as recorded in the Nottingham Evening Post of March 1927.

The house which may have belonged to Smyth-Pigott in St John's Wood was visited by John Betjeman in his film Metro-land. It is built in the neo-gothic style. It is currently the home of the television presenter Vanessa Feltz and was previously the home of Charles Saatchi.

Following Smyth-Pigott's death in 1927, the sect gradually declined until the last member, Ruth, died in 1956. Her funeral in 1956 was the only time when outsiders were admitted to the chapel.

Smyth-Pigott's granddaughter, Margaret Campbell, recalled that her grandmother (Ruth Preece) had warned her that there were many stories made up about Smyth-Pigott but that he was a 'good man'. Campbell argued that Smyth-Pigott, or Beloved as he was known, did not have affairs, although he did have two bigamous wives. She claimed that both wives were happy with the arrangement (one being older and unable to have children) and that the sect had to be viewed as of its time, emerging shortly after religious emancipation in the 1830s. It allowed many rich women an alternative lifestyle to their other options of governess or wife and they lived in luxury at the Agapemone in Somerset until their death. She recalled growing up at the cult as a very happy experience in an interview to the Henley Standard in 2016, shortly before her death. Campbell argued that Beloved had once given a sermon in which he said, 'Christ is no longer here (pointing skywards) but here (pointing to his chest),' thereby expounding the central Christian doctrine of Christ within every Christian and that this had been twisted by the media for their own aims. Kate Barlow deftly dispels rumours of a 'revolving stage of virgins' as described by one newspaper at the time as myth in her memoir 'The Abode of Love' and details many interesting aspects of the cult such as its own signature tea served at 4pm every day.

== Books about the sect ==
The Abode of Love by Aubrey Menen is a novelisation of the history of the Agapemonites under Prince's leadership.

A second book called The Abode of Love was written by Smyth-Pigott's granddaughter, Kate Barlow. It is an account of life as a child with her family in the sect. The book includes family photographs and details of conversations she had as a child with the then-elderly sect members.

Charles Mander wrote a book focusing on the earlier history under Prince's leadership. The Reverend Prince and his Abode of Love was published in 1976 by EP Publishing Ltd.

Stuart Flinders has recently written an account of the group's history, published in 2024, titled A Very British Cult: Rogue Priests and the Abode of Love.

== Bibliography ==
- Armytage, W.H.G. (2013). Heavens Below: Utopian Experiments in England, 1560–1960. Routledge. ISBN 9781134529438.
- Barlow, Kate (2011). The Abode of Love. Mainstream Publishing. ISBN 978-1845962135.
- Basit, Asif M. (2012). "Rev. John Hugh Smyth Pigott, His Claim, Prophecy and End". The Review of Religions.
- Dixon, William Hepworth (1868). Spiritual Wives. Hurst & Blackett. "Prince."
- Dunning, R W; Elrington, C R; Baggs, A P; Siraut, M C (1992). "Spaxton". A History of the County of Somerset: Volume 6: Andersfield, Cannington, and North Petherton Hundreds (Bridgwater and neighbouring parishes). Institute of Historical Research.
- Evans, Roger (2004). Somerset Tales of Mystery and Murder. Countryside Books. ISBN 978-1853068638.
- Evans, Roger (2006). Blame it on the vicar. Halsgrove. ISBN 9781841145686.
- Flinders, Stuart (2024). A Very British Cult: Rogue Priests and the Abode of Love. Icon. Hardback: ISBN 978-183773-147-3. ebook: 978-183773-148-0.
- Gray, Alasdair (2009). Old Men in Love: John Tunnock's Posthumous Papers. Bloomsbury. ISBN 9780747593836.
- Grumley-Grennan, Tony (2010). Tales of English Eccentrics. Lulu.com. ISBN 9780953892242.
- McCormick, Donald (1962). Temple of Love. Jarrolds.
- Menen, Aubrey (1990). The Abode of Love. Penguin Books. ISBN 978-0140123463.
- Mander, Charles (1976). Reverend Prince and His Abode of Love. E.P. ISBN 978-0715811986.
- Mitchell, Sally (2004). Frances Power Cobbe: Victorian Feminist, Journalist, Reformer. University of Virginia Press. ISBN 978-0813922713.
- Parry, Edward Abbott (2010). The drama of the law. Gale. ISBN 978-1240076499.
- Price, D. T. W. (1977). A History of Saint David's University College, Lampeter. University of Wales Press. ISBN 978-0708306062.
- Wise, Sarah (2012). Inconvenient People. The Bodley Head. ISBN 978-1847921123.
- Qayoom, Rehan (2012). ""God breathed & they were scattered" - New Light on Hazrat Mirza Ghulam Ahmad & the Agapemonites".
- Sands, Kalika (16 December 2012). "The Possibility of Sanity". Oxonian Review. 20 (6). Archived from the original on 4 January 2013.
- Scull, Andrew (1992). Social Order/Mental Disorder: Anglo-American Psychiatry in Historical Perspective. University of California Press. ISBN 978-0520078895.
- Stunt, Timothy C.F. (2006). "The Early Development of Arthur Augustus Rees and his relations with the Brethren". Brethren Archivists and Historians Network Review. 4: 22–35.
- Schwieso, Joshua John (1996). "Religious Fanaticism' and Wrongful Confinement in Victorian England: The Affair of Louisa Nottidge". Social History of Medicine. 9 (2): 159–174. doi:10.1093/shm/9.2.159. PMID 11613445.
- Stillwell, Arthur (1849). "Dr Stillwell's History of the Case of Miss Nottidge". Lancet. 2 (1351): 80–81. doi:10.1016/S0140-6736(02)71375-5.
- Waite, Vincent (1964). Portrait of the Quantocks. Robert Hale. ISBN 978-0709111580.
- Wilson, Owain W. (1970). "Prince and the Lampeter Brethren". Trivium. V: 10–20.
