= UK Environmental Law Association =

Charity in England

The United Kingdom Environmental Law Association (UKELA) is a charity registered in England, founded in 1988 and dedicated to improving environmental law in the United Kingdom; its implementation; understanding and awareness of the subject, and networking among lawyers and non-lawyers with an interest in the area.

UKELA, which uses the slogan, "Making the law work for a better environment", organises conferences, lectures and seminars, and work with the UK Parliament on changes to their area of the law. They also publish e-law, a bi-monthly electronic journal for members, as well as various reports and consultation documents.

The organisation, which is run by a council of around 20 individuals including five members of the executive committee, also includes regional groups and working parties on specific aspects of environmental law, and a total of about 800 members.

== See also ==
Environmental Law Foundation
