= Clapton Cinematograph Theatre =

Cinema and listed building in Hackney, London

Coordinates: 51°33′27″N 0°03′23″W

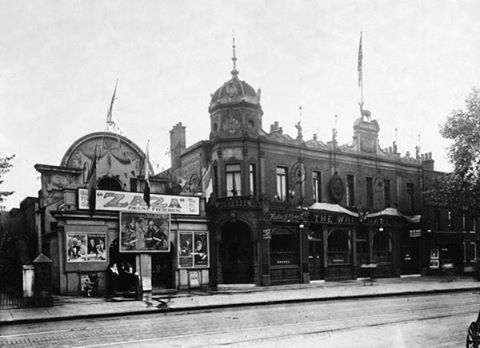
- Clapton Cinematograph Theatre in the 1910s
- Former names: Clapton Cinematograph Theatre (1910) Kenning Hall Cinema (1919)

General information
- Location: 229 Lower Clapton Road, United Kingdom
- Opened: 1910
- Closed: 1979

Design and construction
- Architect: George D. Duckworth

Other information
- Seating capacity: 750

Website
- https://claptoncinema.org.uk/

The Clapton Cinematograph Theatre is a former cinema and locally listed building at 229 Lower Clapton Road in the London borough of Hackney. Opened in 1910, it was designed by cinema architect George D. Duckworth at a cost of £4,500. It was one of the earliest purpose-built cinemas in London, established in response to the Cinematograph Act 1909, which introduced new safety regulations following a number of fires caused by highly flammable cellulose nitrate film. The building has had several subsequent uses, including as a night club, but has stood vacant since a change of ownership in 2011.

== History ==
=== Early years (1910–1919) ===
The cinema was built on the site of bait and livery stables serving the adjacent White Hart Hotel and was opened on 16 December 1910, with a ceremony attended by the Mayor and Mayoress of Hackney and chaired by Herbert Chinn, the theatre's chairman and proprietor of the White Hart. The decoration on the front of the cinema reflected the existing decorative mouldings on the entrance to the public house.

Early promotional material for the cinema showed its interior which was illuminated by ornamental electric torches and had a barrel-vaulted ceiling with gilded plasterwork. Decorative mouldings adorned the auditorium which had a proscenium arch enclosing the screen which measured 18ft by 15 ft and plush tip-up seats to accommodate an audience of 750. Contemporary advertising in the Hackney and Kingsland Gazette promoted it as “the most luxurious Cinematograph Theatre in the District". In its early days, it presented short one-reel silent films alongside live music performances.

Cinemas like the Clapton Cinematograph Theatre played a significant role in widening the horizons of ordinary people. In April 1912, cinema audiences were shown British Pathe newsreels of the aftermath of the Titanic disaster. The Hackney and Kingsland Gazette reported that the Mayor and Mayoress of Hackney held a fundraising event at the Clapton Cinematograph Theatre for the widows and orphans of those lost at sea, including local crew member James Wood of Upper Clapton.

=== Kenning Hall and Odeon era (1919–1979) ===
In 1919, the cinema was renamed to the Kenning Hall Cinema, and its seating capacity was reduced to 700. It was converted for talking pictures in 1929 and in the late 1930s it was taken over by the Odeon circuit, which commissioned its architect George Coles to modernise the frontage in a Modernist style, though the original domed section was retained. Seating capacity was further reduced to 641. Odeon's long-term plan to demolish the building and construct a new cinema on the site was halted by the onset of the Second World War.

The Kenning Hall subsequently operated as one of Odeon circuit’s lesser venues, especially after the 1939 opening of the larger, Art Deco Ritz Cinema nearby by Associated British Cinemas (the Ritz was demolished in 1973). The Kenning Hall was leased out to independent operator Mistlin Theatres chain from March 1958. Facing declining audiences and the emergence of home video, it closed in June 1979, after nearly seventy years of operation.

=== Nightclub era and closure (1983–2006) ===
The building was unused until 1983, when it was acquired by music promoter Irvine Douglas and converted into “Dougies’’, a nightclub. Alterations included a false ceiling, a mezzanine floor, and a bar. The club, which showcased established musicians such as Aswad and Hugh Masekela, advertised itself as a dine and dance venue which admitted “over 21s only” and where patrons should “dress smartly”.

In 2000, new owner Ken Edwards took over the venue and changed its name to the Palace Pavilion. It began attracting a younger audience with a focus on rap music. The Palace Pavilion became the focus for gang activity and a series of street shootings which earned the area the title "Murder Mile". Following a campaign by the local community, the nightclub had its licence revoked and was shut down in 2006.

== Campaign for restoration and current status ==
After the closure, the Friends of Clapton Cinematograph Theatre was established with the aim of restoring the historic cinema and bringing it back into use as a community arts centre focussing on film and live performance.

During the group's efforts to secure funding, a High Court case involving owner Ken Edwards resulted in the building being repossessed by the mortgaging bank. It was sold to St Mary of Tserha Sion in 2011. While the new owners gave assurances to local councillors about restoring the building and retaining original features, a subsequent planning application for conversion was opposed by conservation and resident groups concerned that the proposals did not safeguard the historic fabric of the former Edwardian picture palace. Despite these objections, planning permission was granted. Following the 2011 purchase, the building was adapted for use as a place of worship. The St Mary of Tserha Sion Ethiopian Orthodox Tewahedo Church opened at the site in November 2025.
