= Herbert Arthur Buchanan-Wollaston =

British Royal Navy officer

Vice-Admiral Herbert Arthur Buchanan-Wollaston, CMG (13 October 1878 – 24 March 1975) was a Royal Navy officer. As captain of HMS Calypso, he oversaw the rescue of the Greek royal family from Corfu in 1922.
