= Joseph Morris (architect) =

British architect

- Born: 1836
- Died: 1913 (aged 76–77)
- Occupation: Architect
- Practice: Joseph Morris & Son
- Buildings: Cordes Hall

Joseph Morris was a British architect.

== Family and career ==
Joseph was the father of Francis Edward Morris, A RIBA (1872–1908), who was articled to him in 1887 and was his professional partner 1895–1905. Joseph Morris was the Berkshire County Surveyor 1872–1905. Joseph, a Quaker, was the father of at least two daughters, Violet Morris, also an architect, and Olive Morris, wood carver and engineer. He lived for a time at the Agapemonites settlement in the Quantocks.

In 1908 Joseph was in partnership with his son Henry Silver Morris, LRIBA.

A biographical article was published by the Ancient Monuments Society, Morris of Reading: A Family of Architects 1836-1958.

== Works ==
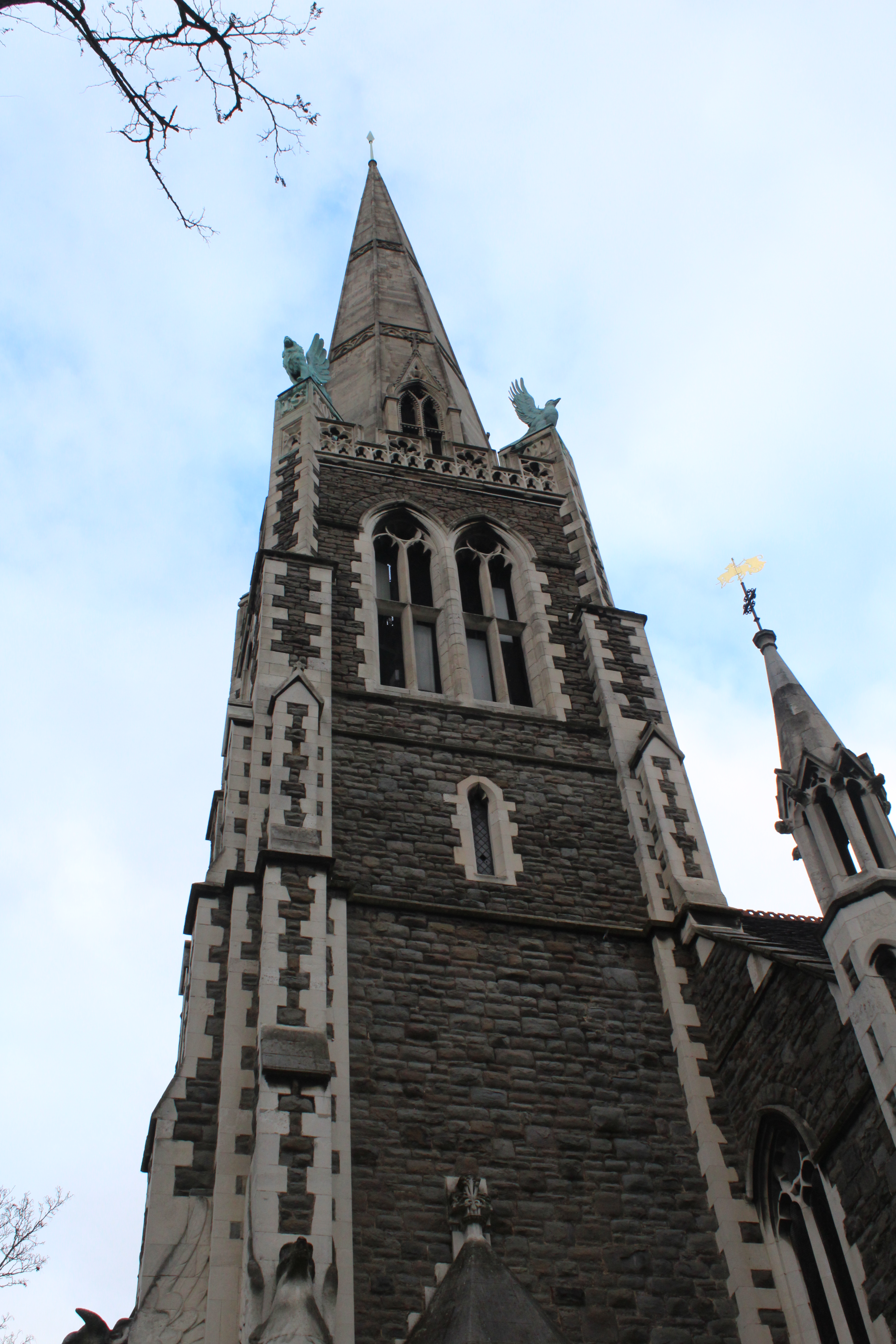
Tower of the Church of the Ark of the Covenant. Grade II* listed

- Royal Berkshire Hospital, Reading, Chapel, North Block
- St. Paul's parish church, Highmoor, Oxfordshire, 1859
- Church of the Ark of the Covenant, Stamford Hill originally the Agapemonite church, nowadays the Georgian Orthodox Cathedral of the nativity of the Lord. 1892/95
- Houses, 7–25 Station Road, Reading, Berkshire, 1901–03 (with F. E. Morris)*Cordes Hall, Sunninghill, Berkshire, 1902 (with F. E. Morris)
- Police Station, Rectory Road, Wokingham, Berkshire, 1904
- Police Station, Broadway, Maidenhead, Berkshire, 1906

== Sources ==
- Brodie, Antonia; Felstead, Alison; Franklin, Jonathan; Pinfield, Leslie; Oldfield, Jane, eds. (2001). Directory of British Architects 1834-1914, L–Z. London & New York: Continuum. pp. 214–215. ISBN 0-8264-5514-X.
- Pevsner, Nikolaus (1966). Berkshire. The Buildings of England. Harmondsworth: Penguin Books.
- Sherwood, Jennifer; Pevsner, Nikolaus (1974). Oxfordshire. The Buildings of England. Harmondsworth: Penguin Books. p. 649. ISBN 0-14-071045-0.
