= London Buses route 394 =

London bus route

394
- East London Alexander Dennis Enviro200 MMC on City Road in October 2026

Overview
- Operator: East London (Stagecoach London)
- Garage: Ash Grove
- Vehicle: Alexander Dennis Enviro200 MMC

Route
- Start: Islington
- Via: Hoxton; Haggerston; Cambridge Heath; London Fields; Hackney
- End: Homerton University Hospital

London Buses route 394 is a Transport for London contracted bus route in London, England. Running between Islington and Homerton University Hospital, it is operated by Stagecoach London subsidiary East London.

== History ==
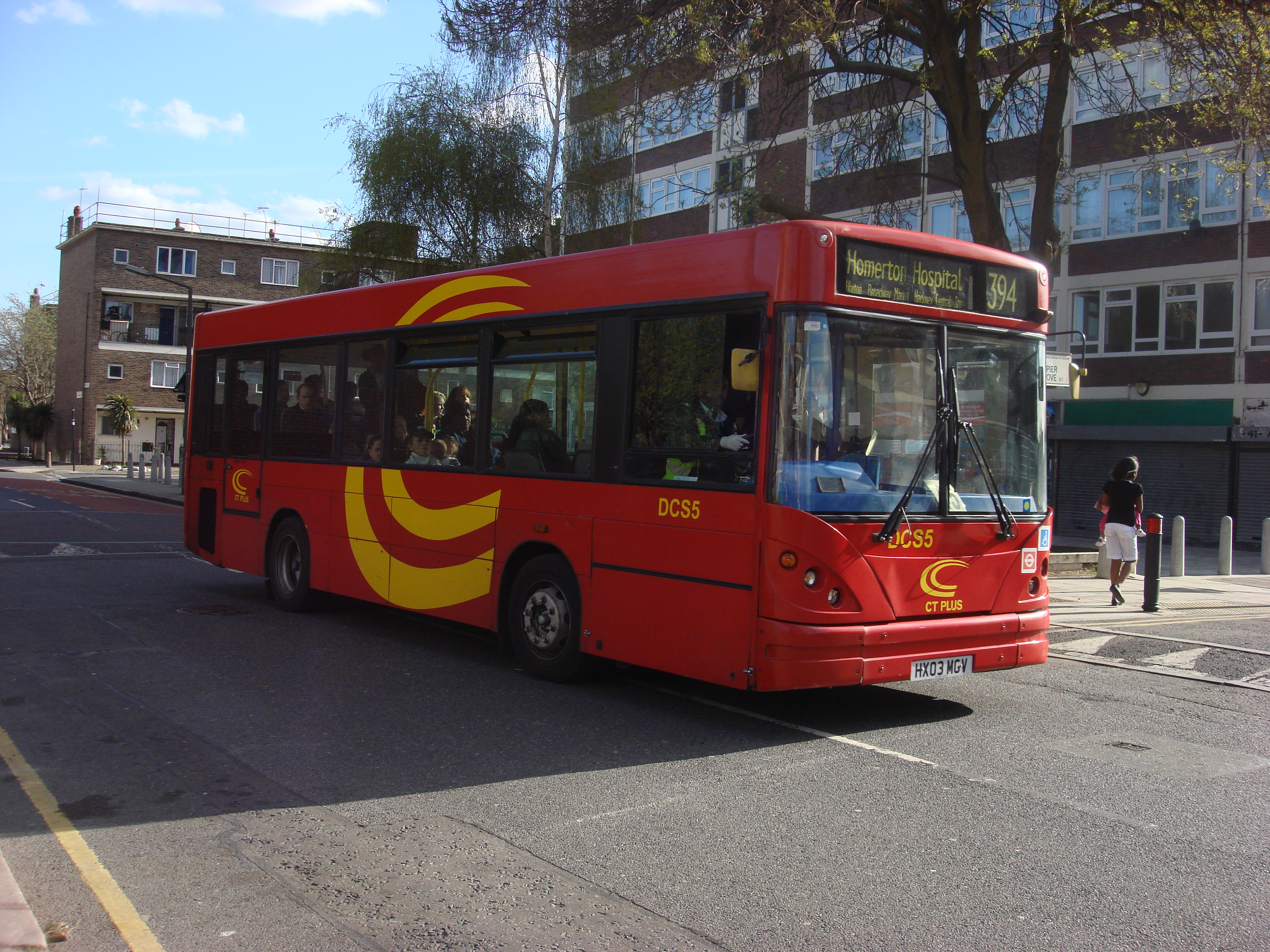
CT Plus Caetano Slimbus bodied TransBus Dart SLF in April 2009

Route 394 originally commenced operating on 15 September 2001 as the Shoreditch Hoppa under a London Service Permit. It was developed to address the lack of public transport running east to west across Shoreditch and funded as part of the New Deal for Communities (NDC). The NDC appointed Hackney Community Transport to run the service following a competitive tendering process.

The service initially ran at a half-hourly frequency between Tolpuddle Street in Islington and Broadway Market. It was operated with two Renault minibuses in a unique blue livery and served several roads with no other bus routes. Passenger numbers rose rapidly to 2,200 per week and Transport for London agreed to integrate the Shoreditch Hoppa into the mainstream London Buses network, with a route number and inclusion on network maps.

Transport for London awarded HCT Group subsidiary CT Plus a contract to operate route 394 from 3 May 2003. Upon being re-tendered, CT Plus retained the route with a new contract commencing on 1 May 2010. At the same time, the route was extended to Homerton University Hospital and the vehicles on the route changed to low-floor Dennis Dart SLFs. The frequency of the route was increased; from initially using just two vehicles, it now requires 10 buses.

In October 2009, a baby was born on a bus operating route 394. The baby was given the middle name Dennis after the manufacturer of the bus.

On 29 April 2017, route 394 was retained by HCT Group with a new fleet of Alexander Dennis Enviro200 MMC buses introduced.

On 27 August 2022, route 394 was included in the sale of HCT Group's ‘red bus’ operations to East London.

Following a consultation in late 2023 and early 2024 a proposal to extend the route to King's Cross Central with new stops on Handyside Street and Canal Reach was approved. However, since this consultation no bus stops have been built and the route has not yet been extended.

== Current route ==
Route 394 operates via these primary locations:

- Islington Tolpuddle Street
- Angel station
- Hoxton station
- Haggerston Thurtle Road
- Broadway Market
- London Fields
- Hackney Town Hall
- Homerton University Hospital

Route 394 links the busy boroughs of Hackney and Islington, and visits the culturally significant areas of London Fields and Hoxton. Its route was featured in Time Out London magazine in March 2009.
