= Plus Bus route 812 =

Bus route in Greater London, England

812
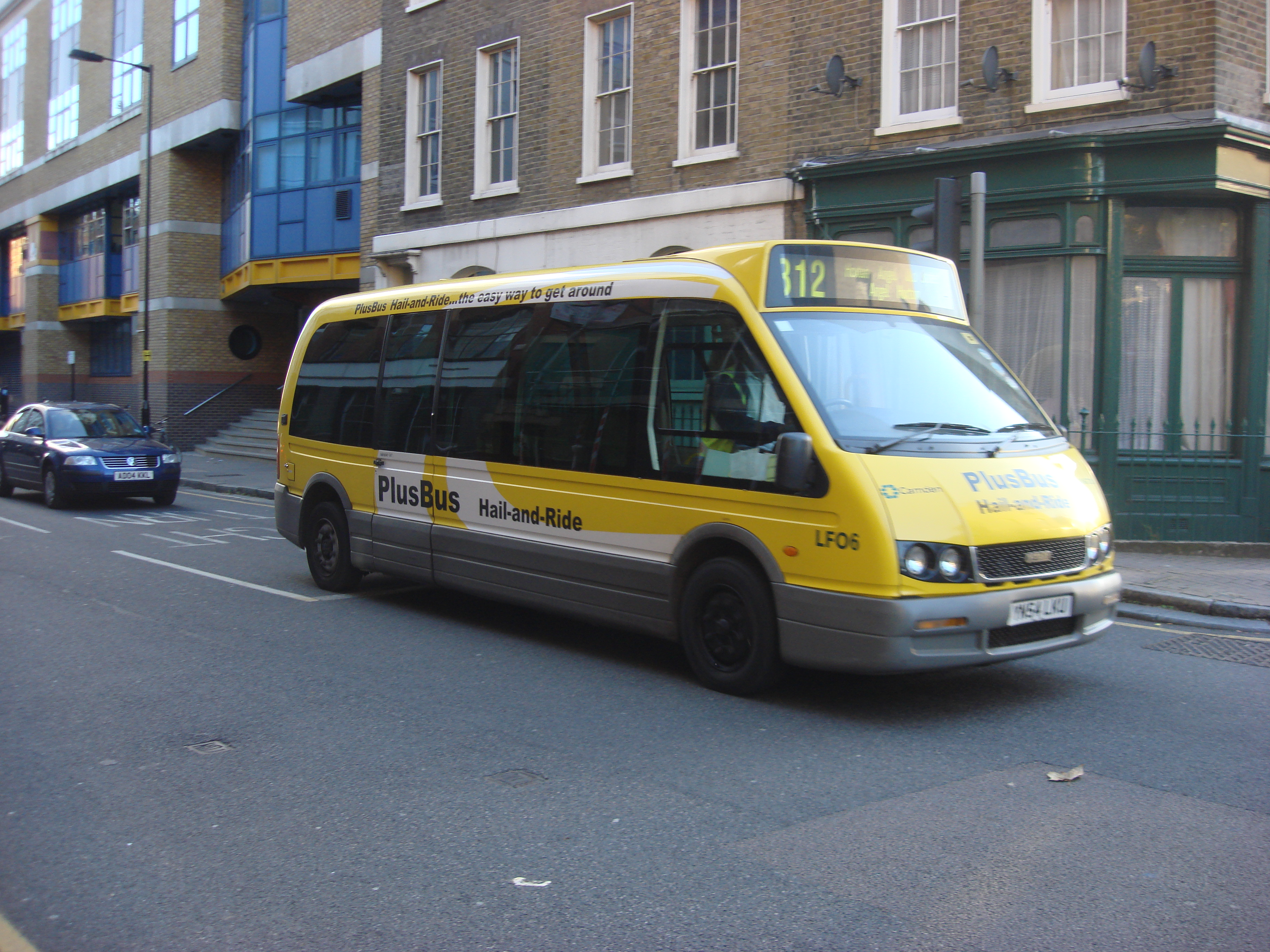
- Optare Alero in 2008

Overview
- Operator: HCT Group
- Garage: Ash Grove
- Vehicle: Optare Solo
- Peak vehicle requirement: 3
- Status: Defunct
- Began service: 2007
- Ended service: 26 August 2022

Route
- Start: Hoxton
- Via: Islington; Clerkenwell; Finsbury; Old Street
- End: Hoxton
- Length: 4 miles (6km)

Service
- Level: Monday to Friday
- Frequency: Every 30 minutes
- Journey time: 27-28 minutes
- Operates: 09:30 until 16:55

Plus Bus route 812 was a circuit bus route in Greater London, serving Finsbury and Islington. Unusually for a bus route entirely within London, it was tendered and subsidised by Islington London Borough Council rather than Transport for London, and operated under a London Service permit. For this reason, buses used on this route were in a yellow and white livery, rather than the usual full red, and it did not charge standard London fares. Oyster Cards were not accepted anywhere on the route, but Freedom Passes and walk-up cash fares were accepted. It was operated by HCT Group.

Despite the name, the route was not part of the Plusbus scheme.

== History ==
Route 812 was introduced by CT Plus in 2007. Together with similar route 816, it replaced a group of routes which previously ran under the Plus Bus name. Funding for the route was withdrawn at the end of 2007, leading to fears of cancellation, but local councillors stepped in to fund the route. In 2010, the route carried 27,000 passengers per year.

The route was increased in frequency from two buses per hour to three in 2009. New 12-seat Volkswagen Transporter minibuses with Bluebird Tucana bodies were introduced to the route in 2010.

The route was faced with withdrawal in 2011 due to Islington London Borough Council budget cuts. To support the route, Transport for London provided additional funding.

In March 2020, HCT Group temporarily withdrew the route as a result of low usage amid the COVID-19 national lockdown.

On 26 August 2022, HCT Group ceased operating the route citing financial difficulties.

== Route ==
Route 812 operated via these primary locations:

- Hoxton
- Prebend Street
- Islington
- Clerkenwell
- Exmouth Market
- Finsbury
- Featherstone Street for Old Street (one way only)
- St Luke's (one way only)
- Finsbury
- Exmouth Market
- Clerkenwell
- Islington
- Prebend Street
- Hoxton
