= Casa Fofo =

Restaurant in London, United Kingdom

Casa Fofō
- Interactive map of Casa Fofō

Restaurant information
- Established: 2019
- Owner: Adolfo De Cecco
- Head chef: Adolfo De Cecco
- Rating: 1 Michelin star
- Location: 158 Sandringham Road, Dalston, London, United Kingdom
- Coordinates: 51°33′0″N 0°3′51″W
- Website: casafofolondon.co.uk

Casa Fofo is a Michelin-starred restaurant in London, United Kingdom.

== See also ==
- List of Michelin-starred restaurants in Greater London
