= I. Jordan =

British music producer and DJ

- Origin: Doncaster, England
- Genres: House; techno; hardcore
- Occupations: DJ; music producer; club promoter
- Label: Ninja Tune

I. Jordan is a British electronic music producer and DJ.

== Life ==
Jordan grew up in Doncaster, England. Jordan studied philosophy at the University of Hull, where involvement began in the Crystal Clear DJ society, booking club nights and eventually becoming president. Following university, Jordan moved to London in 2014.

Jordan is genderfluid and genderqueer, and uses they/them pronouns. On 30 May 2022, I. Jordan changed their name from India Jordan, explaining the previous name "really doesn't resonate with me anymore".

== Career ==
Jordan began in producing music following their move to London. At this time they also co-managed New Atlantis, a regular "ambient social" party run in collaboration with electronic music producer and DJ Al Wootton (formally Deadboy). New Atlantis ended in 2018.

Jordan released For You was released on 20 May 2020 on Local Action. Ben Jolley, in a five-star review for NME, describes the EP as a "love letter" from Jordan to themselves. Resident Advisor describes For You as "ecstatic house"; DJ Mag calls it "euphoric house". Pitchfork noted that the album combines numerous genres and compared it to the work of Alan Braxe, Fred Falke, Dave Lee, and Bob Sinclar. Pitchfork also named For You's eponymous track a best new track. The album's final track, "Dear Nan King", is an homage to the television programme Tipping the Velvet. The album's cover art was shot at Dalston Superstore, a club Vice describes as "an east London LGBTQ institution". For You ranked highly in numerous Best of 2020 lists: Resident Advisor picked it as their Number 1 Track of 2020; Crack Magazine picked it as their Number 2 Track of 2020; Pitchfork picked it as their #21 Best Song of 2020, and it also featured in Best Song of the Year lists from Mixmag, Gorilla vs. Bear, NME, The Fader and more.

Watch Out!, released on 7 May 2021 on Ninja Tune, was composed over a six-month period. Resident Advisor, comparing Watch Out! to hardcore and techno, describes it as "alive" and "kinetic". Jordan wrote portions of the album on a train journey and bike rides around London. and took inspiration from travel more generally during the production process.

Mixmag named Jordan as one of their top 25 DJs who defined the year 2023 both through their musical contributions and their community work supporting transgender and non-binary artists.

In 2024, Jordan released their debut album I Am Jordan. The album was conceptually based on Jordan's self-realisation and personal journey. For one of the tracks on the album, "People Want Nice Things", Jordan recorded themselves stating the name of the song several times over the period of their voice dropping while taking testosterone.

== Discography ==
Jordan has released one full-length album I Am Jordan, four solo singles and EPs to date: DNT STP MY LV (2019), WARPER / Bulbasaur Shuffle (2019), For You (2020) and Watch Out! (2021) and has also released collaborative singles with fellow electronic artists Finn, Dance System and Fred Again.
