= HCT Group =

Former group of community transport operators in Britain

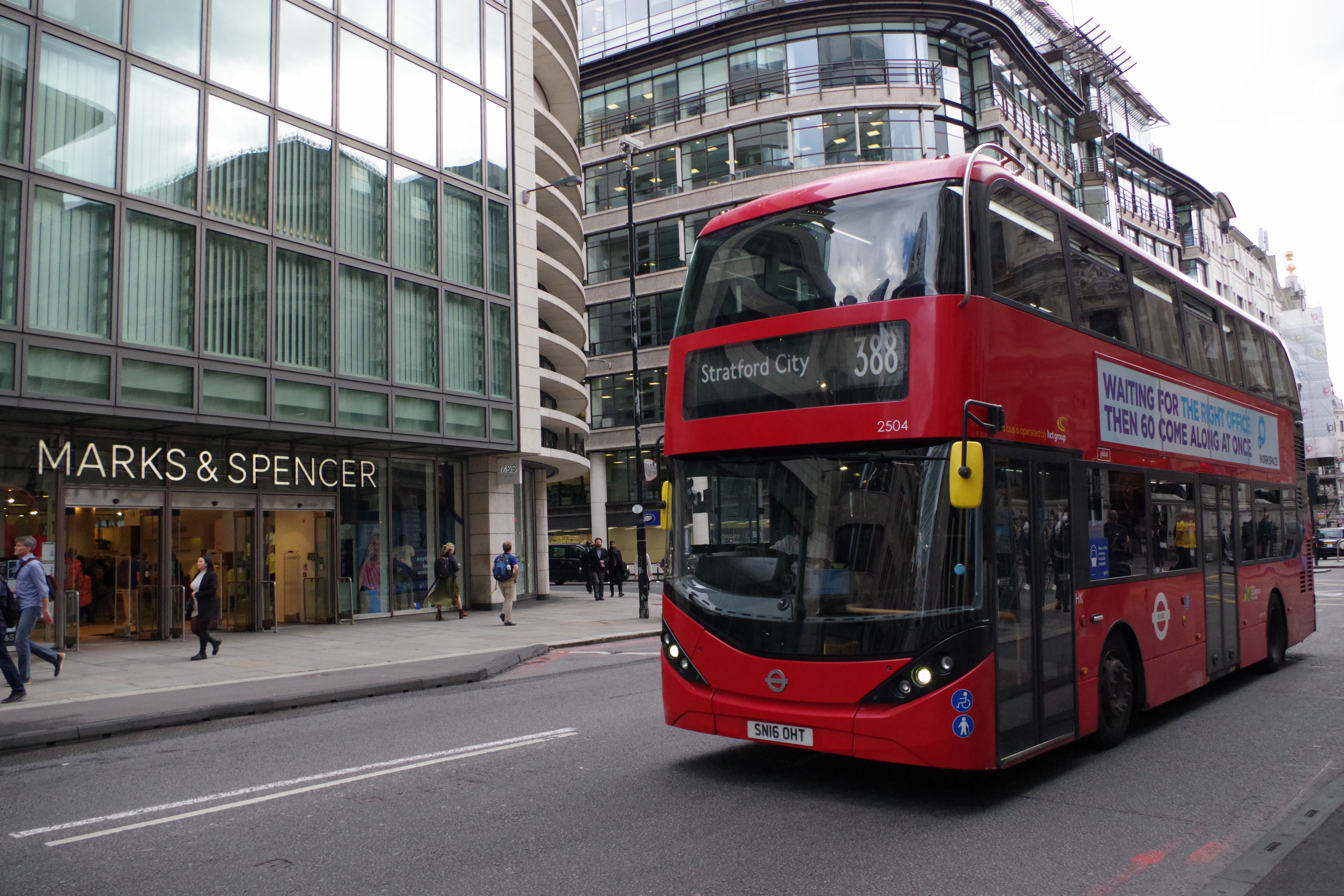
- Alexander Dennis Enviro400 in the City of London in 2022 on route 388
- Founded: 1982
- Ceased operation: 2022
- Headquarters: Old Street, London
- Service area: England and Channel Islands
- Service type: Bus services
- Chief executive: Lynn McClelland
- Website: Official website

HCT Group was a social enterprise providing transport services and community services in several areas of the United Kingdom. It was founded in 1982 as Hackney Community Transport in the London Borough of Hackney, to provide transport services for local voluntary organisations, charities, and community groups. HCT Group was registered as a company limited by guarantee (and therefore had no shareholders). The company was also a registered charity.

By 2014, HCT Group had a fleet of 500 vehicles, turnover of £43.7 million, and employed over 700. The company expanded into several areas of England and the Channel Islands through a series of acquisitions in 2017 and 2018, but after financial difficulties following the COVID-19 pandemic, the HCT Group ceased trading and entered administration in September 2022 after disposing of all its commercial bus services.

== History ==
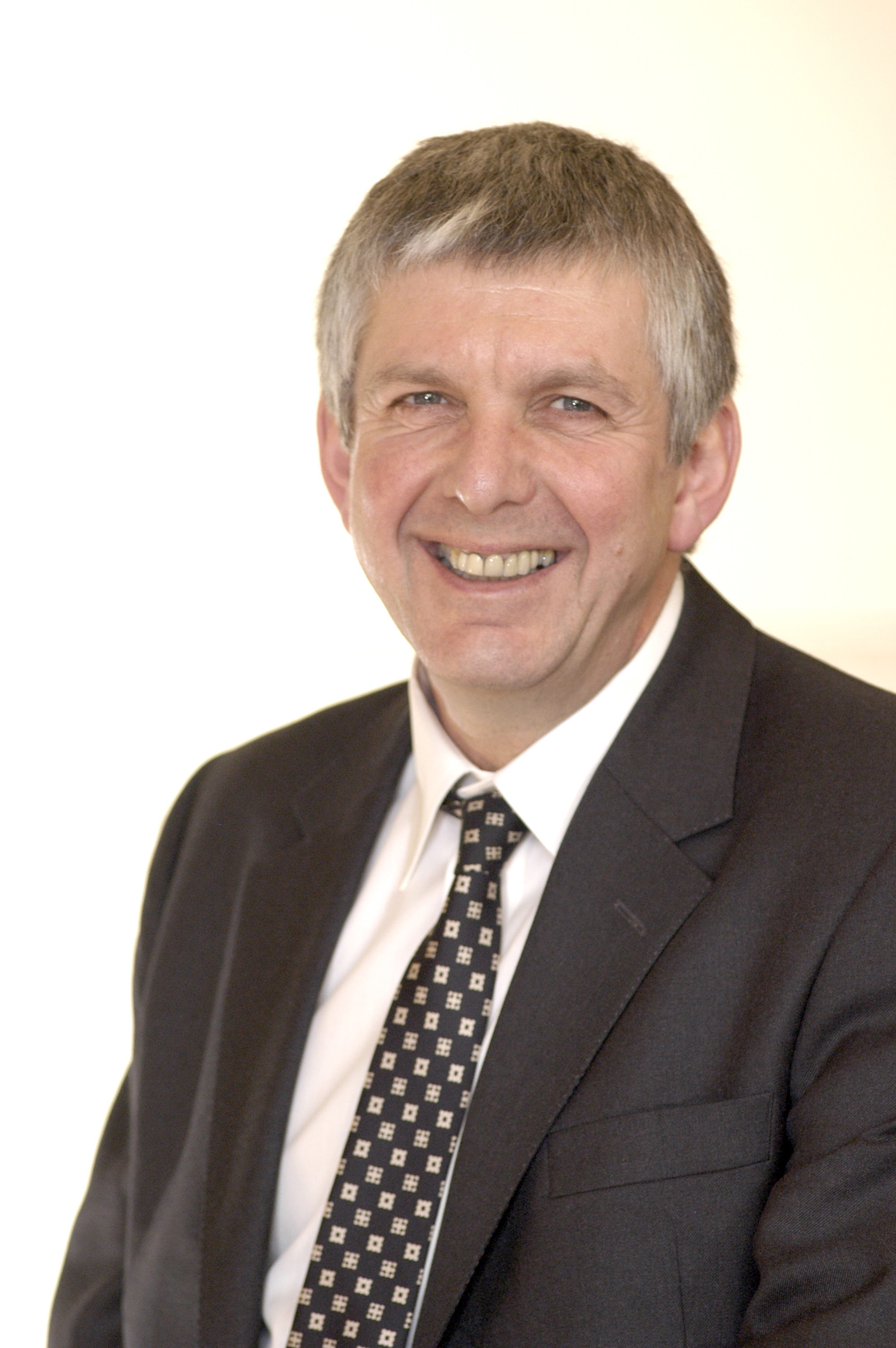
Dai Powell, CEO of HCT Group 1993–2020. Formerly a coal miner in Wales, he joined HCT as a bus cleaner in 1990

Hackney Community Transport was established in 1982 when 30 community groups in the London Borough of Hackney formed a pool of six vehicles with a grant from Hackney Borough Council to provide low-cost van and minibus hire for local community groups, and a door-to-door alternative to public transport for people with disabilities. The company's services were staffed by volunteers, but over the next decade a small group of paid staff built up to assist the volunteer workforce.

HCT Group received loans from London Rebuilding Society to finance its entry to the bus industry.

In 2004, HCT was contracted by EduAction to deliver 500 local special needs children to school and back each day for London Borough of Waltham Forest from a new depot in Leyton.

In March 2006, HCT expanded outside London to run eight yellow My bus school transport routes in and around Wakefield for West Yorkshire Metro. A further seven runs were added in September and three more in September 2007.

In July 2006, HCT merged with Lambeth & Southwark Community Transport. Later that year on 1 October 2006, HCT began to operate the AccessBus service in Leeds and in 2008, merged with Leeds Alternative Travel.

In March 2009, HCT Group published its first Impact Report. By 2010, HCT had grown by over a hundredfold since 1993 – from a turnover of £202k to a turnover of £23.3 million in 2009/10.

In February 2010, CT Plus Yorkshire took over the Hull 701 Priory Park & Ride route, with the aim of investing any surplus from its park-and-ride operation to expand a local community transport service and to set up training for long-term unemployed people in Hull. This was withdrawn in 2014, with Stagecoach taking over the service. In the same month, the company raised £5 million via a social loan.

In 2017 and 2018, the group completed a series of acquisitions, purchasing Social Access, Bristol; Manchester Community Transport; CT4TC, a Derbyshire community transport operator since renamed Derbyshire Community Transport; Powells, South Yorkshire; and Impact Group, West London.

Dai Powell, who had been chief executive since 1993, announced in April 2020 that he would retire from the post and be replaced by Lynn McClelland.

Following the COVID-19 pandemic, as well as a rise in costs for bus operators, HCT Group began to suffer from financial difficulties. On 29 September 2022, after disposing of its commercial bus operations in Yorkshire, Bristol, London and the Channel Islands, HCT Group ceased trading and formally entered administration.

== Social enterprise and transport ==
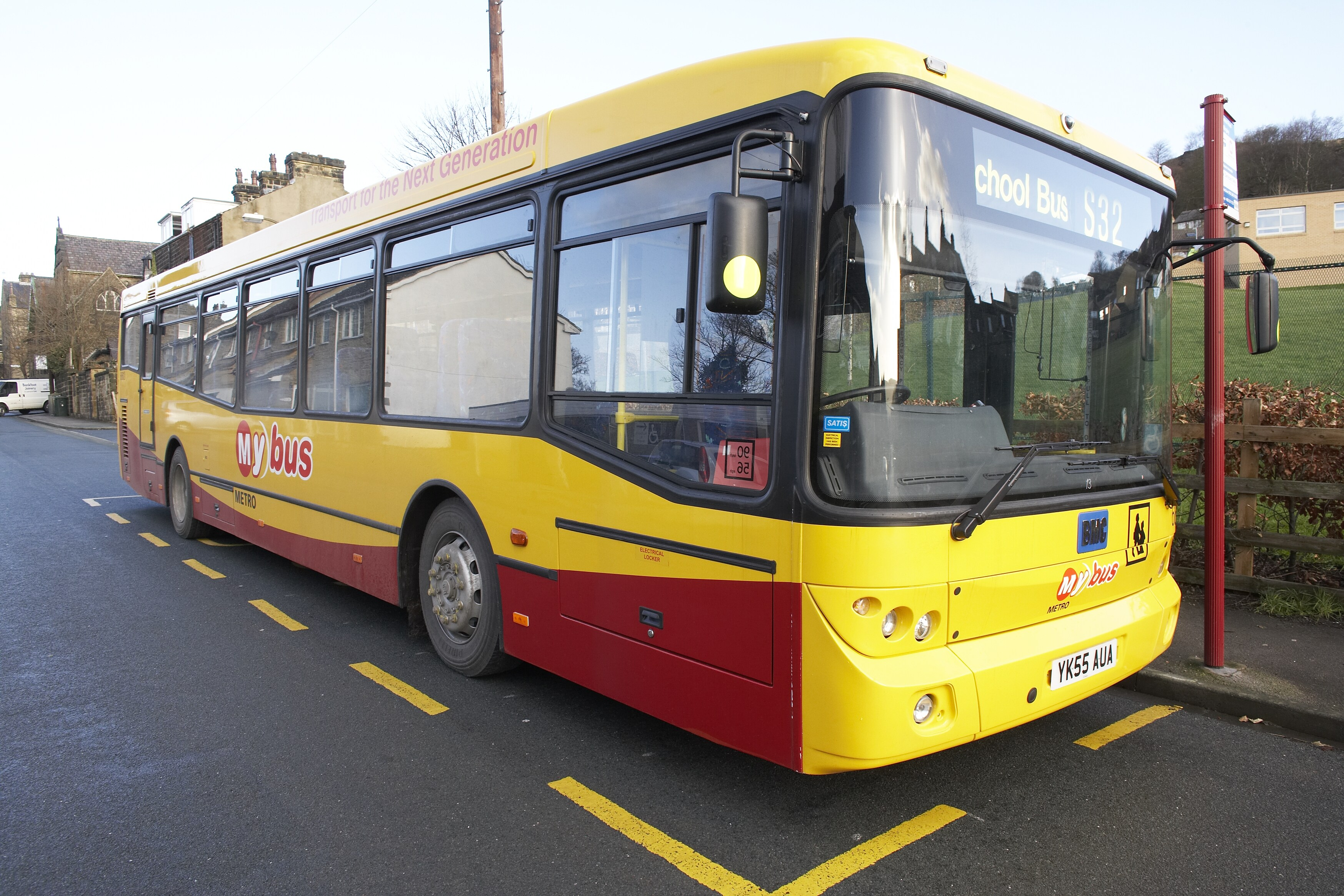
West Yorkshire Metro My bus school bus service operated by CT Plus in Bingley

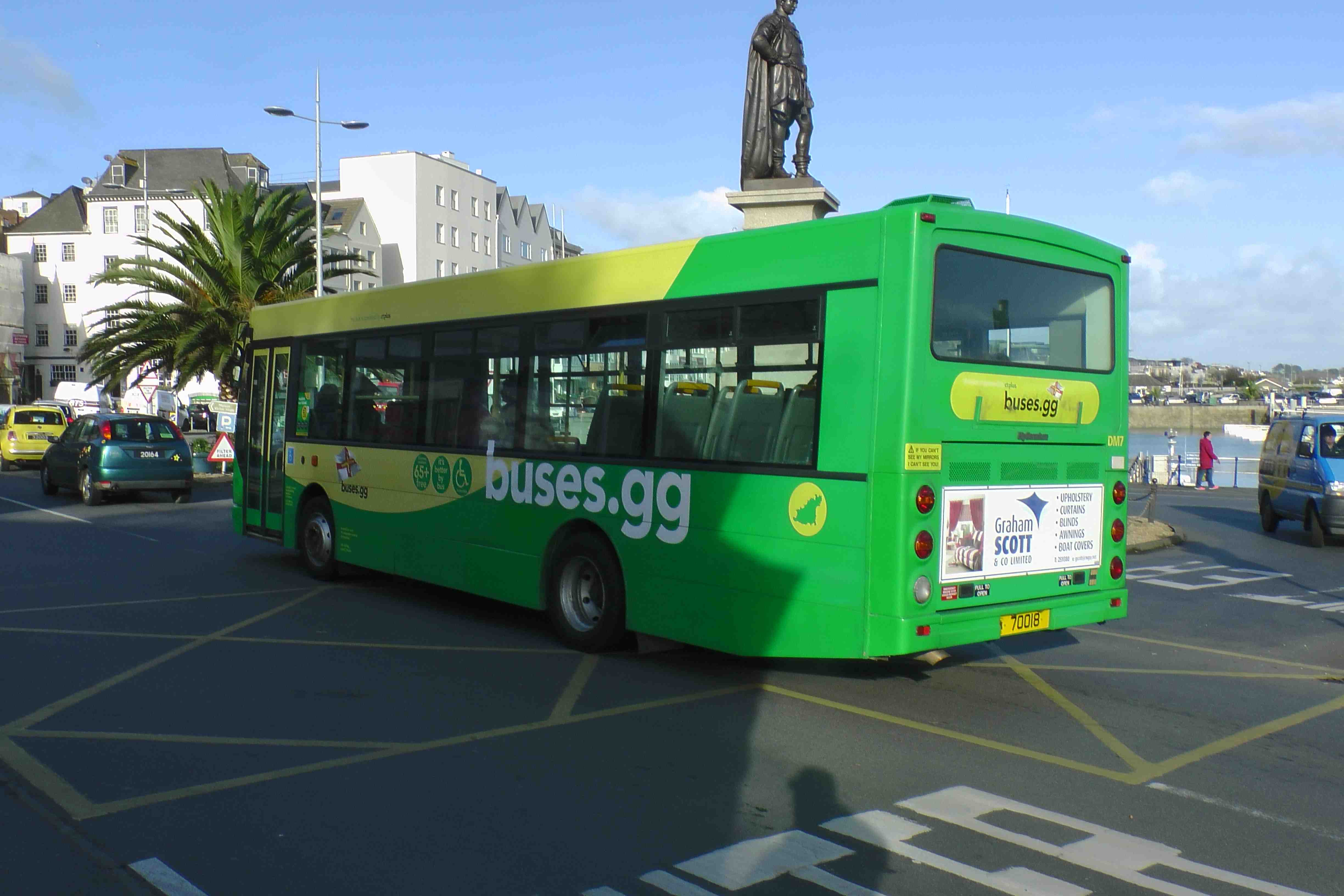
An ELC bodied bus on Guernsey in November 2015

The British government has promoted the delivery of public services by not-for-profit organisations (the third sector). British prime minister David Cameron has stated that he wants more social enterprises running public services as part of his "Big Society".

Charitable legal website Get Legal described HCT's corporate structure as allowing HCT Group to "separate the risks associated with its business in different limited liability vehicles." The social mission of each of those vehicles is protected (either through charitable status or through being CICs), which sends a clear message to the public that the organisation is a social enterprise.

HCT Group said it aims to "demonstrate and promote the social enterprise business model as a highly effective and socially responsible mechanism", and that it maintained environmental, health and safety, and social policies, and regularly measured its performance against these. Profit was seen by company CEO Dai Powell as enabling its social goals: "You have to be an enterprise first, because if you don't make a profit, you can't fulfil that social mission." HCT's commercial services allowed it to invest 18 per cent of its annual profits into non-commercial community transport in 2007/08. Its mission was to increase this to 30 per cent in the subsequent five years.

HCT Group only competed for contracts that have high levels of accessibility and quality in the specification. "HCT sees the provision of high-quality public services as a goal in itself...and actively seeks user input into the design and delivery of all its services." The CEO claims "we don't provide poor services for poor people – the quality has to be there.” HCT recruits volunteers to train people with learning difficulties and physical disabilities to use public transport independently.

West Yorkshire Metro noted that a community transport provider "...spends its surpluses on transport services in the community which are not commissioned from public bodies" but that "commissioning from the sector can however carry risks...organisations can lack capability and professionalism and be over reliant on individuals leading to instability."

HCT Group was no more immune to labour relations problems than any other bus operator. The Socialist Worker described HCT as "no friend of workers" and its workers as "some of the lowest paid drivers in London".

HCT Group preferred social enterprises and co-ops as business partners and suppliers; when they raised £500k impact investment from The Phone Co-Op in 2014, their CEO explained with investors as well as suppliers they want to "buy social".

In 2018, HCT Group secured £17.8 million in funding to tackle social isolation, with the help of the investment bank ClearlySo.

== Operations ==
=== London ===
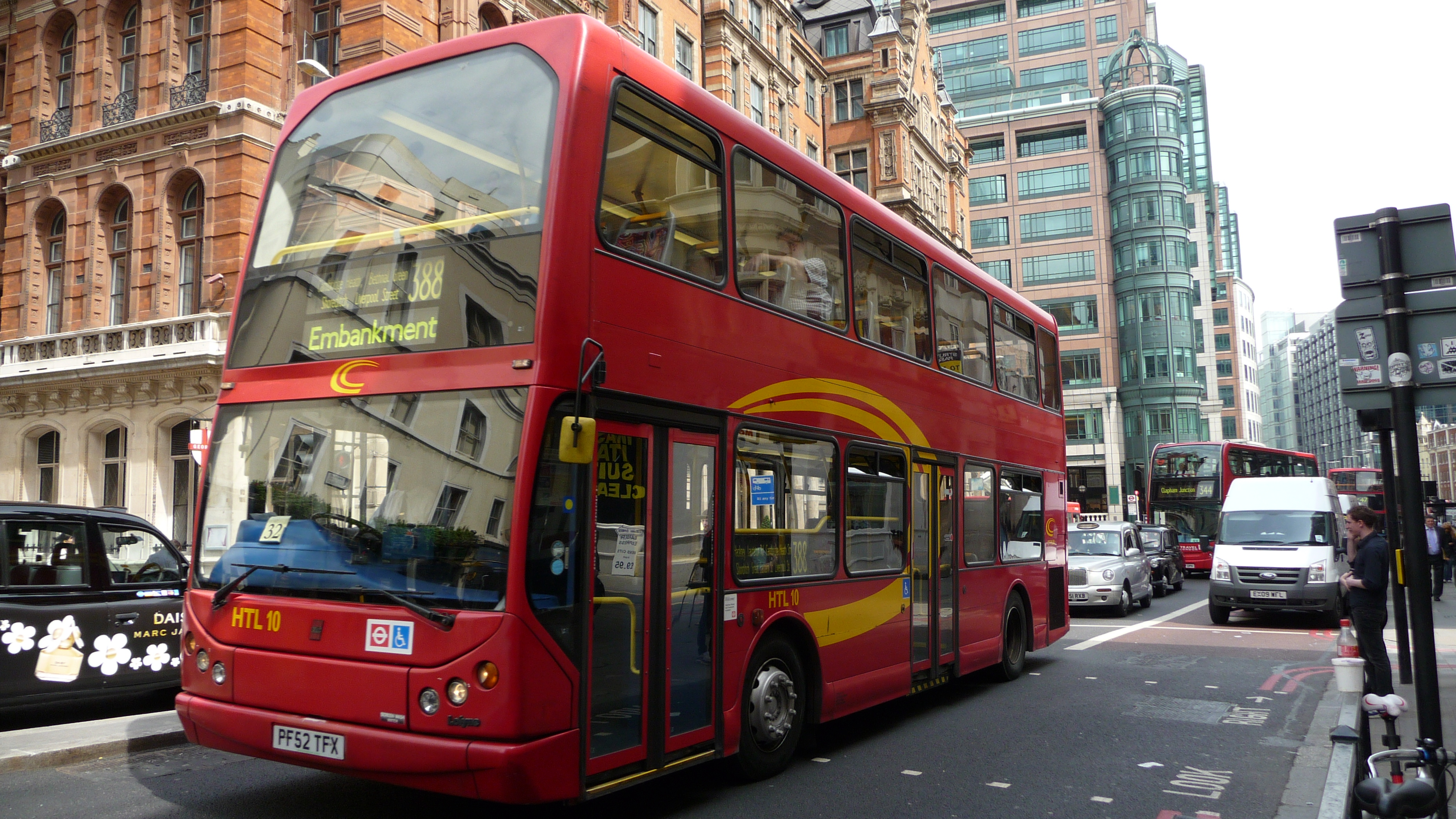
East Lancs Myllennium Lolyne bodied Dennis Trident 2 on route 388 in June 2009

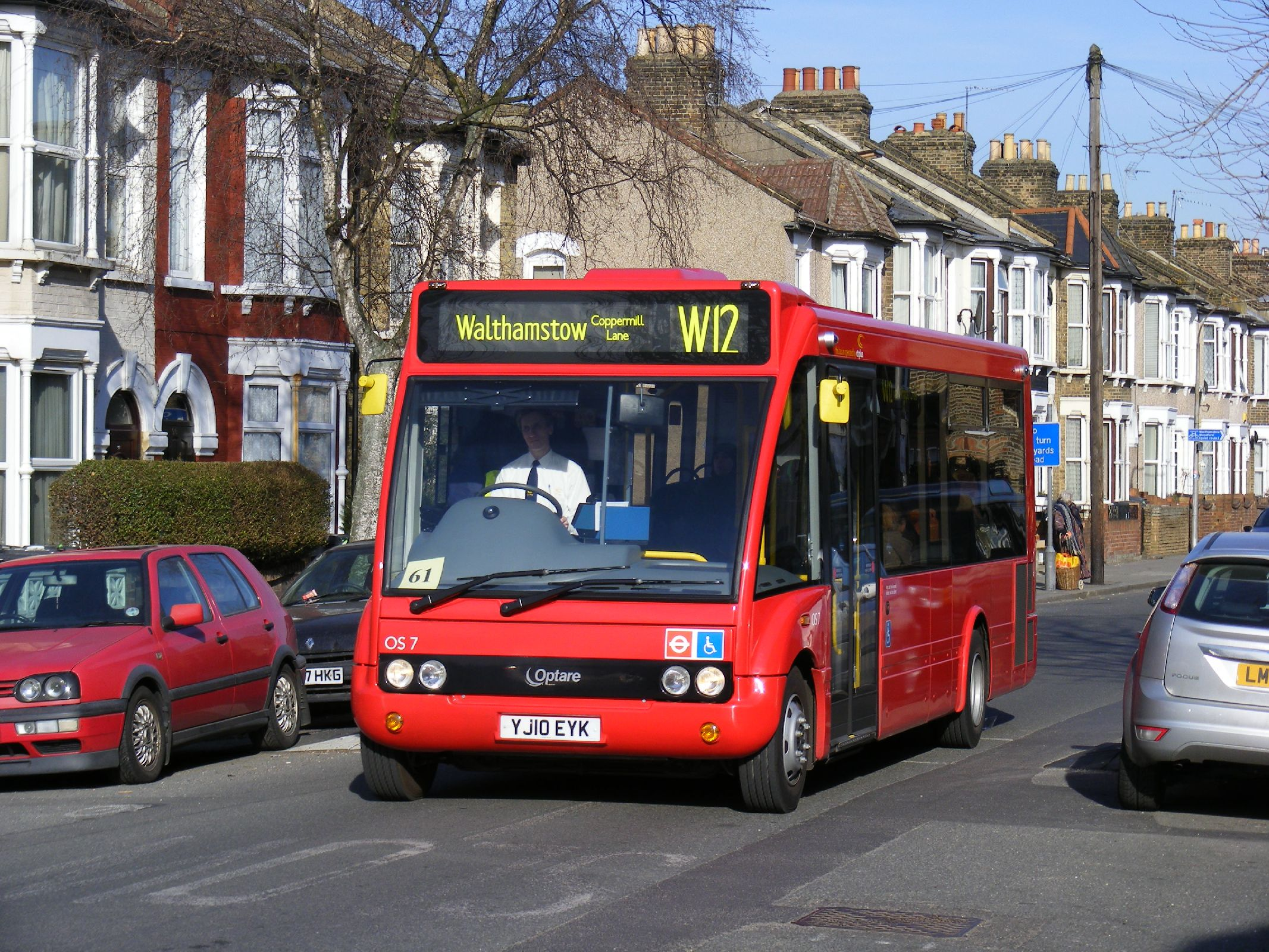
Optare Solo on route W12 in March 2010

CT Plus was founded as a wholly owned trading arm of HCT in 2001, and became a community interest company in 2007. The company competed for contracts in the marketplace, and its profits were used by HCT to support community transport or other objectives such as training for the long-term unemployed. At first they operated a Transport for London contracted service, route 153. Routes 388 and 394 were added in 2003.

In August 2019, the CT Plus brand in London was dropped with operations brought under the HCT Group banner; the brand continued to be used in Yorkshire until August 2022. In the same month, HCT ceased operating Plus Bus route 812 and entered into negotiation with Stagecoach London to sell its 160-vehicle operation, following a period of ongoing financial difficulties for HCT Group.

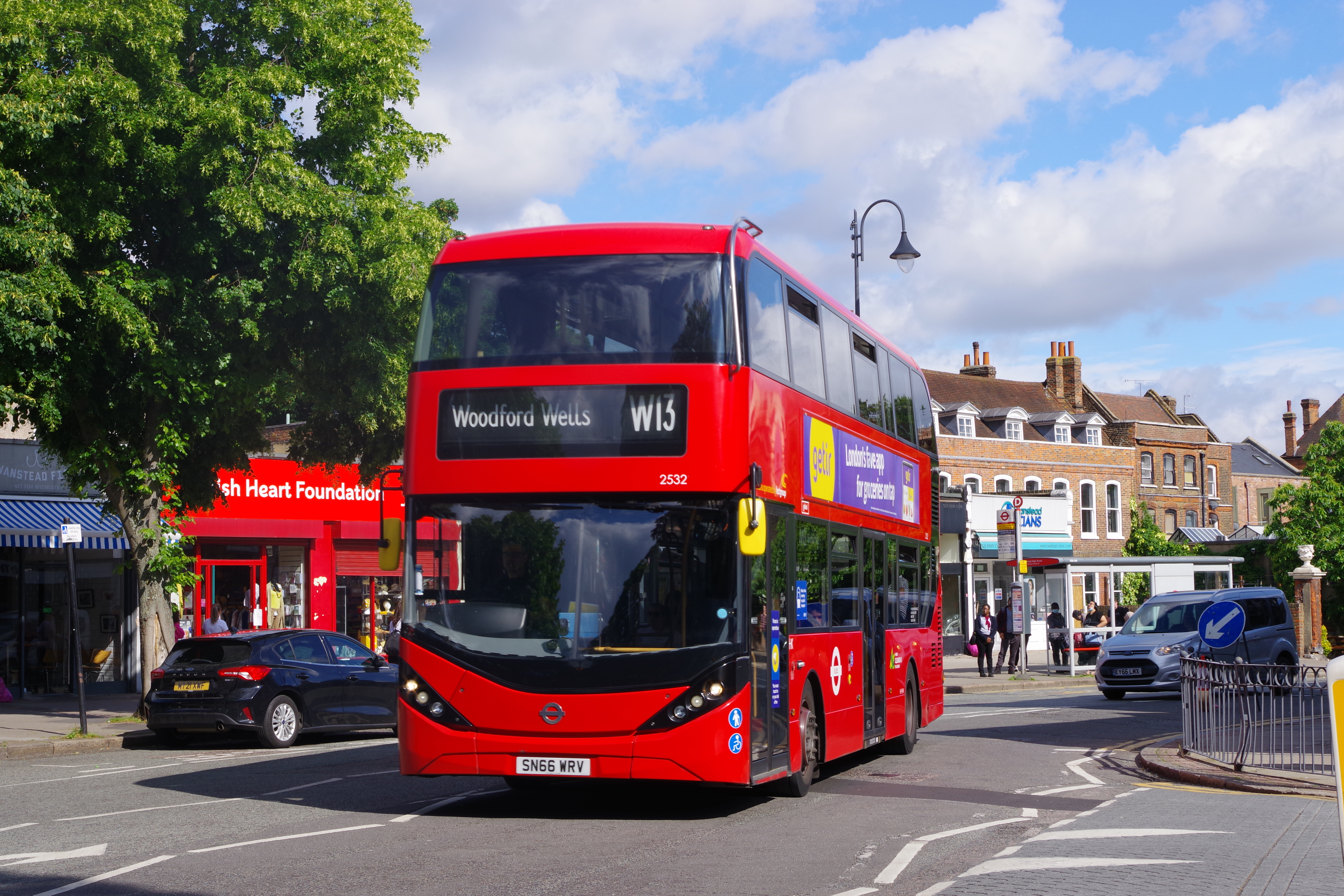
Alexander Dennis Enviro400H City on route W13 in June 2022

==== Ash Grove (HK) ====
Ash Grove bus garage in Cambridge Heath was HCT Groups' first London garage, and was shared with Arriva London. This garage operated 10 routes, including route 26 and route 394.

==== Walthamstow (AW) ====
In November 2016, HCT Group opened a second garage in Walthamstow. Before the company administration, Walthamstow garage operated routes 20, 385, 397, W11, W12, W16, W19 and 616.

==== Other London services ====
- Special Educational Needs Transport and coach and bus hire, in Waltham Forest
- Social services transport, in Kensington & Chelsea
- Day Centre & Special Educational Needs Transport, in Lambeth
- Special Educational Needs Transport, in Southwark
- Impact Group, purchased from Tower Transit in August 2018

==== Fleet ====
The Transport for London fleet consisted of 85 buses in 2014, and had grown to 159 buses before the collapse of the company in September 2022.

=== Yorkshire ===
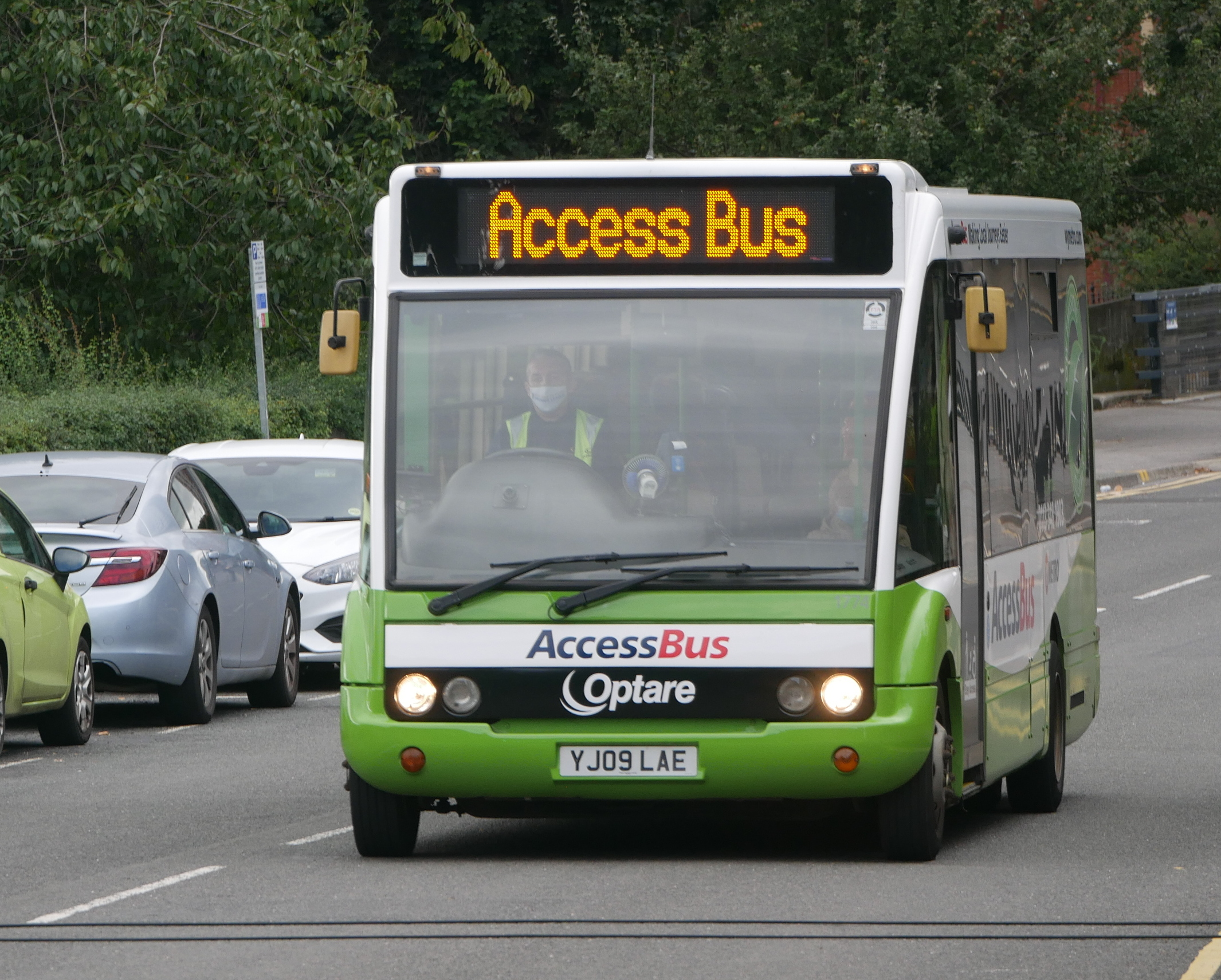
AccessBus in Leeds

CT Plus (Yorkshire) operated from depots in Brighouse, Wakefield and Leeds, with a fleet of around 110 vehicles. The services in West Yorkshire consisted mostly of West Yorkshire Metro tendered services: AccessBus, a demand responsive transport service providing local transport for those unable to use regular transport, and school buses, including some 'My bus' yellow school bus contracts. A few public routes were operated, around Wakefield, Huddersfield, Pontefract, and South Elmsall. In addition, some private contracts were operated, including two shuttle services for the NHS.

HCT Group acquired Rotherham-based independent operator Powells Bus and Coach in July 2018, integrating the company, which ran services across South Yorkshire, as a separate part of CT Plus (Yorkshire).

On 4 August 2022, the HCT Group announced that CT Plus (Yorkshire) and its Powells Bus operation would cease trading on 5 August, following a period of sustained losses due to the economic effects of the COVID-19 pandemic and rising fuel and labour costs. All bus services in West and South Yorkshire operated by CT Plus would be transferred to the regional traffic commissioner for tendering to other bus operators.

=== Bristol ===
HCT Group operated local bus services in the Bristol area under the name of Bristol Community Transport, as well as (from January 2019) the m1 metrobus service under contract to First West of England. BCT ceased operating their dial-a-ride and community transport operations on 26 August 2022 due to rising costs, with their local bus services following a week later on 2 September. When the business closed, operation of the m1 transferred to First, along with the 21 vehicles branded for the route.

=== Minor operations ===
HCT Group also operated a number of smaller community and mainstream bus services across the UK.

- Guernsey public bus services, branded as buses.gg
- Jersey public bus services, branded as LibertyBus
- Derbyshire Community Transport
- Manchester Community Transport, 2018 to 2020
- Park and ride bus service in Hull, 2010 to 2014

== Community transport services ==
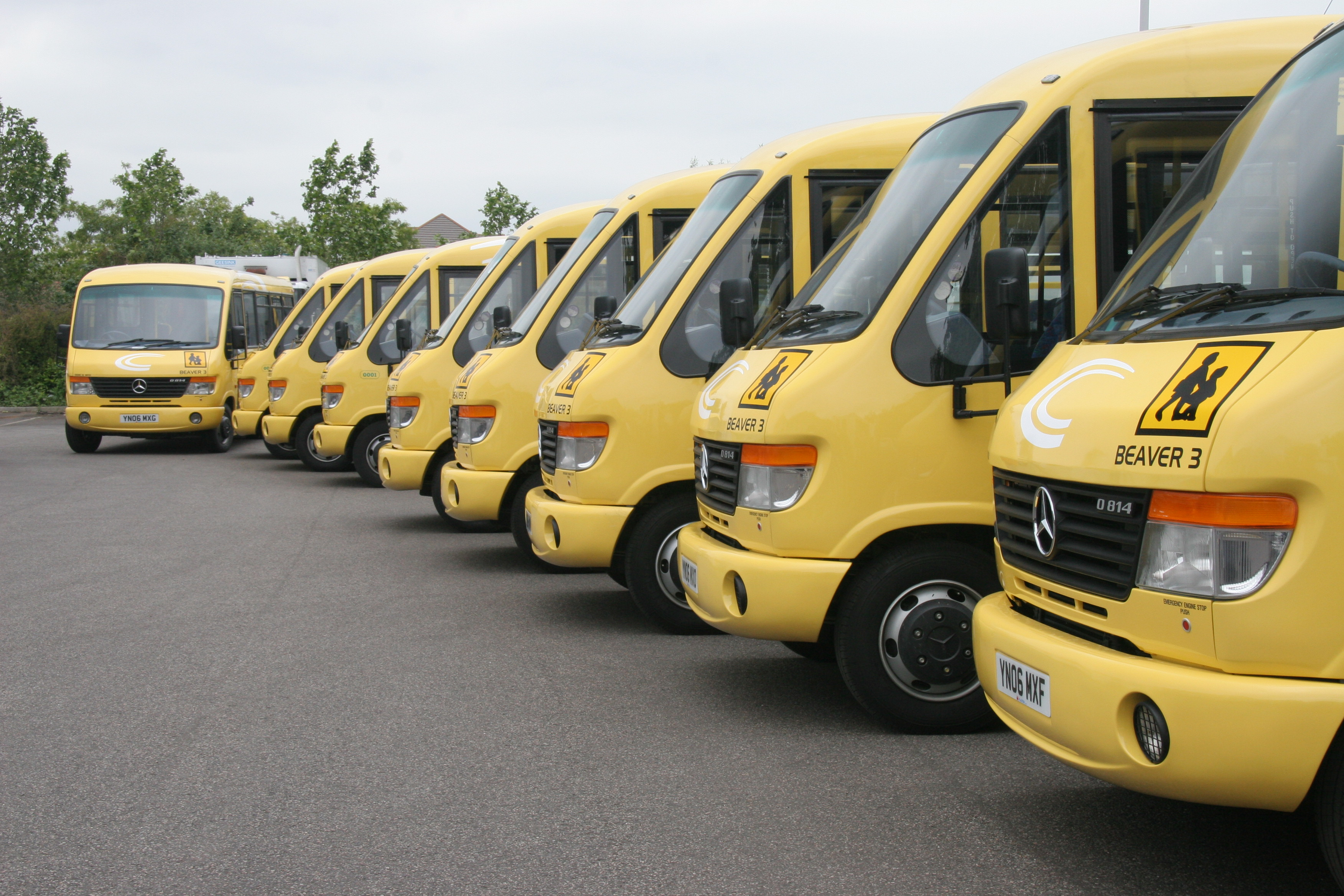
Special needs education transport services in Waltham Forest

Before the company fell into administration, HCT Group operated:

- Accessible minibuses for community and voluntary groups
- 'Capital Call' – a door-to-door service provided by private hire vehicles for users with mobility difficulties
- 'ScootAbility' – a mobility scooter home delivery service
- 'PlusBus' – a bus service for those who have difficulty accessing mainstream transport
- 'Door 2 Door' – a transport service provided by volunteers for Hackney residents
- 'Integrated Transport Solutions' – a transport contract management service
- 'YourCar' – a door-to-door service for registered users with mobility difficulties in the London Boroughs of Lambeth and Southwark

== Education and training ==
HCT Group provided education services supported by the Learning and Skills Council and the London Development Agency. The courses include bus driver training, particularly for women, social care, and management.

== Corporate strategy ==
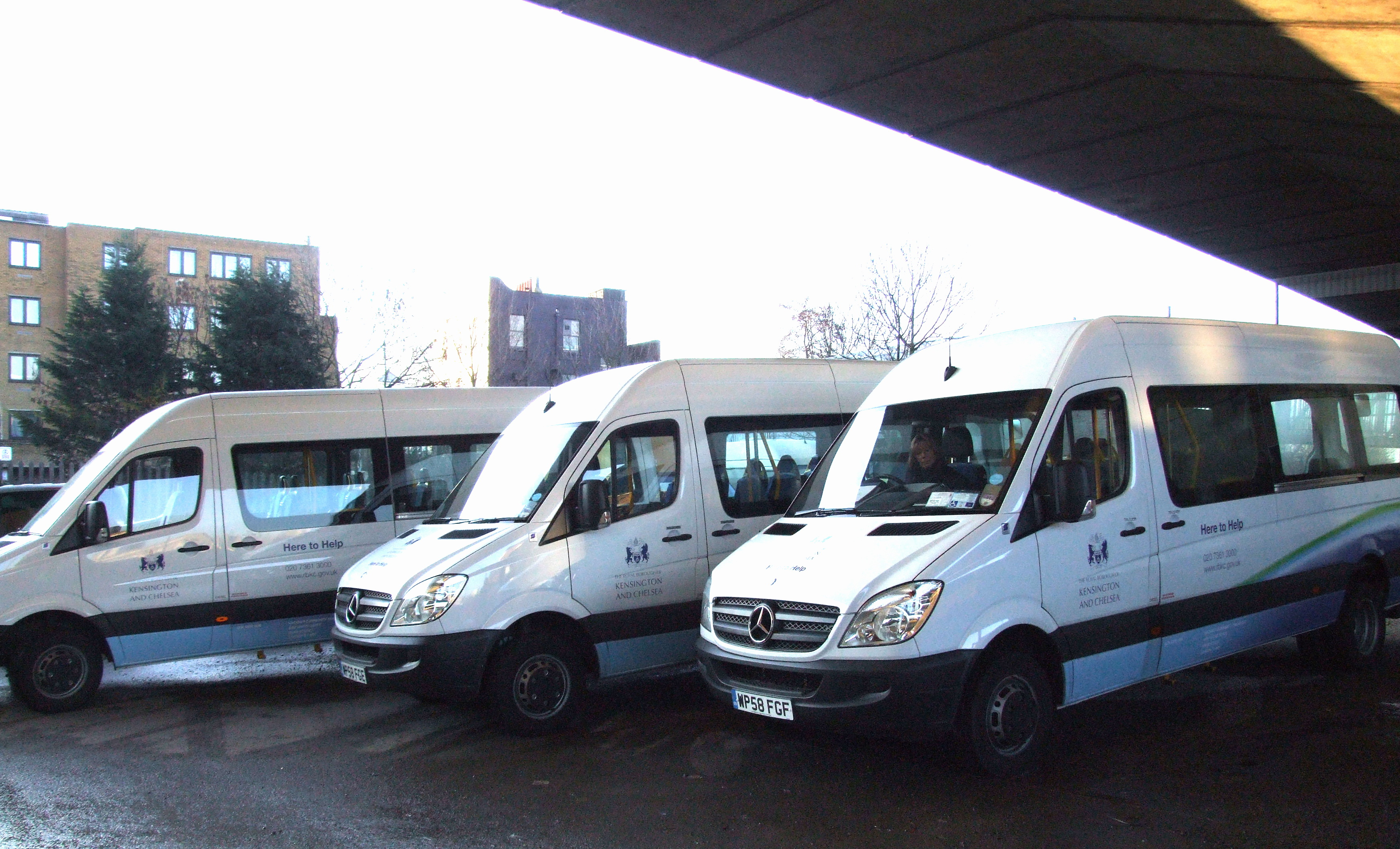
Social services transport in Kensington & Chelsea

HCT Group's corporate strategy was to generate profits from providing commercial transport services, then to use these profits to provide community transport services for people unable to use mainstream transport. The two modes, public transport and special need transport, are fully integrated under their model: "the investment in responsive community transport services is made possible by running the commercial activity well." The Financial Times reported in 2010 that turnover had "grown by about 25 per cent a year for the past eight years and is expected to top £20m in the year to March 31, 2010, when profits will be around £1m." HCT's rapid growth is achieved by merging with smaller community transport organisations.

HCT Group CEO Dai Powell, in an article explaining the group's strategy, said the business aims to double in size every five or so years for the foreseeable future, seeing scale as "...crucial. The better we do commercially, the more we can do for the communities we serve as a social enterprise", and that the strategy is "maximising the good that we do... to be as bold as a commercial firm, but to the benefit of our communities, not to the owners of capital. It also has the advantage of keeping our social mission absolutely central to our approach." Powell contrasted this approach to that of many third sector organisations "where risk is to be mitigated at worst and eliminated at best. This is simply hopeless for rapid growth." He describes the process as "...so much more rewarding than spending your days "maximising shareholder value", whatever that means."
