= Sandringham Road =

Residential street in Dalston, East London

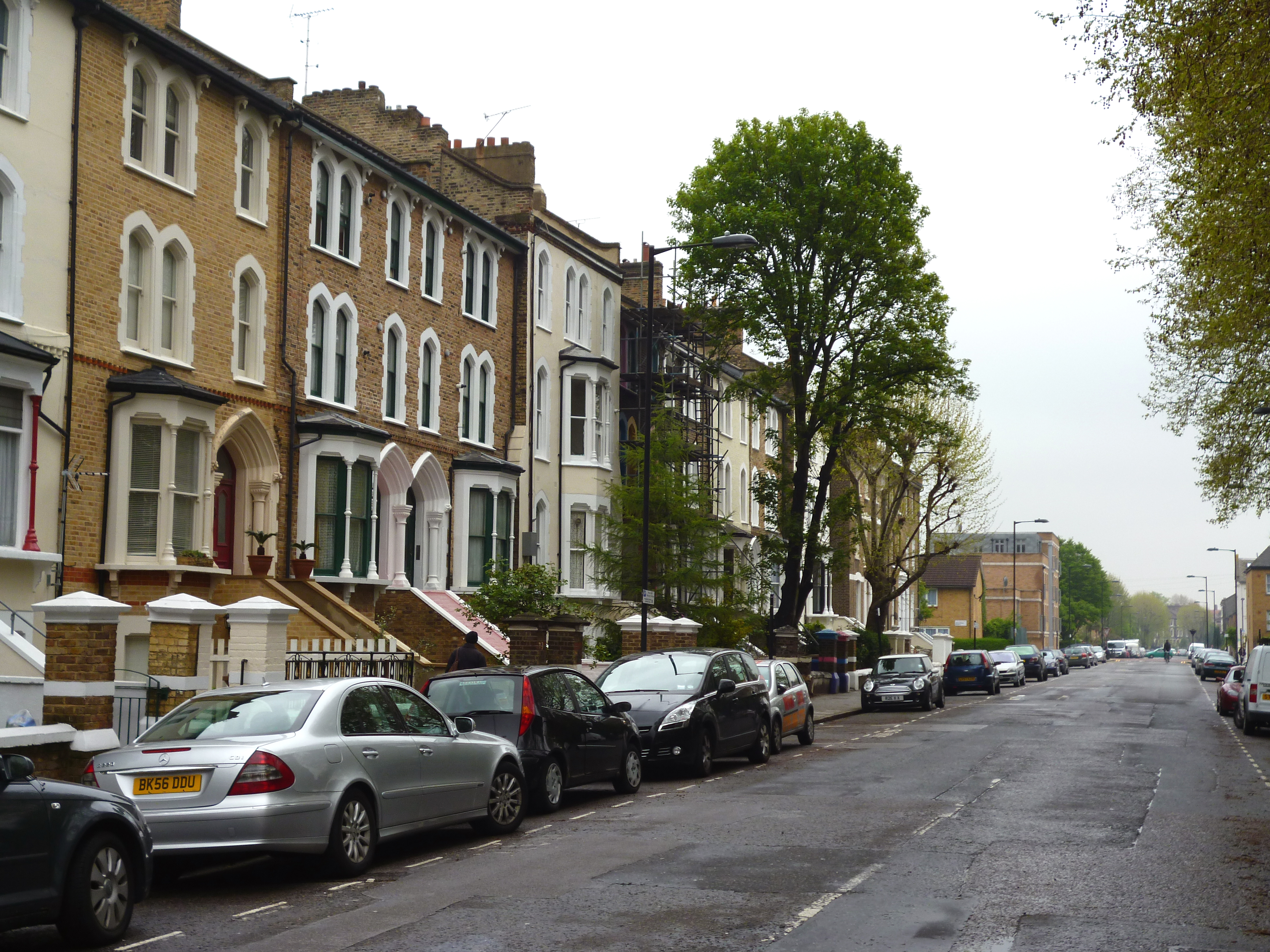
- Sandringham Road in 2012
- Interactive map of Sandringham Road
- Location: Dalston, East London
- Postal code: E8
- Nearest train station: Dalston Kingsland; Dalston Junction
- Coordinates: 51.55°N 0.07°W

Sandringham Road is a mostly residential street in Dalston, East London, in the London Borough of Hackney, stretching from Kingsland High Street at its western end to Amhurst Road at its east.

== History ==
=== Urbanisation ===
Until the middle of the 19th Century, the land now occupied by Sandringham Road consisted of fields and market gardens, forming part of the extensive Tyssen-Amhurst estate. In 1862, work began on St Mark's Church, designed by Chester Cheston, the son of the Deputy Steward of the Manor of Hackney. The church was consecrated in August 1870.

Sandringham Road was laid out around the church in 1867 and built over the next two years, primarily by Charles Cleverley Paine and George Bidnell Jordain. In 1870, the Stanley Arms pub opened at the road's intersection with Montague Road. It was renamed the Lord Stanley in 1901 and continued operating under this name until its closure in 1997.

In the 1890s, the road was also home to the Hackney School of Art.

=== Jewish immigration ===
In the late 1880s, the New Dalston Synagogue temporarily operated in the street, before moving to a permanent location in adjoining Birkbeck Road in 1887. By the beginning of the 20th Century, Hackney was home to one of the largest Jewish communities in Britain, and many Jewish families settled in Sandringham Road.

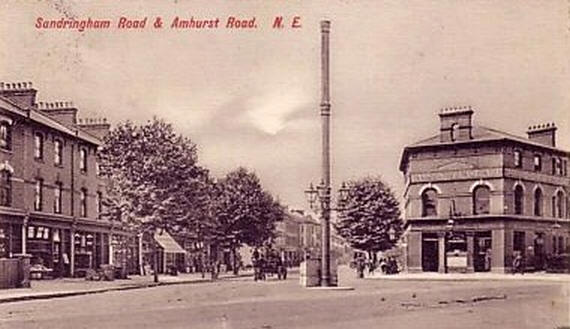
The Mitford Tavern in 1910

Following its formation in 1932, the British Union of Fascists was also active in the area, and its members frequently congregated at the Mitford Tavern, which stood at the intersection of Sandringham Road and Amhurst Road. Altercations between the group and the local Jewish community, including members of the anti-fascist 43 Group, were a regular occurrence.

In August 1947, a confrontation between members of the crypto-fascist British League of Ex-Servicemen and socialist counter-protestors spilled into Sandringham Road, where the latter group was addressed by leading anti-fascist writer Frederic Mullally.

=== Windrush generation ===
The post-war years saw an influx of African-Caribbean immigration to London, and Dalston became a centre of Black British life and culture in the capital. Johnson's Cafe, the neighbourhood's first Black-owned restaurant, opened at the corner of Sandringham Road and Birkbeck Road, sharing a premises with a record shop run by Jamaican reggae star Roy Shirley.

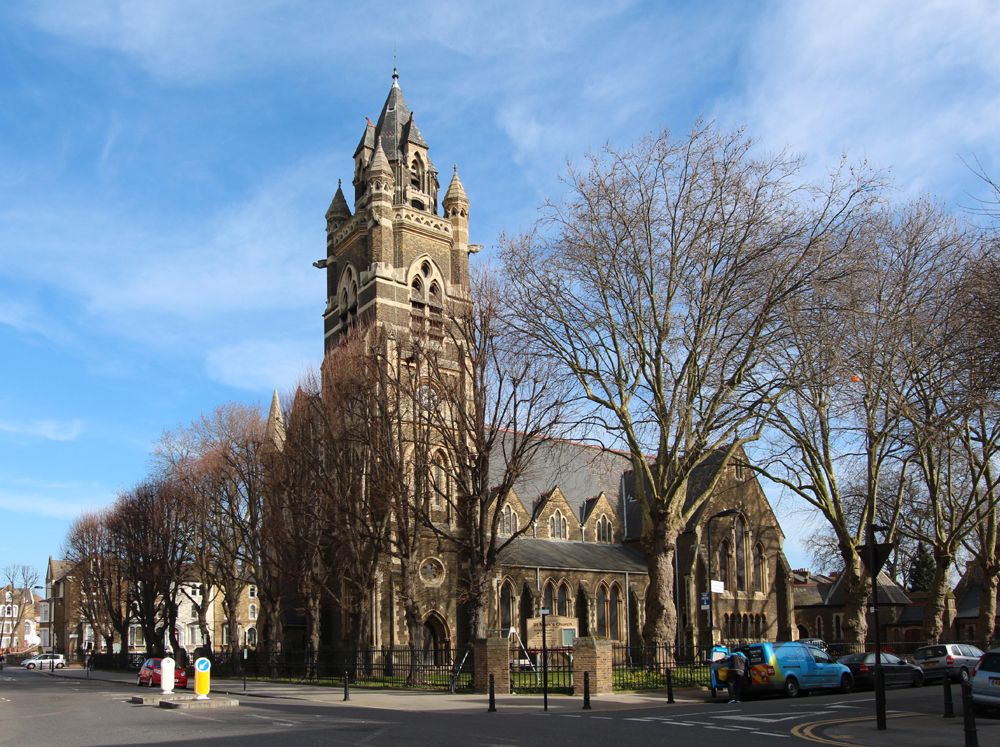
St Marks Church in 2015

Next door, barber Ugent Knight operated the All Nations barbershop, and opened up the building's basement as a rehearsal space for local bands. Under the same name, the shop later became a vegan Caribbean restaurant, until a 2022 fire forced its relocation to nearby Kingsland High Street.

A former synagogue at the corner of Sandringham Road and Montague Road was converted into Roots Pool Community Centre, which became a haunt for prominent reggae musicians including Gene Rondo and Leon Leiffer, who met and organised the British Reggae Artists Famine Appeal at the club in 1985. Frustrated by the lack of African-Caribbean artists included in the previous year's Band Aid supergroup, they recorded their own charity single 'Let's Make Africa Green Again' to raise money for Ethiopian famine relief.

In November 1981, the Dalston Children's Centre opened at 80 Sandringham Road, providing a 'radical alternative to existing provision for children of all ages ... along actively anti-racist, anti-sexist lines'. The centre moved to nearby Greenwood Lane the following year.

=== The Front Line ===
In the 1980s, Sandringham Road became known locally as the 'Front Line', for the frequent clashes that took place there between the Black community and officers from nearby Stoke Newington police station. There were a number of uprisings against the street's heavy police presence during this period, including in July 1981, following a raid on Johnson's Cafe, and in July 1983, after officers began using Alsatians during stop-and-search patrols.

Sandringham Road had long been home to the local cannabis trade, and as the decade progressed, crack cocaine also became widely available. In 1987, Metropolitan Police Commissioner Sir Kenneth Newman identified the street as one of the "areas where crime is at its worst, where drug dealing is intolerably overt", a characterisation disputed by local residents.

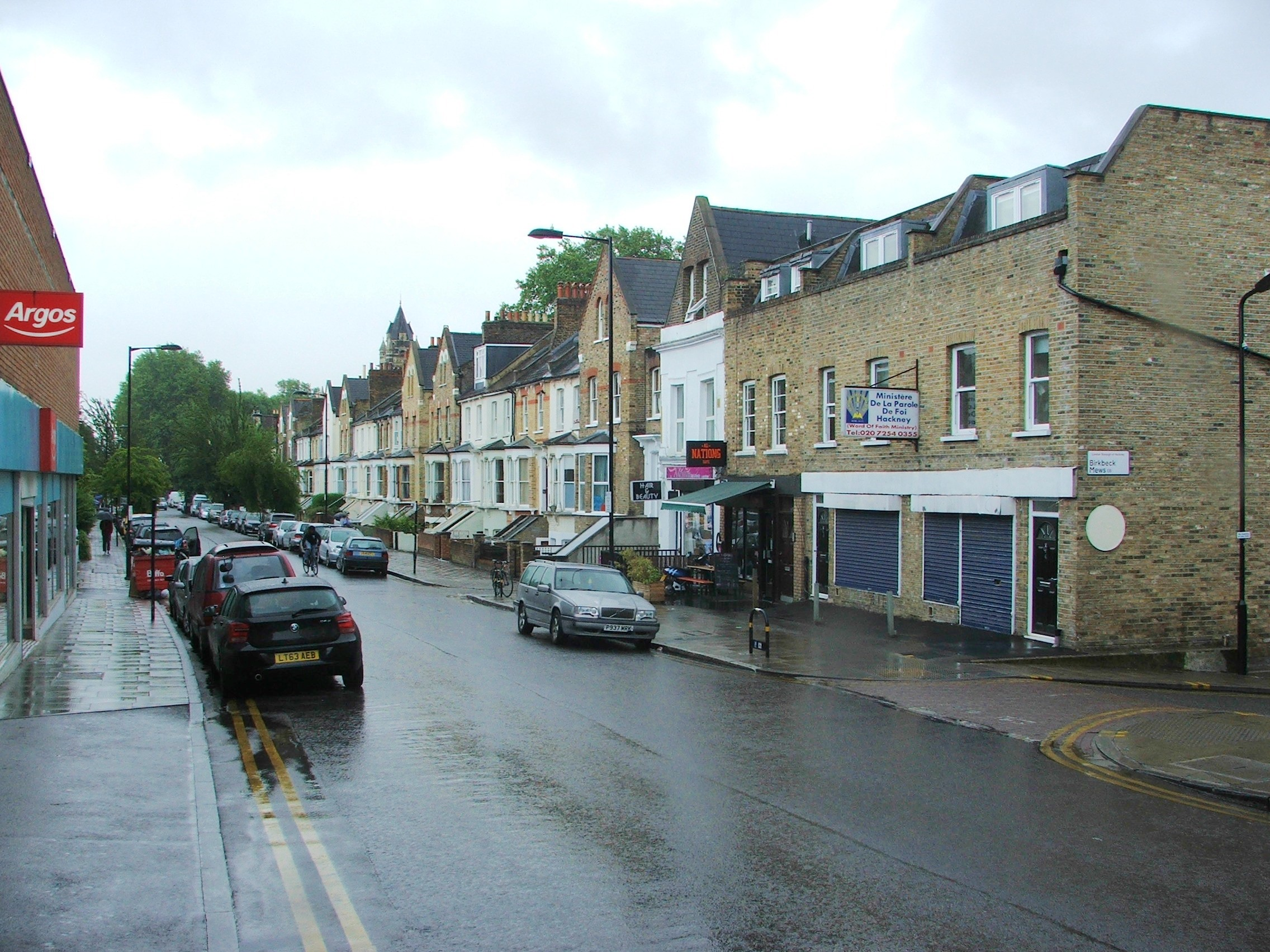
The former epicentre of the Front Line, pictured in 2015

By 1991, almost a quarter of London's crack cocaine seizures and arrests took place in Hackney, with Sandringham Road the centre of the trade. That year, Sandringham Road resident Pearl Cameron was arrested for selling drugs from the back window of her flat, known locally as 'The Shop'. While in custody, Cameron alleged that her supplier was Detective Constable Roy Lewandowski, a local police officer.

In November of that year, Operation Jackpot was launched to investigate corruption at Stoke Newington police station. It would grow into one of the largest corruption inquiries in the history of the Police Complaints Authority. The following January, local MP Brian Sedgemore tabled an early day motion in which he criticised "nasty, vile and corrupt" police officers who had "betrayed the trust of ... those who live in and around Sandringham Road".

In February 1992, the Hackney Community Defence Association, a neighbourhood pressure group, named 30 officers it claimed were involved in a drugs racket on Sandringham Road, demanding a judicial inquiry. Its report, 'A Crime is a Crime is a Crime', documented 143 cases of police corruption taken up by the group in a three-year period.

That November, the Police Complaints Authority sent a report naming 25 officers to the Director of Public Prosecutions. Three were accused of profiting from the Sandringham Road drugs trade, while others were alleged to have fabricated evidence, planted drugs and conspired to pervert the course of justice. Lewandowski was alleged to have made '£1,000 a week for his crack, and on one occasion £2,000'.

Two years later, the Crown Prosecution Service announced that charges had been brought against two officers for conspiracy to pervert the course of justice. They were subsequently tried and acquitted at the Old Bailey. The CPS claimed that there was 'insufficient evidence' to bring charges against 44 others against whom allegations had been made, though the Metropolitan Police did pay more than £500,000 in damages as a result of related civil actions.

=== 1990s ===
In January 1992, a disused housing office at the intersection of Sandringham Road and Amhurst Road was converted into a temporary 'police office' in an effort to combat the drugs trade, which had by then moved to the eastern end of the street.

That year, raids were carried out on the Jerk Chicken takeaway—which closed after two raids in a fortnight—Ladbrokes betting shop, the Lord Stanley, and Roots Pool, all in the immediate vicinity of the police office. In May 2000, a raid on the Casablanca cafe, which had opened in the premises formally occupied by Jerk Chicken, resulted in 19 arrests and the seizure of £300,000 of crack cocaine. A further raid in August 2014 resulted in the temporary closure of the restaurant.

The late 1980s and early 1990s saw a wave of Turkish immigration to the area. The Markazul Uloom mosque was established at the western end of Sandringham Road in 1997 in response to overcrowding at the nearby Shacklewell Lane Mosque. As well as daily prayer services, the mosque provides evening language classes in Arabic, Bengali and Urdu.

=== Gentrification ===
In the early years of the 21st Century, Dalston was subject to a period of intense gentrification, accelerated by the announcement of the East London line extension and the reopening of Dalston Junction station. In 2009, The Guardian declared the area 'the coolest place in London'. Property prices in Sandringham Road and the surrounding area rose rapidly.

The shopping parade at the street's eastern end became home to the Michelin-starred restaurant Casa Fofō in 2019.

In 2026, Sandringham Road saw a brief return to its reputation as a centre of Dalston's music scene after squatters occupied a shuttered Argos that had operated continuously on the street since the 1970s. Weekly raves were organised in the space, with police twice shutting down events under the Criminal Justice and Public Order Act 1994. The building is now being redeveloped into an extension of the Staycity Hotel on Kingsland High Street.

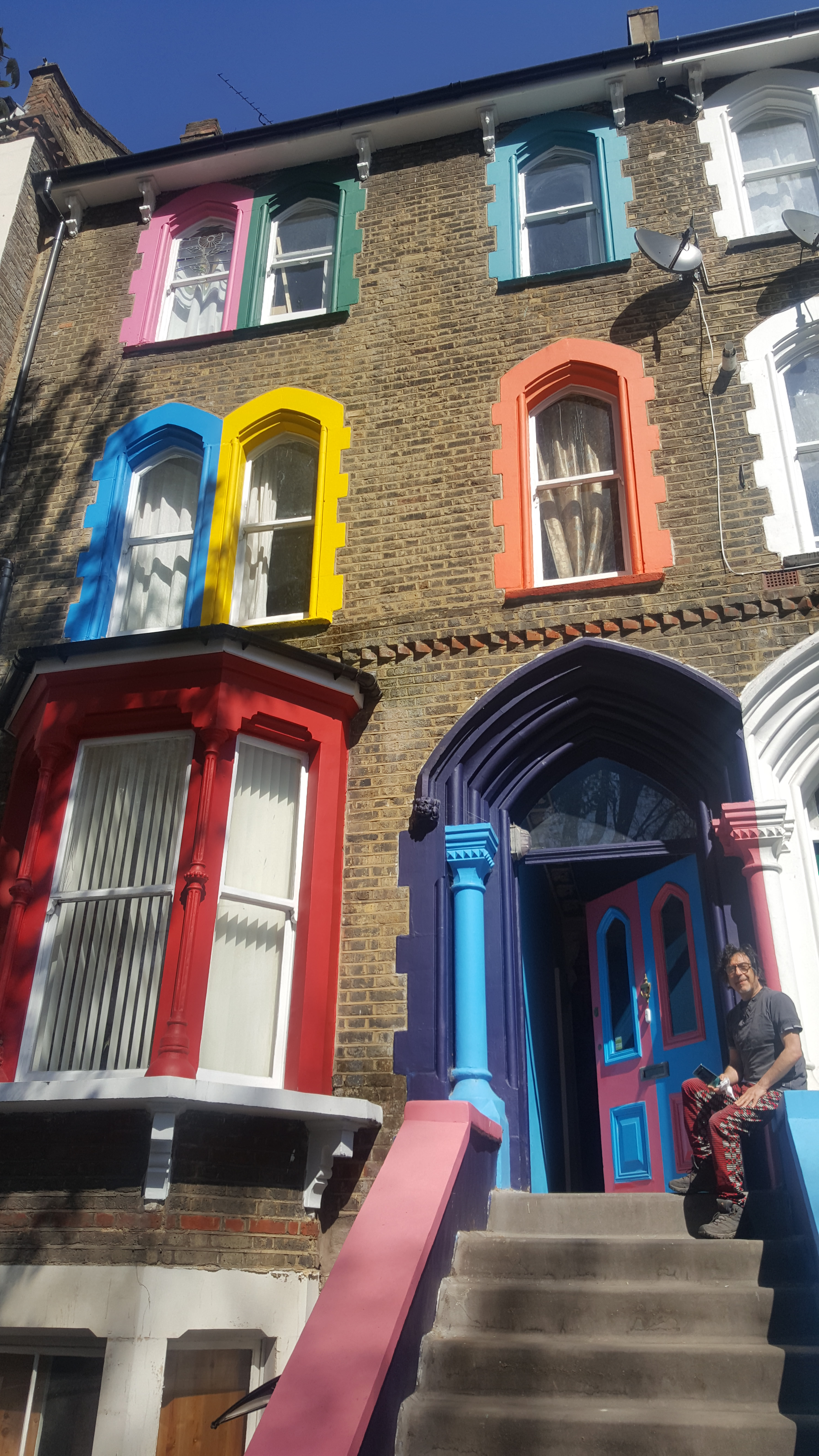
Lennie Lee outside The Rainbow House in 2021

== Notable residents ==
- South African artist Lennie Lee has lived at 81 Sandringham Road—known locally as the 'Rainbow House' for its distinctive exterior paintwork—since 1985, opening his doors as a makeshift gallery and party space. His extensive donated art collection features paintings by artists including Martin Maloney and David Burrows.

== In popular culture ==
- The post-apocalyptic action film 28 Weeks Later (2007) includes a scene in which Tammy (Imogen Poots) and Andy (Mackintosh Muggleton) encounter an pile-up of abandoned vehicles at the intersection of Sandringham Road and St Mark's Rise.
- In Run Fatboy Run (2007), Dennis (Simon Pegg) moves into the basement flat at 73 Sandringham Road after leaving his fiancé on their wedding day.
