= Dalston bus garage =

Coordinates: 51°32′21″N 0°3′50″W

- Interactive map of Dalston bus garage

Location
- Location: Shrubland Road, Dalston

Characteristics
- Operator: London Transport
- Depot code: D

History
- Opened: 1906
- Closed: 1981

Dalston bus garage was a bus depot in Dalston, London, England.

It was opened by Motor Bus Co in 1906, passing with the business to Vanguard Motors in 1907, who in turn sold out to the London General Omnibus Company in 1908. It was built on the site of a former cavalry barracks. It was closed by London Transport in 1981, when it was replaced by a new garage at Ash Grove.

From 1973 until 1976, six Leyland Nationals and six Metro-Scanias single deckers operated out of on route S2 from Clapton Pond to Bromley-by-Bow tube station on comparative trials, to see which would be most suitable for future London Transport orders. The route could only take single deckers, due to a number of low bridges en route.
