= German Hospital, Dalston =

The German Hospital
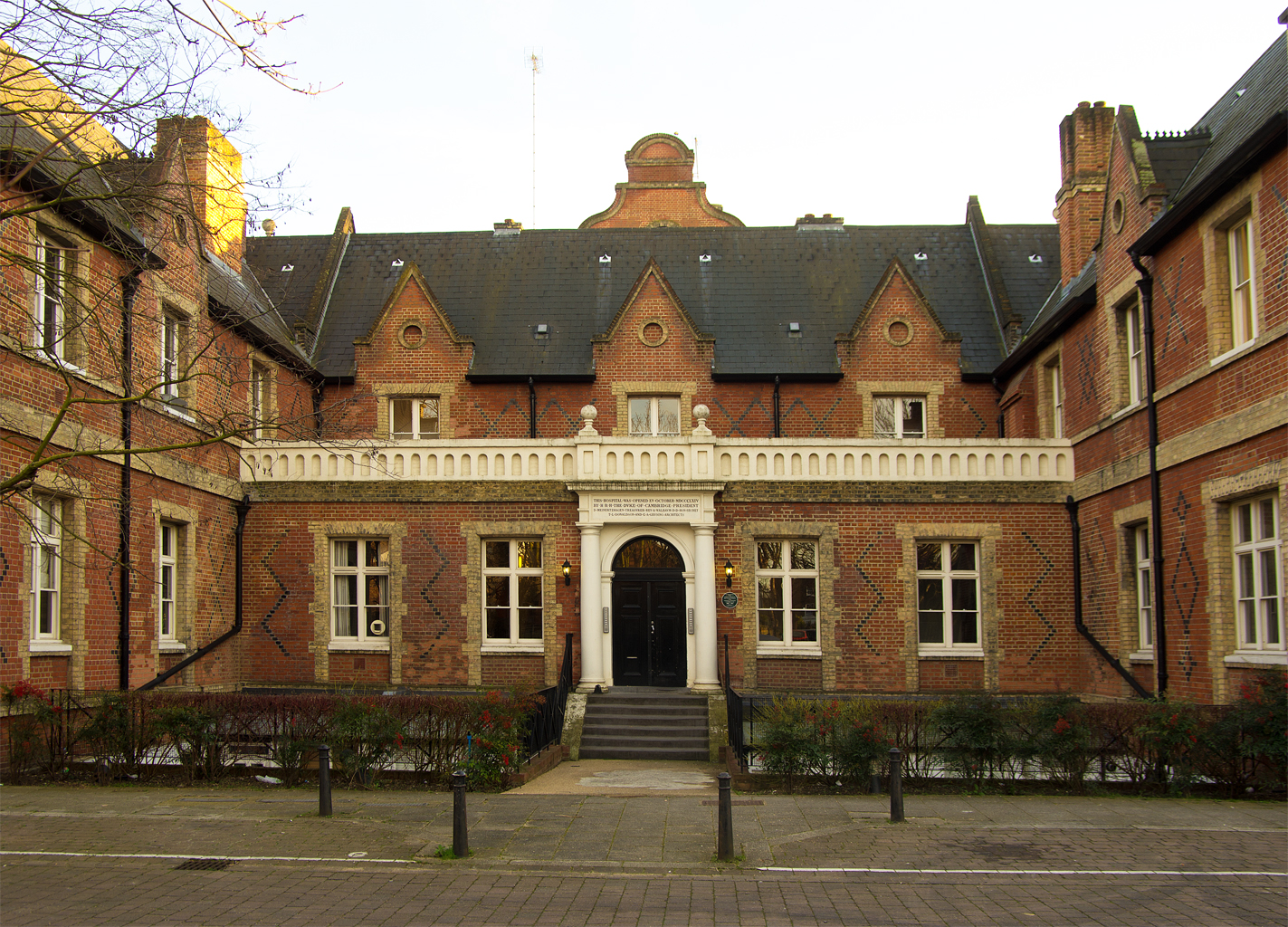
- Entrance of the former German Hospital

- Location within Hackney

Geography
- Location: Dalston, London, England, United Kingdom
- Coordinates: 51.5467°N 0.0668°W

Organisation
- Care system: NHS England

History
- Founded: 1845
- Closed: 1987

Links
- Lists: Hospitals in England

The German Hospital, Dalston, was a hospital in Dalston, East London.

== History ==
The hospital was established in 1845 to offer free treatment to London’s then large German-speaking community which had a significant presence in the East End.

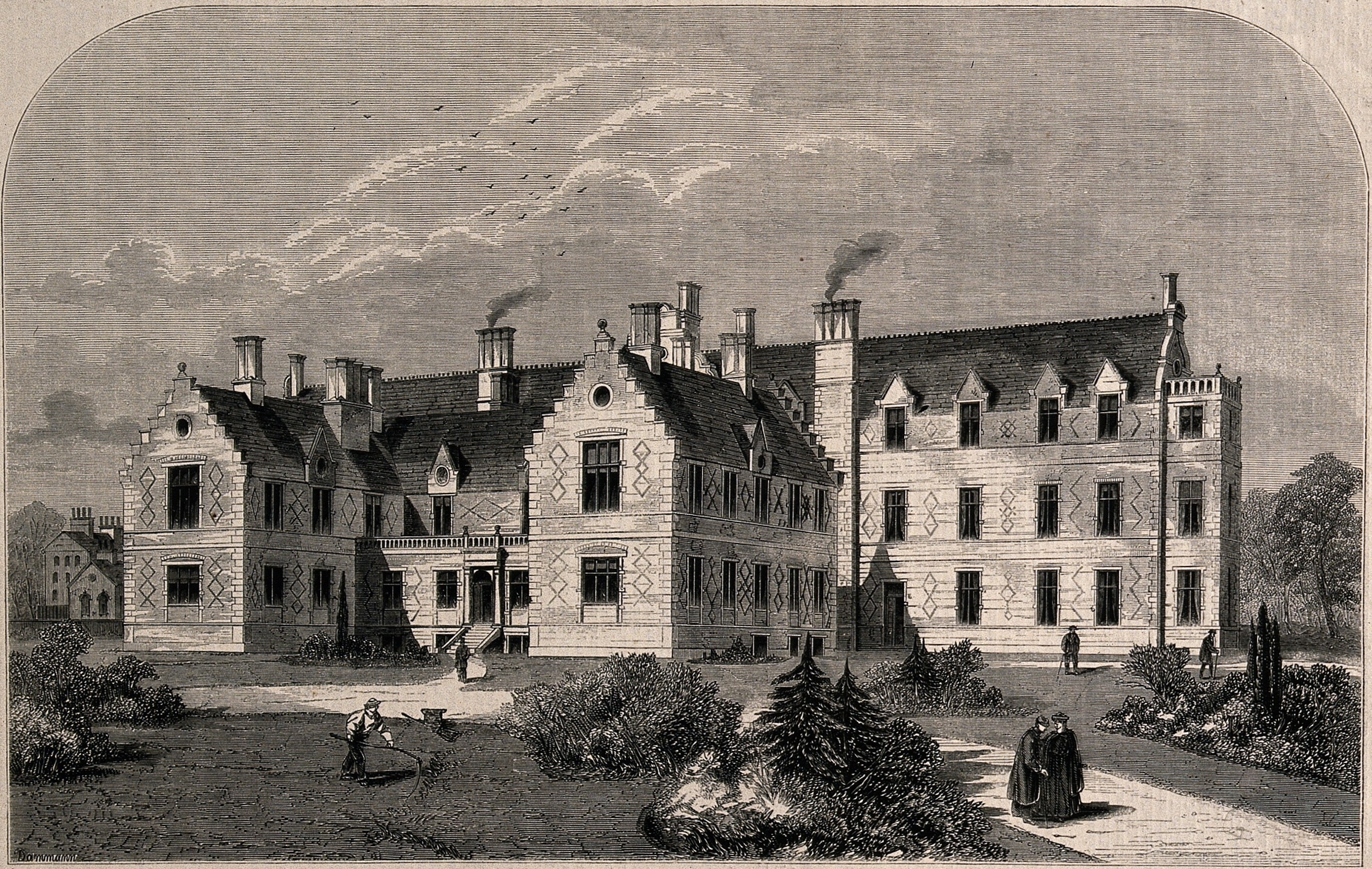
The hospital in an 1864 engraving.

The hospital’s German speaking staff remained on site during the First World War, but were interned during the Second World War with their places taken by British staff. It joined the National Health Service in 1948 offering local services including a maternity ward until becoming a psychiatric hospital in 1974. The hospital, popularly known as ‘The German’, closed in 1987 and patients were transferred to Homerton Hospital. Some of its buildings are now used for affordable housing. Parts of the buildings are grade II listed.
