= The Towers of Hackney =

Coordinates: 51°32.5′N 0°4.5′W

The Towers of Hackney was one of many names used to describe a folk art sculpture park made out of large wooden structures in Dalston, London Borough of Hackney. Other names include "The Castle of Hackney", "Snippa" and "Silentpark". The sculpture park was developed by different people living in the area for almost 30 years, and was demolished in 2009.

Just as the participants shifted so did the overall appearance of the structures. The park was also used as a children's playground and a community garden. Artist Emanuel Almborg used the site and the stories about it as inspiration for his project The Rest Is Silence, which has resulted in talks, exhibitions and a book.

The sculpture was dismantled in January 2009, to make way for new developments in the area.
