= Dalston Superstore =

LGBTQ bar and events venue in London

Coordinates: 51.55010°N 0.07535°W

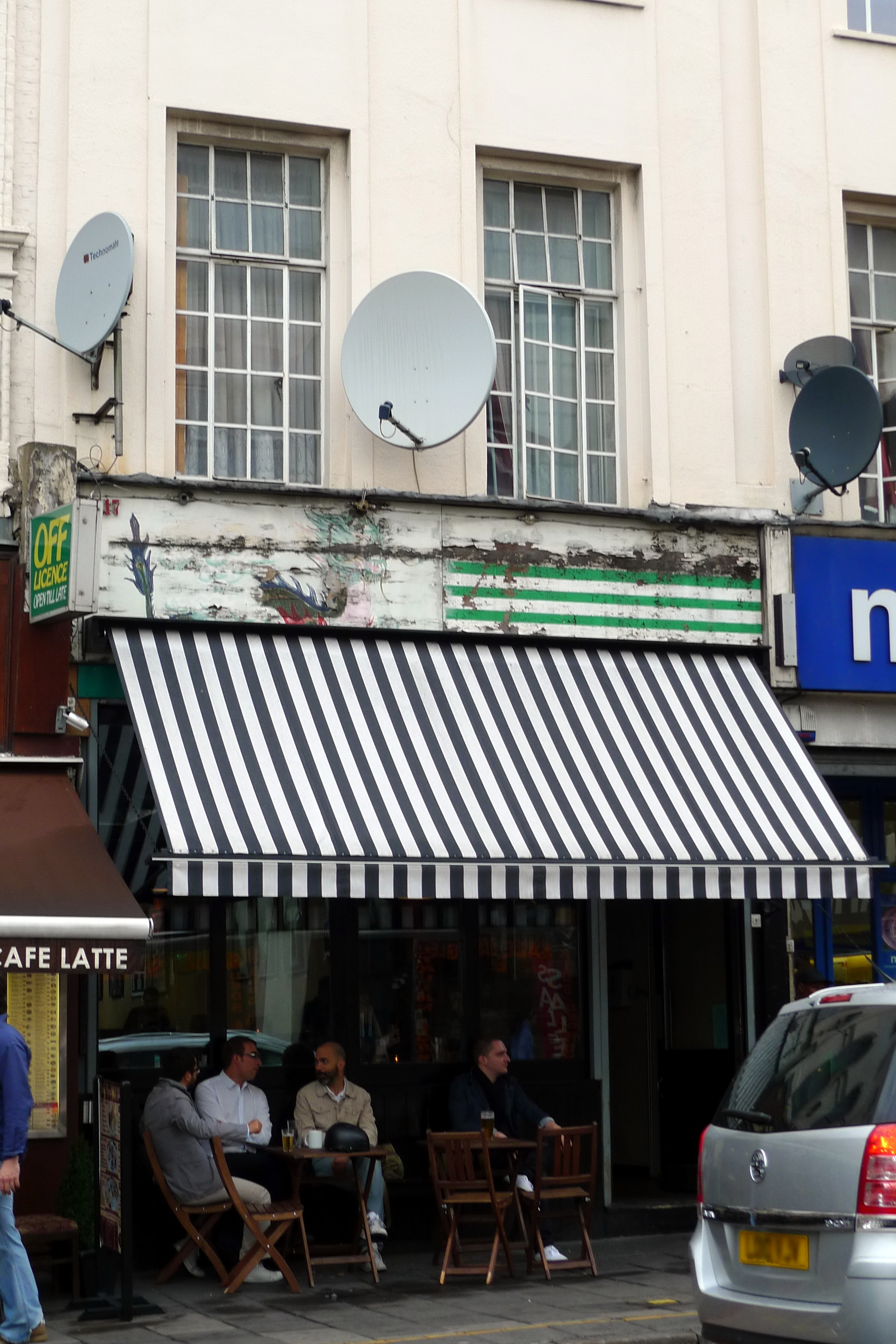
- The outside of the bar in 2010.
- Interactive map of Dalston Superstore
- Address: 117 Kingsland High St, London, E8 2PB
- Location: Dalston, London, England
- Owner: Dan Beaumont
- Capacity: 220
- Type: Night club

Construction
- Opened: May 2009

Website
- https://dalstonsuperstore.com/

Dalston Superstore is an LGBTQ bar and events venue in London. It was opened in May 2009 by Dan Beaumont and Matt Tucker. It hosts a number of club nights and drag events, with each one's individual audiences covering a diverse range of identities within the LGBTQ community.

Both Time Out and Cosmopolitan have listed it as one of London's best club venues.
