= Dalston =

Area of East London, England

Coordinates: 51.545°N 0.070°W

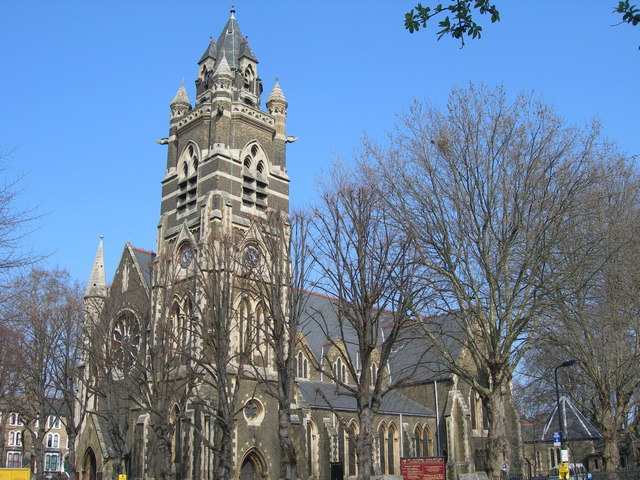
- St. Mark's Church – "Cathedral of the East End"

- Location within Greater London
- OS grid reference: TQ345845
  - Charing Cross: 4 mi (6.4 km) SW
- London borough: Hackney
- Ceremonial county: Greater London
- Region: London
- Country: England
- Sovereign state: United Kingdom
- Post town: London
- Postcode district: E8
- Postcode district: N1, N16
- Dialling code: 020
- Police: Metropolitan
- Fire: London
- Ambulance: London
- UK Parliament: Hackney North and Stoke Newington; Hackney South and Shoreditch
- London Assembly: North East

Dalston (/ˈdɔːlstən/) is an area of Hackney, East London, in the London Borough of Hackney. It is four miles (six kilometres) northeast of Charing Cross. Dalston began as a hamlet on either side of Dalston Lane and as the area urbanised, the term also came to apply to surrounding areas including Kingsland and Shacklewell, all three of which being part of the ancient parish of Hackney.

The area has experienced a high degree of gentrification in recent years, a process accelerated by the East London line extension, now part of London Overground, and the reopening of Dalston Junction railway station, part of London's successful bid to host the 2012 Olympics.

== Bounds ==
Dalston has never been an administrative unit, and partly for this reason the boundaries are not formally defined. There are generally understood boundaries in the south and west, but less clarity to the north and east. There is an electoral ward of the same name which covers a part of the northwest of Dalston.

Dalston's boundaries (taking in Kingsland and Shacklewell, but not De Beauvoir Town, which is also sometimes associated with Dalston) are described with more or less precision below:

- South: Dalston takes Hackney's southern border with Shoreditch. Albion Drive forms much of this boundary.
- West: The originally Roman A10 road (under the names, south to north: Kingsland Road, Kingsland High St, Stoke Newington Road) is widely understood as Dalston's western margin. The exception is that both sides of Kingsland High St are included – here Dalston takes Hackney's western boundary as it crosses the A10 to take in a small area bounded by Boleyn Road and the Crossway, to include Dalston Kingsland railway station. The western boundary corresponds with the western side of the E8 postal area with which Dalston is associated, though postcodes are not intended to define districts, and the postal area also takes in areas that are not ever described as part of Dalston.
- North: There is not a tradition of a clear northern boundary with West Hackney. Dalston's association with the E8 postal area means that its 'sphere of self-identification' does not extend far, if at all, beyond the postcode boundary, and no further north than Farleigh Road.
- East: Between Downs Road and Amhurst Road, the physical barrier of the railway embankment marks the postcode boundary with Lower Clapton. There is little tradition of a boundary with the central Hackney area except that it is sometimes said that Dalston extends as far as the park at London Fields.

== History ==
The name Dalston is thought to have derived from Deorlaf's tun (farm) in much the same way as nearby Hoxton was named after the farm of "Hoch". The first written record available is from 1294 when the name was written as Derleston.

The village was one of four small villages within the parish of Hackney (along with Newington, Shacklewell, and Kingsland) that were grouped for assessment purposes, together having only as many houses as the village of Hackney.

John Rocque's map of 1746 shows the village of Kingsland centred on the crossroads at what is now Dalston Junction and the small village of Dalston further east along Dalston Lane. Another clear feature is Roman Ermine Street which now forms most of the western boundary of this area. Ermine Street now has the road number A10 and goes by a number of names, including Kingsland Road as it travels through London.

Around 1280 CE a leper hospital was founded in Dalston by the citizens of London and in 1549 it was attached to the chapel of St Bartholomew as an outhouse.

During the 18th and 19th centuries the area changed from an agricultural and rural landscape to an urban one. By 1849, it was described as "a recently increased suburban village, with some handsome old houses", and by 1859 the village had exceeded its neighbour and, with the railways and continuous building, the village of Kingsland disappeared.

During the 1930s, 1940s and 1960s the area's large Jewish and other minority populations made it a target for provocative rallies by Oswald Mosley and the various organisations he founded. These were actively opposed by many local people, together with organisations such as the 43 Group in the 1940s and the 62 Group from 1962, and this led to a number of violent confrontations, notably in the Ridley Road and Hertford Road areas. A 2014 novel, Ridley Road, and its BBC One TV adaptation uses the clashes as a backdrop to the narrative.

In July 2017 a riot broke out on Dalston Road, which had originally started as a demonstration against police violence. Protesters barricaded the spot where a man, who later died at the Royal London Hospital, had been arrested. The rioters threw fire bombs at police and caused property damage.

=== Administrative history ===
The ancient parish of Hackney, of which Dalston was a part, detached from Stepney in the Middle Ages and had consistent boundaries from that time on.

The area was part of the historic (or ancient) county of Middlesex, but military and most (or all) civil county functions were managed more locally, by the Tower Division (also known as the Tower Hamlets), a historic 'county within a county', under the leadership of the Lord-Lieutenant of the Tower Hamlets (the post was always filled by the Constable of the Tower of London. The military loyalty to the Tower meant local men served in the Tower garrison and Tower Hamlets Militia, rather than the Middlesex Militia. This arrangement lasted until 1900.

In 1900, the Metropolitan Borough of Hackney was formed, using the boundaries of the former parish, and it became part of the County of London. In 1965 Hackney merged with the boroughs of Shoreditch and Stoke Newington to form the modern London Borough of Hackney, part of a new larger county of Greater London.

== Notable buildings ==
St. Mark's is a large Victorian church primarily built in the period 1864–66 to a design by Chester Cheston. It is reputedly the largest parish church in London, larger than Southwark Cathedral, capable of hosting congregations of 1800–2000 people and its great size has earned it the nickname, the "cathedral of the East End". The residential area around the church is also of high architectural quality and has accordingly been designated the "St. Mark's Conservation Area".

The Rio Cinema is a grade II listed independent Art Deco cinema. It is a popular single-screen cinema located on Kingsland High Street, with a history stretching back over 100 years.

The German Hospital, locally known as 'The German', is a group of attractive Victorian red brick buildings that were home to a hospital from 1845 to 1987. The hospital was initially founded to cater primarily for London's then large German-speaking community. It eventually became an ordinary NHS facility before its facilities were merged and moved to Homerton University Hospital.

== Culture ==
Dalston is known for music, events and its nightlife. Its biggest festival to date began in 2015, Dalston Music Festival. Centred on Gillett Square and 8 clubs in the surrounding area, it was founded by Andrew Bunsell of Dalston Studios.

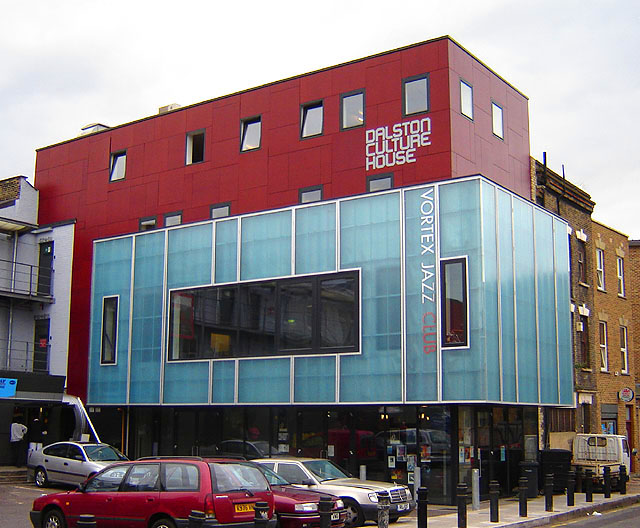
The Dalston Culture House now houses the Vortex Jazz Club. (October 2005)

Dalston hosts several art and entertainment venues, and has a history as an entertainment centre, with at one time hosting four or five cinemas within a radius of 1/3 mile (500 m), and the Dalston Theatre, a former hippodrome and music hall that later became the Four Aces blues club and the Labyrinth nightclub. The Dalston Theatre was demolished in February 2007, despite an active local campaign to save it. Dalston was also a hub for 1970s and 1980s pub rock venues but these are largely defunct.

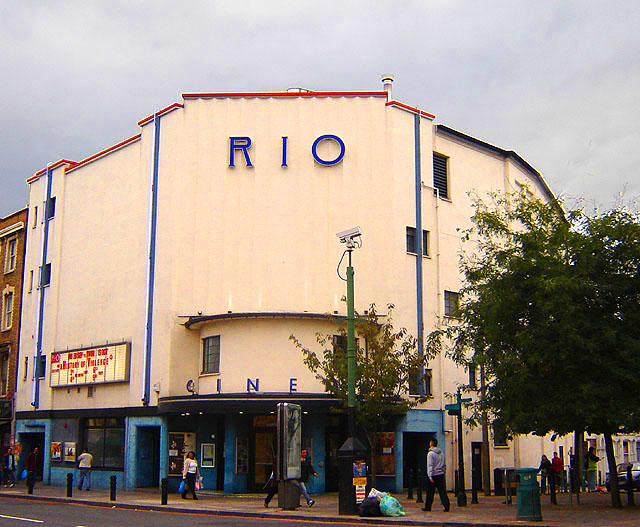
The Dalston Rio Cinema

Fassett Square was the inspiration for the BBC soap EastEnders. Originally, there were plans to film the series there, on location. However, Fassett Square (Albert Square) and Ridley Road Market (Walford Market) were rebuilt on the set in Elstree, near Borehamwood, to have a more controlled filming environment. The idea of Walford stems from Walford Road, and many of the houses on the show use the same exterior design. Coincidentally both Barbara Windsor and Tony Holland, one of the original creators of the show, lived at different times on the street.

The Hackney Peace Carnival Mural depicts a group of people marching for peace against "the bomb". It was designed in 1985 by Ray Walker and has become an important cultural statement from that era. It can be found opposite Dalston Junction Overground station on Dalston Lane. It has also been used on the cover of the Home album by local group Rudimental.

Music hall artist Marie Lloyd (1870–1922) used to reside on Graham Road. The house now has a blue plaque.

== Shopping ==
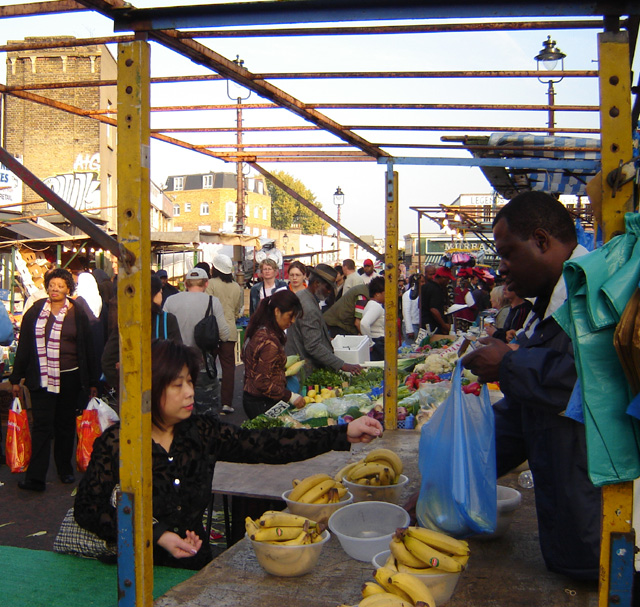
Dalston's Ridley Road market, October 2005

Established in the 1880s, Ridley Road Market is opposite Dalston Kingsland railway station. Fruit and vegetables, some fairly exotic, are available. Halal butchers cluster around the high street end of the market.

Ridley Road market is reputedly the basis for the one found in the BBC's EastEnders. The Kingsland Shopping Centre (formerly Dalston Cross) is just south of Ridley Road Market. Kingsland Road and the surrounding streets are home to boutiques, bars and cafés.

== Demographics ==
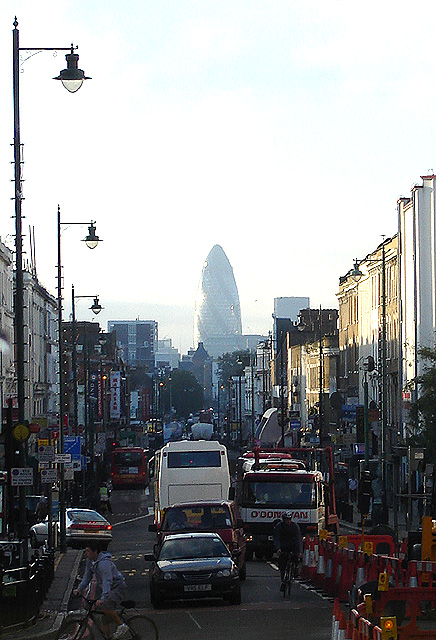
Dalston, looking south towards the City. A major traffic nexus. (October 2005)

Contemporary Dalston is a lively neighbourhood with an ethnically varied population. Architecturally it is a mixture of 18th- and 19th-century terraced houses and 20th-century council estates. It is currently undergoing rapid gentrification, partly because of the redevelopment of Dalston Junction railway station and partly due to the revitalisation of large parts of east London in the build-up to the 2012 Olympics. (Hackney was one of the four host boroughs of the games.)

Dalston has attracted immigrants for over 100 years; at the turn of the century it was a popular area for newly arrived Jewish people from central Europe. In the 1950s and '60s, as the Jewish community became more affluent and moved out, they were replaced by a large Caribbean community, which accounts for the wide choice of Caribbean food available in Ridley Road. As the Caribbean community slowly drifted out of Dalston it then became popular with the Turkish, as well as the Vietnamese.

In April 2009 The Guardian published an article on Dalston claiming that it was the "coolest" place to live in Britain. In the same year however, sculpture park The Towers of Hackney was torn down to give way to new buildings.

== Transport ==
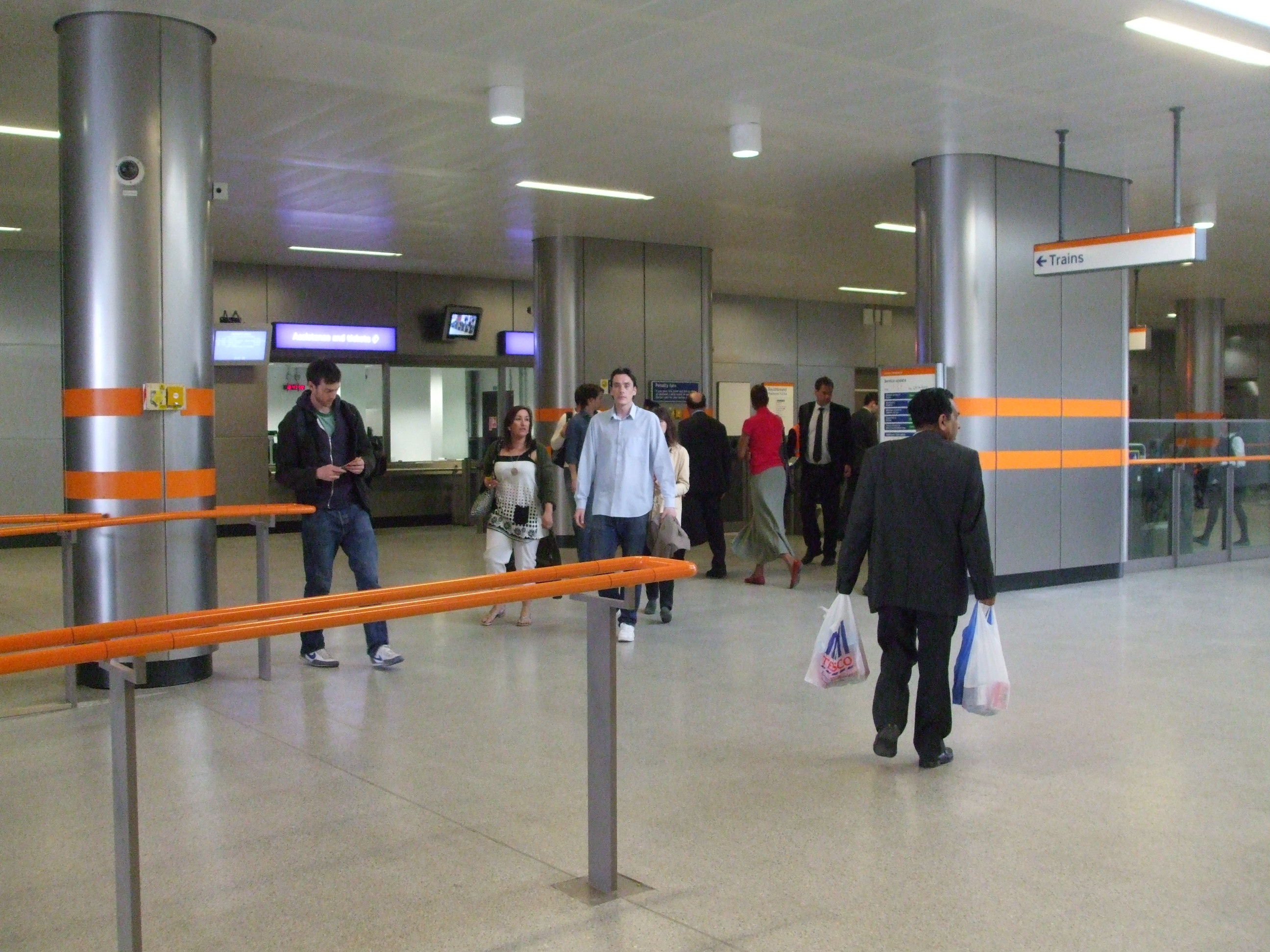
Dalston Junction concourse

=== Rail ===
Dalston is on the London Overground network, served by three stations:

- Dalston Kingsland – for Mildmay line services between Stratford and Richmond or Clapham Junction. This provides Dalston with a direct rail link to Hackney Central, Highbury & Islington, Camden Road, Willesden Junction and destinations in West London.
- Dalston Junction – for Windrush line services between Highbury & Islington and either West Croydon, Crystal Palace, New Cross or Clapham Junction. This gives the area a direct rail connection to Shoreditch, Whitechapel, Canada Water and destinations in South London.
- Haggerston – partly in the district, served by the Windrush line trains between Highbury & Islington and West Croydon, Crystal Palace, New Cross or Clapham Junction.

All stations are in London fare zone 2, and Oyster cards are valid for travel from Dalston to other destinations in London. Dalston Junction is the busiest station of the three, with 5.677 million passenger entries and exits at the station in 2017–2018.

There is no direct rail link to Central London, and Dalston is not on the London Underground network. Direct connections to London's zone 1 can be found at Hackney Central and Highbury & Islington stations. A new station in Dalston has been proposed as part of the Crossrail 2 development.

=== Buses ===
Dalston is served by London Buses on routes 30, 38, 56, 67, 76, 149, 236, 242, 243, 277, 488 and N38. Routes 76, 149, 242, 243 and 277 run 24-hours, daily.

Dalston Bus Garage on Shrubland Road has been demolished.

=== Road ===
Major roads in Dalston include:

- A10 (Kingsland Road/Kingsland High Street) – southbound to Shoreditch and the City of London, northbound to Tottenham, Enfield and Hertford.
- A104 (Balls Pond Road/Dalston Lane) – westbound towards Green Lanes, Highbury and Angel, eastbound to Hackney Downs, Clapton, Leyton and Epping Forest.
- A1207 (Graham Road) – eastbound to Hackney.
- B102 (Southgate Road) – southbound to De Beauvoir Town and Hoxton.
- B108 (Queensbridge Road) – southbound to Haggerston.

==== Air pollution ====
The London Borough of Hackney measures roadside air quality in Dalston, in particular the concentration of Nitrogen Dioxide (NO_{2}) in the district. Diffusion tubes which measure the concentration of NO_{2} in roadside air show that across Dalston, the local roadside air quality failed to meet the UK National Objective of 40μg/m^{3} (micrograms per cubic metre) in 2017.

In 2017, the average roadside NO_{2} levels in several key locations in Dalston were:

- Dalston Lane (A104) – 63 μg/m^{3}
- Kingsland High Street (A10) – 62 μg/m^{3}
- Kingsland Road (A10) – 52 μg/m^{3}
- Dalston Library – 39 μg/m^{3} (which meets the UK National Air Quality objective)

=== Cycling ===
Cycling infrastructure is maintained and managed in Dalston by the London Borough of Hackney and Transport for London (TfL).

Several key routes pass through the district, including:

- Cycle Superhighway 1 (CS1) – an unbroken, signposted route running on residential streets, north–south through Dalston. Northbound, the route carries cyclists to Stoke Newington, Seven Sisters and Tottenham. Southbound, the route passes through De Beauvior Town and Hoxton en route to Moorgate in the City.
- Quietway 2 (Q2) – an unbroken, signposted route running on quieter streets or shared-use paths, east–west through Dalston. Westbound, the route runs to Bloomsbury via Canonbury, Angel and Finsbury. Eastbound, Q2 runs to Walthamstow via London Fields and Clapton.

Also nearby, there is a signed cycle route through Shacklewell from Hackney Downs to the east, to Clissold Park and Finsbury Park to the northwest. The Regent's Canal towpath passes through neighbouring Haggerston, which runs unbroken from Limehouse to Angel, via Mile End.

== Cultural references ==
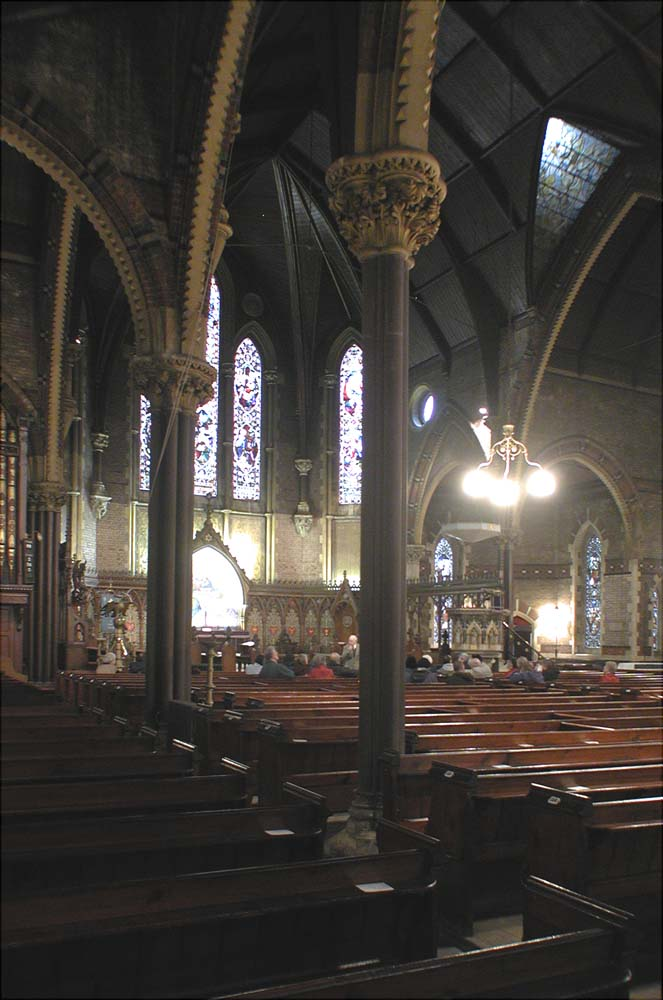
Interior of St. Mark's Church in Dalston, featured in 2007 film Run Fat Boy Run.

- The 2007 film Run Fat Boy Run (directed by David Schwimmer) was filmed in Dalston (St. Mark's conservation area). Dennis (Simon Pegg) stays in a flat on Sandringham Road across the road from St. Mark's Church.
- The second and third series of popular television show The Mighty Boosh takes place in Dalston.
- The 2021 film Boiling Point (2021 film) was filmed in Dalston at restaurant, Jones & Sons. Dalston bar Dalston Superstore is mentioned multiple times in the film.
- Dalston Songs is a staged song cycle with seven singers created and composed by Helen Chadwick and choreographed by Steven Hoggett. It was based on interviews with people in East London about home and was performed in 2008 at the Royal Opera House.
- Dalston is the second of 12 placenames associated with London mentioned in an overdubbed choral series on the Lily Allen song "LDN": "Angel, Dalston, Stockwell, Clapton, Soho, Ladbroke Grove...".
- Britney Spears recorded the pop video for the song Criminal in Dalston in September 2011.
- Rio Cinema, Dalston features in the film One Day (2011 film).
- British indie rock band Razorlight recorded a song called "Don't go back to Dalston", featured on their debut album Up All Night.
- Connan Mockasin's song "Forever Dolphin Love" mentions Dalston.
- Dalston was featured in an episode of the 1990s Channel 4 comedy series Drop the Dead Donkey, in which the reconstruction of a fictitious post office robbery is staged, in a Crimewatch parody.
- The poet Martina Evans lives in Dalston and has referenced it in some of her poems.

== Notable people ==
- Daisy Radcliffe Beresford, British painter and decorative artist, was born in Dalston
- Tony Blair, Labour politician and former prime minister, lived at 59 Mapledene Road 1980–86
- Martina Evans, poet, lives in Balls Pond Road and has referenced Dalston in some of her poems.
- Stephen Fry and Hugh Laurie, performers, shared a house on St Mark's Rise in Dalston in the early 1980s
- Sam Lee, folk musician and ethnomusicologist
- Emily Lloyd, actress
- Diane Morgan, interviewer from Bolton
- Charles James Martin, director of the Lister Institute of Preventive Medicine
- Alan Spenner, bass player with the Grease Band and Roxy Music
- Edith Thompson, hanged for murder, was born here
- Rachel Whiteread, Turner Prize-winning artist
