= Ash Grove bus garage =

Bus garage in Hackney, East London

Coordinates: 51°32′9″N 0°3′32″W

- Interactive map of Ash Grove bus garage

Location
- Location: Mare Street, Hackney Central

Characteristics
- Operator: Stagecoach London

History
- Opened: 25 April 1981; 45 years ago

Ash Grove bus garage is a bus garage in Hackney, East London (hence the HK code) owned by London Buses. It is located on Ash Grove, off Mare Street, north of the Regent's Canal and is occupied by Stagecoach London. The garage was opened in April 1981 by London Transport and has been leased to a number of bus operators over the years.

== History ==
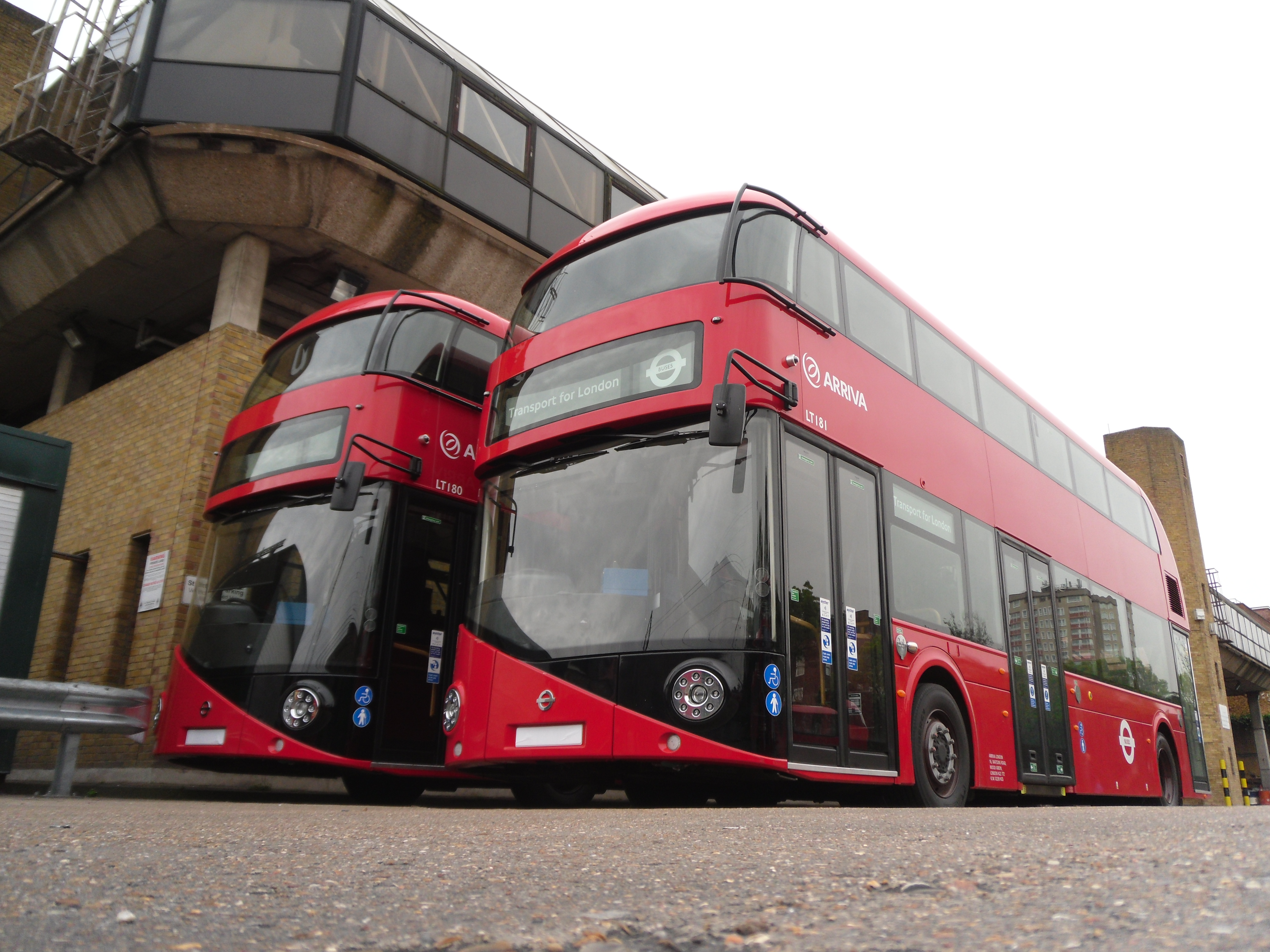
Arriva London New Routemasters at Ash Grove bus garage

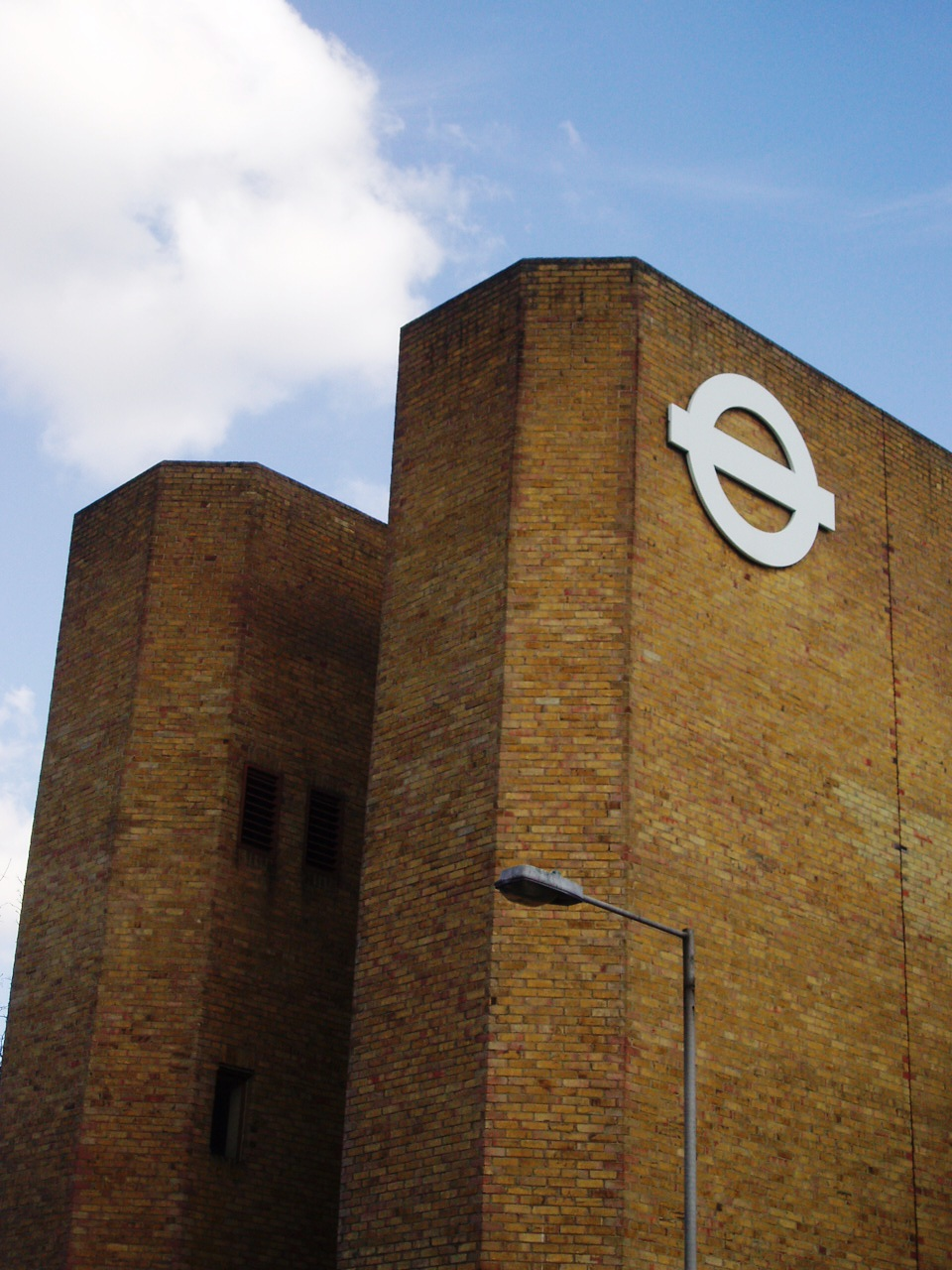
Ash Grove bus garage roundel

Ash Grove is one of three new garages opened in 1981 by London Transport at a cost of £3.5 million. It had space for 140 buses undercover and a further 30 in the yard. The roof was unusual in being carried by ten 35-ton triangular trusses supported on reinforced concrete columns. The garage assumed Hackney's operation of Red Arrow routes 502 and 513 using new Leyland Nationals, and replaced two garages in Hackney and Dalston that had opened in 1889 and 1906 respectively.

When London Buses was split into eleven separate companies Ash Grove became part of the London Forest operation, but closed in 1991 when London Forest was wound up.

=== 1990s ===
The garage was re-opened in 1994 by Kentish Bus, who had gained a small number of routes in the Leyton area, including former Boro'line route 108. Kentish referred to the garage as Cambridge Heath.

At various times, Ash Grove was used to store vehicles for the London Transport Museum.

=== 2000s ===
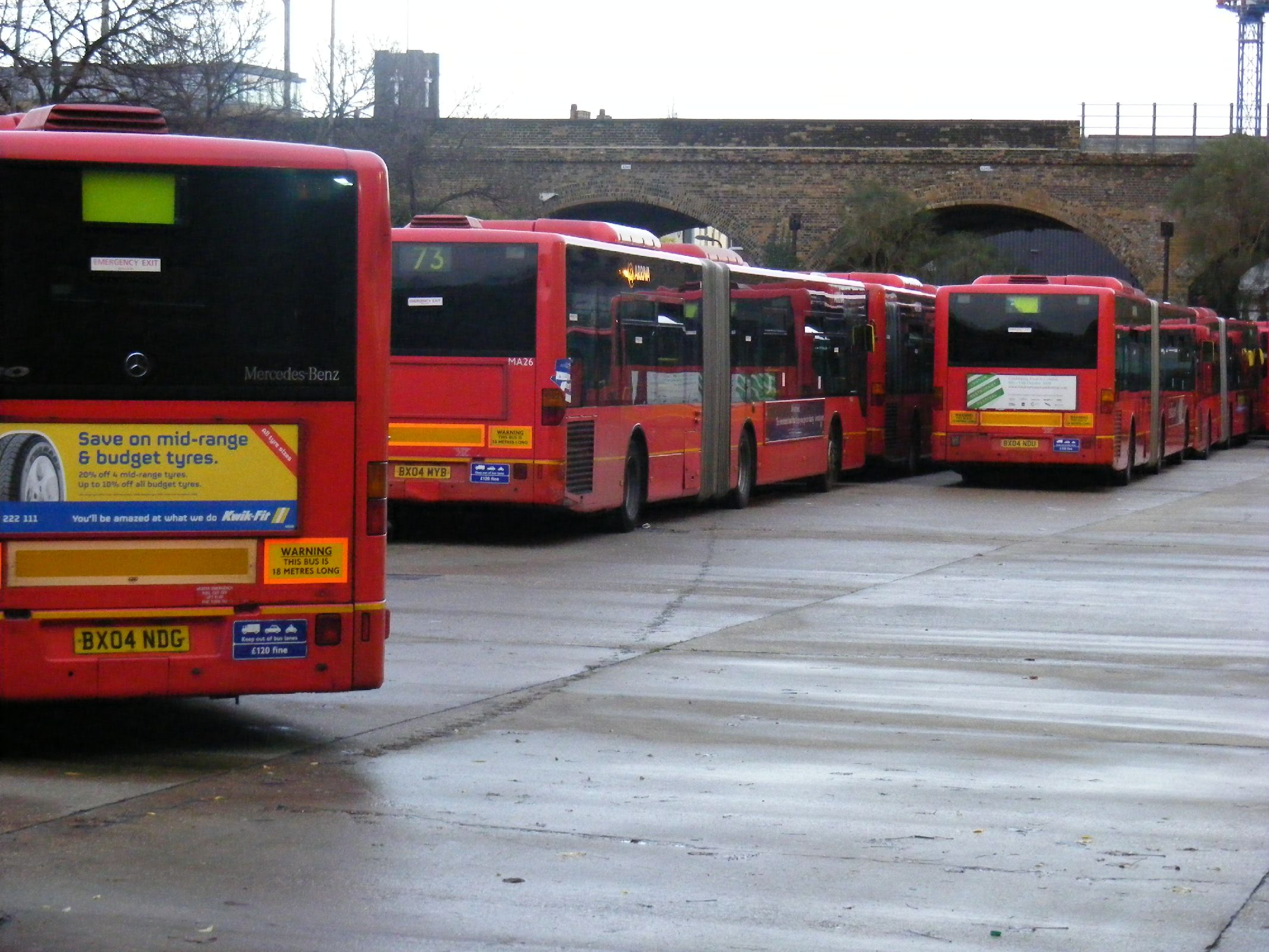
Arriva London Mercedes-Benz Citaros at Ash Grove

Ash Grove re-opened again in 2000 for use by the London Buses company East Thames Buses which took over the former Harris Bus routes after that company ran into financial difficulties. East Thames Buses later moved to new premises at Mandela Way. CT Plus used the garage yard to house its routes won in the London area.

Arriva London used the depot as the base for their new Mercedes-Benz Citaro articulated buses for route 38 following the conversion from AEC Routemasters in November 2005. This has ended following the route's conversion back to double-deck operation, but routes 78 and 168 have been transferred to operate from the garage.

In 2022, CT Plus's part of Ash Grove depot was sold to Stagecoach London as part of CT Plus selling their London operations.

== Industrial relations ==
The garage has suffered from a number of industrial relations difficulties in its history. In 1991, London Forest won a group of eleven tendered routes in the Walthamstow area on the basis of very low prices. This led to the company proposing a pay cut of around 18% to all staff, which saw staff at all of its four garages strike. Following these events the company was wound up and the garage closed.

In June 2008, forty CT Plus employees based at the garage protested against the dismissal of a shop steward who had refused to drive a bus with a health and safety defect. October 2010 saw strike action by CT Plus workers in a dispute over pay, although most services were not disrupted significantly.
