= London Buses route 242 =

London bus route

242
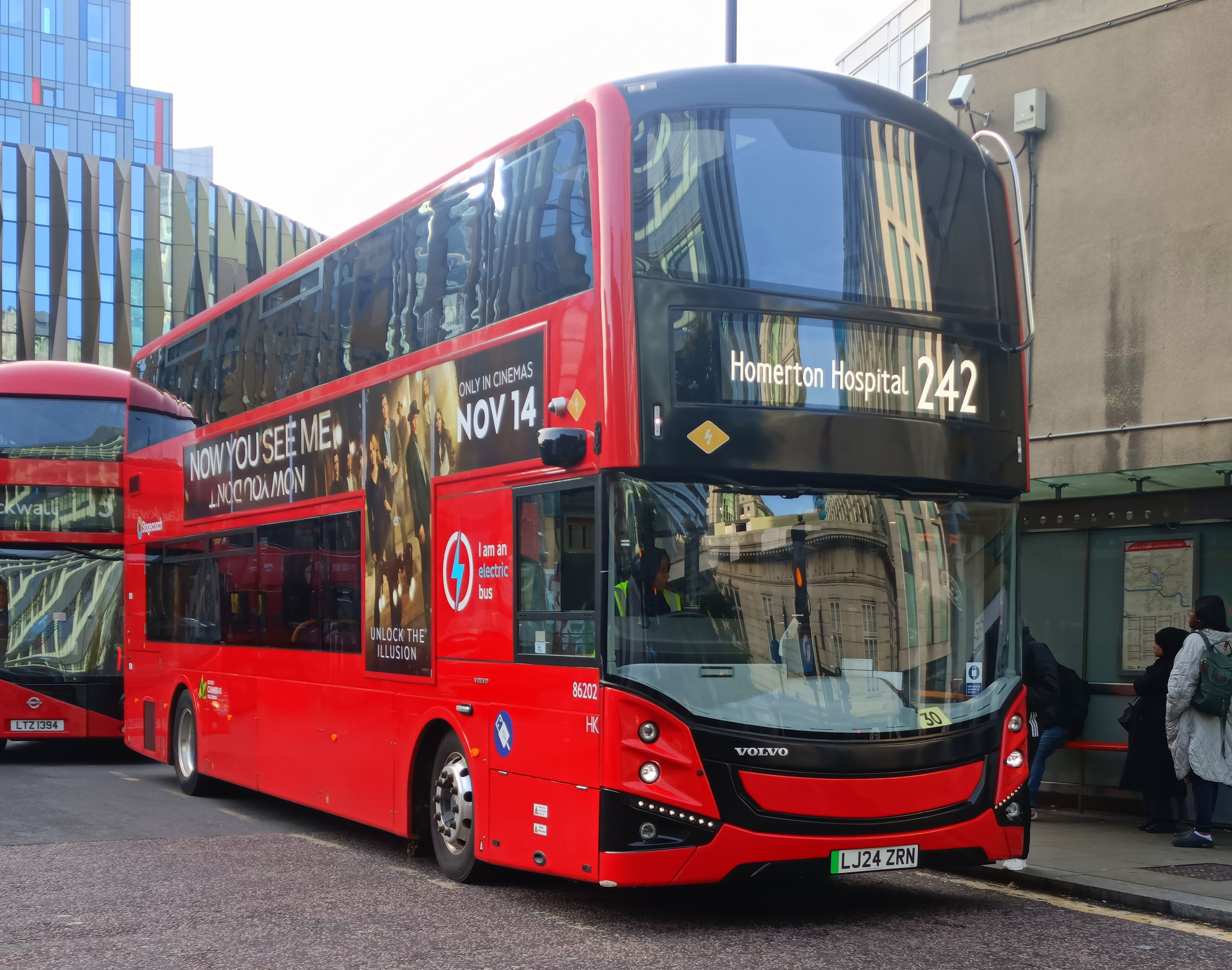
- East London MCV D113 EV bodied Volvo BZL at Aldgate bus station in October 2025

Overview
- Operator: East London (Stagecoach London)
- Garage: Ash Grove
- Vehicle: Wright StreetDeck Electroliner
- Peak vehicle requirement: 14
- Began service: 28 February 1998
- Predecessors: Route 22A; Route 22B
- Night-time: N242

Route
- Start: Aldgate bus station
- Via: Shoreditch; Dalston; Hackney Central
- End: Homerton University Hospital
- Length: 6 miles (9.7 km)

Service
- Level: Daily
- Frequency: About every 10-12 minutes
- Journey time: 32-65 minutes
- Operates: 05:00 until 01:27

London Buses route 242 is a Transport for London contracted bus route in London, England. Running between Aldgate bus station and Homerton University Hospital, it is operated by Stagecoach London subsidiary East London.

In December 1998, it became the first double-decker route in London to solely use low-floor buses. The route re-uses the number of the historic route 242 that ran between Chingford station and Potters Bar via Waltham Abbey and Cheshunt.

== History ==
=== Original route ===
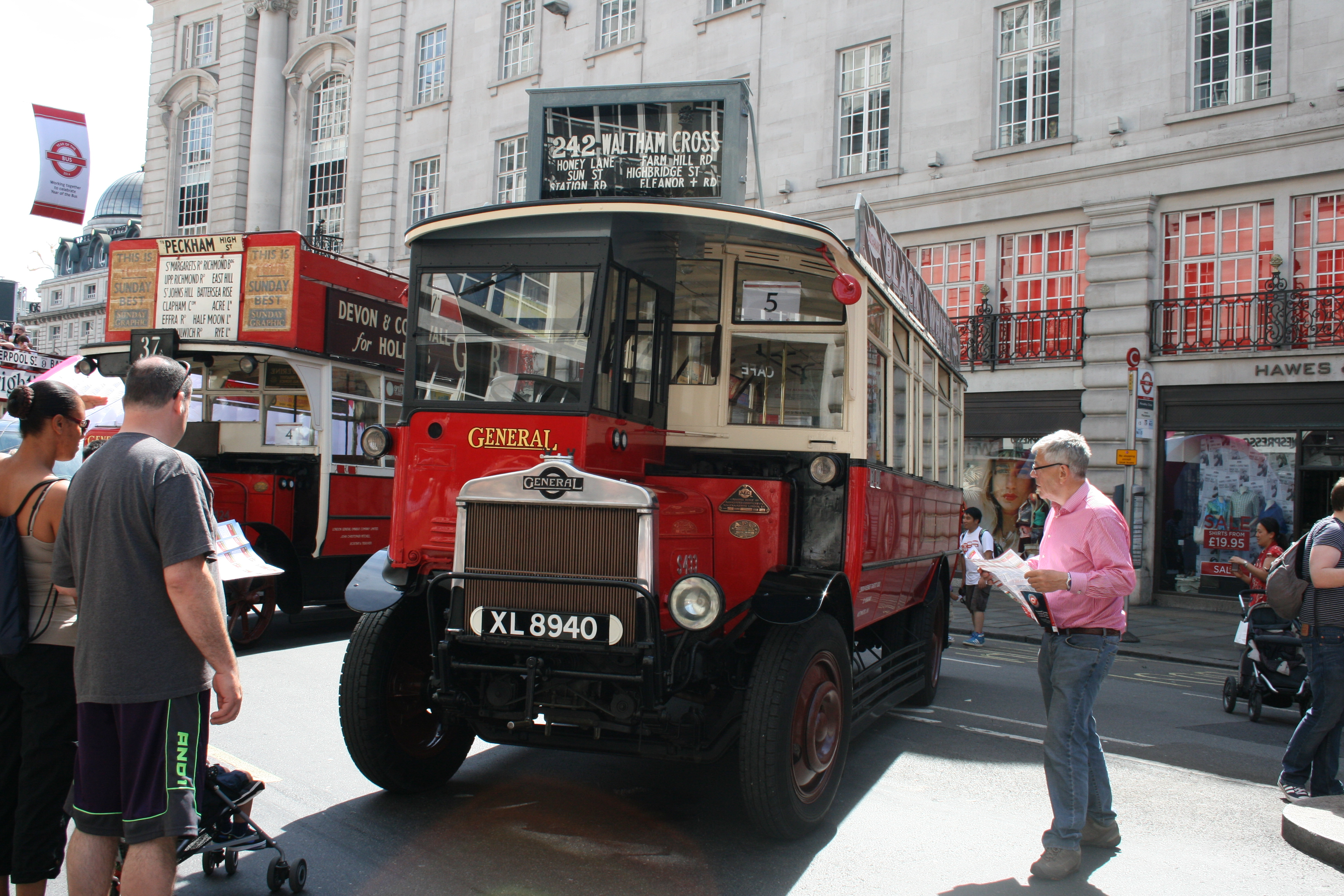
Early 242 bus on display (AEC S-Type) at the Regent Street Bus Cavalcade in 2014, with the original 1934 route via Waltham Abbey on destination blind

The original London bus route 242 was launched in October 1934 between Waltham Cross and Epping Forest (The Volunteer or Wake Arms, depending on day/season) via Waltham Abbey. Prior to 1934, the number 306 was used.

In 1940 the route was extended to Cheshunt, and then to Potters Bar via Cuffley and Goffs Oak in 1941.

Between 1958 and 1968, variant London bus route 242A also ran between Upshire and Potters Bar.

From the 1960s onwards, the main route 242 ran between Chingford Station and Potters Bar via Waltham Abbey, Waltham Cross, Cheshunt, Goffs Oak and Cuffley.

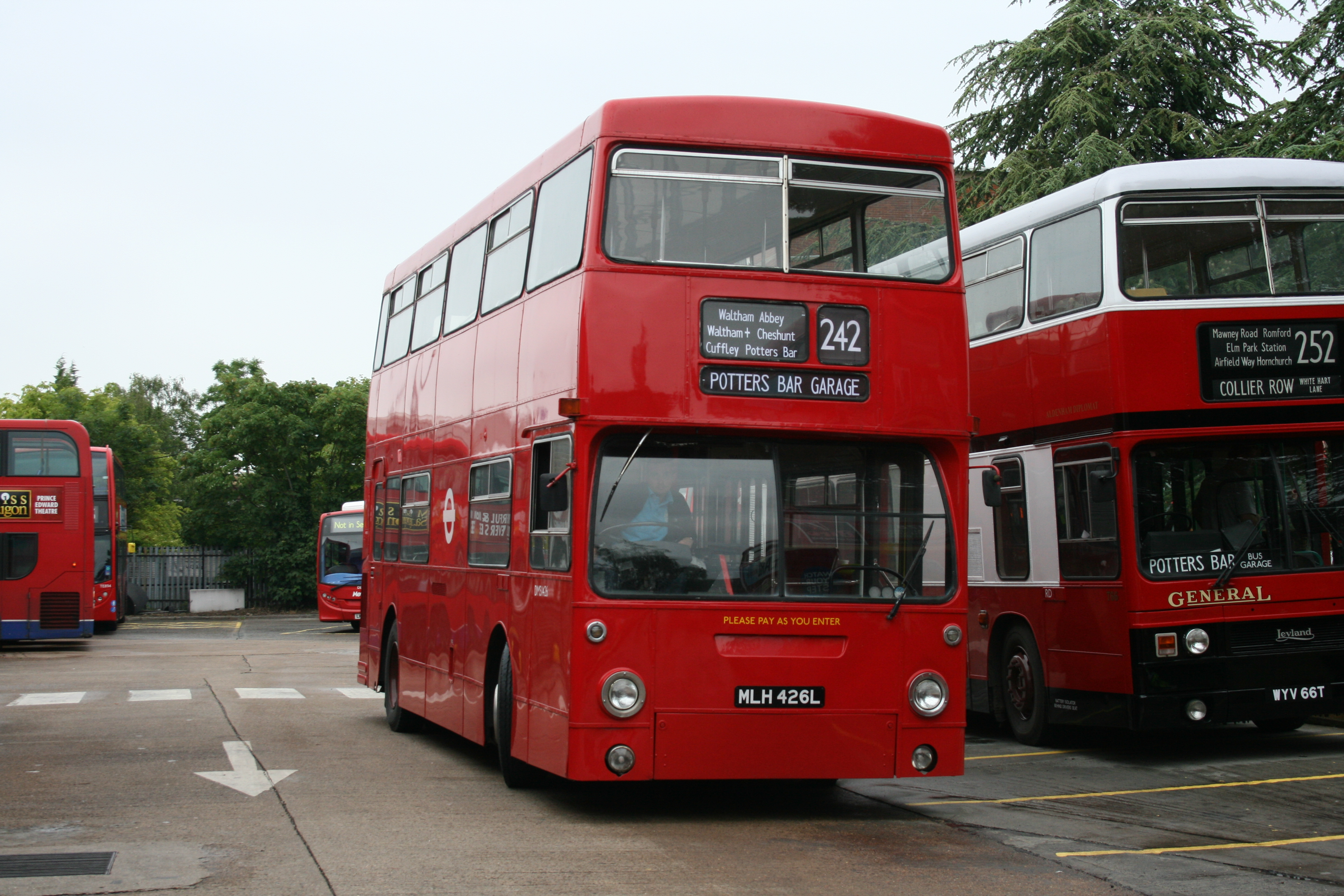
Preserved 1970s double decker with Chingford-Potters Bar 242 destination blind at Potters Bar garage

In the 1990s, route 242 was handed to Metroline as a commercial operation, thereby removing it from the Transport for London network. The section between Waltham Cross and Chingford via Waltham Abbey was also withdrawn.

Today, the original route 242 is operated commercially as a non-TfL route between Waltham Cross and Potters Bar by Uno Bus and Central Connect, with a reduced service.

=== Present route ===
Route 242 was introduced in February 1998 between Homerton University Hospital and Tottenham Court Road station, replacing routes 22A and 22B.

In December 1998, the introduction of Alexander ALX400 bodied DAF DB250 buses on the route made it the first double-decker route in London to solely use accessible, low-floor buses.

In 2004 it became a 24-hour service with night bus route N242 services that followed the same route renumbered 242. The route of the bus was criticised by London Assembly members for its use of narrow streets.

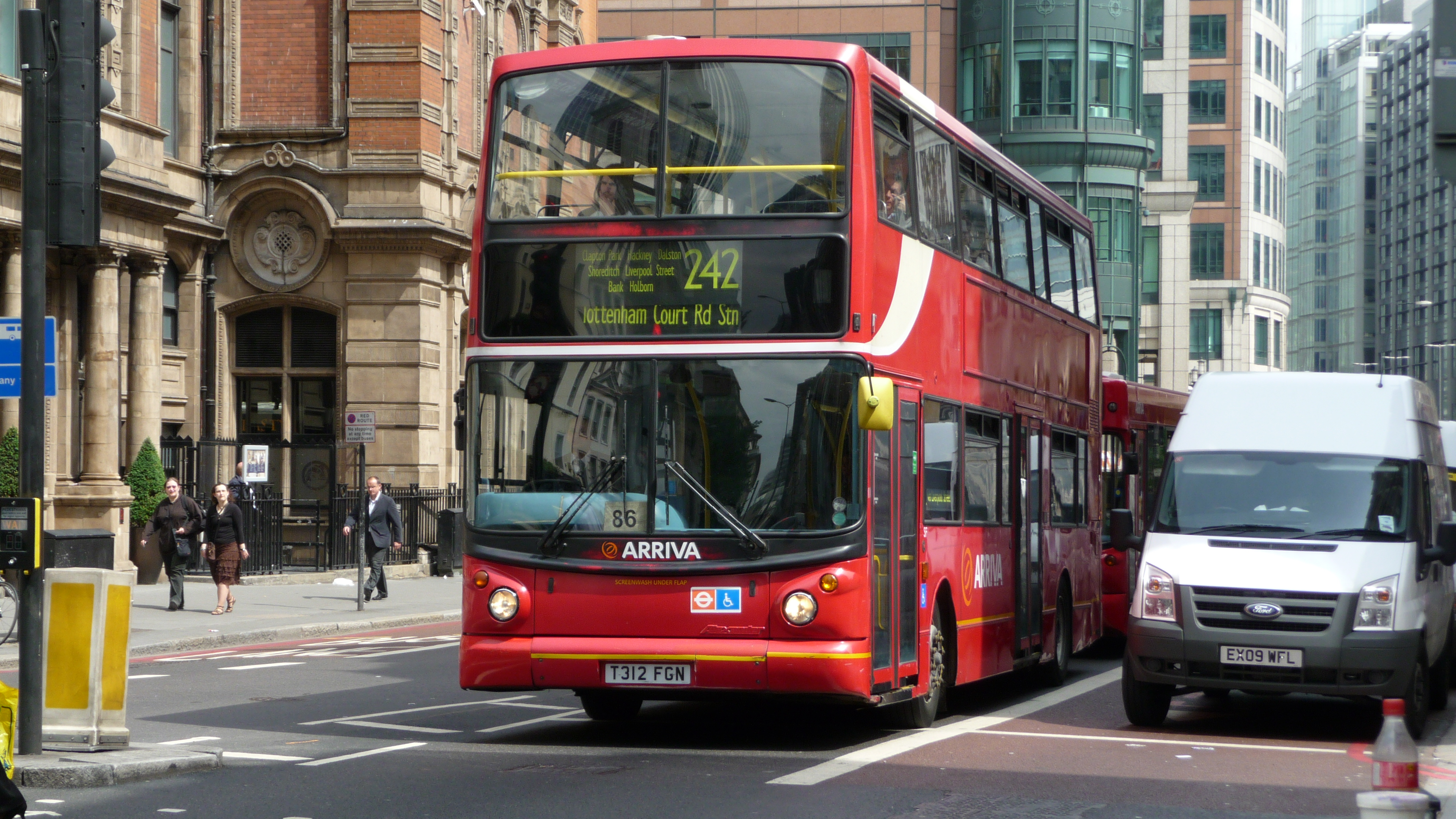
Alexander ALX400 bodied DAF DB250 in 2009

In 2017, the route was diverted to terminate at St Paul's, before being cut back on 15 June 2019 to Aldgate bus station with a service frequency reduction. The diversion to Aldgate was criticised for the reduction in access to the City of London and St Bartholomew's Hospital for residents. The reduction in service frequency was criticised for its impacts on the deprived Clapton Park Estate, an area only served by the route.

The night route continues to serve Tottenham Court Road station, and from 15 June 2019 was renumbered route N242.

Upon being re-tendered in 2002, 2009 and 2016, the route was retained by Arriva London.

== Current route ==
Route 242 operates via these primary locations:

- Aldgate bus station
- Aldgate East station
- Shoreditch High Street station
- Hoxton station
- Haggerston station
- Dalston Junction station
- Hackney Central station
- Clapton Square
- Homerton University Hospital
