= London Buses route 253 =

London bus route

253
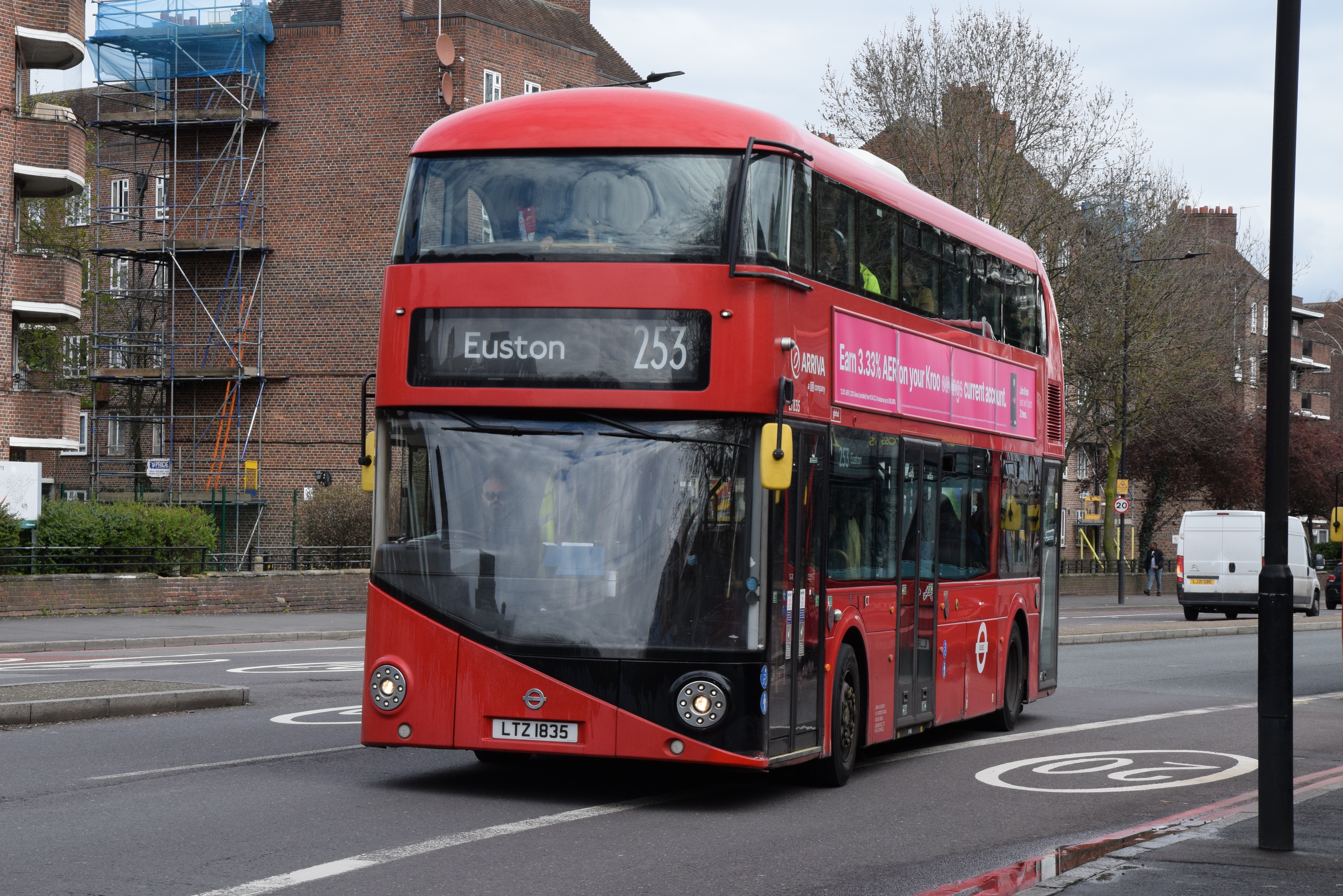
- Arriva London New Routemaster at Manor House station in April 2023

Overview
- Operator: Arriva London
- Garage: Clapton
- Vehicle: New Routemaster
- Night-time: N253

Route
- Start: Euston bus station
- Via: Camden Town; Holloway; Finsbury Park; Stamford Hill; Clapton Pond
- End: Hackney Central station

London Buses route 253 is a Transport for London contracted bus route in London, England. Running between Euston bus station and Hackney Central station, it is operated by Arriva London.

== History ==
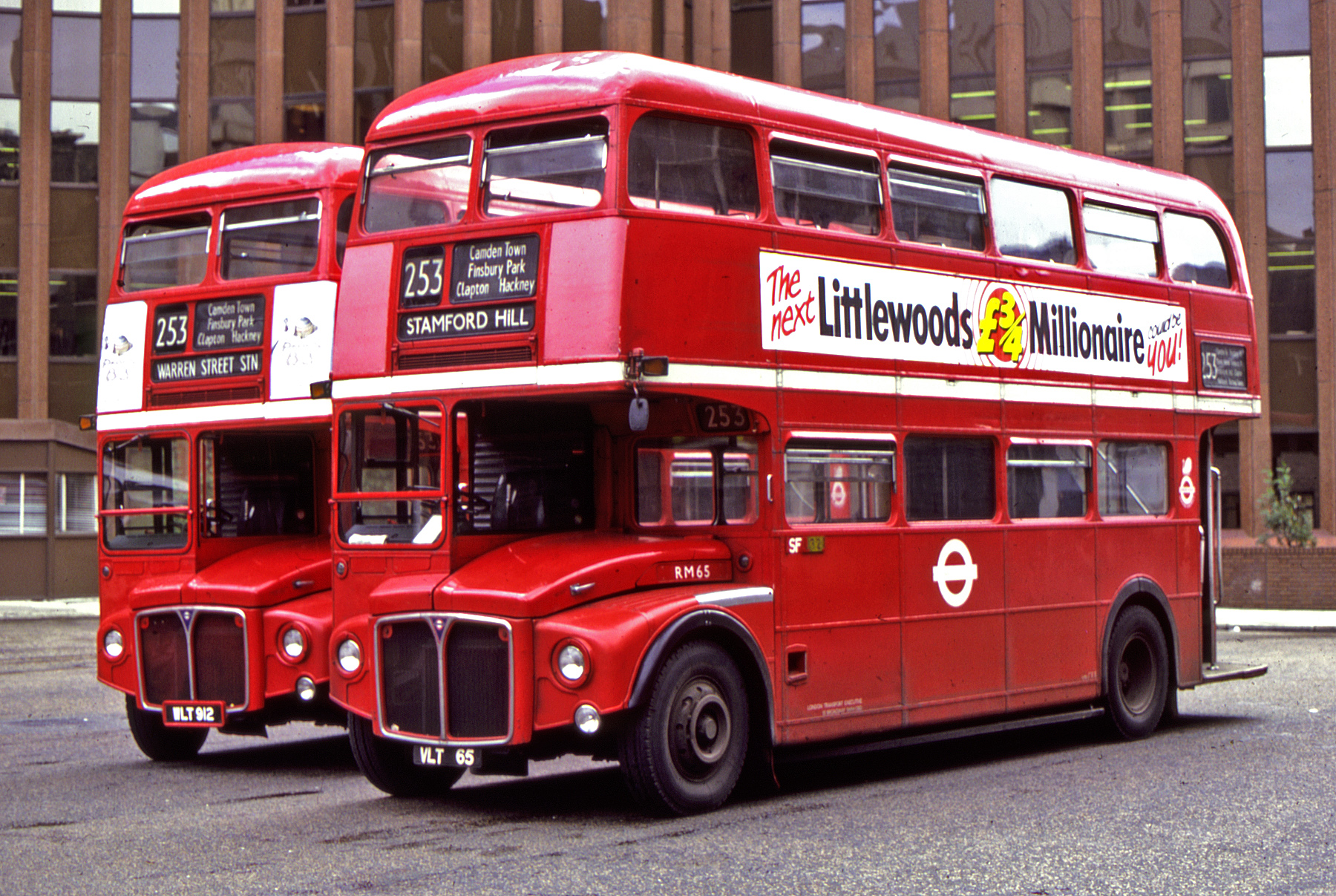
AEC Routemasters at Aldgate bus station in September 1983

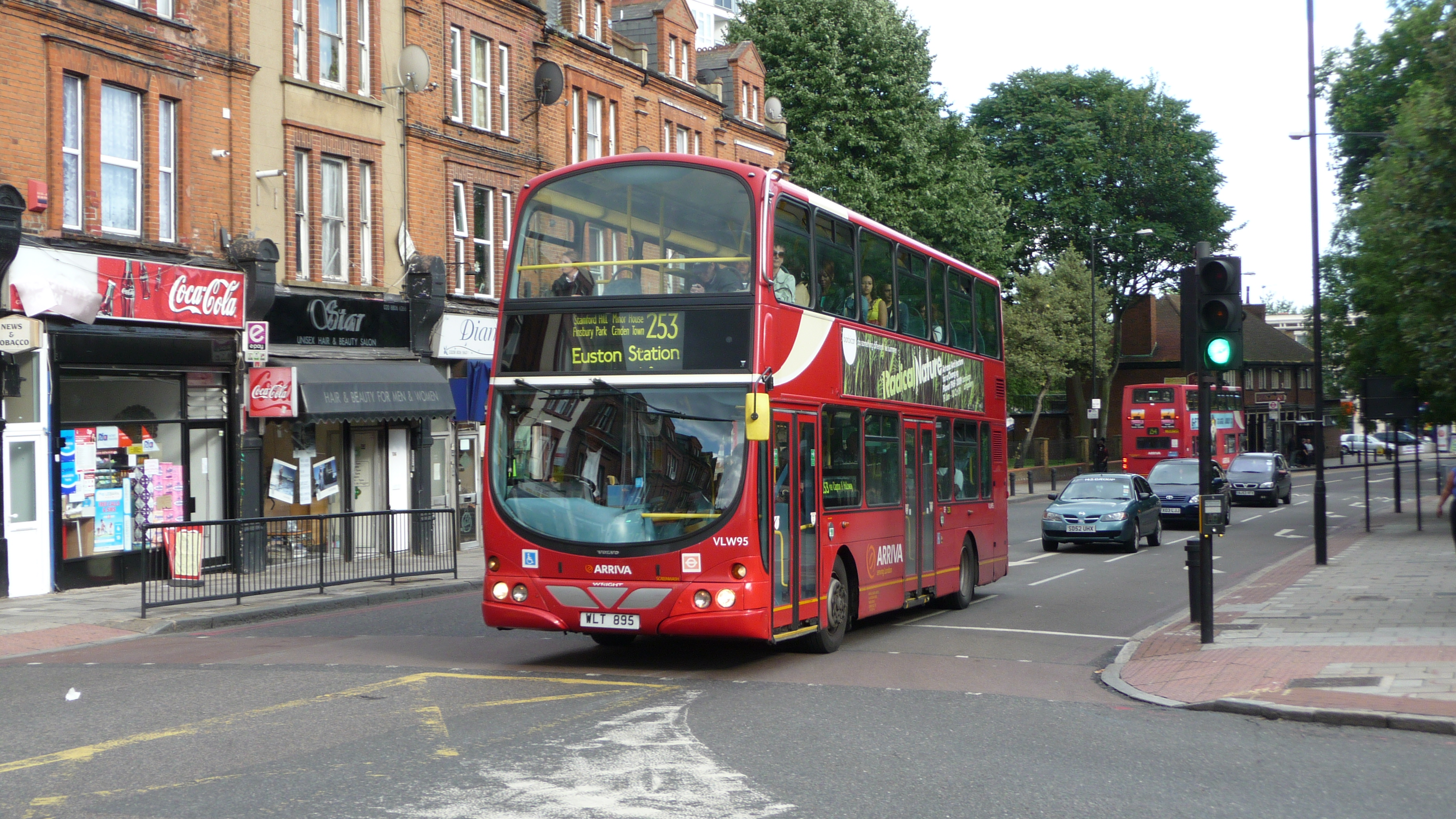
Arriva London Wright Eclipse Gemini bodied Volvo B7TL in Upper Clapton in July 2009

Route 253 commenced operating on 1 February 1961 between Aldgate bus station and Tottenham Court Road via Bethnal Green, Hackney Central, Clapton Pond, Stamford Hill, Manor House, Finsbury Park and Camden Town as a replacement for trolleybus route 653 with AEC Routemasters.

By 1994 the route, now operated by Leaside Buses, was one of the busiest in London, with a peak vehicle requirement of 50 buses operating at a frequency of one bus every two minutes.

The route now runs between Hackney Central and Euston (via Clapton Pond, Stamford Hill, Manor House, Finsbury Park and Camden Town). The original route is still served in its entirety by night bus N253, while the section of the original route between Hackney Central and Aldgate bus station is now served by the 254.

In November 2009, route 253 was retained by incumbent operator Arriva London. Upon being re-tendered, the route was retained by Arriva London with a new contract commencing on 6 June 2015.

From October 2016, Arriva London began introducing a fleet of 32 New Routemasters to be on the route. The rollout of new vehicles was completed in December 2016.

== Current route ==
Route 253 operates via these primary locations:

- Euston bus station
- Mornington Crescent station
- Camden Town station
- Camden Road station
- HM Prison Holloway
- Caledonian Road
- Holloway Nag's Head
- Finsbury Park station
- Manor House station
- Stamford Hill station
- Cazenove Road
- Clapton station
- Clapton Pond Lea Bridge Roundabout
- Hackney Central station

== In popular culture ==
The 2001 Chris T-T album "The 253" is named after the route.

The 2009 Just Jack song "253", from the album All Night Cinema, is named after the route.
