= Hackney Central railway station =

London Overground station

Hackney Central
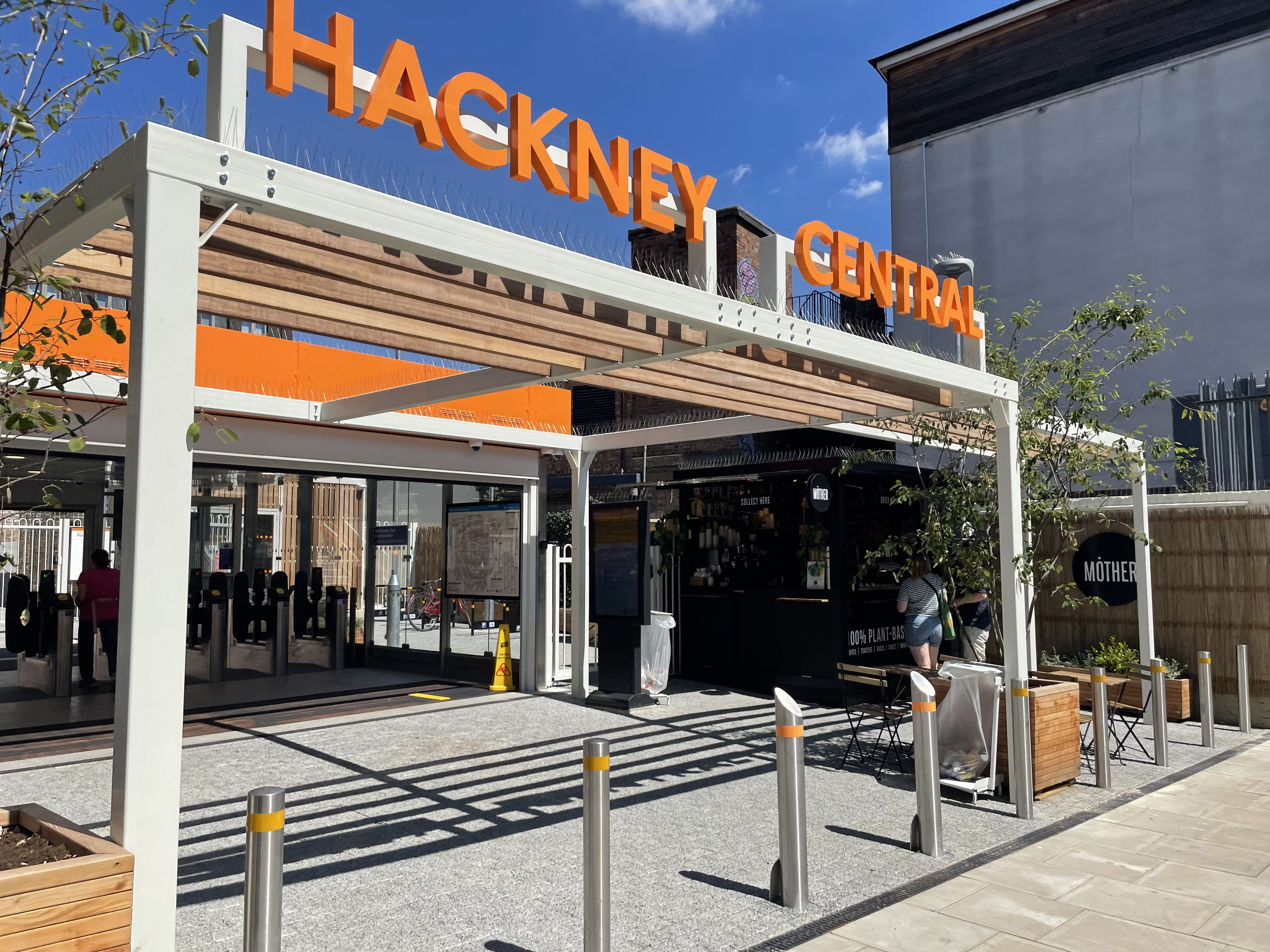
- Interactive map of Hackney Central

General information
- Location: Hackney
- Local authority: London Borough of Hackney
- Managed by: London Overground
- Owner: Network Rail
- Station code: HKC
- DfT category: D
- Number of platforms: 2
- Accessible: Yes
- Fare zone: 2
- OSI: Hackney Downs

National Rail annual entry and exit
- 2020–21: ▼1.110 million
- Interchange: ▼1.576 million
- 2021–22: ▲3.394 million
- Interchange: ▲1.496 million
- 2022–23: ▲4.206 million
- Interchange: ▼1.467 million
- 2023–24: ▲5.153 million
- Interchange: ▲2.109 million
- 2024–25: ▲5.317 million
- Interchange: ▼1.782 million

Key dates
- 26 September 1850: Opened as Hackney
- 1 December 1870: Relocated west
- 1944: Closed
- 12 May 1980: Reopened as Hackney Central

Other information
- External links: Departures; Facilities
- Coordinates: 51.547°N 0.0559°W

Hackney Central is a station on the Mildmay line of the London Overground, located in the London Borough of Hackney. It lies between Dalston Kingsland and Homerton in London fare zone 2. The station and the trains serving it are operated by Transport for London.

The station is connected to Hackney Downs station on the Weaver line of the Overground by a direct passenger walkway linking the two stations (replacing an earlier such link) that was opened in July 2015. This walkway means passengers do not have to exit on to the street in order to continue their onward journey and has eased congestion.

== History ==
=== Early years ===
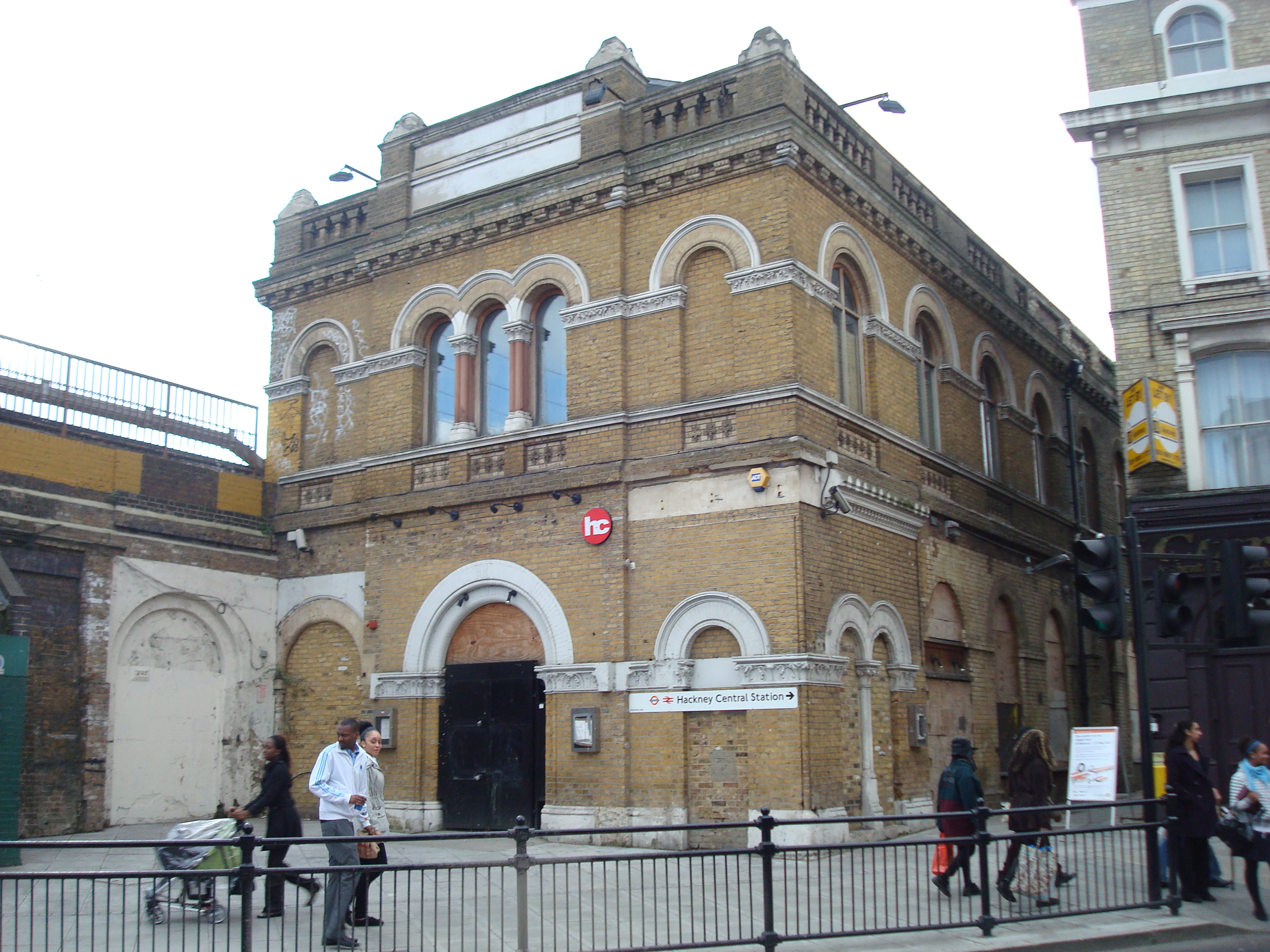
The original Edwin Henry Horne building

The North London Railway opened a station named Hackney on 26 September 1850, to the east of Mare Street, then in the county of Middlesex. It closed on 1 December 1870 and was replaced the same day by a station to the west of Mare Street, designed by Edwin Henry Horne and also named Hackney. This station passed in due course to the London and North Western Railway and later on to the London, Midland and Scottish Railway, which closed the entire North London line east of Dalston Junction to passenger traffic in 1944.

Just to the west of the station a goods yard called Graham Road was opened by the Great Eastern Railway in 1894. Located just west of the GER Hackney Downs railway viaduct the depot consisted of seven sidings dealing with coal and general goods. The land had originally been purchased for a rail link between the North London and Great Eastern Railways.

Graham Road goods yard closed in October 1965. The site was finally used to link the North London and Great Eastern lines when in anticipation of the closure of Broad Street railway station in 1985 the "Graham Road Curve" was opened to traffic.

=== Reopening ===
On 12 May 1980, the station was reopened by British Rail as part of the Crosstown Linkline service, this time named Hackney Central, a little to the west of the 1870 station. The 1870 station building designed by Edwin Henry Horne is no longer in use by the railway, but is one of only two examples of North London Railway architecture still in situ, the other being Camden Road station, which is still open. Access to the modern Hackney Central station is from an alleyway adjacent to the 1870 building on Mare Street, as well as a more direct access from Amhurst Road.

The former station building is now a bar and music venue.

=== Line improvement ===
As part of the programme to introduce four-car trains on the London Overground network, the North London line between Gospel Oak and Stratford closed in February 2010 to enable the installation of a new signalling system and the extension of platforms across the network. The line reopened on 1 June 2010, initially with a reduced service and none on Sundays. The full seven-day service resumed on 22 May 2011, with extra services running all day in place of the additional shuttle trains which had previously run between Camden Road and Stratford stations in the morning and evening peaks.

=== Opening of second entrance ===
A new entrance from the south in Graham Road with ticket office and footbridge was opened in 2022.

== Services ==
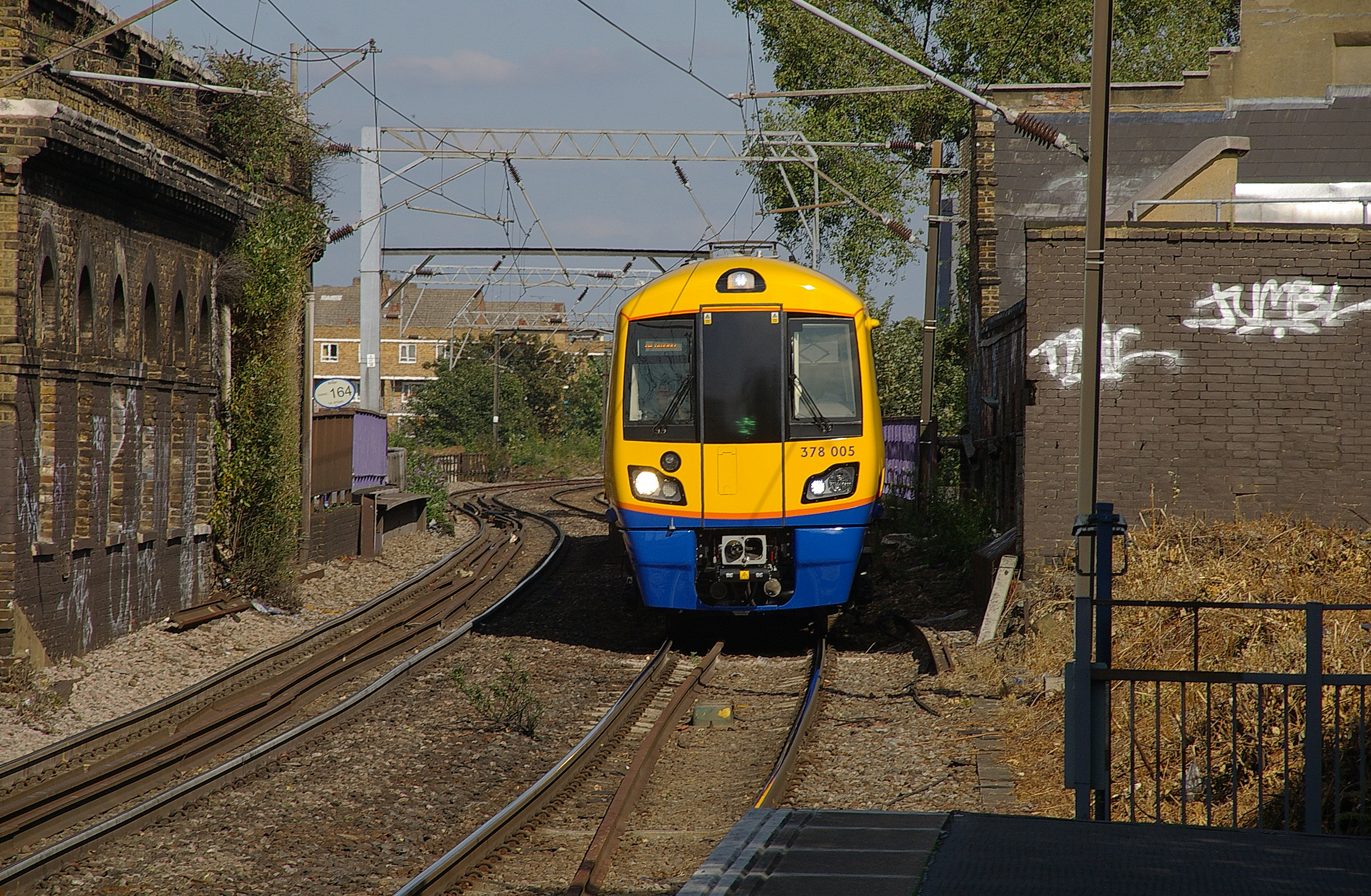
London Overground Class 378 Capitalstar unit 378005 approaches Hackney Central. Units such as this operate most services at the station. Others are operated by Class 710 "Aventra" units.

The typical off-peak service in trains per hour (tph) is:

- 4 tph westbound to Richmond via Highbury & Islington, Camden Road and Willesden Junction
- 4 tph westbound to Clapham Junction
- 8 tph eastbound to Stratford

== Future proposals ==
=== Crossrail 2 ===
Hackney Central is a proposed stop on Crossrail 2. It would be between Angel and Tottenham Hale or Seven Sisters. The platforms would be underground, with a connection to the existing surface station.

=== Docklands Light Railway ===
In February 2006 the Docklands Light Railway (DLR) Horizon 2020 report, had suggested that the DLR be extended here from Bow Church via Old Ford and Homerton, taking over the old parts of the North London line to link up Poplar and Canary Wharf. However, most of the former North London line between Hackney Wick and Bow Church has been built on..

== Connections ==
London Bus routes 30, 38, 55, 106, 236, 242, 253, 254, 276, 277, 394 and W15 and night routes N38, N55, N242, N253 and N277 serve the station.

Preceding station	London Overground	Following station
Dalston Kingsland towards Clapham Junction or Richmond	Mildmay line North London line	Homerton towards Stratford
