= Route 22 (disambiguation) =

Route 22 is a common name for roads and highways in many countries.

Route 22 may also refer to:

- Route 22 (MTA Maryland), a bus route in Baltimore, Maryland, U.S.
- Route 22 (MBTA), a bus route in Boston, US
- London Buses route 22, a bus route in London, UK
- Melbourne tram route 22, a former tram route in Melbourne, Australia
- 22 Fillmore, a bus route in San Francisco

== See also ==
- Line 22 (disambiguation)
