= London Buses route 343 =

London bus route

343
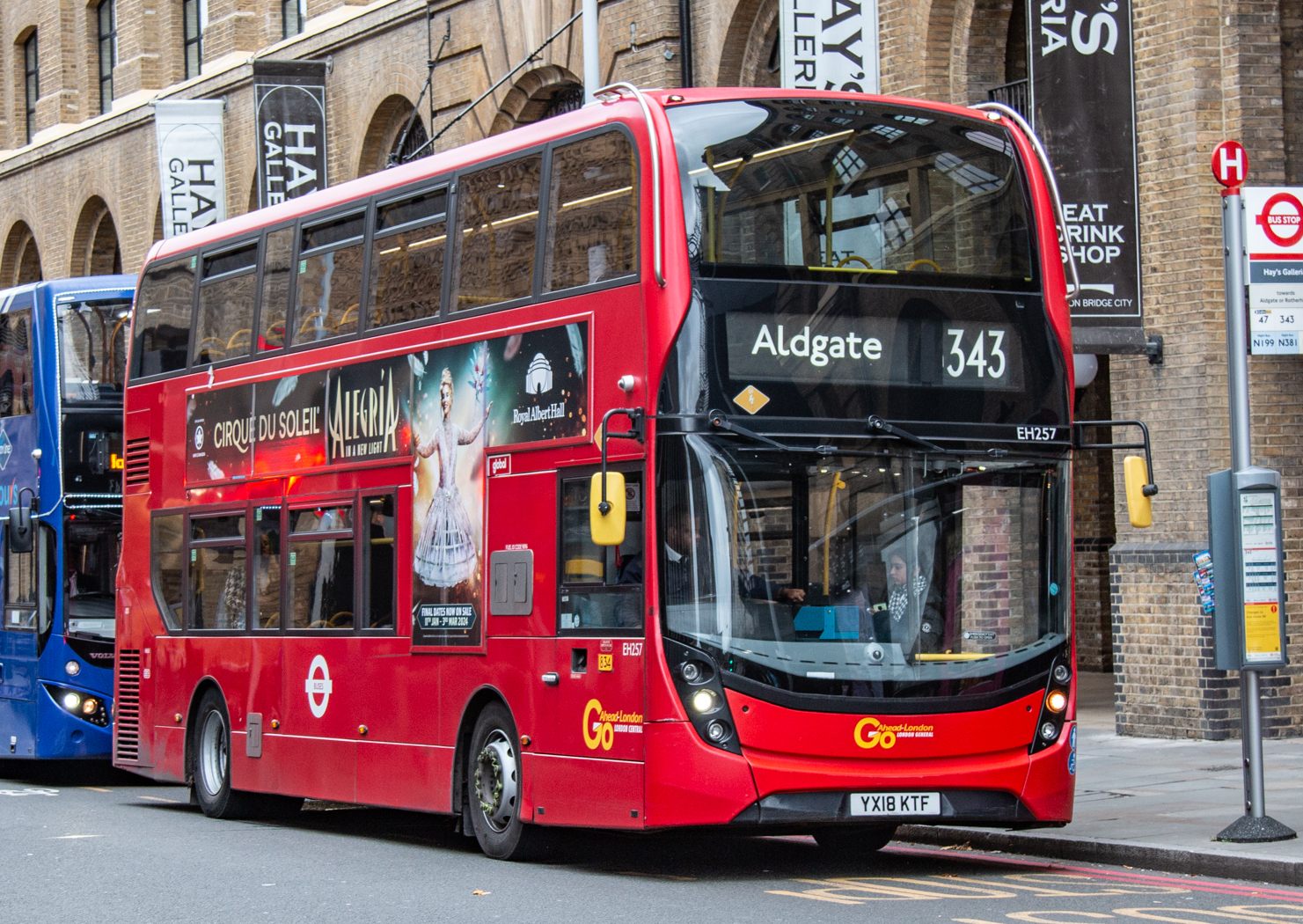
- London Central Alexander Dennis Enviro400H MMC at Hay's Galleria in December 2023

Overview
- Operator: London Central (Go-Ahead London)
- Garage: New Cross
- Vehicle: Alexander Dennis Enviro400H MMC
- Predecessors: Route P3
- Former operators: Abellio London; Travel London
- Night-time: N343

Route
- Start: Tower Gateway station
- Via: London Bridge; Elephant & Castle; Peckham; Brockley
- End: New Cross

London Buses route 343 is a Transport for London contracted bus route in London, England. Running between Tower Gateway station and New Cross, it is operated by Go-Ahead London subsidiary London Central.

== History ==
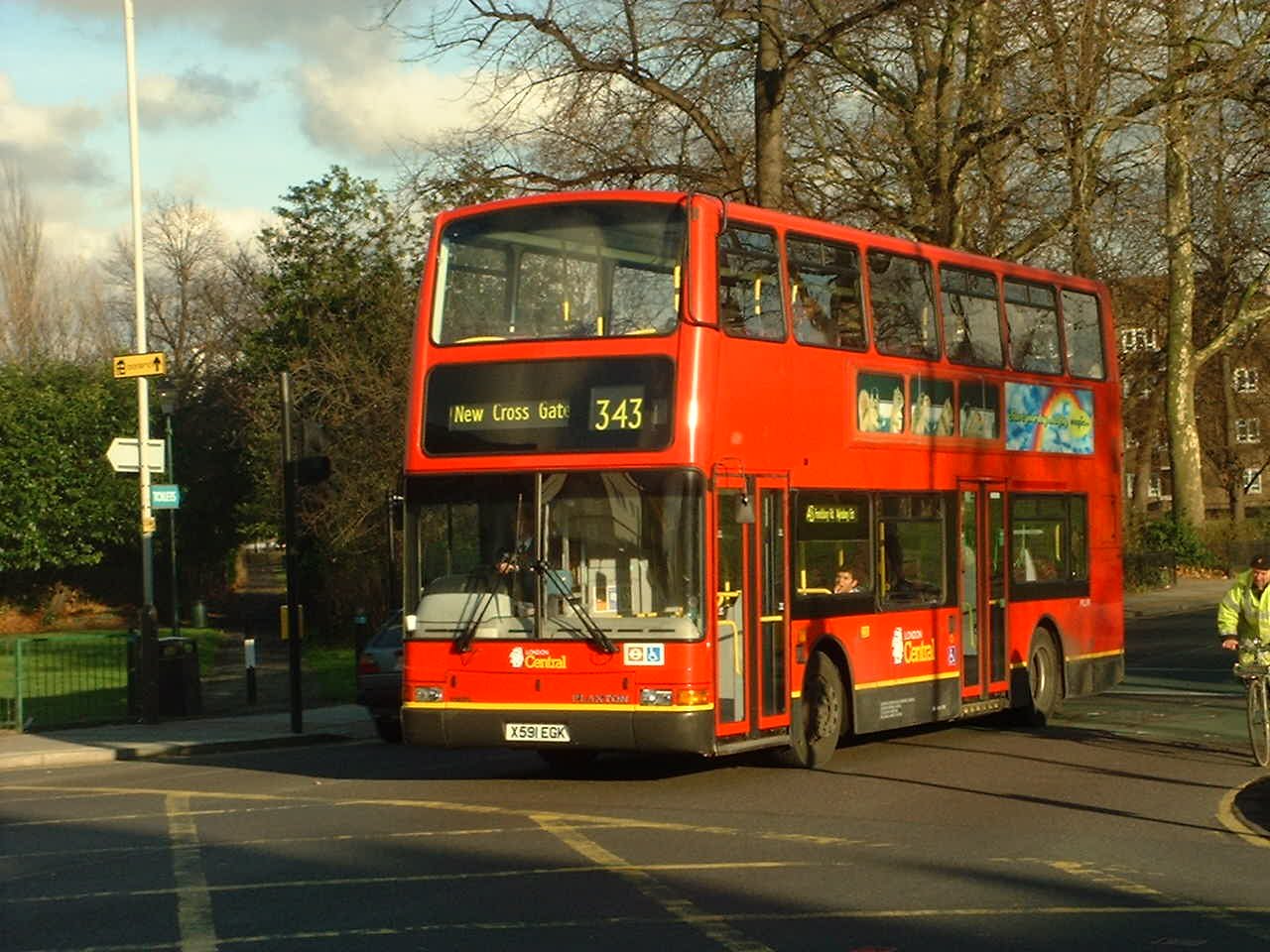
London Central Plaxton President bodied Volvo B7TL on route 343 in January 2004

When re-tendered, the route passed to Travel London's Walworth garage on 21 September 2005 with Wright Eclipse Gemini bodied Volvo B7TLs introduced.

Route 343 was included in the May 2009 sale of Travel London to Abellio London. Abellio London successfully tendered to retain the route with a new contract commencing on 5 May 2011.

In June 2010, the route was revealed to be amongst the ten worst performing in London. Two additional morning peak journeys were introduced on 12 June 2010 with the intention of solving the problems; performance improved as a result, although the route continued to receive complaints.

A proposal to increase the frequency of the route was announced by Transport for London in November 2010.

At 08:22 on 17 March 2012, a bus on route 343 caught fire on Pepys Road, New Cross. The fire was put out by 09:20 and there were no injuries.

On 25 June 2019, the route received an extension from City Hall to Aldgate bus station to replace part of the now withdrawn route RV1.

In October 2024, Transport for London launched a consultation proposing to withdraw route 343 between Tower Gateway station and Aldgate bus station. In February 2025, it was confirmed that the changes would proceed and they were implemented on 29 March 2025.

== Current route ==
Route 343 operates via these primary locations:

- Tower Gateway station
- Tower Bridge
- London Bridge station
- Borough station
- Elephant & Castle station
- Walworth
- Peckham High Street
- Peckham Rye station
- Brockley
- New Cross
