= Line 22 =

Line 22 may refer to:

- Line 22 (Beijing Subway), rapid transit line of the Beijing Subway, under construction, in Beijing and Sanhe, China
- Line 22 (Guangzhou Metro), metro line of the Guangzhou Metro in Guangzhou, Guangdong province, China
- Line 22 (São Paulo Metro), future metro line of the São Paulo Metro in São Paulo, Brazil
- Line 22 (Shanghai Metro), future metro line of Shanghai Metro in Shanghai, China

== See also ==
- Route 22 (disambiguation)
