= London Buses route 30 =

London bus route

30
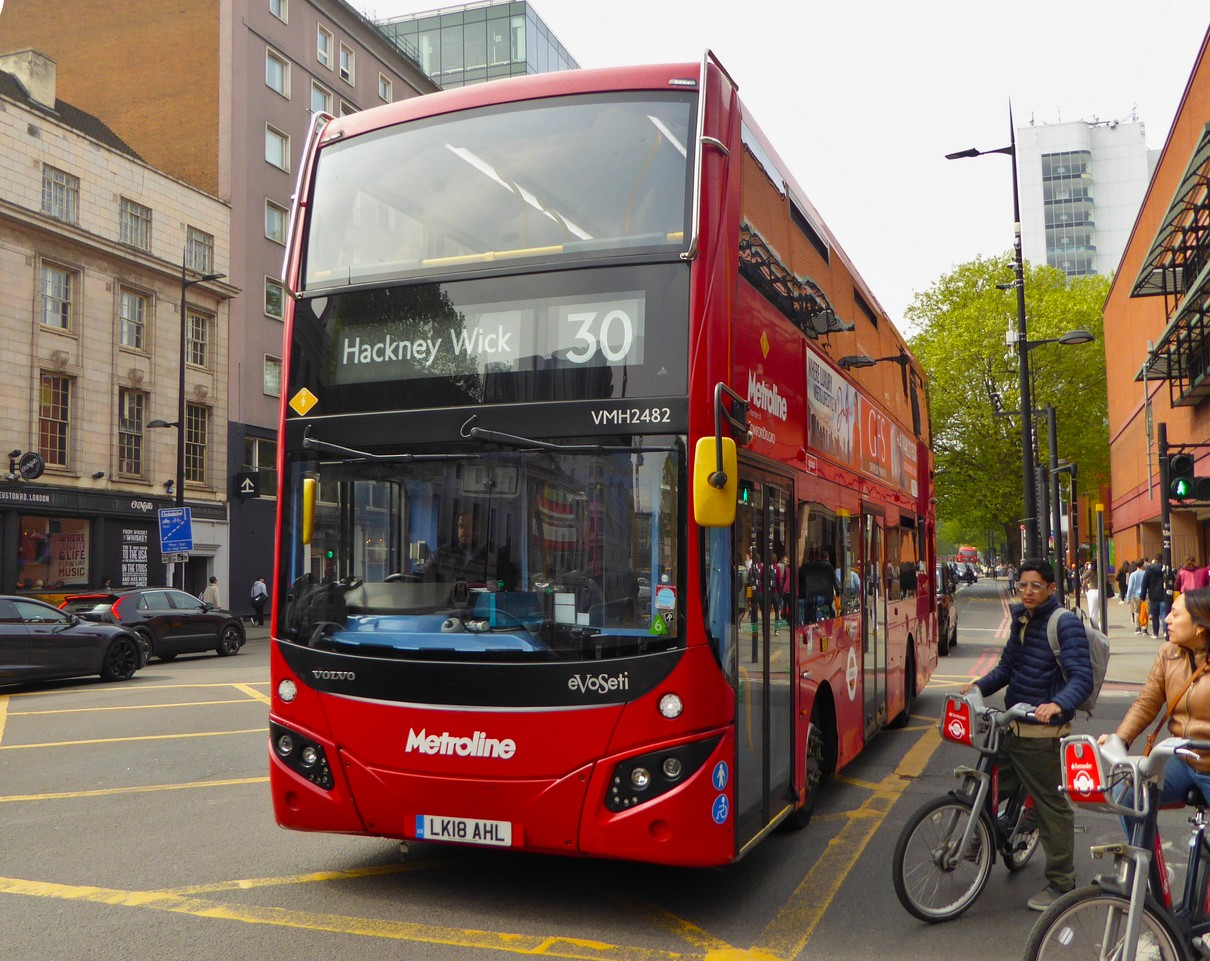
- Metroline MCV EvoSeti bodied Volvo B5LH at St Pancras International station in April 2025

Overview
- Operator: Metroline
- Garage: King's Cross
- Vehicle: Volvo B5LH MCV EvoSeti

Route
- Start: Hackney Wick
- Via: Hackney Central; Dalston; Canonbury; Islington; King's Cross
- End: Euston bus station

London Buses route 30 is a Transport for London contracted bus route in London, England. Running between Hackney Wick and Euston bus station, it is operated by Metroline.

== History ==
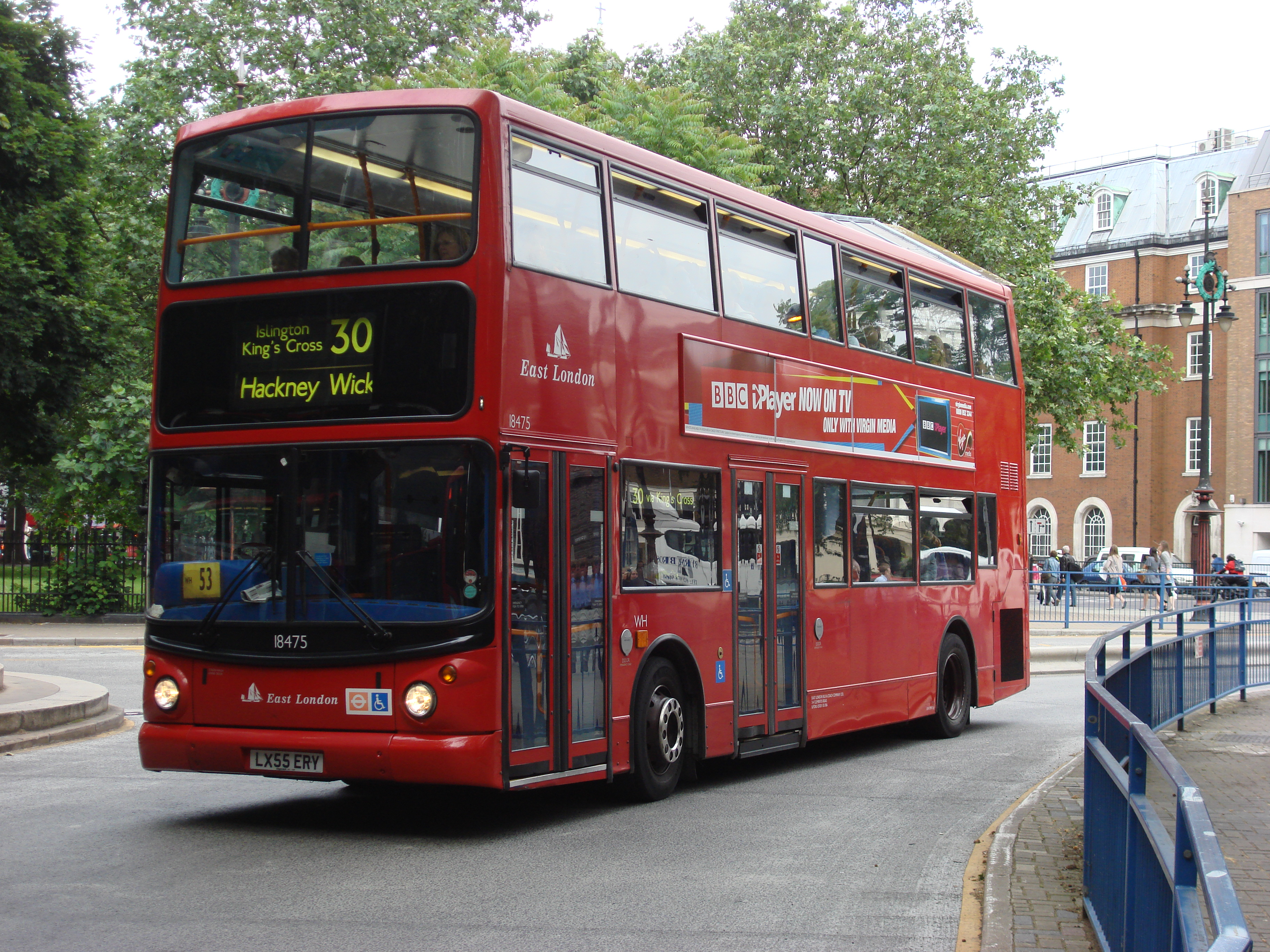
East London Alexander ALX400 bodied Dennis Trident 2 at Euston bus station in June 2008

By 1987 the route had been amended to run from Hackney to Earl's Court, taking about 75 minutes to complete the journey, at a frequency of one bus every 14 minutes. Driver-only operation was introduced in January 1987 with double-deckers, and three months later the route was reported to be carrying around 20,000 passengers per day.

In June 2010, the route was revealed to be the sixth worst performing route in London. As a result of this, new bus priority measures were introduced on the route.

Upon being re-tendered in 2010, the route was awarded to First London from 25 June 2011.

On 22 June 2013, route 30 was included in the sale of First London's Lea Interchange garage to Tower Transit.

On 23 June 2018, the route passed to Metroline operating from their King's Cross (KC) garage.

In 2021, the service frequency during morning and evening peaks Monday to Friday was reduced from 7 buses per hour to 6.

In October 2024, Transport for London opened a public consultation proposing to withdraw route 30 between Euston bus station and Marble Arch station. In May 2025, it was confirmed that the changes would proceed and they were implemented on 21 June 2025.

== Bomb incident ==
On 7 July 2005 at 09:47, a Stagecoach London Dennis Trident 2 double-decker bus, fleet number 17758, registration LX03 BUF, was involved in a terrorist attack perpetrated by Hasib Hussain, a bomb in whose rucksack exploded, killing 13 other passengers as well as himself. The explosion ripped the roof off the top deck of the bus and destroyed the back of the vehicle. The detonation took place close to the British Medical Association building in Tavistock Square. The bus was off line of route and on diversion due to earlier multiple attacks on the London Underground system. The bus was replaced by the first Alexander Dennis Enviro400 produced, named Spirit of London to symbolise the courage of Londoners.

== Current route ==
Route 30 operates via these primary locations:

- Hackney Wick
- Hackney Central station
- Hackney Downs station
- Dalston Junction station
- Canonbury
- Highbury Corner
- Angel station
- King's Cross station
- St Pancras International station
- Euston bus station for Euston station

== Cultural references ==
Route 30 is mentioned in the song "Kiss Me Deadly", by the pop music band Generation X, which was released on their self-titled 1978 long-player.

The bus is also mentioned in Bloc Party's 2007 single "Hunting for Witches". The song references the 7 July 2005 London bombings.
