= Euston bus station =

Bus station in London, England

Euston Bus Station
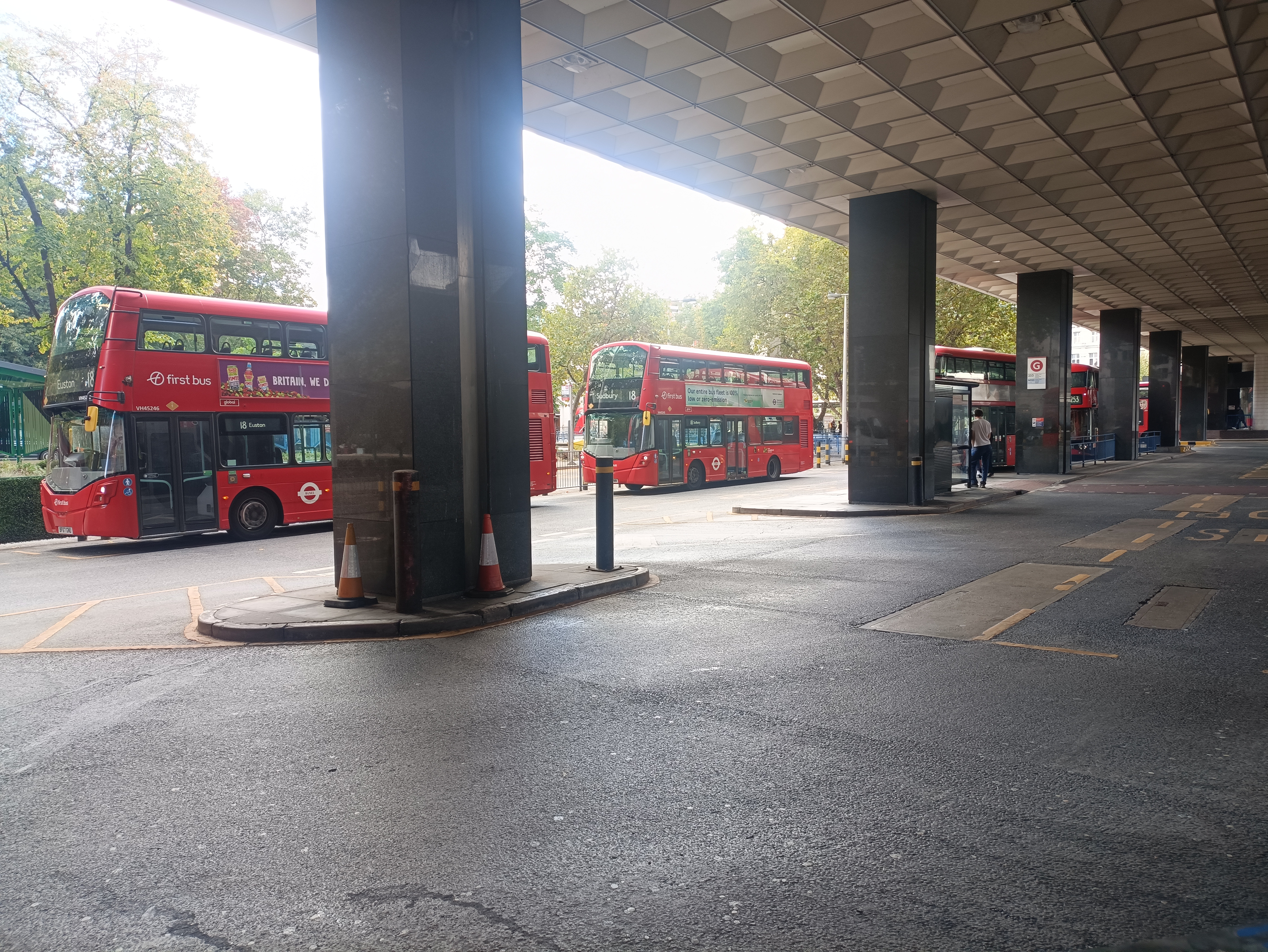
- The bus station in 2025

General information
- Location: Euston, Camden, England; London Borough of Camden
- Coordinates: 51.5275°N 0.1325°W
- Operator: Transport for London
- Bus stands: 5
- Bus operators: Arriva London; London Central; London General; London United; Metroline; Stagecoach London
- Connections: Euston station (adjacent)

History
- Opened: 1979
Location
- Location within Central London

Euston Bus Station serves the Euston area of Camden, London, England. The station is owned and maintained by Transport for London.

It is situated next to Euston main line railway station and above Euston Underground station and near Euston Square. It was designed by Richard Seifert and opened in 1979.

There are five stands at the bus station that are served by routes operated by Arriva London, London Central, London General, London United, Metroline, Stagecoach London and Tower Transit.

London Buses routes 1, 18, 30, 68, 73, 91, 205, 253, 390 and night routes N5, N20, N73, N91, N205 and N253 serve the bus station.

== See also ==
- List of bus and coach stations in London
