= London Buses route 38 =

London bus route

38
- Arriva London New Routemaster at Cambridge Circus in October 2026

Overview
- Operator: Arriva London
- Garage: Clapton
- Vehicle: New Routemaster
- Peak vehicle requirement: 16
- Night-time: Night Bus N38

Route
- Start: Clapton Pond
- Via: Hackney Central; Essex Road; Angel
- End: High Holborn
- Length: 5 miles (8.0 km)

Service
- Level: Daily
- Frequency: Every 10-12 minutes
- Journey time: 28-72 minutes
- Operates: 05:30 until 01:30

London Buses route 38 is a Transport for London contracted bus route in London, England. Running between Clapton Pond and High Holborn, it is operated by Arriva London.

== History ==
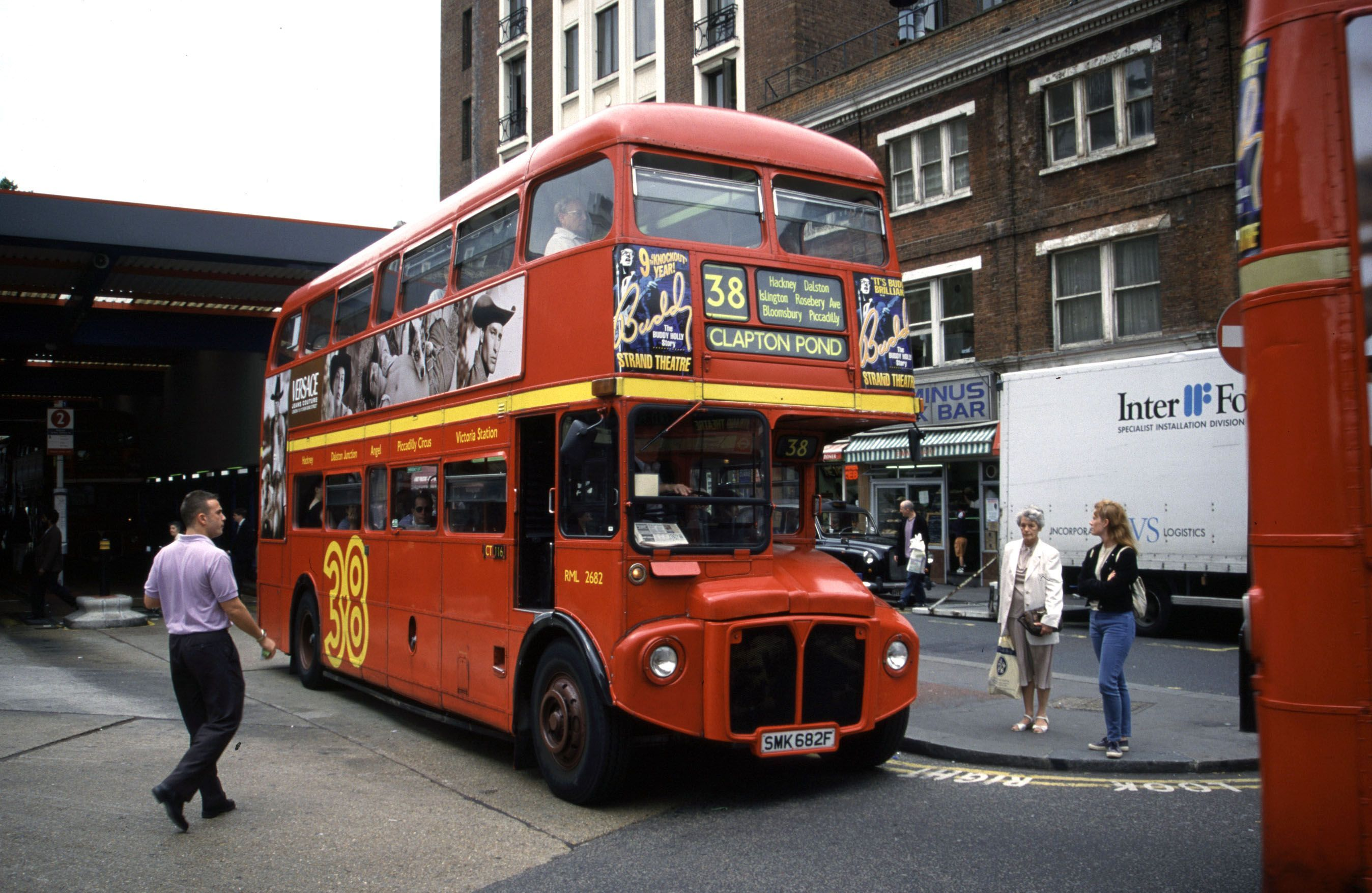
AEC Routemaster at Victoria bus station in August 1998

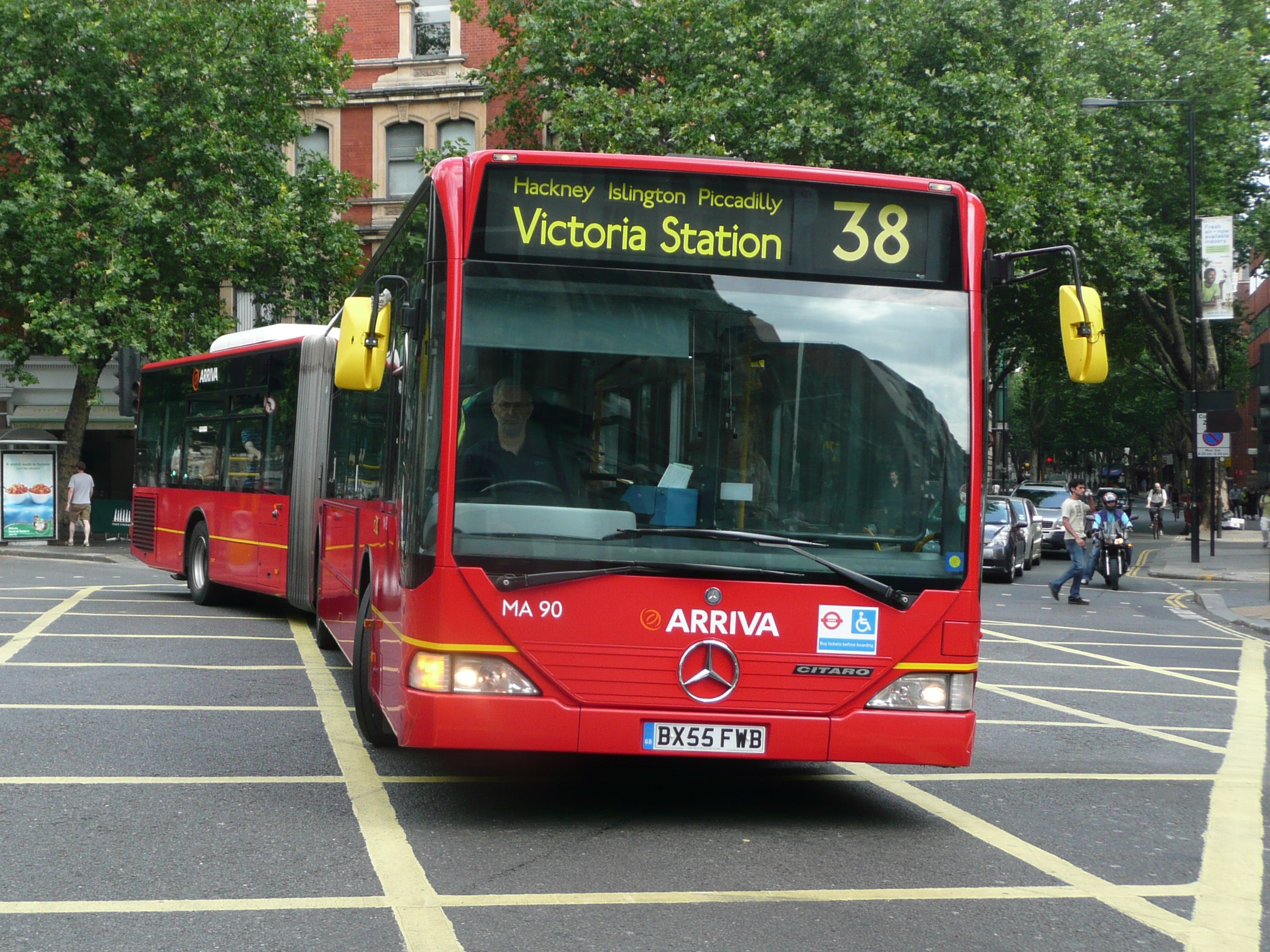
Arriva London Mercedes-Benz O530G on the corner of Tottenham Court Road & Shaftesbury Avenue in July 2008

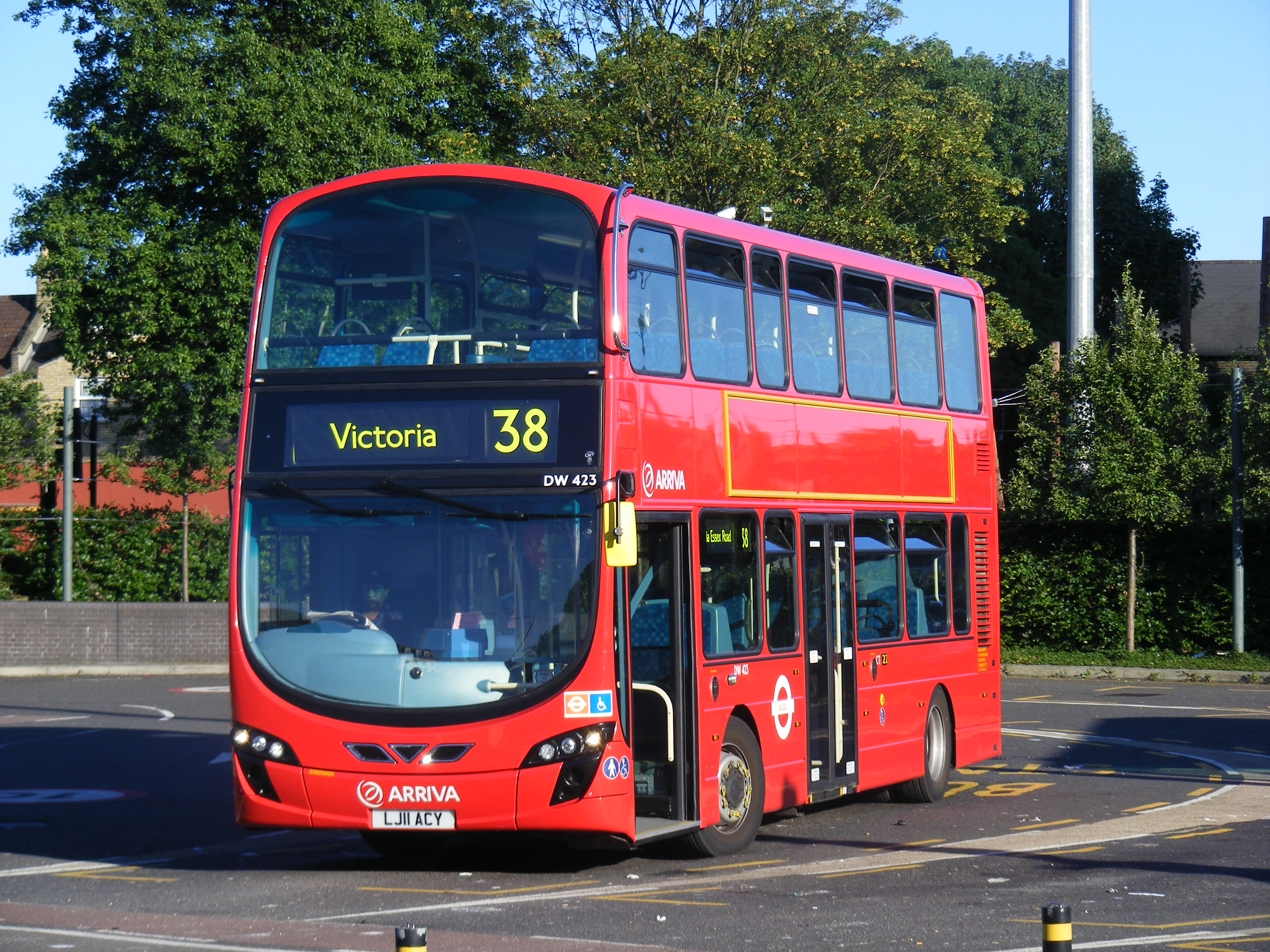
Arriva London Wright Gemini 2 DL bodied VDL DB300 at Clapton Pond in June 2011

Route 38 was introduced on 16 June 1912 as a Monday to Saturday route between Victoria and Leyton Green via Angel, Dalston, Clapton and Lea Bridge Road and between Victoria and Epping Forest on Sundays. It was operated from Leyton garage, which opened on the same day. In 1913 a 38A was introduced, taking over the Sunday service and operating between Victoria and Epping Forest.

World War I restrictions saw many changes to routes 38 and 38A including withdrawals over certain sections for short periods. The most important of these occurred on 15 May 1916 when the 38 and 38A exchanged their eastern branches permanently. Route 38 was withdrawn between the Bakers Arms and Woodford and re-routed to Walthamstow (Hoe Street station). In 1919 a 38B was added, running through to Loughton, with the 38A only running as far as Woodford. The 38A disappeared in 1921.

On 1 December 1924, a new system of route numbering on London Buses came into force under the London Traffic Act 1924. Route 38 was unchanged; route 38B was renumbered to 138. Both routes had short working suffixed journeys numbered 38A, 38B, 38C, 38D, 138A, 138B as well as 38E, which was the main daily route Victoria Station to Chingford. This situation remained until 3 October 1934, when the newly constituted London Passenger Transport Board instituted its own numbering system. The 38, 38A and 38E became plain 38. The 138 became 38A.

From 5 January 1938, on Mondays to Fridays only, route 38 was reduced between Leyton and Chingford and route 38A withdrawn completely. In replacement a route 38B was introduced between Loughton, Woodford, Leyton, Walthamstow and Chingford. From 3 August 1938 route 38B was withdrawn, and routes 38 and 38A returned to normal.

As a wartime economy routes 38 and 38A were re-routed between Clapton and Dalston on the direct route via Cricketfield Road (avoiding Hackney) on 5 May 1943. On 15 April 1959 route 38A was re-routed via Hackney Central station to replace withdrawn trolleybus route 581. From 1946 until 1965, route 38 also had a summer Sunday extension from Chingford station to Epping Forest via Rangers Road and Epping New Road.

Following the opening of the first section of the Victoria line between Walthamstow Central and Highbury & Islington, on 7 September 1968 a large scale re-organisation of London Buses took place. Route 38A was withdrawn, being replaced by three new routes; Red Arrow route 505 between Victoria and Piccadilly Circus, route 48 between Dalston and Whipps Cross and route 20 between Leyton and Loughton. Between Dalston and Hackney route 38A was also replaced by a re-routed 38, which was cut back from Chingford to Walthamstow Garage, being replaced by route 69 over this section.

On 25 October 1969 route 38 was further cut back to terminate at Leyton Green, being replaced on the Walthamstow section by the newly introduced route 55. The Sunday service was converted to one-person operation on 6 June 1987. When London Buses was divided into 11 subsidiaries, the operation of route 38 was taken over by London Forest. London Forest was wound up in 1991; the route then became a joint operation between Leaside Buses and East London, before being transferred to Leaside Buses.

On 29 Oct 2005, route 38 was converted to one man operation with the AEC Routemasters replaced by 46 Mercedes-Benz O530G articulated buses. Double deck buses were introduced on 14 November 2009 as part of the Mayor of London's policy to withdraw articulated buses from London. The frequency of the route was increased to every 2–3 minutes.

Eight prototype New Routemasters were introduced in February 2012. Full conversion to New Routemasters occurred on 10 May 2014. On 12 November 2016, Arriva London commenced a further contract.

In 2015/16 it was the seventh busiest TfL bus service, with 12.3 million passengers.

In 2021, the maximum frequency of the route was reduced from 15 buses per hour to 12.

Between 28 November 2025 and 23 January 2026, Transport for London proposed for route 38 to be cut back to High Holborn from Victoria bus station and to have its Saturday frequency reduced from every six minutes to every ten minutes. TfL later confirmed that they would proceed with the proposed changes; they were implemented on 14 November 2026.

== Current route ==
Route 38 operates via these primary locations:

- Clapton Pond Lea Bridge Roundabout
- Clapton Girls' Academy
- Hackney Central station
- Dalston Junction station
- Essex Road station
- Islington Green
- Angel station
- Sadler's Wells Theatre
- Holborn station
- High Holborn New Oxford Street

== In popular culture ==
Grime MC and Bow resident Wiley mentioned the route 38 in his lyrics. An example of which is "I'm like the 38 bus cos I never turn up!".

Connan Mockasin expressed similar sentiments in his song "Forever Dolphin Love" with the lyrics "The 38 that took too long to Dalston".

An AEC Routemaster bus with route 38 blinds is displayed in the Falkland Islands capital of Port Stanley.

The bus and its route is central to the children's book Gaspard's Foxtrot by Zeb Soanes and James Mayhew, listing many of its stops and landmarks along the way. It has been adapted as a concert work by the composer Jonathan Dove.
