= Clapton Pond =

Pond and garden in London, England

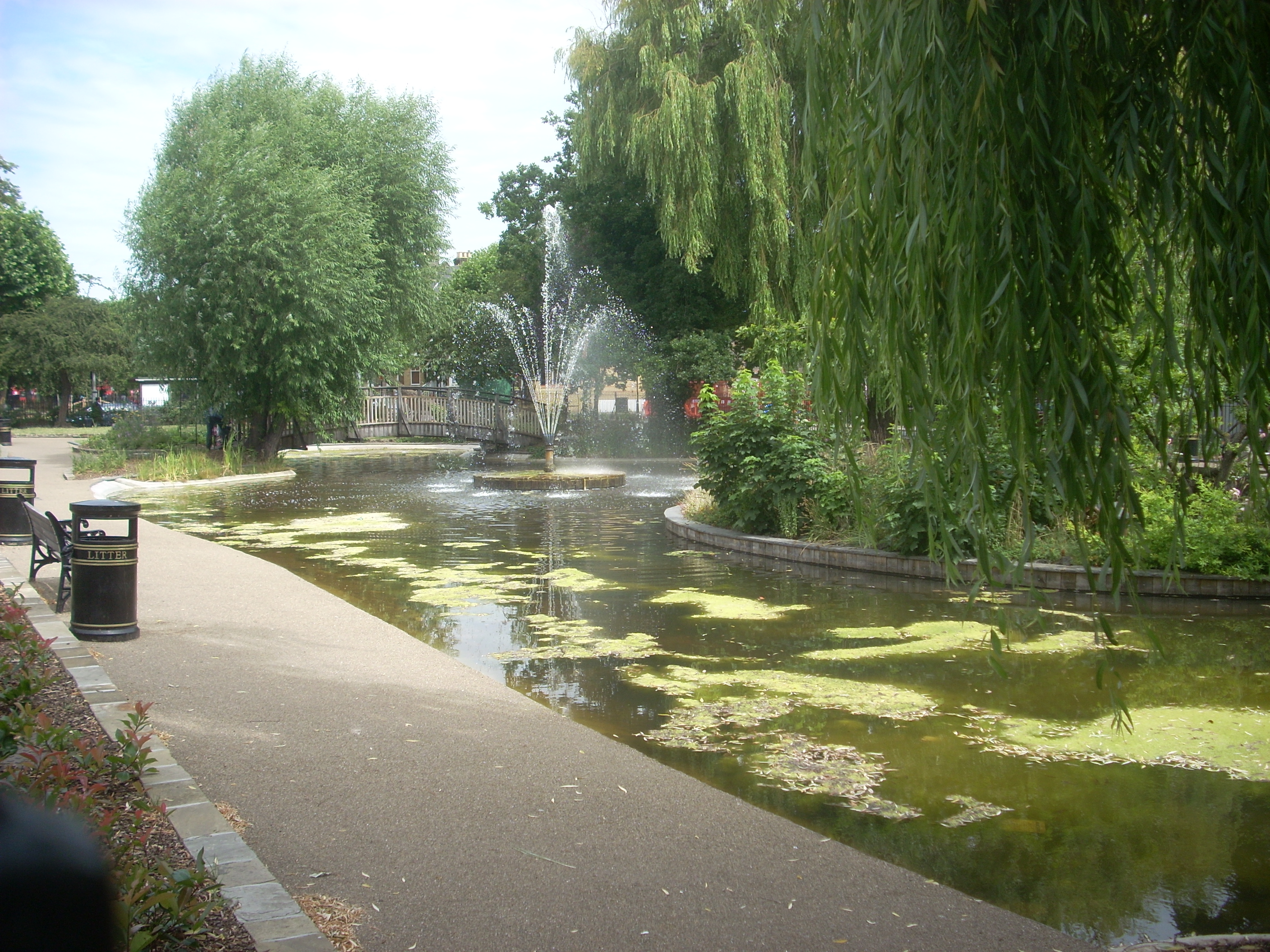
- Clapton Pond from the South West corner.

- Location within Greater London Location within England Location within the United Kingdom
- Location: Clapton, London
- Coordinates: 51.5561°N 0.0550°W
- Type: pond

Clapton Pond is a pond and garden at Clapton in the London Borough of Hackney. The pond has existed since the 1600s.

== History ==
The name ‘Clapton’ or ‘farm on the hill’ is derived from the Old English words ‘clop’, meaning a lump or hill, and ‘ton’, meaning a farm.

For centuries the land was owned by the Bishops of London, and occupied by tenant farmers who grew hay and food for the City of London.

The villages of Lower and Upper Clapton lay on either side of Clapton Lane, which later became the Lower and Upper Clapton Roads. Lying about halfway between the two villages was Clapton Pond, fed by a natural spring. This would have been used to irrigate the land, and supply water for the farmers and their animals.

By the late 18th century Clapton had become a fashionable place to live, with many fine country houses built for the rich merchants of London. Huguenot and Jewish communities also moved into the area, helping to develop Clapton into a prosperous neighbourhood.

In the 19th century Clapton turned from being a sleepy backwater into a bustling London suburb and many of its grand houses were demolished to provide land for new homes. This rapid growth was increased by the opening of Clapton railway station in 1872, and the arrival of the tramways. By the 1890s, the houses on Thistlewaite, Newick, Mildenhall and Millfields Roads had been built, supplying much needed housing for newcomers.

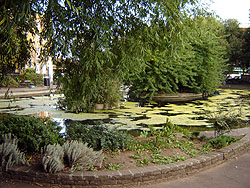
Another view of Clapton Pond

Despite the decline of Clapton's prosperity in the 1920s and 1930s, the first half of the 20th century saw Clapton Pond at its most glorious, a perfect setting for the unique buildings situated behind the pond - the 17th-century Bishop Wood's Almshouses, the late 18th-century Pond House and the two mid 18th-century houses.

== Transport ==
Transport for London operates several bus stops adjacent to the pond which bear the name Clapton Pond. Routes that utilize the Clapton Pond stations include London Bus route 38, route 55, and route 253.

== Community ==
The pond and gardens have served as a focal point for the people of Clapton, from the few farmers who worked the land hundreds of years ago, to the multi-cultural community living and working in Clapton in the 21st century, who use it for public events and as a place to relax. London based poet Kae Tempest used Clapton Pond as the setting of her work On Clapton Pond at Dawn.

The skeleton of a chicken was found at the bottom of the pond in 2011.

In recent years the Clapton Pond Neighbourhood Action Group has been working to renovate the pond. In 2021, Hackney Council completed renovations to the play spaces near the pond.

== Wildlife ==
The pond is home to several wild ducks and aquatic fish. The garden is also a common feeding spot for seagulls and pigeons.
