= London Buses route 22 =

London bus route

22
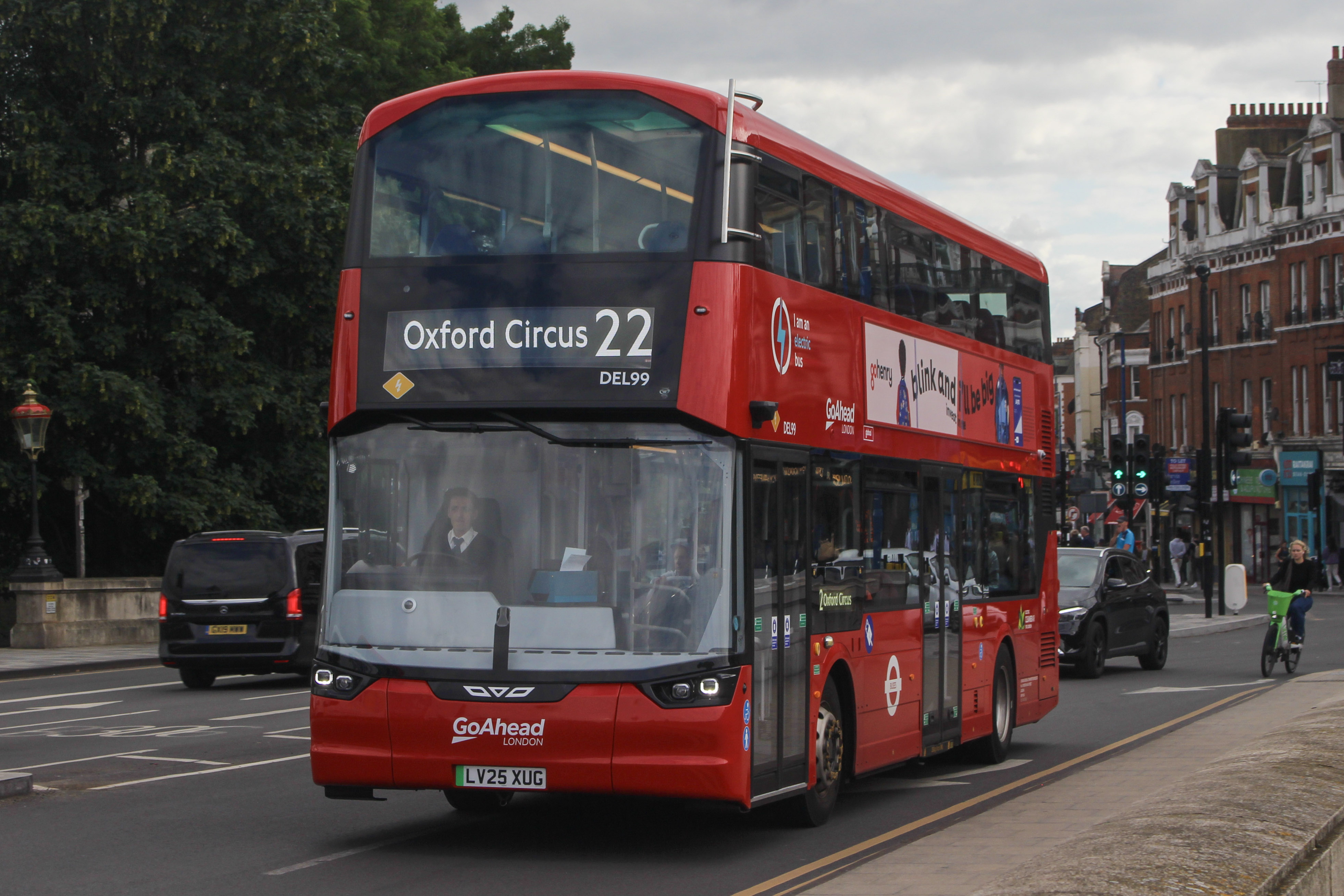
- London General Wright StreetDeck Electroliner on Putney Bridge in June 2026

Overview
- Operator: London General (Go-Ahead London)
- Garage: Putney
- Vehicle: Wright StreetDeck Electroliner
- Peak vehicle requirement: 17
- Night-time: Night Bus N22

Route
- Start: Oxford Circus station
- Via: Berkeley Square; Green Park station Hyde Park Corner; Sloane Square; King's Road
- End: Putney Lower Common
- Length: 6 miles (9.7 km)

Service
- Level: Daily
- Frequency: About every 7 minutes
- Journey time: 31-58 minutes
- Operates: 06:00 until 01:00

London Buses route 22 is a Transport for London contracted bus route in London, England. Running between Oxford Circus station and Putney Lower Common, it is operated by Go-Ahead London subsidiary London General.

== History ==
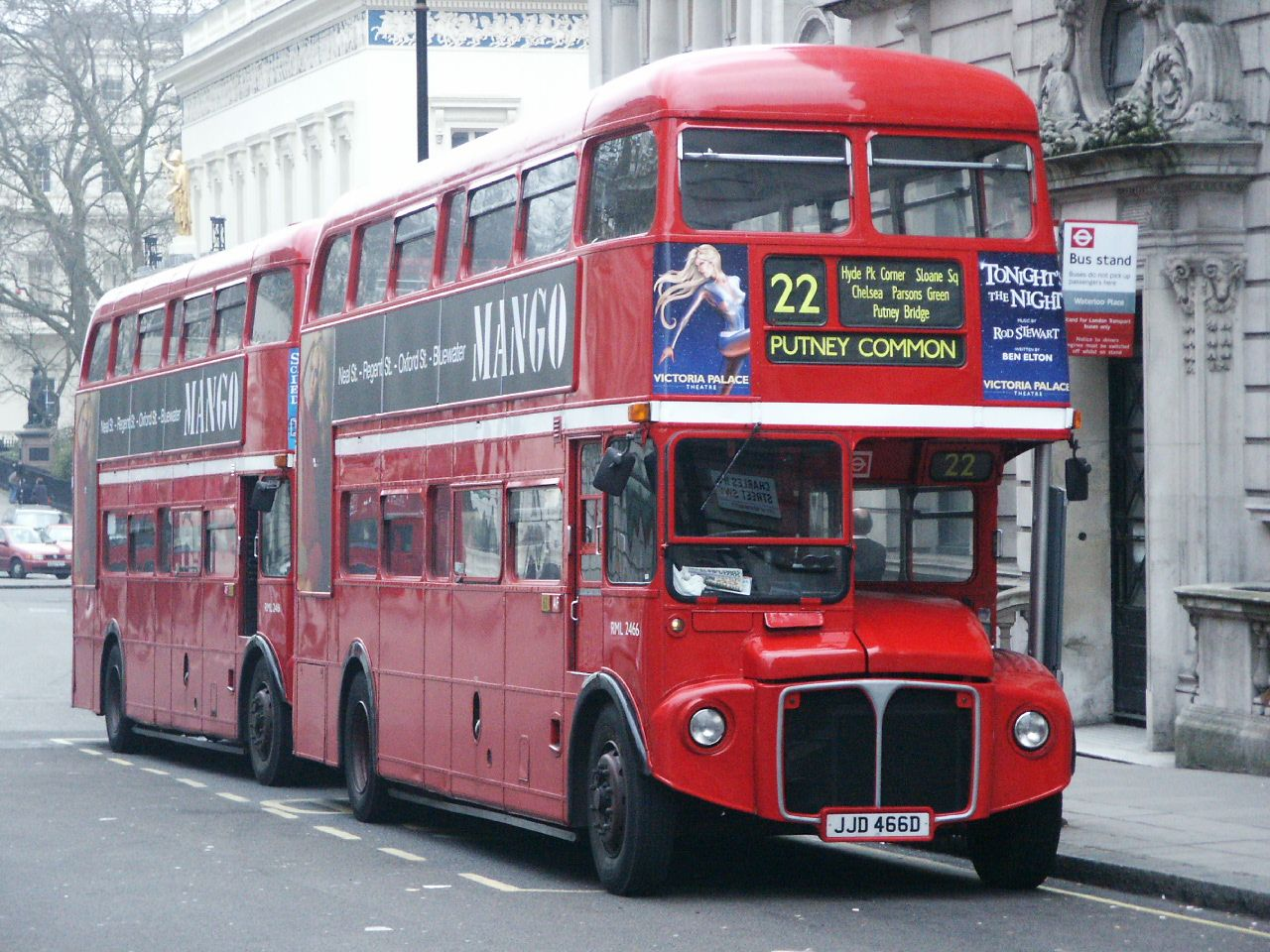
London General AEC Routemaster on Regent Street in March 2004

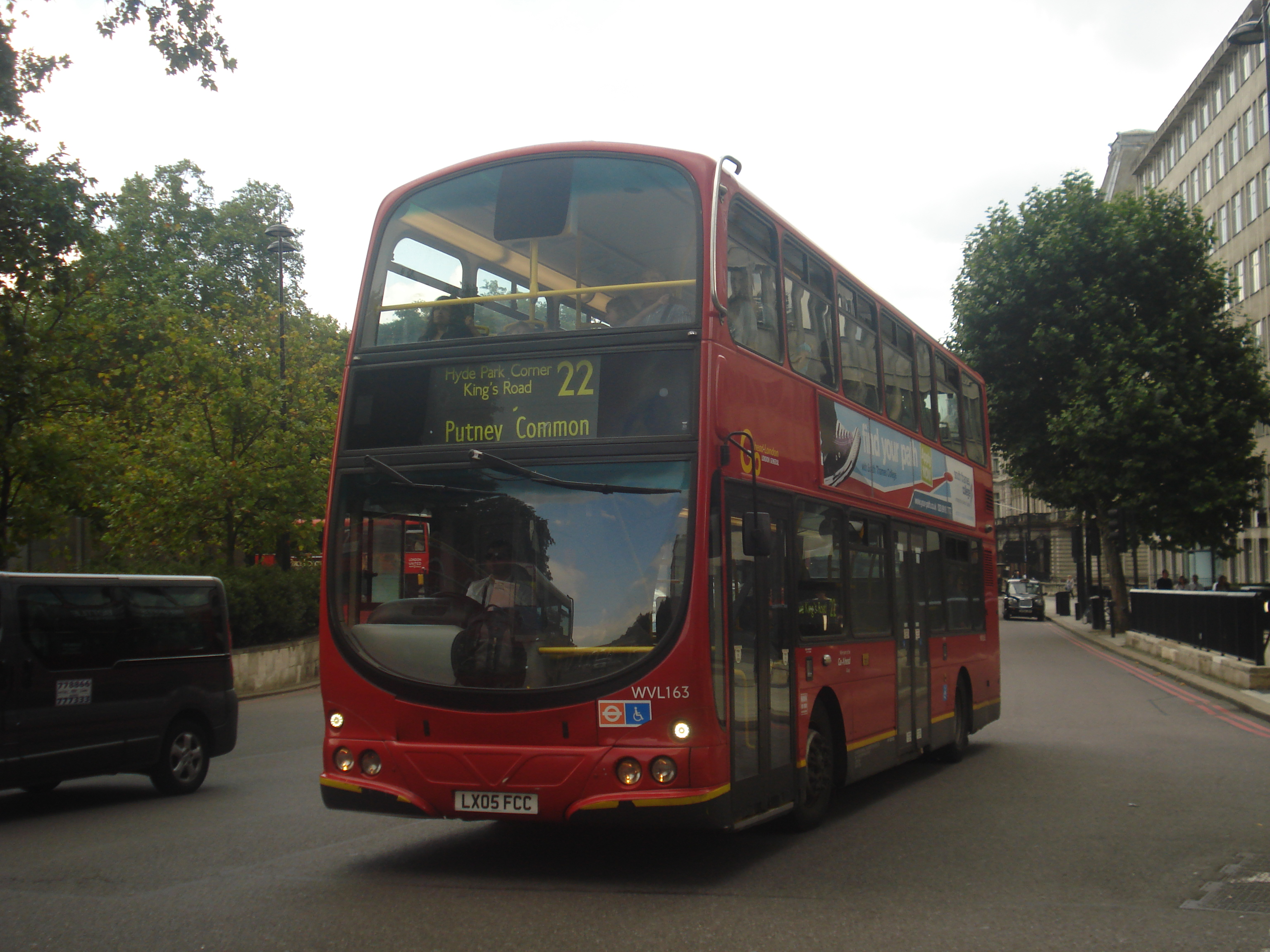
Go-Ahead London Wright Eclipse Gemini bodied Volvo B7TL at Hyde Park Corner in August 2013

Route 22 commenced operation on 17 May 1909 between Clapton (Lea Bridge station) and Elephant & Castle via Clapton, Hackney, Dalston, Shoreditch, London Bridge and Borough. On 26 July 1909, it was extended to Leyton with a Sunday extension to Epping Forest via Whipps Cross and Woodford replacing route 9.

On 28 October 1909, route 22 was changed again to work between Tulse Hill and Leyton via Effra Road, Brixton Road, Kennington Park Road, Elephant & Castle and Whipps Cross. On 3 January 1910, it was cut back again to work Clapton (Lea Bridge station) to Tulse Hill.

From 6 April 1911, route 22 was withdrawn between Bank and Elephant & Castle, being replaced by new route 35 over that section. At the same time it was extended to Putney station via Cheapside, Holborn, Piccadilly, King's Road and Putney Bridge. The daily extension to Homerton (Clapton Park Tavern) commenced soon after on 12 June 1911, but the route was withdrawn throughout on Sundays on 8 October 1911 for just over three years until 8 November 1914, when it became daily once again.

The connection with route 35 became clear once again as from 6 August 1916, when route 22 was diverted daily at Putney Bridge to run to Putney Common, but withdrawn on Sundays between Lower Clapton and Homerton being extended to Chingford via Leyton and Walthamstow, replacing route 35A on that day. This change was very short lived and route 22 reverted to being a daily Putney Common to Homerton route on 2 October 1916.

On 1 December 1924, short-workings between Tottenham Court Road and Putney were numbered 22A, short-workings between Tottenham Court Road and Homerton were numbered 22B and short-workings between Piccadilly Circus and Homerton were numbered 22C. The plain 22 route number being used for journeys for the whole length of the route from Putney Common to Homerton. By 30 June 1925, these had been reduced to 22 Putney Common to Homerton and 22A Piccadilly Circus - Homerton. This situation remained until 3 October 1934, when the newly constituted London Passenger Transport Board instituted its own numbering system, which generally re-instated the situation previous to December 1924, in this case, leaving just the plain 22 to work Putney Common to Homerton.

On 9 August 1939, RT1 buses were used to run the route from Homerton to Putney.

By the 1990s, the three short workings had become 3 distinct routes, with route 22 from Putney Common to Piccadilly Circus, route 22A running from London Bridge to Clapton Park and route 22B from Homerton Hospital to Piccadilly Circus. Owing to the confusion, the 22A and 22B routes were withdrawn in 1998, and replaced by a new route 242 and an extension of route 149.

Upon being re-tendered, London General commenced a new seven-year contract from 22 July 2000. On 22 July 2005, crewed operation finished with the AEC Routemasters replaced by Wright Eclipse Gemini bodied Volvo B7TLs.

On 20 October 2012, Go-Ahead London commenced a new contract after successfully re-tendering to retain the route. On 15 July 2017, the route was withdrawn between Green Park station and Piccadilly Circus and diverted to Oxford Circus via Berkeley Square to replace route C2. On 21 October 2017, London General commenced a further contract. It is operated out of Putney garage with a peak vehicle requirement of 17.

In 2021, the service frequency during peak times was reduced from 8 buses per hour to 6.

== Current route ==
Route 22 operates via these primary locations:

- Oxford Circus station
- Berkeley Square
- Green Park station
- Hyde Park Corner station
- Knightsbridge station
- Sloane Square station
- King's Road
- Chelsea World's End
- Parsons Green
- Fulham High Street
- Putney Bridge station
- Putney Lower Common
