= Edwin Henry Horne =

English architect (1843–1915)

Edwin Henry Horne (1843–1915) was an English architect working in the Victorian era and best known for the six spacious new station buildings opened by the North London Railway between 1870 and 1872 to reflect the growing importance of the line."By E.H.Horne they were designed in a distinctive Venetian Gothic style not repeated elsewhere on the railways in England." His Camden Road Station, listed by Historic England, is one of the few suburban stations of the period to survive in London. A petition to Parliament to rebuild the 1872 facade of his Highbury & Islington station was lodged in 2015. In a career cut short at the age of 37, Horne's last major work was the heritage listed church, St John's Ealing.

== Life and career ==
Born on 16 April 1843 in London, he was the tenth of thirteen children of Swithin Horne of Regent's Park. In 1860, he was articled for five years to the architect George Rowden Burnell. Following some early independent work, he was engaged by the NLR to replace six of the earlier wooden stations with distinctive buildings to project the Company's image and accommodate the increasing number of passengers using the line. Located at Highbury and Islington, Bow, Barnsbury, Canonbury, Camden Town and Hackney, these new stations with their vast booking halls, mansard roofs & arcades of shops were described in" London's Historic Stations." Today only two of Horne’s stations survive. "Sadly the magnificent station buildings of the North London Railway designed by E. H. Horne in the Venetian Gothic style and constructed of white Suffolk brick, Portland stone and terracotta have mostly gone." In the 1870s Horne took on assistants Charles Rennels Hancock and Alfred Granby Winsor and in 1874 he was chosen from a field of twelve architects to design and supervise the building of St John's Church, Ealing. He was elected an associate member of the Royal Institute of British Architects on 15 November 1875. Forced by ill-health to move to France in 1880, he died on 26 August 1915 in Church Place, Dover and is buried in St Mary's Cemetery, Dover

== Architectural Work ==
Highbury and Islington Station 1872

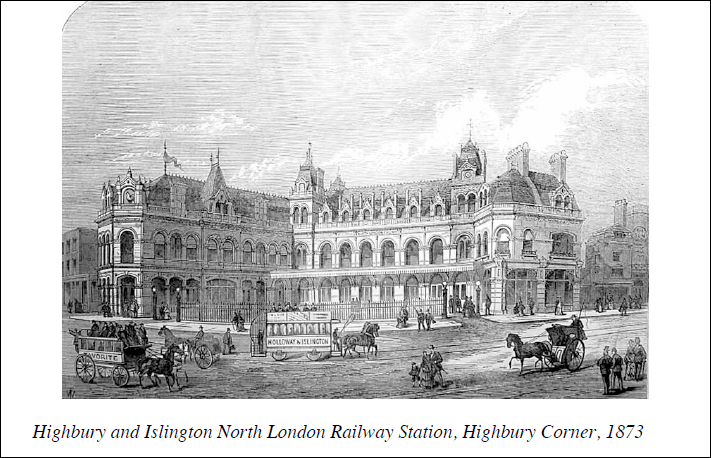
View of Higbury & Islington Station first appearing in the London Illustrated News, April 1873

The last and largest of Horne's stations was the Italianate Highbury and Islington, which was completed in 1872 and consisted of three wings. His designs for the station were exhibited at the Royal Academy in the summer exhibition of 1873. On 19 April that year The Illustrated London News carried a detailed description, naming Horne as architect. The station was first damaged during the Blitz in 1940, when the mansard roof and the upper storey were lost and again in 1944, when a flying bomb hit Highbury Corner, killing 26 people and causing devastating damage to the station & surrounding buildings. Although temporary repairs were carried out in the post-war years, Highbury & Islington was never restored to its full former use as a passenger station.

Camden Road Station

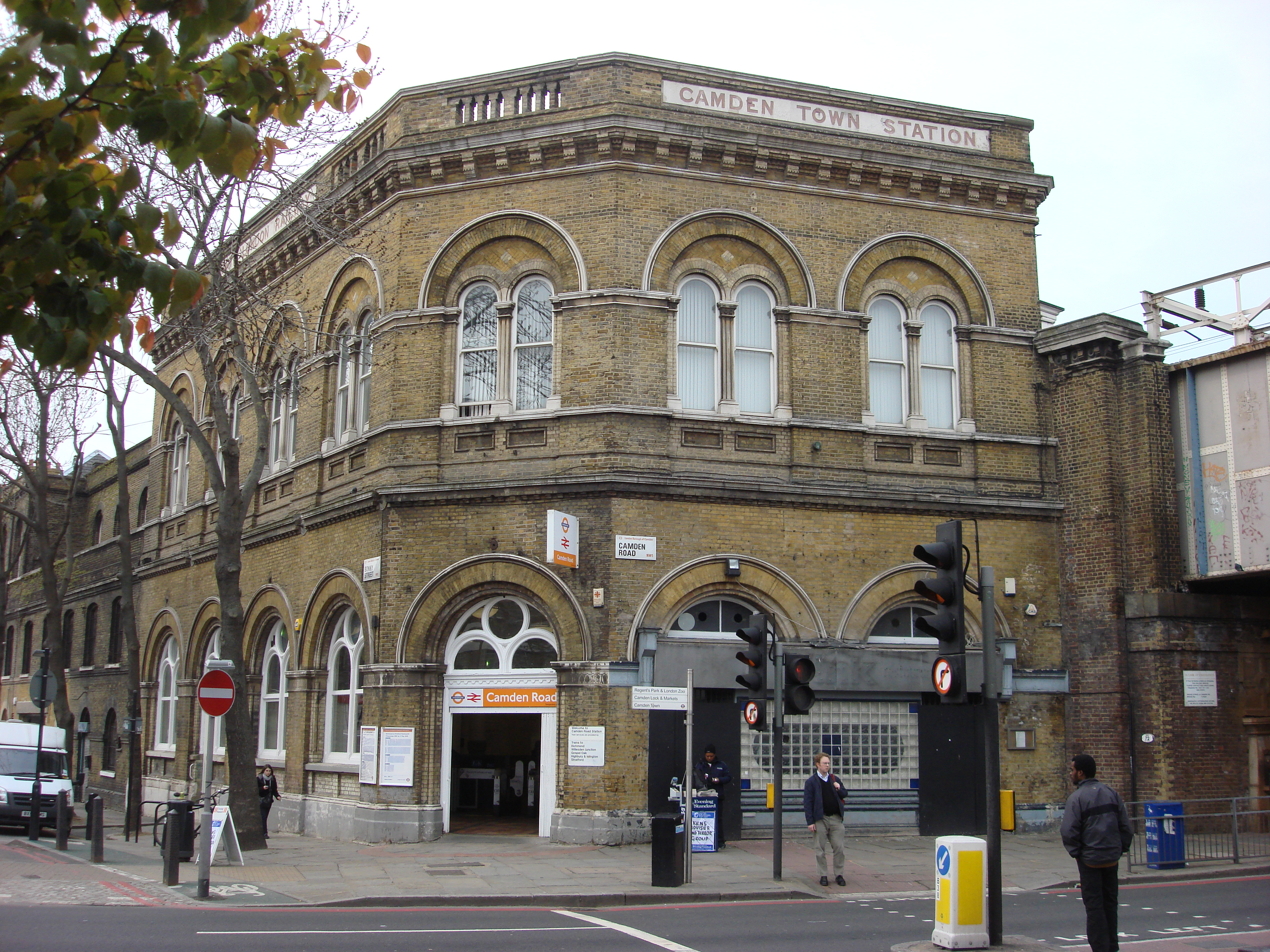
Camden Road Railway Station.

Opened in December 1870, Camden Town Station was built in Venetian Gothic style, in yellow Suffolk brick and Portland stone with terracotta dressings. The vast interior was enclosed by a mansard roof with iron cresting. The station was renamed Camden Road in 1950 to avoid confusion with the underground station. Heritage-listed as a Grade II building by Historic England, it is the last of Horne's stations still in use for its original purpose. The recently restored Hackney Station is now a music venue.

Bow Station

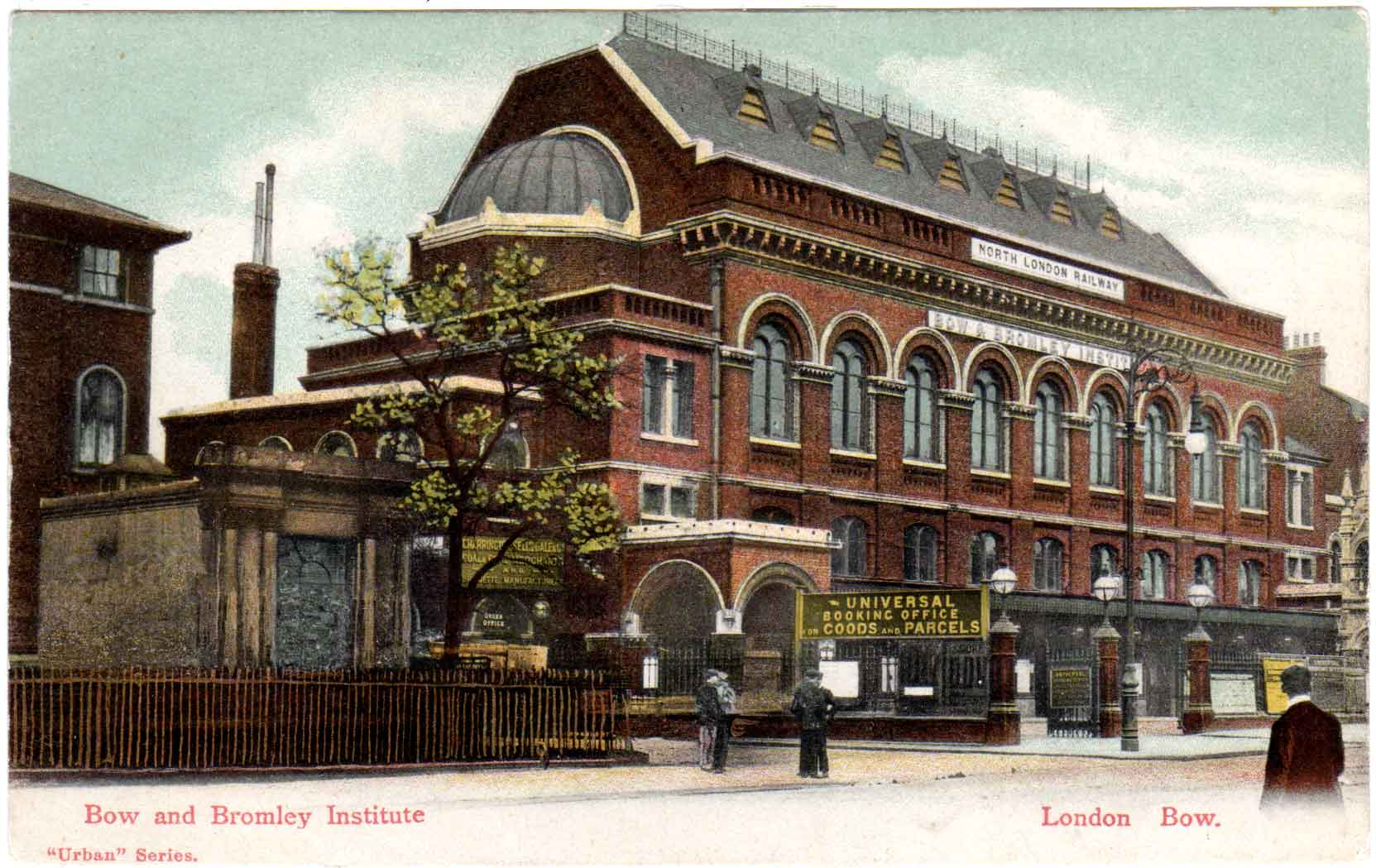
Bow and Bromley Institute c 1907

The substantial station at Bow was opened on 26 March 1870. The elegant facade featured simple round arches. At road level was a booking hall, waiting and refreshment rooms and on the upper floor was a spacious concert hall designed to seat 1,000 persons. On 2 September 1870 The Engineer published detailed illustrations of Bow station, naming Horne and including sectional drawings of the building as well as the frontage, concluding that "the building, is, in our opinion, as good an example of what a railway station should be as any we have ever seen".

St John's Church Ealing Dean

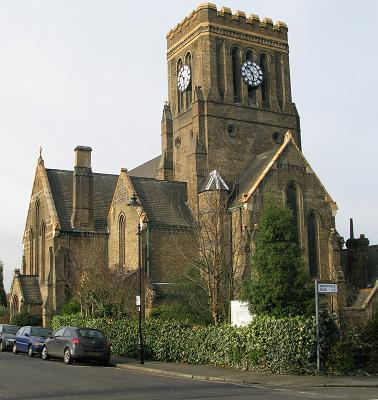
St John's Church Ealing

St John's Church was consecrated on 15 July 1876 and was large enough to seat 1,000 persons. The exterior architecture was described in The Annals of Ealing as French Gothic. The interior was regarded as striking, the proportions good and the architect was described as a man with original ideas and of no mean skill. On the night of 8 November 1920, a fire broke out in the church, gutting the interior. Only the bare walls were left standing. Despite costly restorations, the steeple was never replaced. The restored church was Grade II listed by English Heritage in 1981.

== Bibliography and further reading ==
- "The Illustrated London News" April 19, 1873
- British Listed Buildings English Heritage 1981 ID: 200967
- Listed Buildings Historic England 1244154
- Edith Jackson "Annals of Ealing" Phillimore & Co pub.1898
- British History Online. Ealing and Brentford.Churches Ealing.Originally published by Victoria County History, London 1982 pages 150-153
- Jim Connor "Lost Stations of East London" DVD London's Screen Archives
- Islington Gazette 8 September 2014 Article re rebuilding of façade of Highbury & Islington Station
