= Aldgate bus station =

Bus station in the City of London, England

Coordinates: 51°30′48″N 0°04′30″W

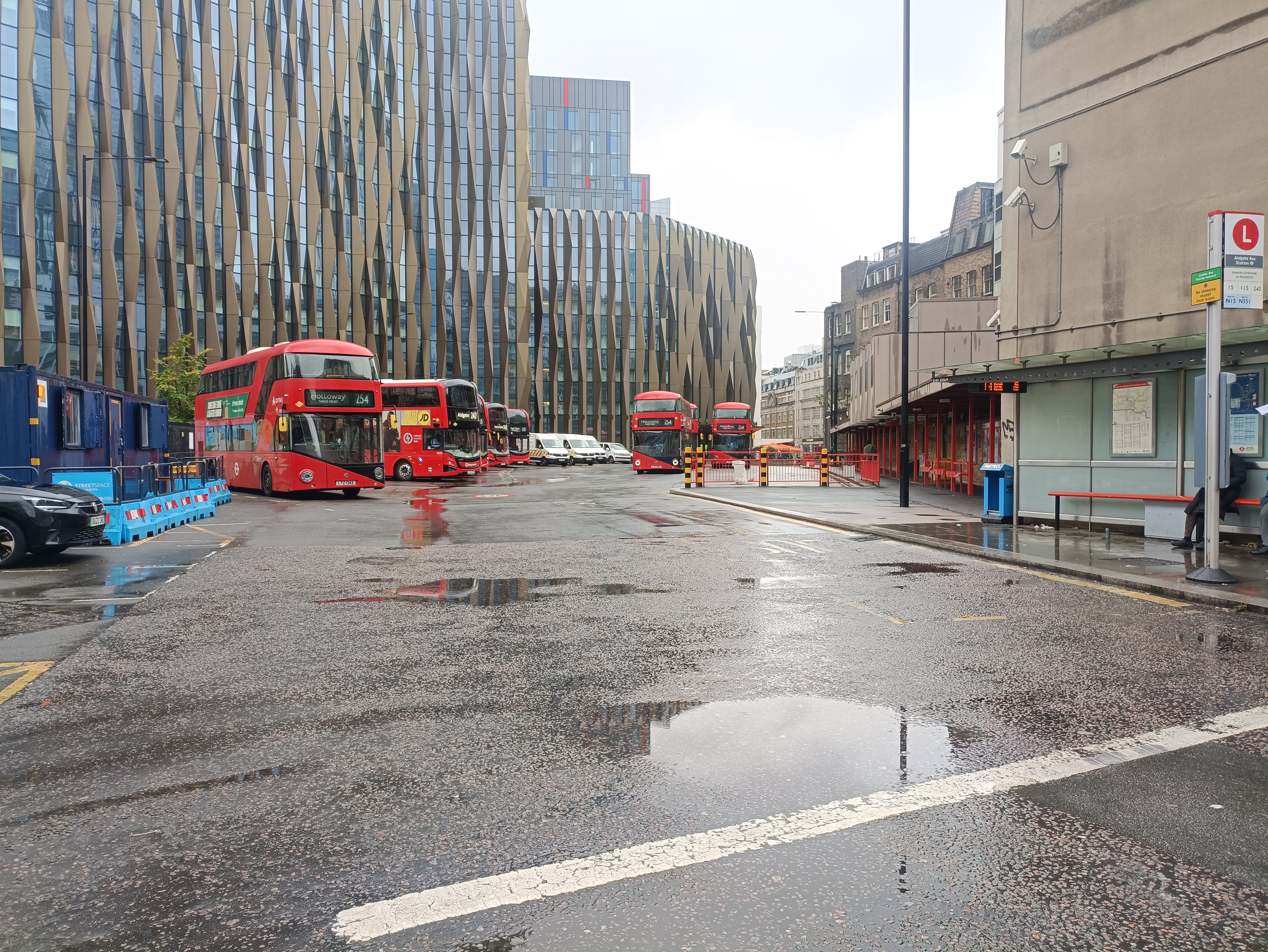
- The bus station in 2025

General information
- Location: Aldgate; City of London
- Operator: Transport for London
- Bus routes: 5
- Bus stands: 1
- Bus operators: Arriva London; Blue Triangle; Stagecoach London
- Connections: Aldgate tube station

History
- Opened: 1930s
Location

Aldgate bus station serves the Aldgate area of the City of London, England. The station is owned and maintained by Transport for London and located directly south of Aldgate tube station.

Also known as Minories bus station or lay-by, it was the first dedicated bus station in the City of London, and was formerly a major coach station and trolleybus terminal.

== Trolleybus terminal ==
The City of London Corporation prohibited trams and trolleybuses from entering the square mile - Aldgate was therefore used as a terminal on the edge of the city. Opened in the 1930s, by 1947 it was the busiest bus station in London with 1,358 departures a day. Trolleybus services ceased in 1961. In 1964 it was rebuilt as a bus and coach station.

== Green Line Coach Station ==
Aldgate was the base for Green Line Coaches serving Essex, while other Green Line routes operated out of Green Line Coach Station at Victoria.

== Recent history ==
In January 2015 the bus station closed in connection with adjoining roadworks. It reopened in April 2016.

The air rights from forty feet upwards above the bus station were transferred from BRB (Residuary) Limited on its abolition in 2013 to London and Continental Railways.

== Services ==
As at January 2020, it was served by five London Buses routes.
