= Privatisation of London bus services =

Transfer of bus operations in London from public bodies to private companies

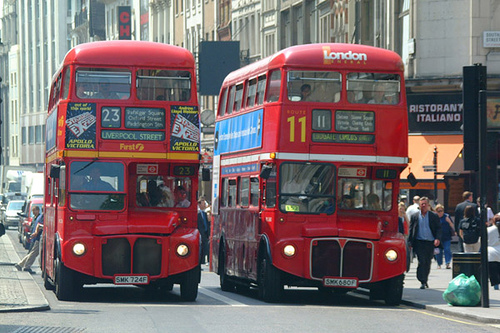
First London and London General AEC Routemasters on The Strand

The privatisation of London bus services was the process of the transfer of operation of buses in London from public bodies to private companies.

For half a century, operation of London bus services for public transport was under the direct control of a number of entities known as London Transport. The London Regional Transport Act 1984 resulted in London Regional Transport taking control of London's bus routes, with the operation divested in stand alone companies that were privatised in 1994/95.

Since then, direct provision of bus services in London has been run by private companies, although Transport for London did operate its own company, East Thames Buses between 1999 and 2009.

Unlike those in the rest of the United Kingdom, the bus services in London, although still ultimately privatised, were not deregulated to the same extent. In London, details of routes, fares and services levels were still specified by public bodies, with the right to run the services contracted to private companies on a tendered basis.

The privatised period produced for the first time buses in London painted in different schemes from the traditional red. This ceased following a 1997 edict that London buses be 80% red.

== Formation of London Buses ==
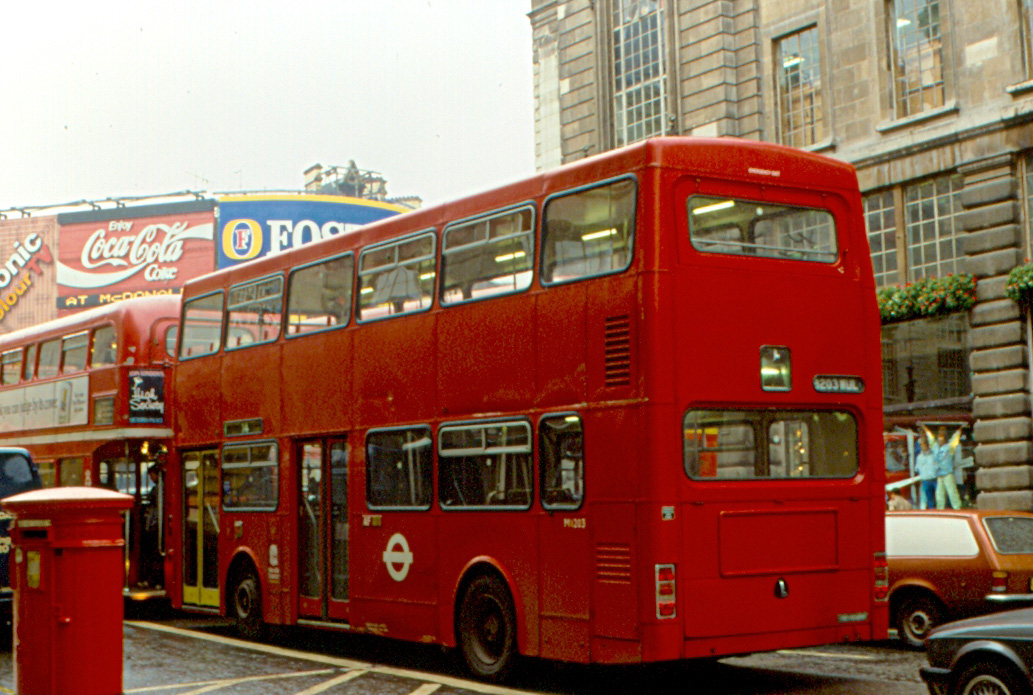
London Buses MCW Metrobus at Piccadilly Circus in October 1987

On 29 June 1984, in the general move towards deregulation, responsibility for running London bus services transferred from the last public body running London's buses, the Greater London Council to London Regional Transport under the London Regional Transport Act 1984. This Act required arm's-length subsidiaries to be established to oversee the operation of bus services. In March 1985, London Buses Limited was incorporated as an LRT subsidiary amid a wider split of LRT's operations.

The implementation of the Transport Act 1985 that deregulated bus services in England, Scotland and Wales did not apply to London Buses.

Initially, London Buses' fleet livery continued to be all-over red with a simple solid white roundel. In 1987, however, this was revised with the addition of a grey skirt and a white mid-level relief line; in the same year a modified red and yellow roundel designed by consultants Wolff Olins, featuring the name 'London Buses' in capitals through the centre of the roundel, was introduced.

== Introduction of competition ==
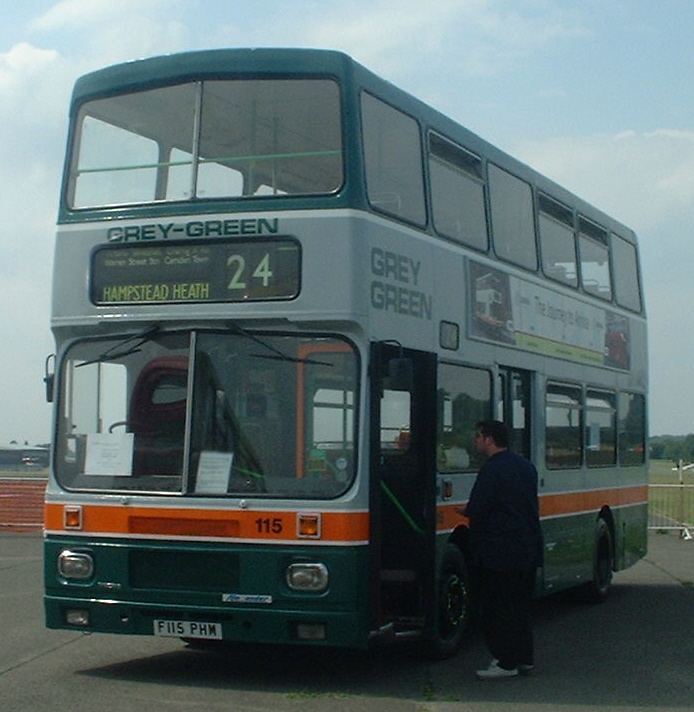
Grey-Green Alexander bodied Volvo Citybus as used on route 24

Under the 1984 Act, London bus services were to be tendered. The first round of tendering took place in the summer of 1985, bringing the first private operator into the market, in the form of London Buslines on route 81. By 1988 Boro'line Maidstone, Grey-Green and Metrobus were also operating numerous London routes.

Controversially, these operators were allowed to operate buses in liveries other than standard red, meaning that for the first time, it was possible for non-red buses to run into the centre of London, such as those on high-profile route 24 operated by Grey-Green. The only requirement was to display the London Transport roundel on the bus, to designate a London Transport tendered service. Ironically, several of the new private entrants were descendants of London Transport's former 'green' buses division, which operated outer London services that were passed to the National Bus Company's control as London Country Bus Services, in 1969.

The private competition was not without controversy, with objections to non-red buses leading to an edict in 1997 specifying 80% red liveries. The tendering also caused problems with several operators needing to hire buses due to late delivery of new buses for newly won routes.

One such controversial route was the arrangements for tendering route 60 which was initially awarded to Capital Logistics. Difficulties in setting up the route eventually saw operation by eight different operators and 10 different bus types in a short space of time, before the route finally gained a stable arrangement.

The collapse of Harris Bus in December 1999 led to London Transport forming East Thames Buses as an arm's-length company to provide temporary operation of the collapsed operator's routes. East Thames Buses was retained by the new Transport for London authority to tender for routes itself before being sold for £5 million (equivalent to £7,978,000 in 2025) in October 2009 to the Go-Ahead Group.

== Break-up of London Buses ==
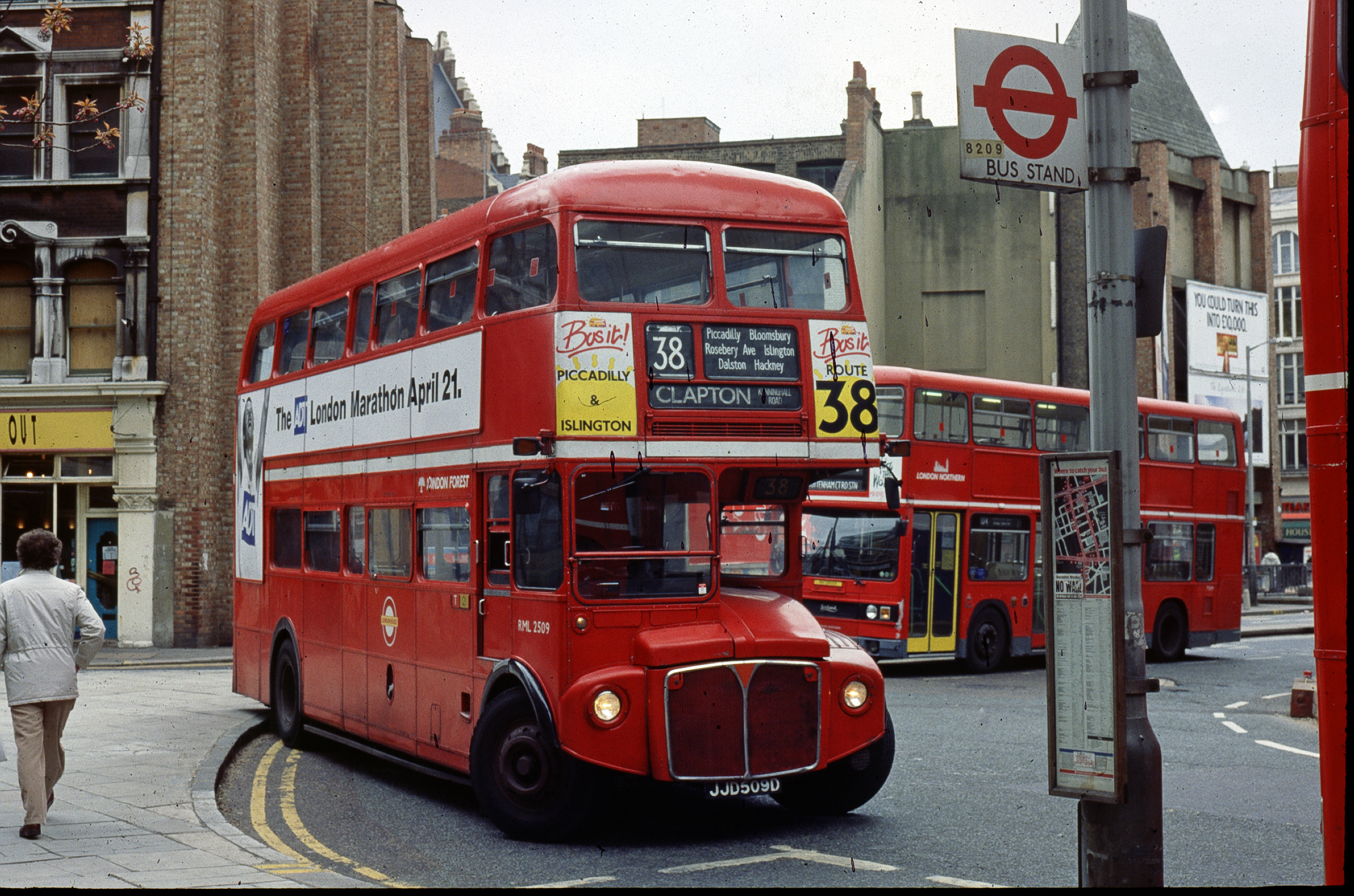
London Forest AEC Routemaster in 1991

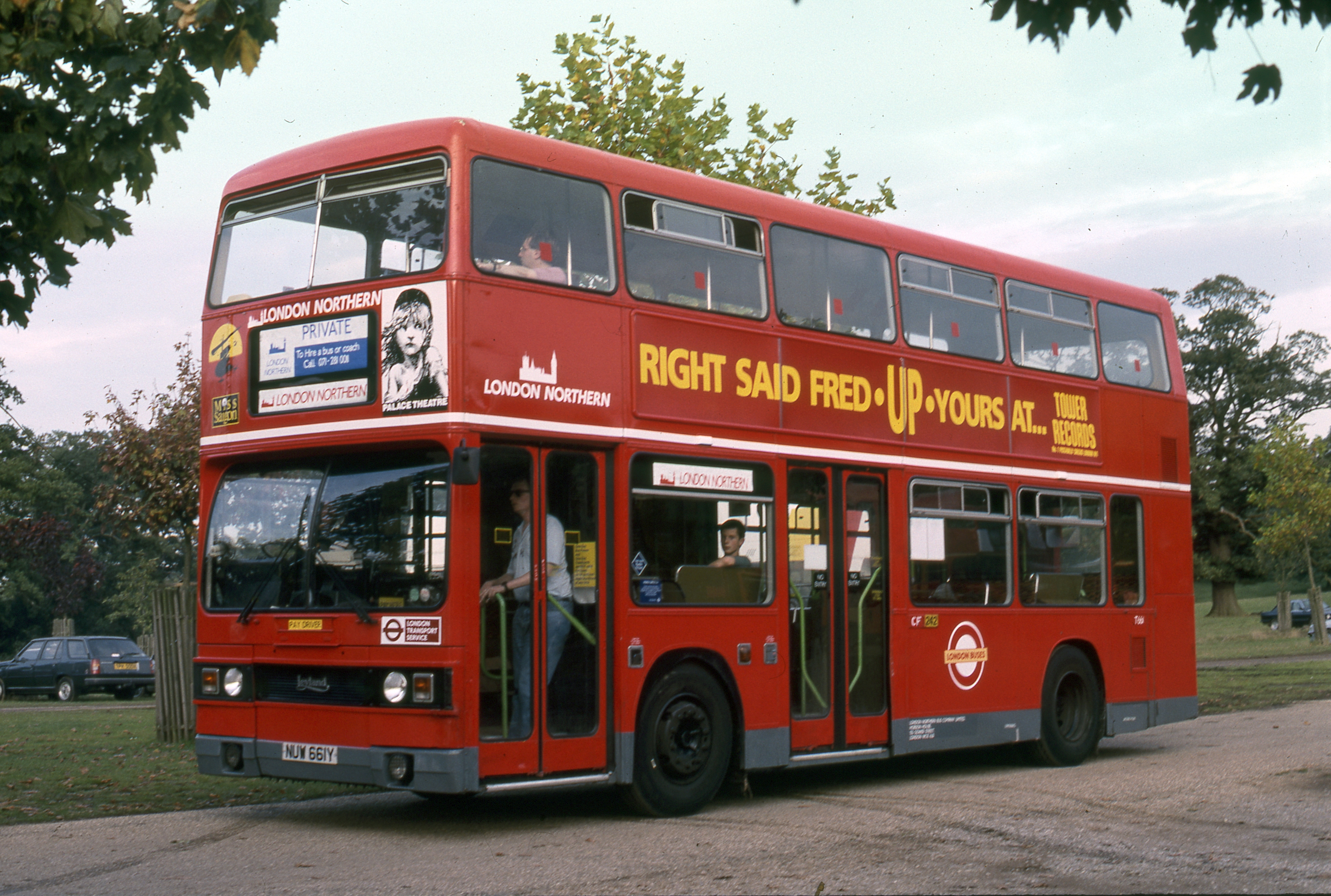
London Northern Leyland Titan in 1992

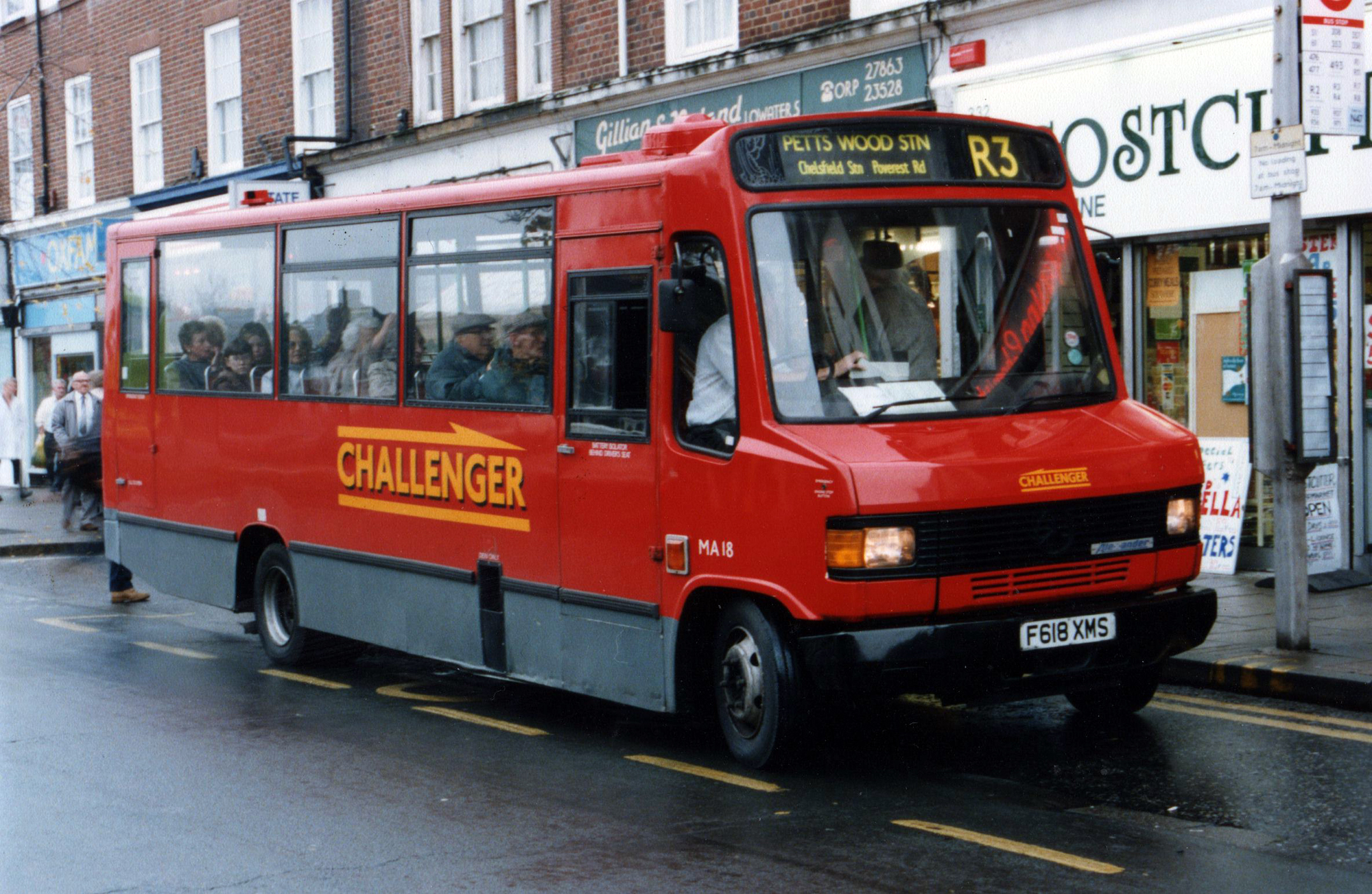
CentreWest Challenger Alexander bodied Mercedes-Benz

On 1 April 1989, London Buses was divided into 12 business units in preparation for being individually sold off. The companies were created along geographic lines, with all but Westlink having routes running into Central London. The division names and a small graphic device were added to the buses, in white. An exception to this was the Westlink unit, which received a new livery altogether. Some of the names chosen were drawn from the pre London Transport era, namely London General Omnibus Company and London United Tramways.

The separate business units created were:

Business unit	Area	Logo	Legal entity
CentreWest	West	Arrow †	CentreWest London Buses Limited
East London	East	Barge	East London Bus & Coach Company Limited
Leaside	River Lea	Swan	Leaside Bus Company Limited
London Central	South central	Ship	London Central Bus Company Limited
London Forest	Waltham Forest	Oak tree	London Forest Travel Limited
London General	Southwest	Omnibus	London General Transport Services Limited
London Northern	North	Parliament	London Northern Bus Company Limited
London United	Southwest	Crest	London United Busways Limited
Metroline	Northwest	Stripes	Metroline Travel Limited
Selkent	Southeast	Hops	South East London & Kent Bus Company Limited
South London	South	Tower Bridge	South London Transport Limited
Westlink	Kingston	n/a	Stanwell Buses Limited
London Coaches	Central London	n/a	London Coaches Limited

† Unlike the other units, Centrewest quickly branded its buses into separate groups, in the main removing the London Buses roundel in favour of various gold designs, with just the central services remaining in a slightly altered roundel based scheme. The group brands were: Challenger, Ealing Buses, Gold Arrow, Uxbridge Buses, Hillingdon local service and Orpington Buses.

=== Intermediate operation ===
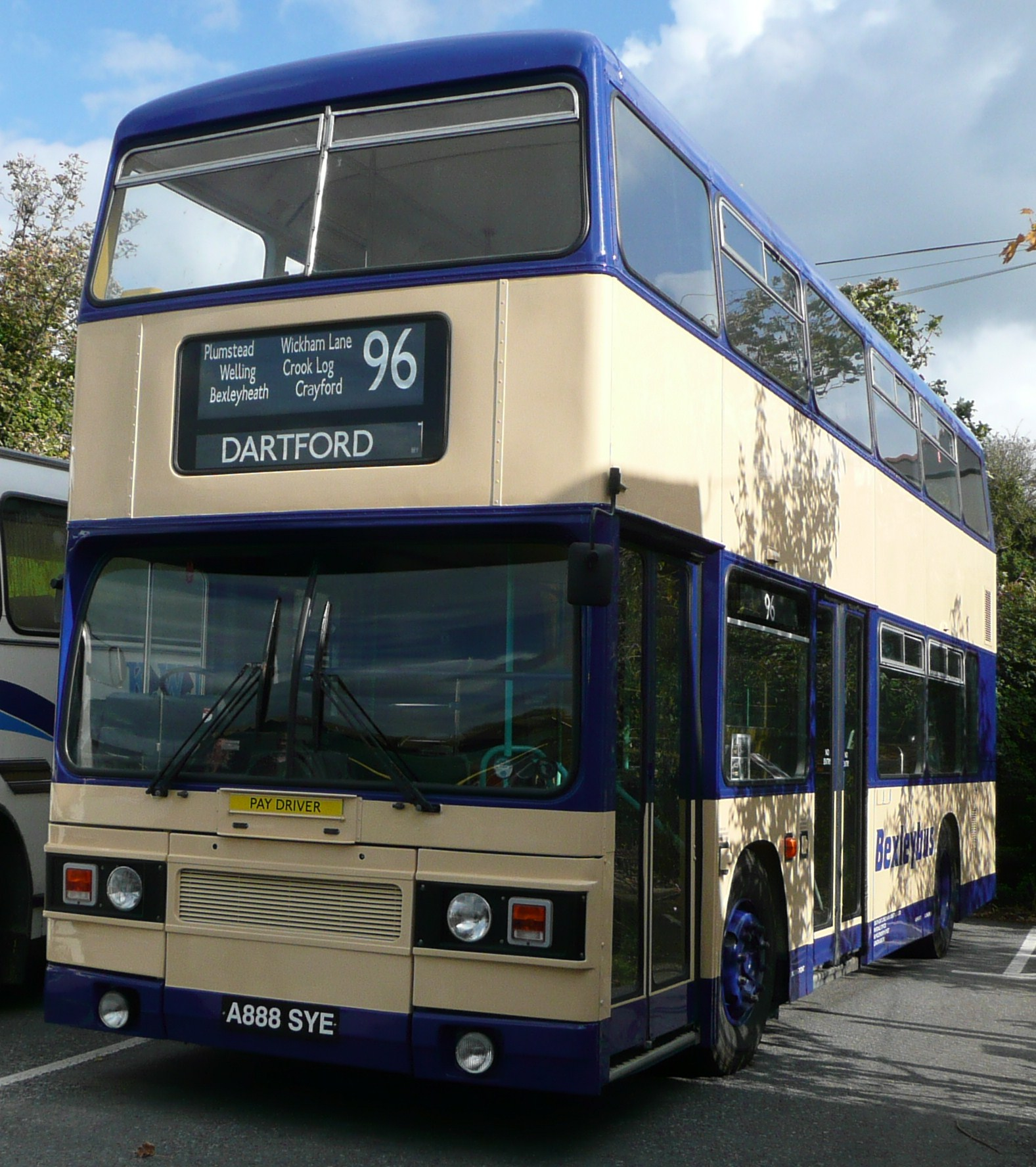
Preserved Bexleybus Leyland Titan

During this time of separate business unit operation by London Buses, many new bus types were also being introduced, notably the Dennis Dart midibus as well as numerous minibuses. Several of these new vehicles received specialist branding from normal unit liveries, such as Camden Link, Kingston Hoppa or Southall Shuttle.

In the new era of private tendering, in an effort to compete with the new private operators entering the market, London Buses set up some low cost units to compete for tenders, painted in non-red liveries. The most notable were Harrow Buses and Bexleybus, tendering for routes in the Harrow and Bexleyheath areas respectively.

These units were not overly successful, due to unreliable service, and industrial disputes due to lower pay rates than for the main London units. Their routes were quickly surrendered to other units or private operators.

== Proposed deregulation of routes ==
The implementation of the Transport Act 1985 that deregulated bus services in England, Scotland and Wales did not apply to London Buses. Despite this, the Government desired to deregulate bus routes in London, to allow for full competition on individual bus routes; the Conservative Party manifesto at the 1992 general election proposed "Deregulating buses in London and privatising the London Buses subsidiaries".

In March 1991, the Government published "A Bus Strategy for London", outlining its proposals for deregulation of bus routes in London. A "London Bus Executive" was proposed, providing socially essential but uneconomic bus routes, as well as bus stops, shelters and stations. This would be separate from London Regional Transport, as it was felt that an independent body would not be "distracted by the major challenges which London Transport faces".

The Government claimed that deregulation would lead to more and varied bus services, leading to increased bus ridership, less congestion and better choice of services for passengers. Criticism of those against deregulation included the potential of traffic congestion caused by multiple operators competing on popular bus routes (especially in Central London), the potential that bus operators would not use the popular Travelcard scheme, as well as the loss of strategic transport planning from an overarching body like London Transport. In July 1991, Minister of State for Public Transport Roger Freeman stated in the House of Commons that 60% of respondents to the consultation were against the proposal.

In November 1993, the Government deferred the proposed deregulation of buses in London, noting that the sell-off of London Buses business units would continue. It remained an aspiration of the Conservative Government to deregulate London bus services in future. Following the election of Tony Blair and the Labour Party following the 1997 general election, deregulation of London bus services was no longer pursued. Bus routes therefore continued to be tendered by London Transport and post 2000, its successor, Transport for London.

In 2024, Mayor of London Sadiq Khan pledged to bring bus routes back into public ownership as contracts expire.

== Business unit sell-off ==
Between September 1994 and January 1995, the separate London Buses business units were sold off. Competition rules restricted the number of units that could be bought by one group. All the units were sold either via a management buyout or employee buyout, or to one of the emerging national bus groups that had been growing through acquisition of deregulated companies in the rest of the UK. The exception was London Northern, which was bought by MTL, itself an expanding company formed from the privatisation of the Merseyside Passenger Transport Executive bus company.

Following sell-off, the new operators introduced new liveries, logos and trading names to many of the business units. Initially some buses appeared in liveries other than red, but an edict that all buses be 80% red saw this reversed from 1997. Some companies having been renamed, have since resumed their original identities.

The only unit not to be sold off was London Forest, which was wound up in the autumn of 1991 following poor financial performance and industrial action; its operating area was subsequently taken up by East London and Leaside Buses, although 11 of its routes in the Walthamstow area passed to private operators Capital Citybus, Thamesway Buses and County Bus.

The sell-off of the units proceeded as follows:

Division	Buyer	Subsequent fate
CentreWest	Management	sold to FirstGroup in March 1997 and rebranded as First CentreWest and later as First London, sold to Metroline & Tower Transit in June 2013
East London	Stagecoach	rebranded as Stagecoach London in November 2000, sold to Macquarie Bank in August 2006, re-acquired by Stagecoach in October 2010
Leaside	Cowie Group	rebranded as Arriva London North in April 1998
London Central	Go-Ahead Group	no change
London General	Management	sold to Go-Ahead Group in May 1996
London Northern	MTL	sold to Metroline in July 1998, which in turn was sold to ComfortDelGro in March 2000
London United	Management	sold to Transdev in July 1997 and later rebranded as Transdev London, sold to RATP Group in March 2011 and resumed London United identity
Metroline	Management	sold to ComfortDelGro in March 2000
Selkent	Stagecoach	rebranded as Stagecoach London in November 2000, sold to Macquarie Bank in August 2006, re-acquired by Stagecoach in October 2010
South London	Cowie Group	rebranded as Arriva London South in April 1998
Westlink	Employees	sold to West Midlands Travel in 1994, then London United in September 1995
London Coaches	Management	sold to Arriva in 1997, rebranded as The Original Tour

== List of independent operators ==
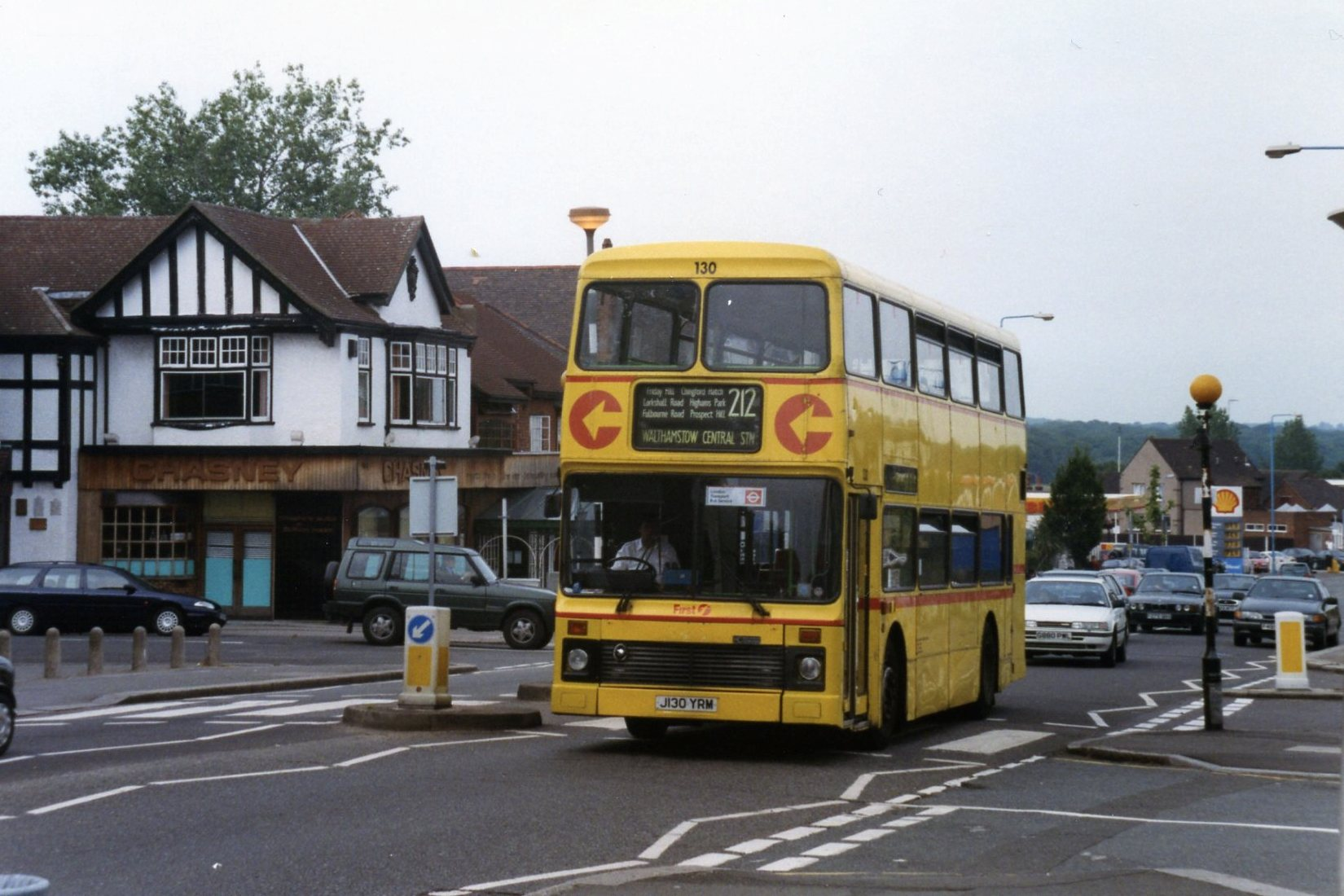
Capital Citybus Northern Counties bodied Leyland Olympian at Chingford station in June 1999

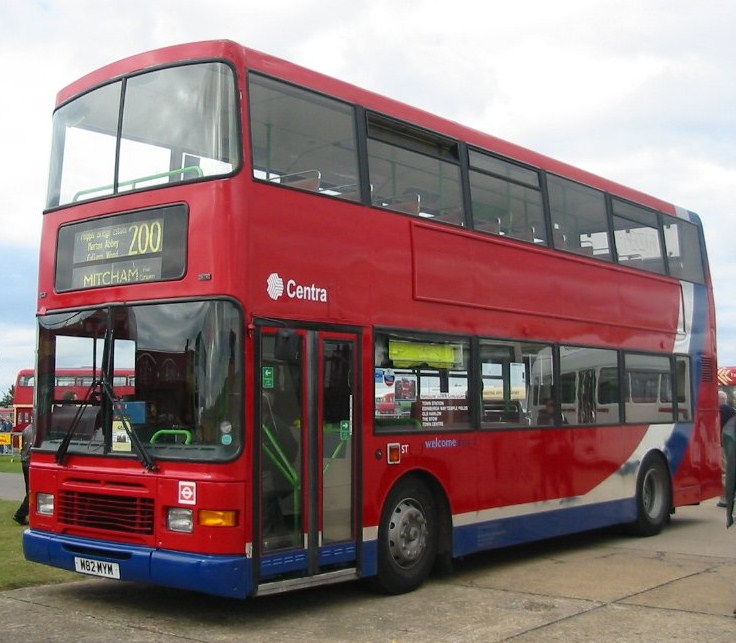
Centra Alexander Royale bodied Volvo Olympian

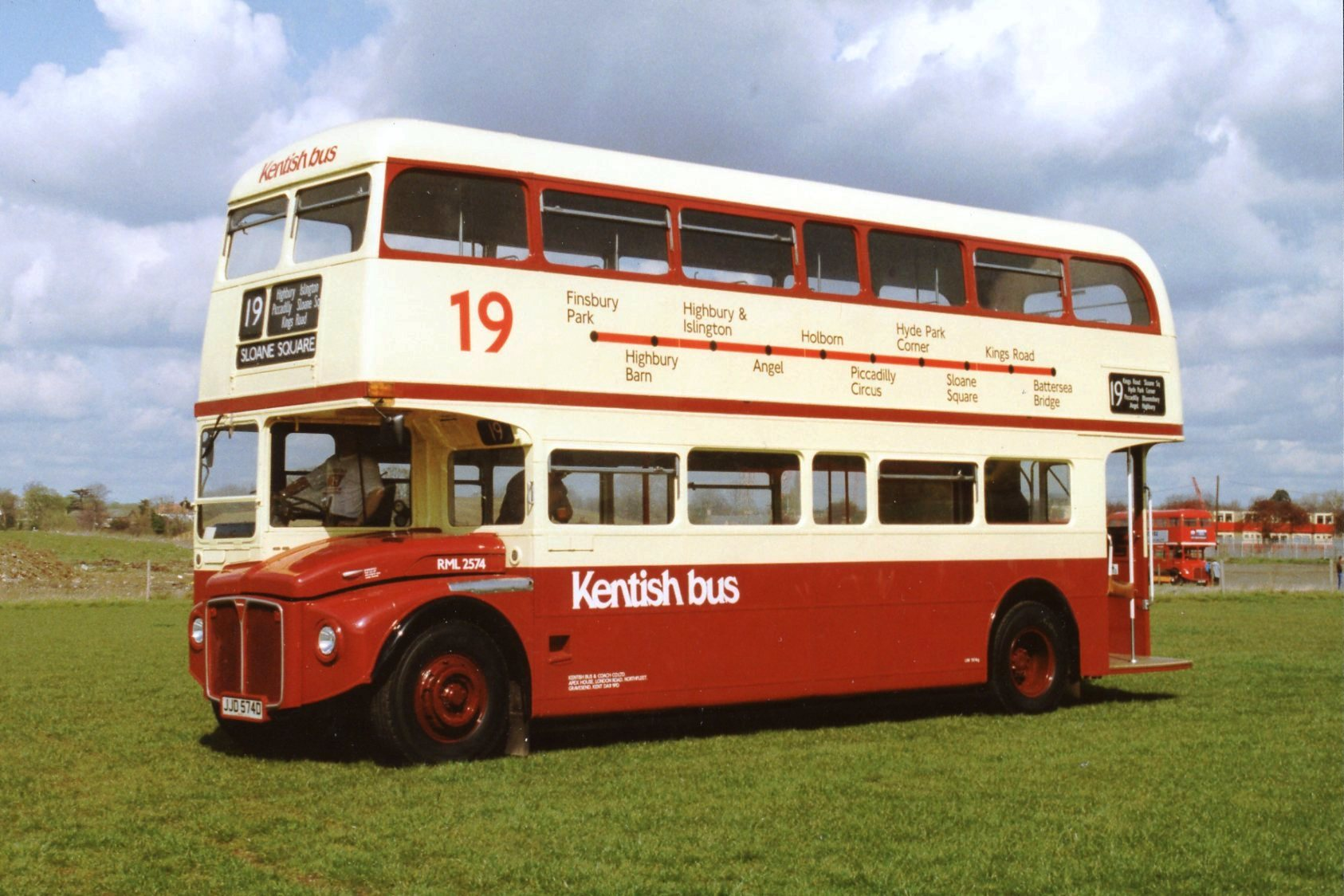
Kentish Bus AEC Routemaster in July 1993

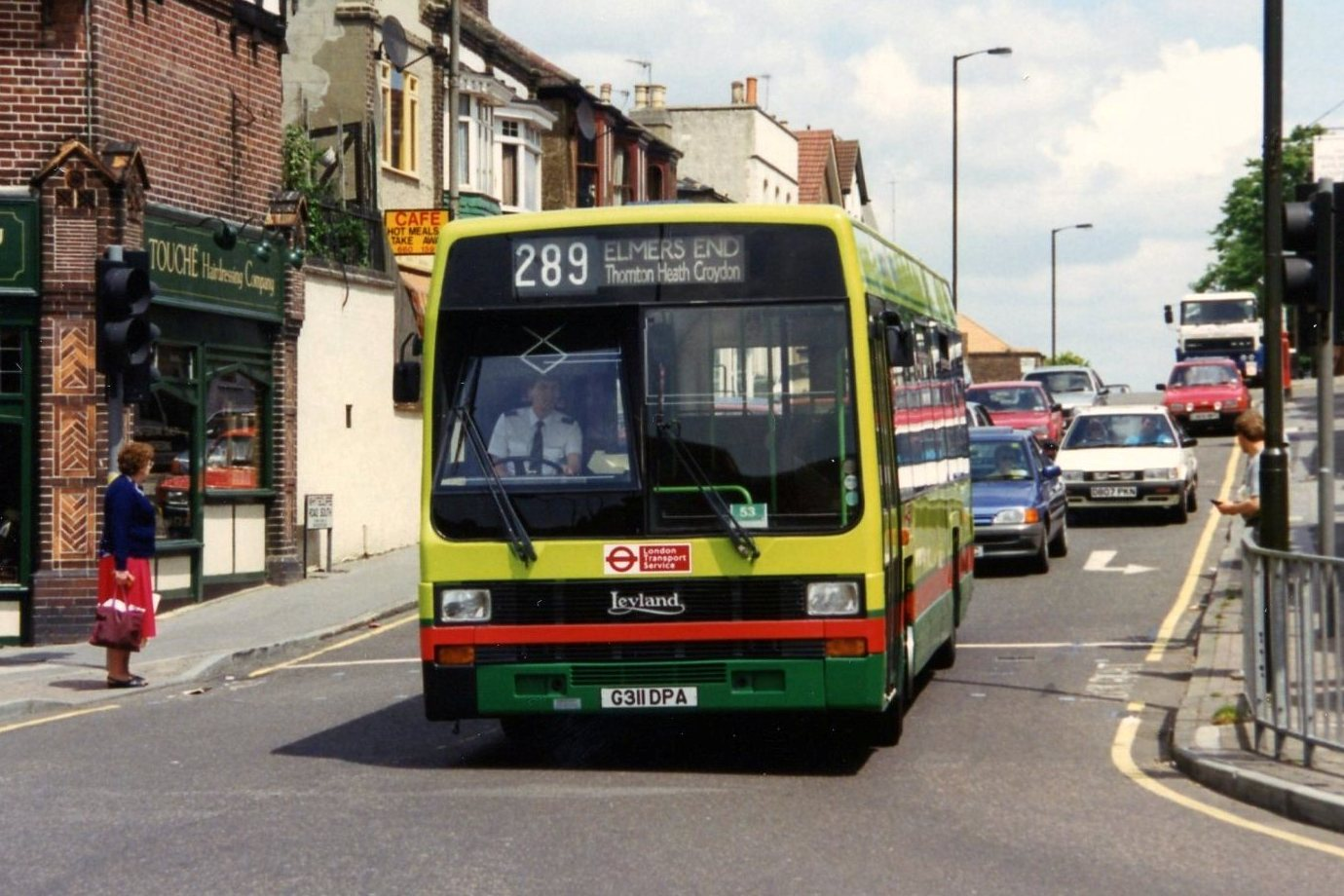
London & Country Leyland Lynx in Purley in May 1993

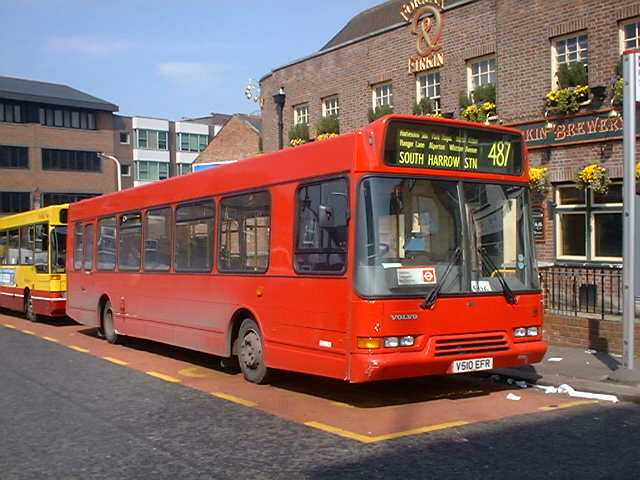
London Traveller East Lancs Spryte bodied Volvo B6BLE in August 1999

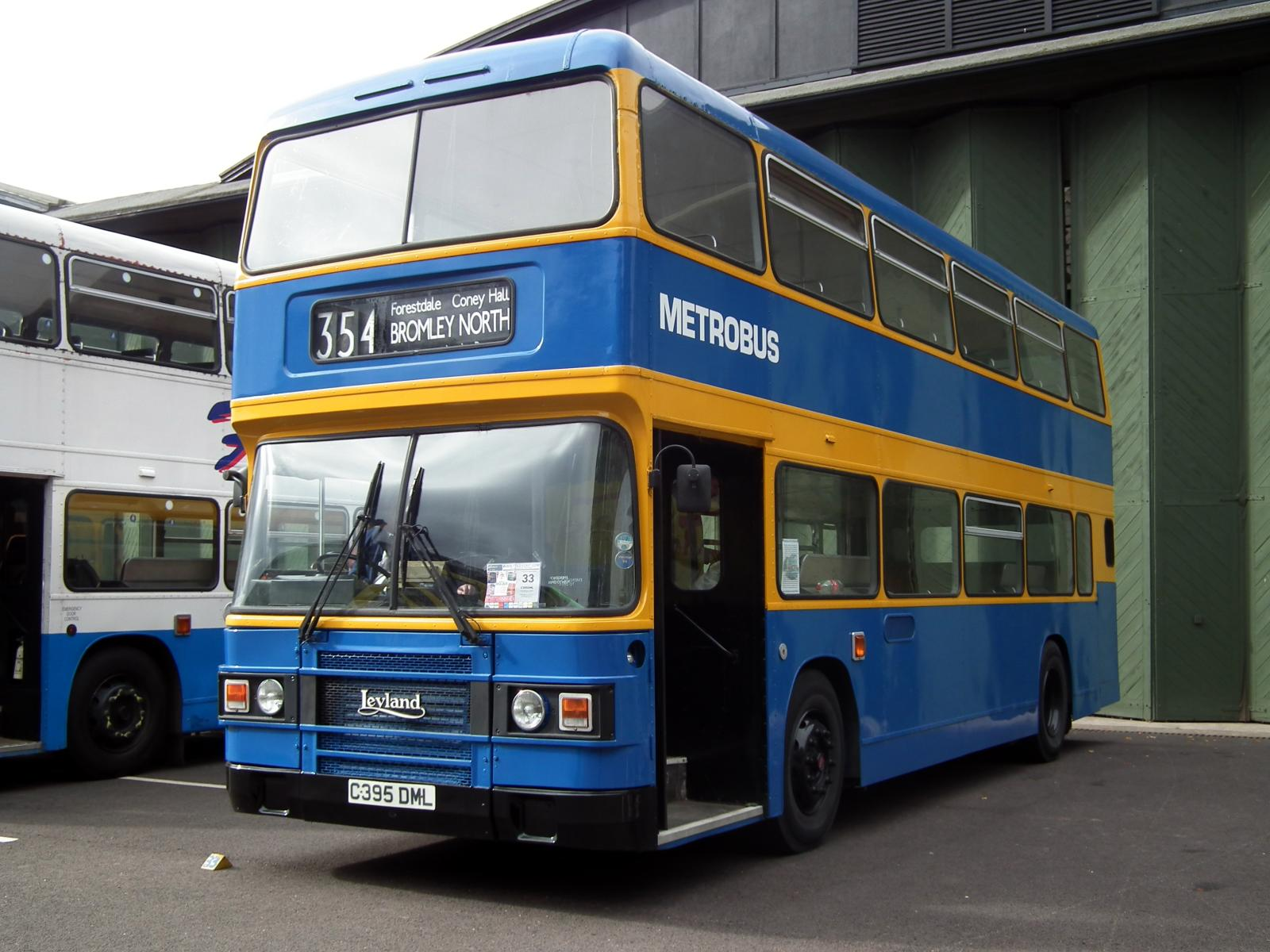
Preserved Metrobus Leyland Olympian

In the period before the sell off of the main business units, London saw operation by several private companies who gained tenders for routes. Many of these either ceased trading, or were ultimately purchased by large groups, some of which also bought some of the ex-London Buses units. Below is a list of private operators, some of which still operate.

- Armchair Passenger Transport, acquired by Metroline in November 2004
- Atlas Bus & Coach, acquired by London Coaches in July 1994, resold to Metroline in November 1994
- Blue Triangle, London operations acquired by Go-Ahead Group in June 2007
- Boro'line London operations acquired by Kentish Bus
- Borehamwood Travel Services acquired by Blazefield Group in 1994 and renamed London Sovereign, later rebranded as Transdev London, sold to RATP Group in March 2014 and resumed London Sovereign identity
- Capital Citybus purchased by FirstGroup in July 1998 and rebranded as First Capital and later as First London, acquired by Tower Transit in June 2013
- Capital Connections
- Capital Logistics, acquired by Tellings-Golden Miller in June 1999
- Carousel Buses, acquired by Go-Ahead Group in March 2012
- Centra ceased in May 2006
- Cityrama, sightseeing company acquired by Ensignbus
- Connex, sold to National Express in February 2004 and rebranded as Travel London
- Connexions
- Crystals, Dartford based operator acquired by Tellings-Golden Miller
- CT Plus
- Docklands Buses, acquired by Go-Ahead Group in September 2006
- Ealing Community Transport
- Ensignbus, London operations sold to Hong Kong Citybus and renamed Ensign Citybus, then Capital Citybus
- Frontrunner, London operations sold to Ensignbus
- Grey-Green, Arriva subsidiary, integrated into Arriva London
- Harris Bus, ceased trading in December 1999, operations taken over by London Buses subsidiary East Thames Buses
- Kentish Bus (originally London Country South East), now part of Arriva Kent Thameside
- Lea Valley, Hoddesdon based operations of County Bus (now Arriva East Herts & Essex)
- Limebourne, acquired by Connex in July 2001
- London Buslines, purchased by FirstGroup and integrated into First CentreWest
- London Coaches, London operations acquired by Metroline in November 1994, other operations acquired by Arriva in December 1997
- London Country North West, acquired by Luton & District Transport
- London Country North East, divided into County Bus and Sovereign Bus & Coach
- London Easylink, ceased trading August 2002 operations taken over by London Buses subsidiary East Thames Buses
- LondonLinks, merger of London operations of London & Country and Kentish Bus
- London & Country (originally London Country South West), now Arriva Guildford & West Surrey
- London Sovereign, sold by Blazefield Group to Transdev and rebranded as Transdev London sold to RATP Group in March 2014 and resumed London Sovereign identity
- London Suburban, acquired by MTL
- London Traveller, purchased by Thorpes
- Luton & District Transport, now Arriva Shires & Essex
- Metrobus, acquired by Go-Ahead Group in September 1999
- Mitcham Belle, acquired by Centra in August 2004
- NCP Challenger, renamed NSL Buses, acquired by Transdev London in November 2009
- Nostalgiabus
- Quality Line, acquired by RATP Group in April 2012
- R&I Coaches, acquired by MTL in June 1996
- Sampson Coaches, Hoddesdon based operator acquired by County Bus & Coach in February 1989
- Scanbus
- Southdown PSV
- Sullivan Buses
- Tellings-Golden Miller, London operations sold to Travel London in June 2005, remaining Tellings-Golden Miller operations sold to Arriva in December 2007, became a Transport for London operator again in June 2014
- Thames bus
- Thameside, Grays based operations of County Bus & Coach (now Arriva Shires & Essex), later transferred to Arriva Southern Counties
- Thamesway Buses (Eastern National Omnibus Company), now part of First Essex
- Thorpes acquired by Metroline in November 2004
- Timebus
- Town Link, Harlow based operations of County Bus & Coach (now Arriva East Herts & Essex)
- Town & Country
- Travel London, acquired by Abellio in May 2009 and rebranded Abellio London
- Wings Buses, Hayes based operator acquired by Tellings-Golden Miller
