= Keith Bright =

Transport executive in London (1931–2021)

Sir Keith Bright
- Born: 30 August 1931
- Died: 20 January 2021
- Occupation: Chairman of London Transport Executive: 1982–1984 Chairman of London Regional Transport: 1984–1988

Sir Keith Bright (30 August 1931 – 20 January 2021) was Chairman of London Regional Transport in the 1980s. He resigned following the Fennell Report into the King's Cross fire in 1988, that criticised the management of London Underground and London Transport.

== Biography ==
Graduating from the University of London, Bright worked for a wide variety of companies including Formica, Sime Darby and Associated Biscuits.

=== London Transport ===
Bright was headhunted by the Greater London Council (GLC) to lead London Transport, despite having no experience in the transportation industry. He was appointed Chairman of the London Transport Executive (LTE) in 1982. Underground ridership was declining, and efforts to reduce costs by cutting service, increasing ticket prices or cutting staff were blocked by Unions and the GLC – led by Ken Livingstone.

Following political rows between the Conservative government and the GLC, the London Regional Transport Act 1984 removed the transport powers of the GLC, with LTE becoming London Regional Transport. Bright remained as chairman, reporting directly to the Secretary of State for Transport. Improvements such as the Travelcard, automatic ticket machines and more night buses helped to improve service and increase revenue. Expenditure was also cut, with job losses due to the privatisation of London bus services. The requirement of taxpayer support was halved to £95m a year, 2 years ahead of schedule. By 1987, the Underground was 40% busier than its 1982 low – with future plans for transport improvements such as the Docklands Light Railway and the Jubilee Line Extension well underway. In 1987, Bright was knighted for services to London Transport.

==== Kings Cross fire ====
In 1987, a major fire at King's Cross Underground station killed 31 people. Following the fire, Bright offered to resign; however, Transport Secretary Paul Channon requested Bright to stay as chairman throughout the subsequent public inquiry. During the inquiry, Bright was criticised for suggesting that an arsonist was to blame for the fire. In 1988, the Fennell Report into the fire was published, which revealed serious issues with the safety of the Underground and its management culture. Both Bright and Tony Ridley (Chairman of London Underground) resigned. He was replaced on an caretaker basis by Sir Neil Shields (1988–89), and then by Sir Wilfrid Newton. London Regional Transport subsequently paid Bright £34,000.

=== Subsequent career ===
After his resignation from London Transport, Bright became chairman of Electrocomponents. Further chairperson and directorship positions followed including Chelsea and Westminster Hospital NHS Foundation Trust, British Airports Authority and Brent Walker.

=== Later years and death ===
After several years with Alzheimer's disease, Bright died in January 2021 from COVID-19, aged 89. Bright was survived by his wife Margot and their daughter Octavia, as well as a son and daughter from his first marriage.

In July 2023, Octavia published a memoir, This Ragged Grace: On Recovery and Renewal, about her relationship with her father in his later years living with dementia.

== See also ==
- List of heads of public transport authorities in London
