= London Buses route 96 =

London bus route

96
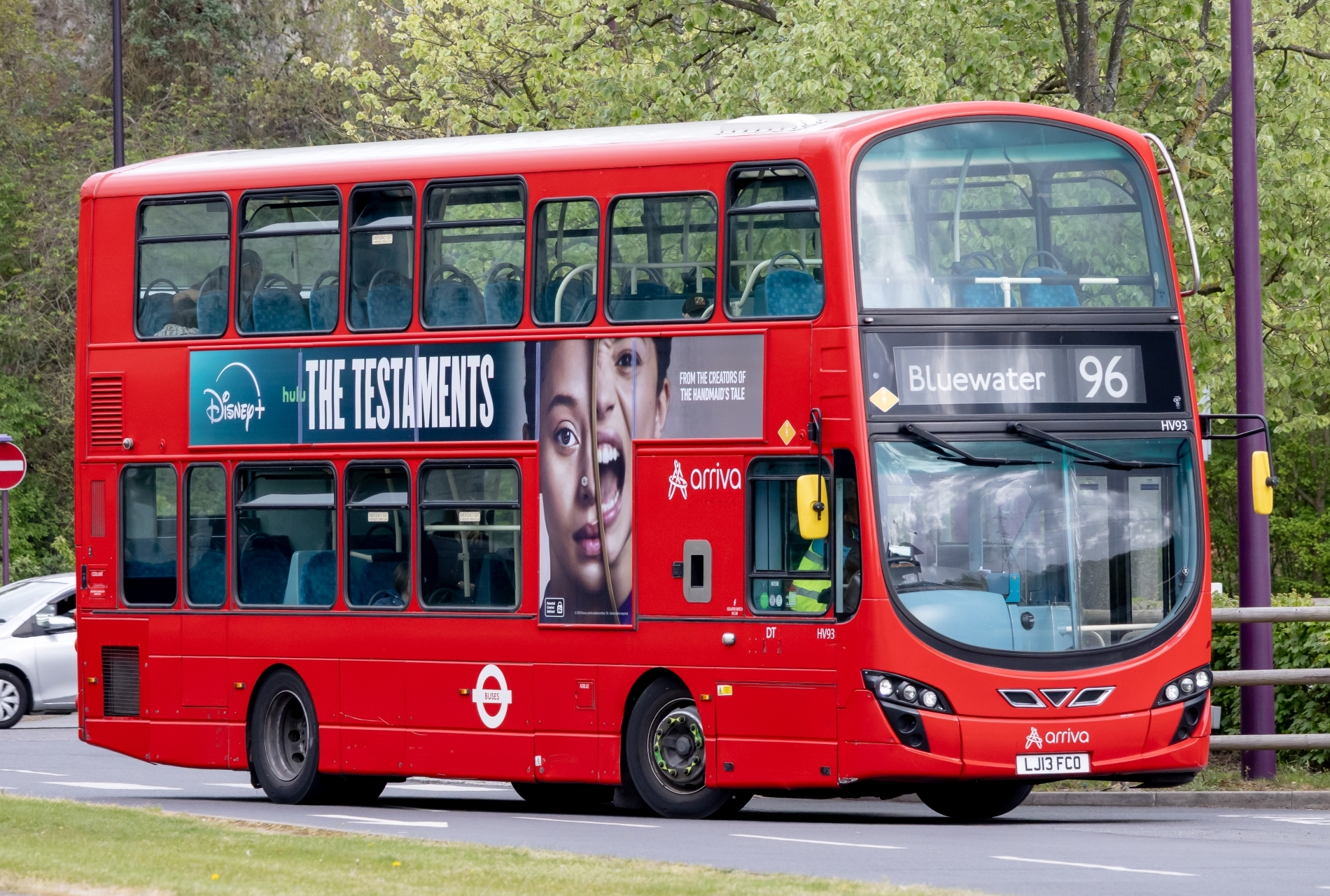
- Arriva London Wright Eclipse Gemini 2 bodied Volvo B5LH at Bluewater Shopping Centre in April 2026

Overview
- Operator: Arriva London
- Garage: Dartford
- Vehicle: Volvo B5LH Wright Eclipse Gemini 2 Volvo B5LH Wright Gemini 3
- Peak vehicle requirement: 24
- Began service: 4 March 1959
- Predecessors: Trolleybus Route 696
- Former operators: Selkent; Kentish Bus; Bexleybus; London Regional Transport; London Transport Executive
- Night-time: No night service

Route
- Start: Bluewater Shopping Centre
- Via: Dartford; Crayford; Bexleyheath; Welling; East Wickham; Plumstead
- End: Woolwich
- Length: 13 miles (21 km)

Service
- Level: Daily
- Frequency: About every 8-15 minutes
- Journey time: 40-77 minutes
- Operates: 04:30 until 01:08

London Buses route 96 is a Transport for London contracted bus route in London and Kent, England. Running between Bluewater Shopping Centre and Woolwich, it is operated by Arriva London.

== History ==
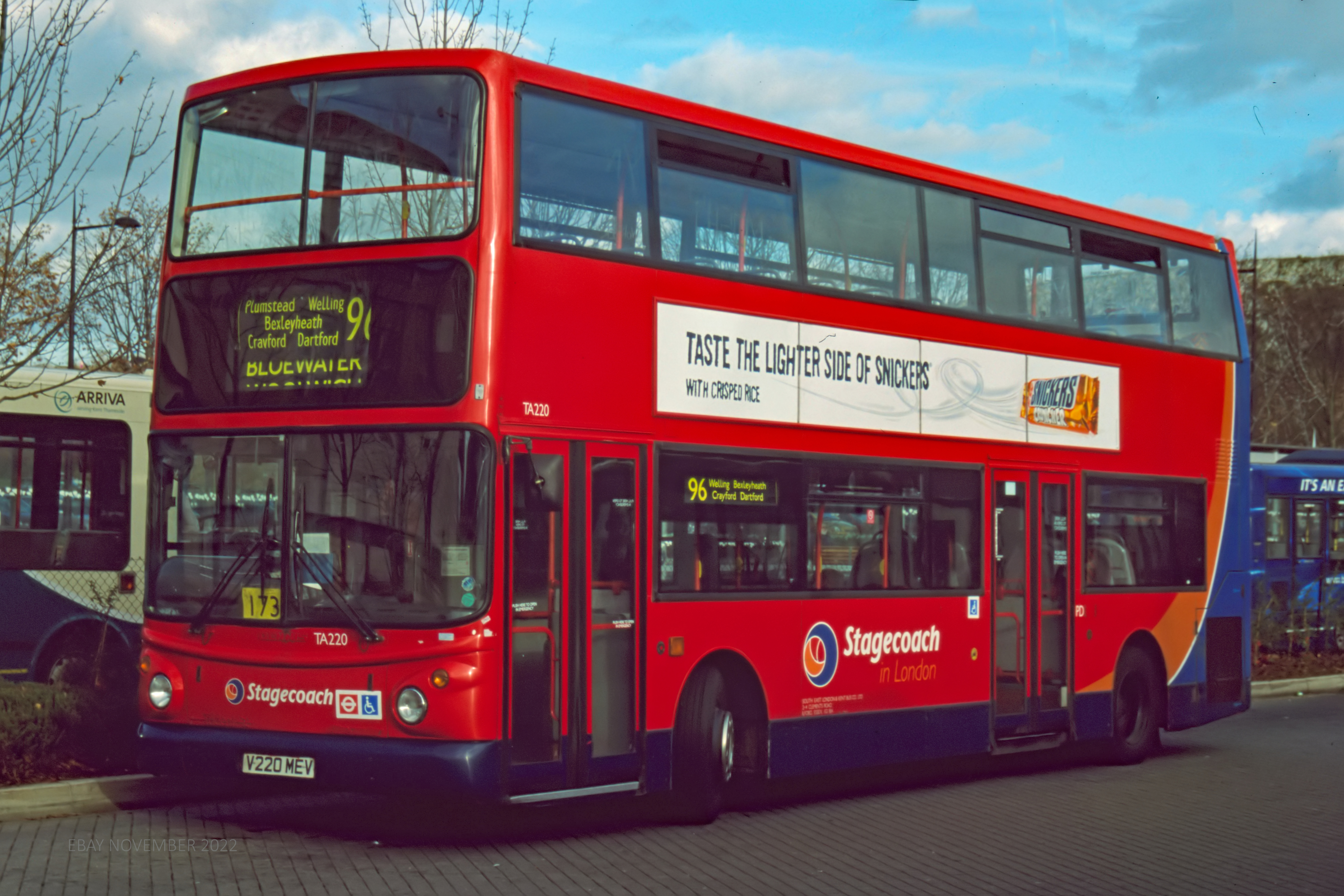
A Dennis Trident 2 double-decker bus operated on route 96 at Bluewater bus station, November 2002

Route 96 was a tram line running between Woolwich and Dartford. On 10 November 1935, it was replaced, along with several other tram routes, by trolleybus route 696 operating out of Bexleyheath garage. Route 696 was replaced by motor bus route 96 on 4 March 1959. It was extended from Dartford to Bluewater Shopping Centre on 16 March 1999. It was rerouted along Watling Street to serve Darent Valley Hospital on 14 December 2000. Because this stretch is outside Greater London, it runs express between these points, only stopping at Darent Valley Hospital in between.

On 31 July 2006, a Dennis Trident 2 Alexander ALX400 operating route 96 bound for Bluewater caught fire in Dartford. On 30 October 2013, a report from the London Assembly found the route to be among the ten most crowded in London.

There were proposals in June 2011 to alter the route to run via Darent Valley Hospital. However, this change was delayed as it was deemed necessary to use the Fastrack Busway, and Kent County Council had refused to allow route 96 to use it. The route alteration was finally implemented on 16 December 2017.

Having been operated by Bexleybus and Kentish Bus, it was then operated by Selkent out of Plumstead garage from 23 January 1999 to 24 January 2026.

On 18 July 2025, Arriva London was awarded as the new operator of route 96. Operations transferred on 24 January 2026.

== Current route ==
Route 96 operates via these primary locations:

- Bluewater Shopping Centre
- Darent Valley Hospital
- Dartford station
- Crayford
- Bexleyheath town centre
- Crook Log
- Welling
- East Wickham
- Plumstead station
- Woolwich station
- Woolwich Arsenal station
- Woolwich

Between Dartford and Bluewater, route 96 operates as an express service, only stopping at Darent Valley Hospital in between.

== Previous use ==
The 96 route number has also been used for a non-related route in Chelsea. This route was withdrawn in the late 1950s.
