= Bexleybus =

Bus operator in the London Borough of Bexley

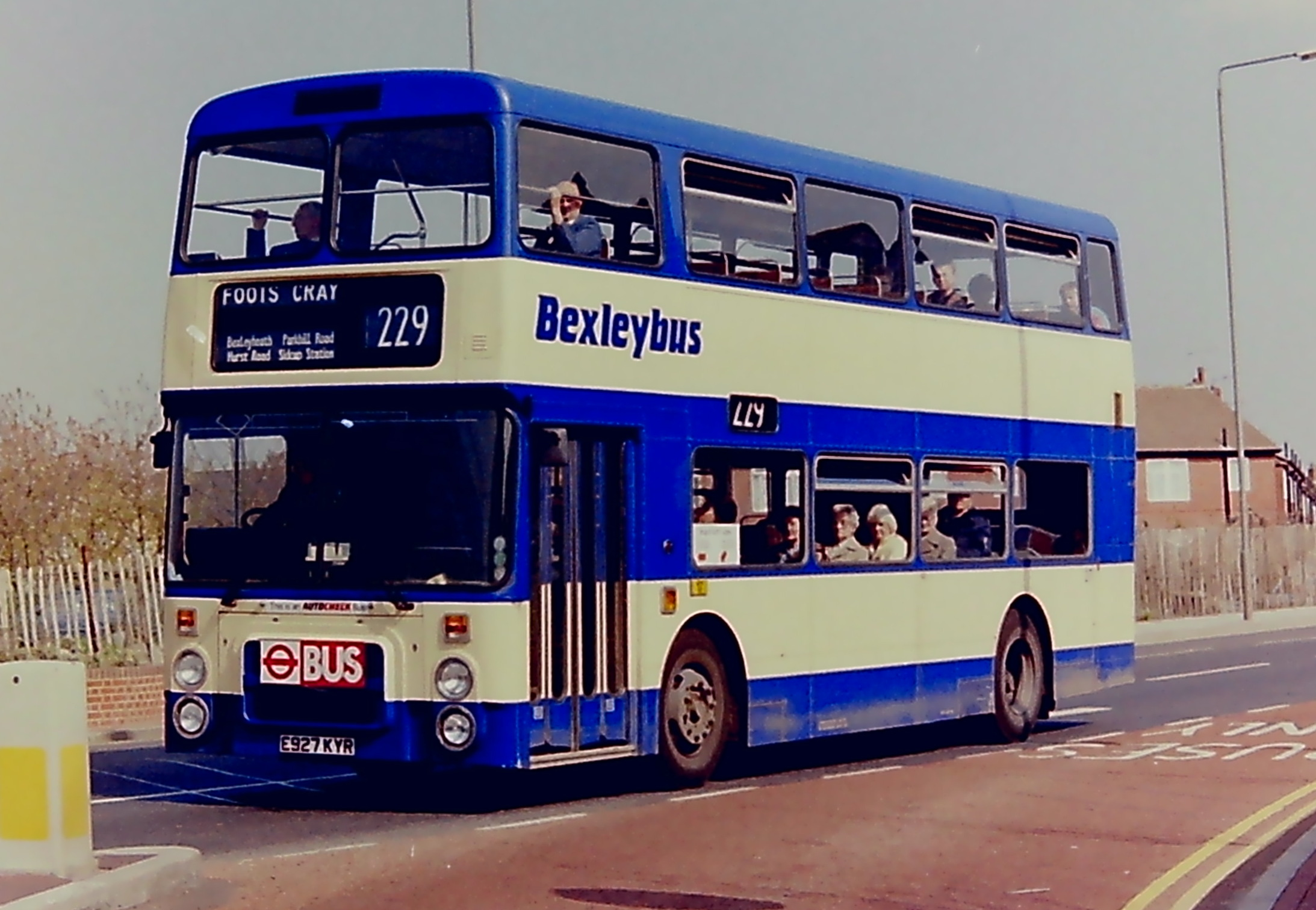
- Northern Counties bodied Leyland Olympian on Arnsberg Way, Bexleyheath in April 1988
- Parent: Selkent (London Regional Transport)
- Founded: 16 January 1988; 38 years ago
- Ceased operation: 24 January 1991; 35 years ago
- Headquarters: Bexleyheath bus garage
- Service area: Bexleyheath; Woolwich
- Routes: 17 (January 1988)
- Depots: 1
- Fleet: 107 (January 1988)

Bexleybus was a bus operator based in Bexleyheath in London, England. A low cost subsidiary of London Regional Transport's Selkent business unit, it operated services from January 1988 until the company's collapse in January 1991.

== History ==
Bexleybus was formed by Selkent as a low cost operator amid the privatisation of London bus services to operate tendered services in the Bexleyheath and Woolwich areas. With London Buses having to tender for routes as part of the London Regional Transport Act 1984, low cost units were established with the hope that reduced costs would allow them to be able to competitively bid.

Bexleybus commenced operating on 16 January 1988, operating 17 routes with 107 buses from a reopened Bexleyheath garage. Routes operated included 96, 99, 178, 229, 269, 272, 401, 422, 469, and 492. Buses included new leased Northern Counties bodied Leyland Olympians and reactivated and refurbished Daimler Fleetlines, Leyland Nationals, and Leyland Titans, which were painted in a blue and cream livery with blue 'BEXLEYBUS' fleetnames as opposed to traditional London red livery.

However, within weeks of commencing operations, Bexleybus was beset with industrial unrest, frequent vehicle breakdowns, noise and air pollution complaints served by Bexley Borough Council, and severe delays and cancellations on its bus services, alienating both staff and passengers; in October 1988, routes 422 and 492 were transferred to Boro'line Maidstone, and company managing director Garry Laurence was replaced by former London Transport traffic manager Alan Mecham.

Bexleybus ceased trading after losing most of its routes upon their re-tendering in January 1991, with some operations absorbed back into Selkent and up to 300 jobs lost at Bexleyheath garage. Restructuring by London Regional Transport prior to Bexleybus' closure ensured that Bexleyheath bus garage passed to London Central instead of also being closed.
