= London Buses route 81 =

London bus route

81
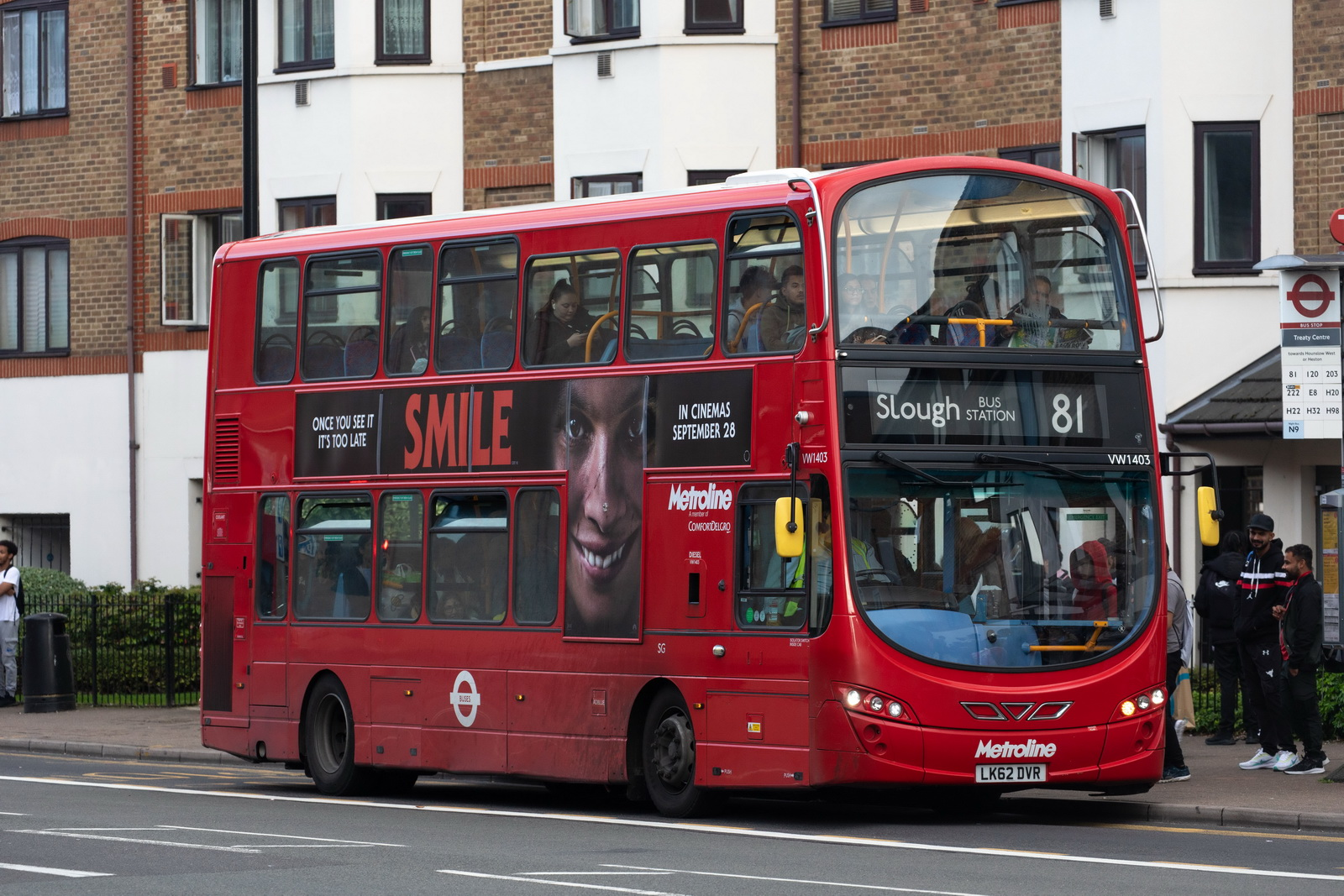
- Metroline Wright Eclipse Gemini 2 bodied Volvo B9TL at the Treaty Centre in September 2022

Overview
- Operator: Metroline
- Garage: Lampton
- Vehicle: Volvo B5LH Wright Gemini 3 Volvo B5LH MCV EvoSeti
- Peak vehicle requirement: 16
- Former operators: London United; Westlink; London Buslines; London Regional Transport

Route
- Start: Slough
- Via: Langley; Colnbrook; Harlington; Cranford; Hounslow West
- End: Hounslow bus station

London Buses route 81 is a Transport for London contracted bus route in London and Berkshire, England. Running between Slough and Hounslow bus station, it is operated by Metroline.

== History ==
The route goes back to the 1900s. Its original course was from Hounslow to Windsor Castle. By the 1940s, the route only operated on a daily basis from Hounslow to Slough, serving Eton and Windsor only at weekends. The section from Slough to Windsor Castle was withdrawn in 1963.

The 1980s saw the introduction by London Regional Transport of route tenders, with route 81 the first route to be put out to tender. The contract for the route was awarded to Len Wright Travel, which later became London Buslines effective from 13 July 1985.

Tendering saw the route move from Hounslow garage to Lampton (later Isleworth, then Southall) and revert to double deck, using yellow Daimler Fleetlines. These were replaced in 1987 by Leyland Lynxes. When retendered, the route was awarded to Westlink with it being operated out of Hounslow Heath garage from 29 July 1995 with Optare Deltas. Westlink became part of London United in September 1995. It remained with London United until Metroline took over on 27 July 2019 operating it out of its Lampton garage.

== Current route ==
Route 81 operates via these primary locations:

- Slough Queensmere Centre
- Langley
- Colnbrook
- Longford
- Harlington
- Cranford
- Hounslow West station
- Treaty Centre
- Hounslow bus station
