= Ralph Bennett =

British transport administrator

Ralph Featherstone Bennett

Personal details
- Born: 3 December 1923 Plymouth, Devon, U.K.
- Died: 10 November 2015 (aged 91) Kansas City, Missouri, U.S.
- Occupation: British Transport Administrator

Ralph Featherstone Bennett FIMechE, FCILT, FRSA (3 December 1923 – 10 November 2015) was a British transport administrator who was general manager of Manchester City Transport from 1965 to 1968 and chairman of the London Transport Executive from 1978 to 1980. Bennett introduced one-man operation to buses in Manchester and London and promoted London Underground's extension of the Piccadilly line to Heathrow Airport and the construction of the Jubilee line.

== Career ==
Bennett was born in Plymouth, Devon on 3 December 1923. After an education at Plympton Grammar School and Plymouth Technical College, he joined Plymouth City Council's Transport Department as an articled clerk in 1940. From 1955 to 1958 he was deputy general manager of transport in Plymouth before becoming general manager of transport in Great Yarmouth (1958–60), Bolton (1960–65) and Manchester (1965–68).

When at Manchester, he changed the name of the Manchester Corporation Transport Department to Manchester City Transport and ended trolley bus operations in 1966. He introduced one-man operation on buses for the first time in 1966, commissioning the Mancunian double-decker bus for this purpose and reforming the fare collection system.

In 1968, Bennett joined the London Transport Board and served as a member of this until 1970 and then of its successor, the London Transport Executive (LTE), until 1980; being its deputy chairman from 1971 to 1978 and its chairman from 1978 to 1980. As in Manchester, he introduced one-man operation on buses and simplified the fare system, though he retained conductors and Routemaster buses for operations on busy central London routes. Bennett supported the London Underground's extension of the Piccadilly line to Heathrow Airport (opened 1977) and the construction of the first section of the Jubilee line (opened 1979). During Bennett's time as deputy chairman and chairman, London Transport's finances were in poor order and passenger numbers were falling. Following a controversy over managerial waste and a critical report by management consultants commissioned by the Greater London Council, that advised that the LTE's senior management lacked the skills needed to manage the organisation, Bennett was dismissed as the chairman three years before the end of his term of office.

Business positions
Preceded by Sir Kenneth Robinson	Chairman, London Transport Executive; 1978–1980	Succeeded by Sir Peter Masefield
