= London Coaches =

Bus and coach operator in London and Kent, England

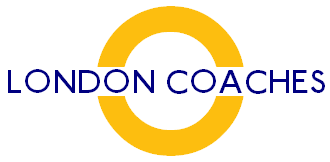

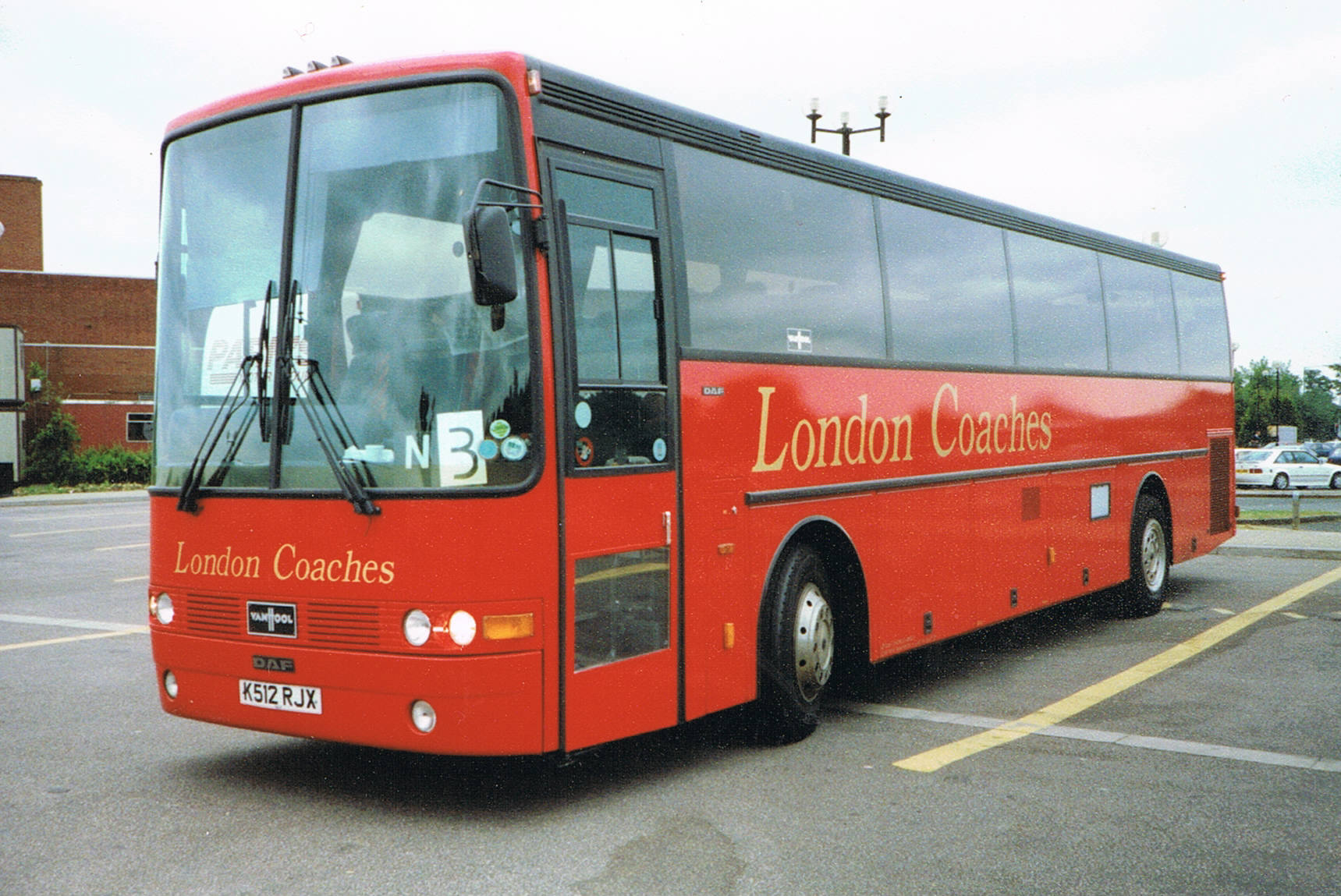
- London Coaches Van Hool bodied DAF SB3000 in post-privatisation livery
- Parent: Pullmans Group
- Founded: 1 April 1989; 36 years ago
- Defunct: March 2003; 22 years ago
- Headquarters: Wandsworth, South London, England
- Service area: London; Kent
- Depots: 2

London Coaches was a former bus and coach operator operating open top tourist services in London as well as commuter coach services from Kent to London.

== History ==
London Coaches originated from the London Transport Tours and Charters division. In January 1986, London Transport revamped the division and formed the Original London Transport Sightseeing Tour brand, operating a fleet of 50 modified open and closed topped AEC Routemaster buses on sightseeing tours of London.

Shortly following its creation, in March 1986, London Coaches partnered with West Midlands Travel's Central Coaches subsidiary to launch the 'London Liner' London to Birmingham joint express coach service, operated using a fleet of MCW Metroliner and Bova Futura coaches. A year later in March 1987, however, London Coaches pulled out from the partnership, leaving Central Coaches as the 'London Liner's sole operator.

In April 1988, London Coaches commenced operating a service from New Ash Green, Kent to London following the collapse of Bexleyheath Transport. This resulted in some buses being outstationed at Kentish Bus' Dartford depot; this moved in 1989 to Northfleet.

London Coaches was originally based at Battersea bus garage, before moving to Wandsworth bus garage in October 1988. London Coaches additionally had its own training business that operated from Wandsworth garage, offering PCV and HGV training.

=== Privatisation ===
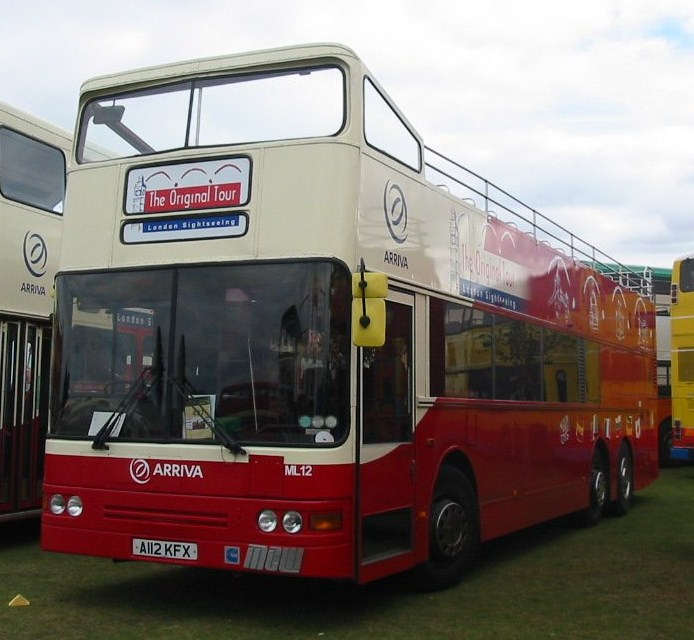
The Original Tour MCW Metroliner open-top sightseeing bus, pictured in 2004 following the purchase by Arriva

On 1 April 1989, in preparation for the privatisation of London bus services, London Buses Limited was separated into thirteen different business units. London Coaches was formed separately from the eleven new bus operating companies, commencing operations with a fleet of 85 buses and coaches. London Coaches was announced as the first London Buses operation to be privatised in September 1991, with the company, by then consisting of a fleet of 111 vehicles, being sold in May 1992 to a management buyout team led by Pat Waterman. Upon completion of the sale, the Pullmans Group was formed, trading as London Coaches.

London Coaches post-privatisation was forced to drop the "Transport" in its Original London Sightseeing Tour core business element, and was split into two operating units when it opened North Kent Road Car, later renamed London Coaches (Kent) Limited, in Northfleet. As well as maintaining a division for private coach hires, mainly formed of Van Hool and Ikarus-bodied DAF coaches, the company quickly became competitive with tenders for both express and regular bus services, acquiring the tender for route 726 between Dartford and London Heathrow Airport from Kentish Bus and Luton & District, rebranding the service 'Expresslink'. All commuter coach services were transferred from Wandsworth garage to London Coaches (Kent) in 1993 as the original London Coaches company began to tender to operate bus routes under contract to London Regional Transport.

In December 1993, London Coaches won the contract to run route 52. After various logistical, vehicle and staffing problems, in July 1994, London Coaches purchased Atlas Bus & Coach Company and transferred the route to Atlas's Willesden Junction garage. In November 1994, Atlas Bus & Coach Company was sold to Metroline along with route 52 and night bus route N52.

In January 1994, seven MCW Metroliner commuter coaches were purchased and converted to open top configuration. Cowie Group operator Grey-Green, based from a depot in Stroud housing 40 vehicles run by 21 members of staff, was sold to Pullmans Group for £1.34 million (equivalent to £3,177,000 in 2023) in May 1996 and integrated into London Coaches (Kent)'s 'North Kent Express' network, with Grey-Green's bus operations subsequently sold to British Bus subsidiary Maidstone & District as it did not fit London Coaches' core business, and in March 1997, Blue Triangle's open top operation was purchased, followed by the Cowie Group's 'Invictaway' Green Line service the following May.

Further restructuring in 1996 saw all of London Coaches' operations, with the exception of the Original London Sightseeing Tour, trading as The Original Tour, moved to London Coaches (Kent). The Original Tour continued under the London Coaches licence until December 1997, when the company was sold to Arriva, the rebranded and merged Cowie Group. London Coaches (Kent) was retained by the existing owners, however the company eventually ceased operations in March 2003.
