= London Forest =

Bus operator in East London, England

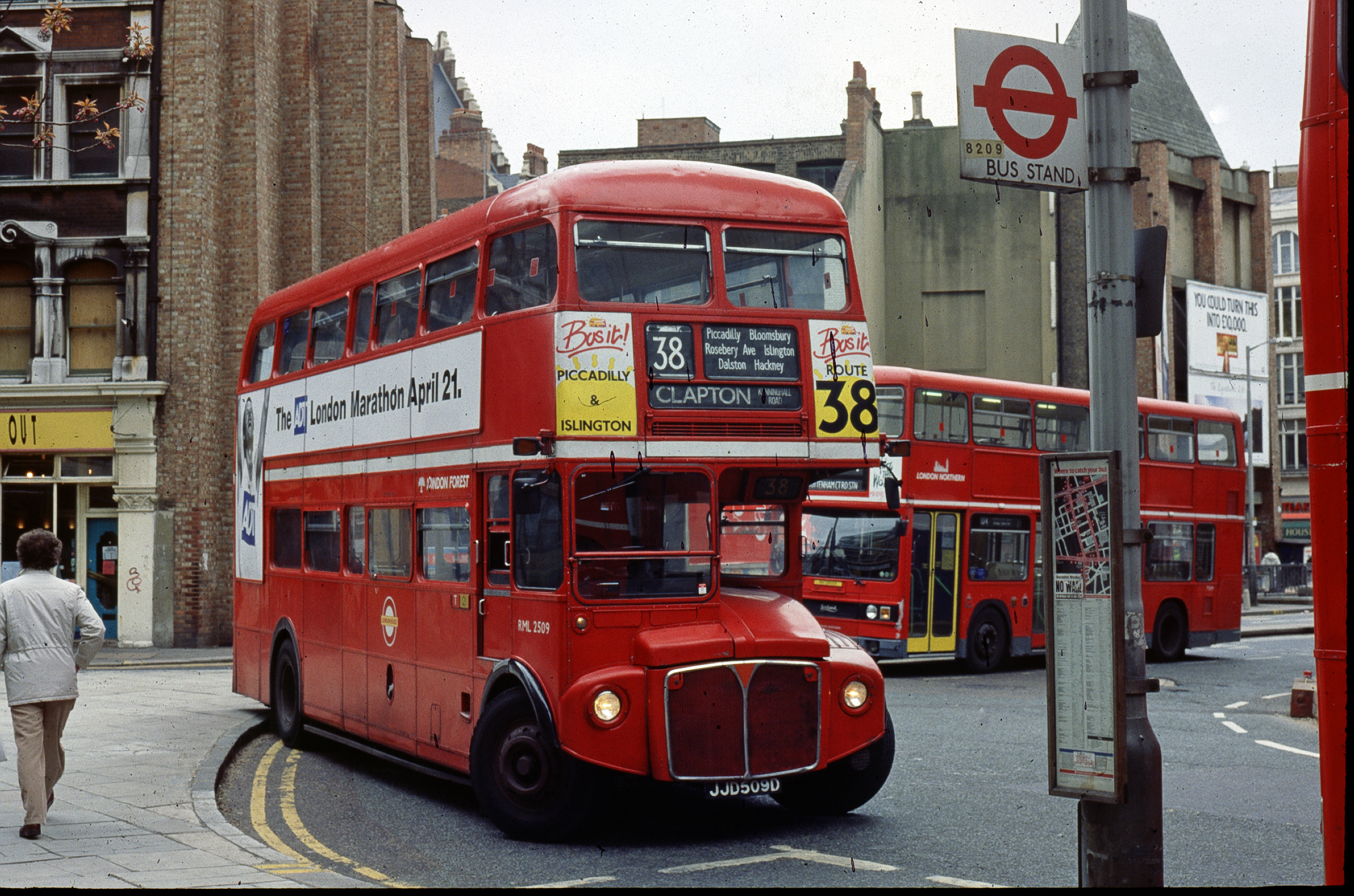
- AEC Routemaster on route 38 at Tottenham Court Road station in 1991
- Parent: London Buses Limited
- Commenced operation: 1 April 1989; 36 years ago
- Ceased operation: 23 November 1991; 33 years ago
- Headquarters: Walthamstow, London Borough of Waltham Forest, East London
- Service area: East London; North East London
- Service type: London bus services
- Depots: Ash Grove; Clapton; Leyton; Walthamstow
- Fleet: 361 (April 1989)
- Operator: London Forest Travel Limited
- Chief executive: Tom Young (April 1989–July 1991); Graham Elliott (July–November 1991)

London Forest Travel Limited was a subsidiary of London Regional Transport that operated tendered bus services in London between April 1989 and its closure in November 1991.

== History ==
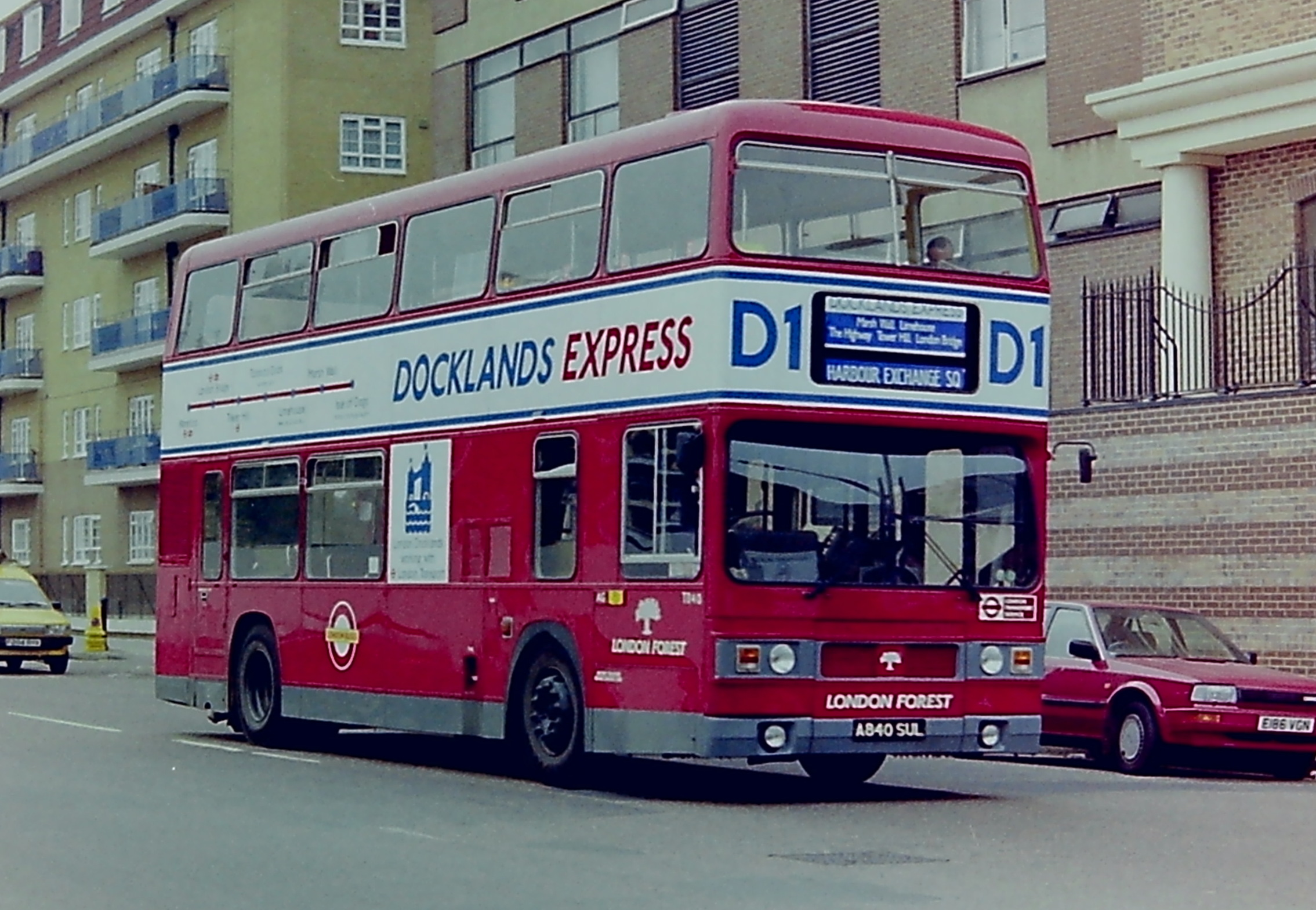
Leyland Titan operating 'Docklands Express' route D1 in Limehouse in October 1990

London Forest was formed as one of the eleven operating units of London Regional Transport's London Buses Limited subsidiary in readiness for privatisation. It commenced operating on 1 April 1989, being managed by Tom Young, who had previously worked for Midland Red North before moving to LRT. The company employed around 1,300 staff and owned 361 buses.

The company initially operated from garages in Ash Grove, Walthamstow and Leyton on a network of routes in North-East London. Clapton garage was later added: this had been closed in 1987, but reopened as an outstation of Leyton and later regained full depot status. The company's logo was a stylised image of an oak tree.

=== Demise ===
In May 1991, all eleven London Forest routes in the Walthamstow area came up for re-tendering. Forest won the contracts to operate all of the routes the following June, with the contracts set to commence operation from November out of Walthamstow garage, but soon found that it had bid too low for the work and was forced to cut wages. Reports differ as to the cut proposed, with 9.5%, 18%, 21%, and no pay cut if a 20% increase in the working week was accepted all being suggested. London Forest's management also announced that they intended to close Leyton garage.

In July 1991, all of the company's 1,300 staff affiliated with the Transport and General Workers' Union at its four garages went out on strike against these changes, leading to the suspension of services for two weeks. This was the first official strike by London bus drivers since 1958 and prompted Harry Cohen, the Labour Member of Parliament for Leyton, to issue an Early day motion in the House of Commons condemning London Forest's management. The company was forced to abandon the eleven Walthamstow routes, with work taken on by Country Bus & Coach, Ensignbus and Thamesway; Ensignbus, whose bus operations had recently been acquired by Hong Kong operator Citybus, used the opportunity to launch a new brand, Capital Citybus, on the routes in Walthamstow it had won, registering these routes under a separate entity named Walthamstow Citybus Limited.

Following the loss of the Walthamstow routes tender, it was announced that London Forest's Walthamstow garage, operational since 1905, would close, with Leyton being retained in its place on an initially temporary basis. Tom Young resigned as Managing Director of London Forest on 20 August 1991, coinciding with the unconnected arrest of company accountant David Charles Clarke amid an investigation by the Metropolitan Police into alleged financial fraud taking place at the company; Clarke was later placed on remand to appear at Waltham Forest Magistrates' Court on 25 November to face charges of theft, deception and forgery involving around £35,000 (equivalent to £95,000 in 2023), accused of using company cheques to pay for a car and a mortgage, as well as paying £300 (equivalent to £1,000 in 2023) to another London Forest employee. Young was replaced by London Buses' network service manager and Selkent and London General's non executive director Graham Elliott on an acting basis.

Despite the fact that the company still had three garages and 250 buses, London Buses decided in September 1991 that London Forest would cease operations, with the subsidiary declared to be "no longer viable" for winning future route tenders. The company formally ceased operations on 23 November with the loss of 40 administrative jobs at its Walthamstow head office, with Ash Grove garage also closing on this date and seeing its routes split between other London Buses subsidiaries in the area. Two garages were also acquired by London Buses subsidiaries on the day London Forest closed: Leyton garage was transferred to East London, saving the garage from being closed, and Clapton garage was transferred to Leaside Buses.

=== Legacy ===
Following the closure of London Forest, no large packages of tenders were offered at once by London Buses. Former managing director Tom Young went on to form West Midlands independent Choice Travel alongside business partner Barrie Marsden in 1992, both running the company until it was taken over by Arriva Midlands in 2012.

Ash Grove garage was first reopened between 1994 and 1998 for temporary use by Kentish Bus, also being used as a storage site for the London Transport Museum, reopening fully in 2000 with the formation of East Thames Buses. East Thames later moved to another site, with CT Plus also moving in that same year. Arriva London operated former Forest route 38 from the garage, using articulated buses that could not fit in nearby Clapton garage, between 2005 and 2009, returning to the garage to operate the first eight prototype New Routemasters on the route in 2012. Walthamstow garage never reopened and was redeveloped as housing, although the office building remains.
