= Westlink (bus company) =

British bus operating company

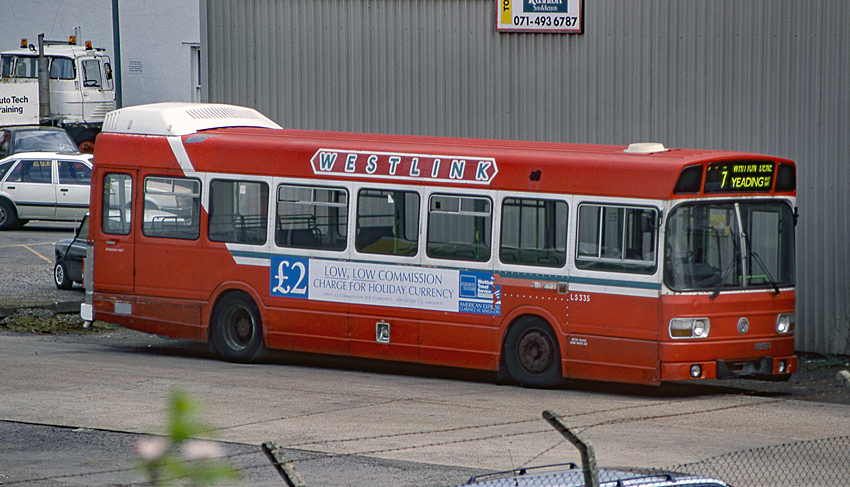
- LS335 Westlink Leyland National
- Parent: London United
- Founded: 1986
- Ceased operation: Mid-to-late 1990s
- Service area: South West London; West London
- Depots: 2

Westlink was an English bus operator. A subsidiary of London Regional Transport, it was established in August 1986, being privatised in January 1994, and sold to London United in September 1995.

== History ==
Westlink was formed in 1986 by London Regional Transport to operate tendered services in South West London and West London.

Routes operated included 81, 116, 117, 131, 203, 216, 371, 411, H20, H23, K1, K2, K3, K4 and K6. Garages were operated in Hounslow Heath and Kingston.

On 19 January 1994, Westlink was privatised in a management buyout. It was quickly sold to West Midlands Travel. The business was included in the April 1995 sale of West Midlands Travel to National Express, who sold it in September 1995 to London United. It continued to operate independently for a period, before being integrated into the London United business and the name fell out of use.
