= London Transport Executive (GLC) =

Executive agency responsible for public transportation in Greater London (1970-84)

- Formation: 1970 (Transport (London) Act 1969)
- Dissolved: 1984 (London Regional Transport Act 1984)
- Type: Public body
- Legal status: Executive agency within GLC
- Region served: Greater London
- Field: Intermodal transport
- Main organ: London Transport
- Parent organisation: Greater London Council (GLC)

The London Transport Executive was the executive agency within the Greater London Council, responsible for public transport in Greater London from 1970 to 1984. In common with all London transport authorities from 1933 to 2000, the public name and operational brand of the organisation was London Transport.

== Background and formation ==
The Greater London Council came into its powers in 1965, but did not have authority over public transport. Responsibility for such provision had been removed from the London County Council and neighbouring authorities in 1933 and passed to the London Passenger Transport Board. The Transport (London) Act 1969 gave the GLC powers over the London Underground and London Buses, but not over British Rail services in Greater London.

The operation of the London Transport Executive started from 1 January 1970.

== Fares policy ==
The GLC aimed to increase usage of public transport, especially in Outer London, where car use was high. Fare setting policy was used to increase patronage on the London Underground and London Buses, particularly during less busy times. Shortages of staff meant it was also necessary to speed up the rate of boarding on buses that ran without conductors, by introducing pre-purchased and inter-modal tickets. On 4 October 1981, following the Greater London Council election, the incoming Labour administration simplified fares in Greater London by introducing four new bus fare zones and two central London Underground zones, named City and West End, where flat fares applied for the first time. This was accompanied by a cut in prices of about a third and was marketed as the Fares Fair campaign. Following successful legal action against it, on 21 March 1982 London Buses fares were doubled and London Underground fares increased by 91%. The two central area zones were retained and the fares to all other stations were restructured to be graduated at three mile intervals; and thus grouping those stations within three miles of the central zones in an 'inner zone'. In 1983, after further legal action, a third revision of fares was undertaken, and a new inter-modal Travelcard season ticket was launched covering five new numbered zones; representing an overall cut in prices of around 25%. The off-peak One Day Travelcard was launched in 1984 and on weekdays was sold for travel after 09.30.

== Chairmen ==
- Sir Richard Way, 1970–1975
- Sir Kenneth Robinson, 1975–1978
- Ralph Bennett, 1978–1980
- Sir Peter Masefield, 1980–1982
- Sir Keith Bright, 1982–1984

== Abolition and legacy ==
The GLC was abolished in 1986, however transport powers had been removed two years earlier and transferred to London Regional Transport. Responsibility for public transport returned to local government in London in 2000, with the creation of the Greater London Authority and the Transport for London executive agency. The inter-modal zonal fare system devised during this period continues to be used throughout Greater London and is broadly unchanged.

Preceded by London Transport Board	London public transport authority 1970–1984	Succeeded by London Regional Transport
