= London Buslines =

British bus operating company

- Parent: Len Wright
- Founded: 13 July 1985
- Ceased operation: 10 March 1996
- Headquarters: Southall
- Service type: Bus operator
- Depots: 1

London Buslines was a bus operator in London that operated services under contract to London Buses between July 1985 and March 1996.

== History ==
London Buslines was formed to bid for bus services being put out to tender by London Buses as part of the deregulation of London bus services. It was owned by coach company proprietor Len Wright.

It commenced trading on 13 July 1985, when it became the first private operator to operate a London Buses service on route 81. Further contracts to operate other routes were won including routes 79, 90, 92, 190, 203, 258 and 285.

Operations commenced with second hand Daimler Fleetlines, with later purchases being Leyland Olympians and Dennis Darts. Initially operating out of Len Wright Travel's Isleworth garage, in October 1989 a garage was established in Southall.

On 20 March 1996, London Buslines was purchased by CentreWest, which in turn was sold to FirstBus in March 1997 and after being retained as a separate brand for a period, integrated into First London.
