= Capital Citybus =

Bus operator in East London

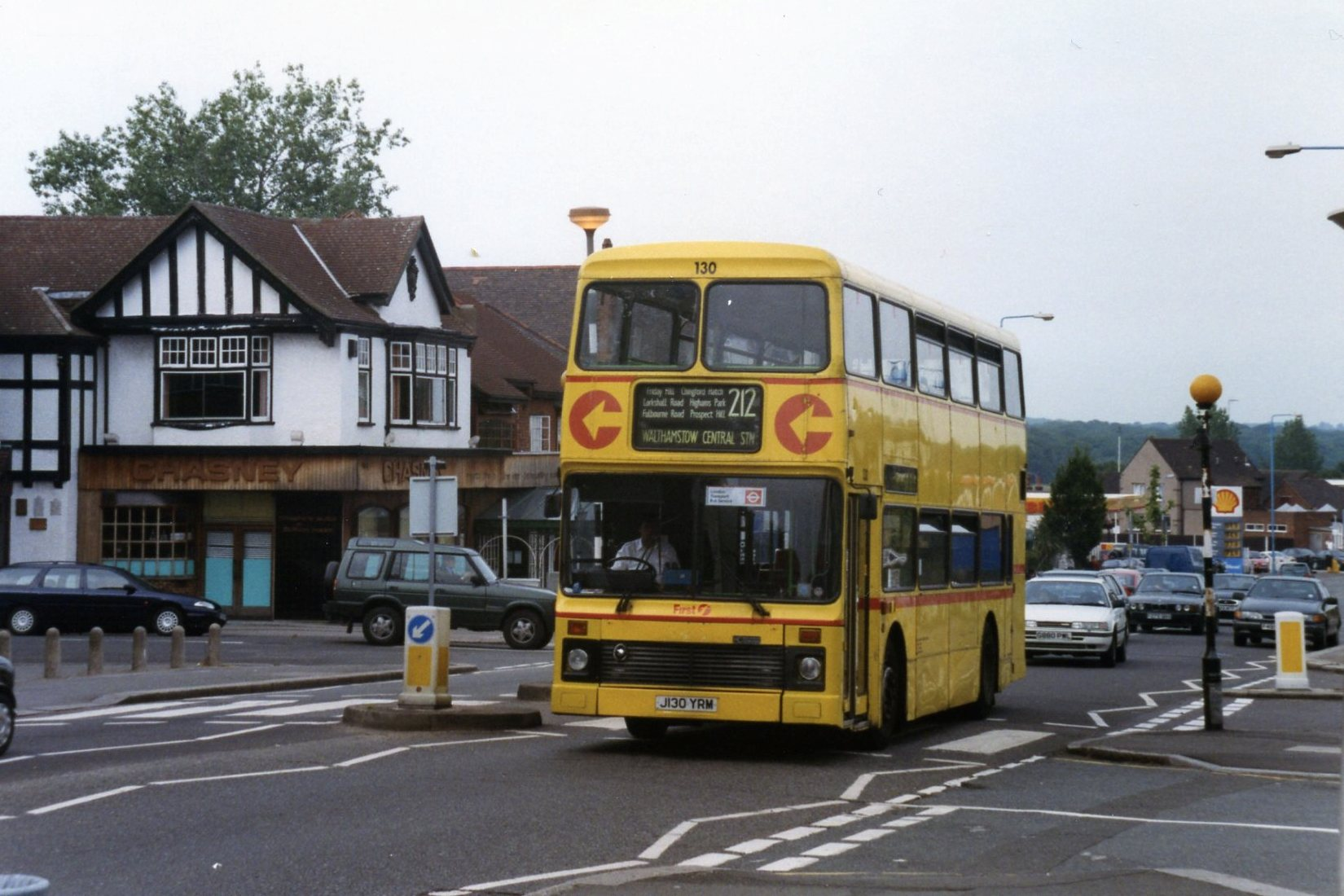
- Leyland Olympian in Chingford on route 212 in June 1999
- Parent: CNT Group (1990–1996); Management (1996–1998)
- Founded: 29 December 1990; 35 years ago
- Ceased operation: 8 July 1998; 27 years ago
- Headquarters: Dagenham, London Borough of Barking and Dagenham, England
- Service area: East London
- Service type: Bus operator
- Depots: 2
- Fleet: 201 (January 1996)
- Chief executive: Leon Daniels
- Chairman: Steven Norris

Capital Citybus was a bus operator in East London operating tendered bus services in London and parts of Hertfordshire. Initially owned by Tsui Tsin-tong's CNT Group, owner of Hong Kong bus operator Citybus, the company was sold in a buy-in management buyout during 1995 before eventually being purchased by the FirstGroup in July 1998.

== History ==
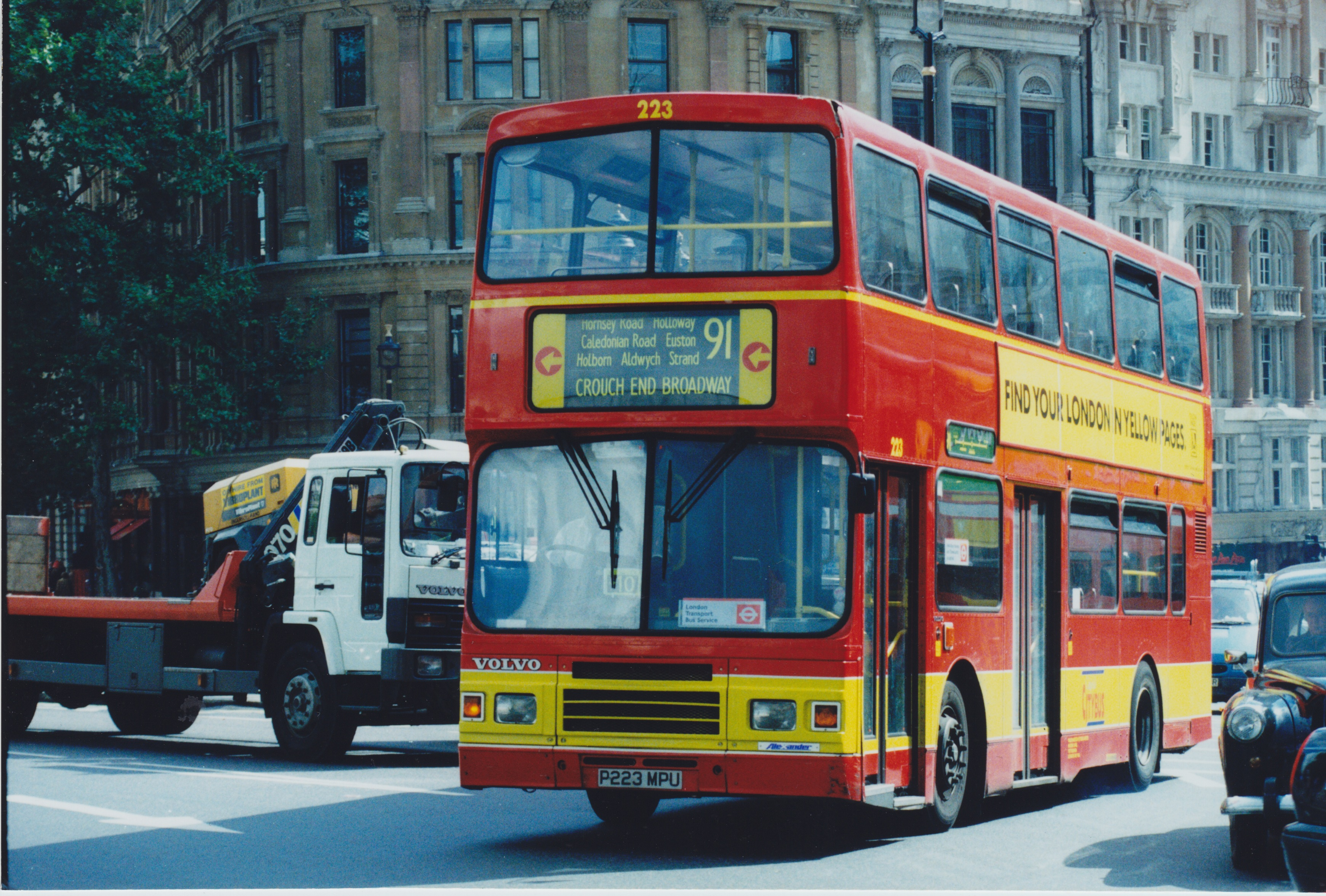
Alexander bodied Volvo Olympian at Trafalgar Square on route 91

Capital Citybus was established on 29 December 1990 with the purchase of the London tendered bus services of Ensignbus by the Hong Kong businessman Tsui Tsin-tong's CNT Group, owner of the bus operator Citybus there. CNT Group purchased Ensignbus' tendered London bus services, the Dagenham garage and 87 buses, initially rebranding the operation as Ensign Citybus.

In June 1991, owner Tsui Tsin-tong and Ensign Citybus managing director Leon Daniels submitted a proposal to London Regional Transport (LRT) to take over operations of Leaside Buses' route 29 using a fleet of 30 tri-axle Leyland Olympian double-decker buses worth £4 million (equivalent to £10,847,000 in 2023), similar to buses operated by the company's Hong Kong parent. The proposal was rejected by LRT on the grounds of extra cost, however a Citybus tri-axle Olympian destined for Hong Kong was operated by Capital Citybus on trial on route 123 during 1992, following a brief loan to LRT's Selkent business unit.

A large number of tendered routes in the Walthamstow area were gained after the collapse of LRT business unit London Forest. A new operation, Walthamstow Citybus Limited, was formed to operate the services in October 1991 and traded under a new identity of Capital Citybus; the new brand, later rolled out for the Dagenham operations, replaced the adapted Ensignbus silver and blue livery with an allover yellow livery with red striping and stylised C logos in the shape of an arrow on either side of the front destination blind. Buses featured red fleetnames incorporating the Chinese characters "城巴" (Citybus) and the stylised C with the Capital Citybus name, along with taglines such as "moving comfortably ahead" and "here today... here tomorrow". Northumberland Park garage was opened to accommodate Capital Citybus' new Walthamstow operations.

By 1992, Capital Citybus was also operating six commercial routes, mainly in the Romford area, as well as Hertfordshire County Council-contracted service 321 between Rickmansworth and Luton on Sundays. Capital Citybus was a frequent contractor for British Rail and London Underground replacement service work, and during its existence operated specially liveried vehicles for Docklands Light Railway and the East London Line replacement services. Citybus Holdings BVI Ltd, the holding company for both Capital Citybus and the Hong Kong Citybus operation, was floated on the Hong Kong Stock Exchange when it became part of China Paint Holdings Ltd in February 1992.

On 21 December 1995, CNT Group sold Capital Citybus in a buy-in management buyout, financially backed by Lloyds Development Capital, Lombard North Central and NatWest Markets. After the sale of the company to its management, the Chinese character fleetnames and stylised arrow-styled C logos were phased out. Retiring Member of Parliament for Epping Forest and former London transport minister Steven Norris was appointed as non-executive chairman of Capital Citybus by the end of 1996.

On 8 July 1998, Capital Citybus, by then holding 5% of the London bus operating market, was sold to the FirstGroup for £14.1 million (equivalent to £31,339,000 in 2023), with Steven Norris earning a windfall gain of up to £600,000 (equivalent to £1,334,000 in 2023) from the sale. After a period of initially operating separately, the company was integrated into the other First London operations.
