= Peter Masefield =

British aeronautical engineer, journalist, and industrialist (1914–2006)

Sir Peter Masefield
- Born: 19 March 1914
- Died: 14 February 2006 (aged 91)
- Occupations: Chief Executive of British European Airways: 1949–1956; Chairman of British Airports Authority: 1965–1970; Chairman of London Transport Executive: 1980–1982

Sir Peter Masefield (19 March 1914 – 14 February 2006) was a leading figure in Britain's post war aviation industry, as Chief Executive of British European Airways in the 1950s, and chairman of the British Airports Authority in the 1960s.

== Life ==
Peter Gordon Masefield was born in 1914 in Trentham, Staffordshire. Initially educated at Westminster School and Chillon College in Montreux, Switzerland, Masefield studied engineering at Jesus College, Cambridge. Following a childhood fascination with aircraft, Masefield gained his pilot's licence while in Cambridge which he maintained for the rest of his career.

Masefield initially worked as a junior draughtsman at Fairey Aviation from 1935 to 1937, before moving into journalism on the staff of The Aeroplane 1937–1943. He became aviation correspondent for The Sunday Times, and at the start of the Second World War was sent to France to cover the RAF Advanced Air Striking Force.

Turned down by the Royal Air Force as a pilot due to poor vision, Masefield flew with the United States Army Air Forces (USAAF) as an occasional co-pilot and air gunner while maintaining his journalism career. A daylight raid on Le Bourget in 1943 led to the nose of his Boeing B-17 Flying Fortress being blown off, with a consequential crash landing in East Anglia, luckily without injury.

Following a 1943 article by Masefield criticising the Ministry of Aircraft Production, Lord Beaverbrook removed him from active service, appointing him as his personal advisor and Secretary of the Brabazon Committee, which planned for post-war British civil aviation. Masefield also accompanied Beaverbrook to Washington DC for talks that led to the creation of the International Civil Aviation Organization. Masefield also played a major part in the 1946 negotiations of the Bermuda Agreement – which governed air services and routes between the United States and the UK.

=== British European Airways ===
In 1949 Lord Douglas (Marshal of the Royal Air Force), then-chairman of British European Airways (BEA) made Masefield chief executive, despite Masefield being just 35. Controlling a large number of staff on a small budget, tight cost control measures were combined with innovative methods to boost revenue and passenger loads – such as off-peak fares on late evening flights and high frequency services on popular routes. This commercially aggressive approach including resulted in monthly earnings of £1 million, and BEA was profitable by 1955. Other successes included ordering the Vickers Viscount turboprop airliner – which became the leading short-haul aircraft in Europe by the mid-1950s – and resisting the potential merger of British Overseas Airways Corporation (BOAC) with BEA.

=== Aircraft production ===
After seven years Masefield went to work for Bristol Aircraft, with the aim of Britain continuing as a major player in civil aviation. However, the introduction of the turboprop Bristol Britannia was late, and it could not compete with the Boeing 707 jetliner and the start of the Jet Age. In 1960 Masefield formed Beagle Aircraft Limited with the financial support of the Pressed Steel Company, which incorporated Auster Aircraft Company and F.G Miles Limited by 1962.

=== British Airports Authority ===
In 1965 Masefield was made chairman of the British Airports Authority (BAA), which took over management of the major airports in the UK. Owing to the Jet Age, passenger numbers increased by 62% to 20 million a year, with profits of £38m. However, Masefield disagreed with the government regarding plans for a proposed airport at Maplin Sands, and some politicians called for him to be dismissed. A second five-year term running BAA was not forthcoming, and he retired from the chairmanship at the end of 1976, to be succeeded in the new year by Nigel Foulkes.

Following this, Masefield had a variety of roles, including deputy chairman at British Caledonian and president of the Royal Aeronautical Society.

=== London Transport ===
Masefield joined the board of London Transport in 1973. In 1980, Sir Horace Cutler, leader of the Greater London Council asked Masefield to become chairman of London Transport, a job he did for two years. During the period, investment on the London Underground was not substantial, which has been subsequently criticised. Masefield retired from the role in 1982, aged 67.

In the following years Masefield remained active as a chairperson, director and committee member for a wide variety of trusts, committees and museums – including Brooklands Museum (being the first chairman of its trustees), the British Association of Aviation Consultants and the Croydon Airport society. He was president of the British Aviation Preservation Council (now Aviation Heritage UK) and also became an author, writing a history of the R101 airship, as well as an autobiography.

Masefield was knighted in 1972. He died on 14 February 2006, aged 91.
