= Grey-Green =

Former bus and coach operator

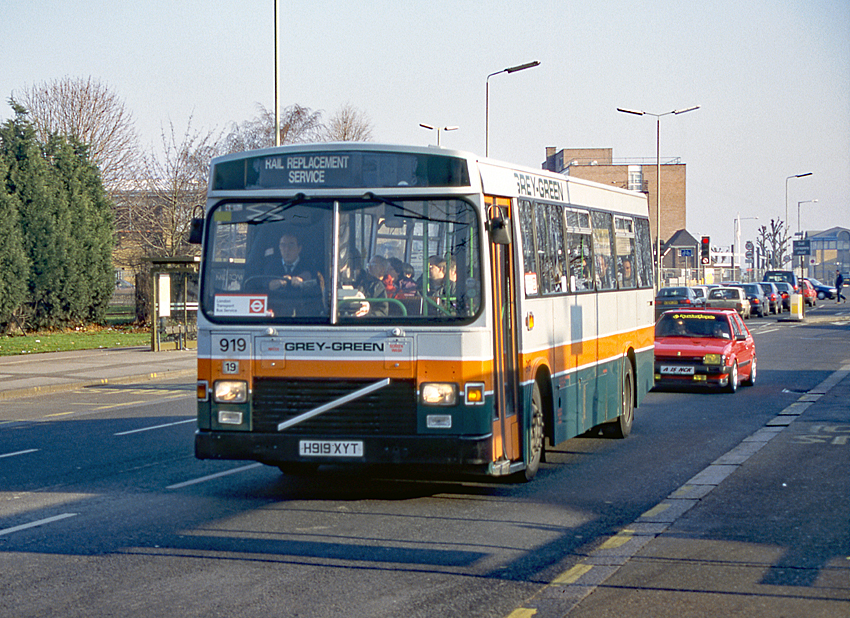
- Grey-Green East Lancs EL2000 bodied Volvo B10B in Enfield in January 1997
- Parent: Arriva
- Founded: 1885
- Ceased operation: 1998
- Headquarters: Stamford Hill
- Service type: Bus operator

Grey-Green was a bus and coach operator in England. It was based in Stamford Hill and operated in London and the East of England.

== History ==
Grey-Green can trace its origins back over a century to the foundation of George Ewer's horse carriage business in 1885. The business prospered, and summer-only services were soon operating to many South Coast resorts. Before the end of the 1920s, East Anglia was well covered too. The first service to operate throughout the year was a London to Ipswich service that commenced in June 1928.

The 1930s started with the introduction of a London to Harwich service, and operations continued to expand rapidly through East Anglia and to the coast, interrupted only by World War II. Routes run by the Prince Omnibus Company of Edmonton were added in the 1930s. Orange Luxury Coaches, Brixton was acquired in 1953, and this long-established company remained as a subsidiary of the main company until wound up in December 1975. Orange Luxury Coaches vehicles carried the Queen's arms, being suppliers of coaches to the royal household.

The large-but-ageing United Service Transport fleet was taken over in 1965. Several of the companies taken over retained their separate identities and distinctive liveries in order to maintain goodwill, but in 1966 it was decided to concentrate the group's operations on two trading names: Grey-Green and Orange.

By 1972 it operated out of garages in Stamford Hill, Edmonton, Lea Bridge, Mile End and Brixton in London, and Walton-on-the-Naze, Ipswich, Felixstowe and Great Yarmouth in East Anglia.

Subsequent acquisitions included the London coaching business of Birch Brothers in 1971, Mitcham Belle Coaches in 1974, and Dix Coaches in 1976. In 1980 Grey-Green was a founding member of the British Coachways consortium which competed with National Express, but pulled out after a year.

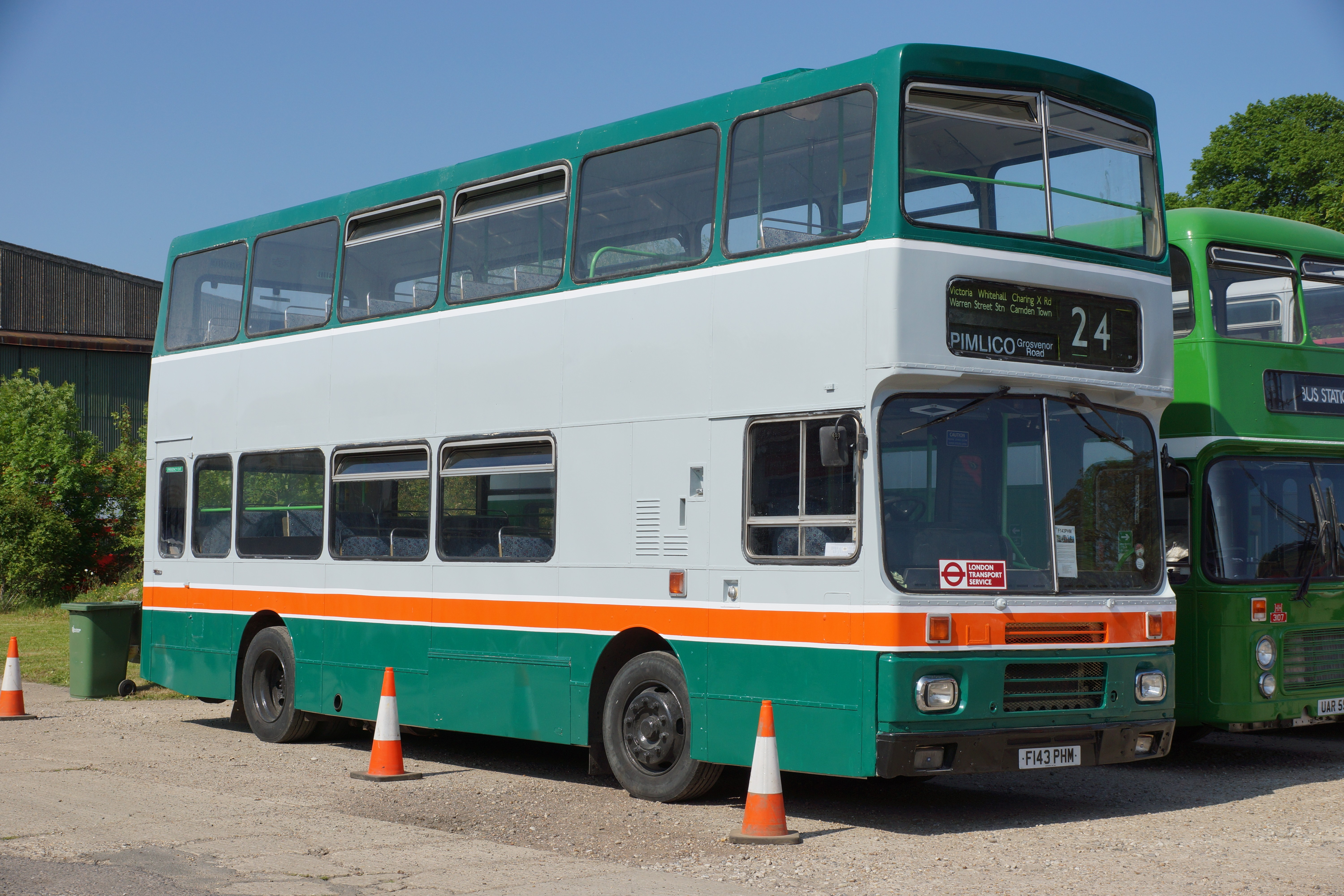
Preserved Grey-Green Alexander bodied Volvo Citybus

In 1980 Grey-Green was sold to the Cowie Group. It was one of the first private operators to operate London Regional Transport services under contract following the process started with the privatisation of London bus services, eventually operating nearly 20 in all. In 1987, Grey-Green successfully bid for routes 125, 173, 179 and 379. In 1988, it began operating routes 24, 298 and 313.

In 1991, a further five routes were taken over and a new Barking garage opened. By 1994, the portfolio had expanded to include routes 20, 103, 141, 167, 168, 188, 210, 235, 275, 473 and D9. The high-profile routes 24 and 188 brought non-red London buses directly into the city. Grey-Green also operated bus services in Kent, in Tunbridge Wells, Maidstone and Medway, commuter services from Essex and north Kent to London, and international services to Paris and Amsterdam.

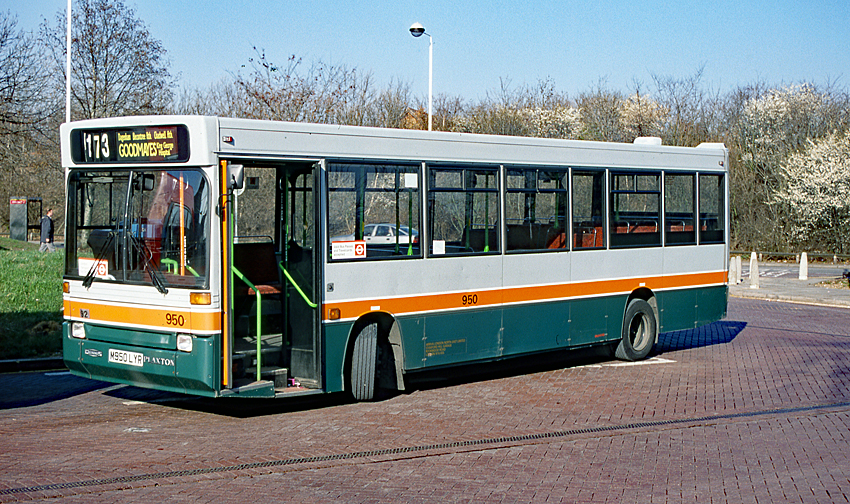
950 Grey-Green Plaxton bodied Dennis Dart at Beckton

The company's basic livery was green and white (having evolved from the green and grey that gave Grey-Green its name), with an orange stripe at waist-level. The coaching fleets were painted in separate liveries. With the growth of the Cowie Group through acquisition of other bus operators, Grey Green co-existed for a time with other companies such as Kentish Bus.

In 1998, the Cowie Group was rebranded as Arriva, and Grey-Green's Stamford Hill and Barking garages were absorbed into Arriva London, and the other operations by other Arriva companies.
