= Treaty Centre =

Coordinates: 51.468°N 0.364°W

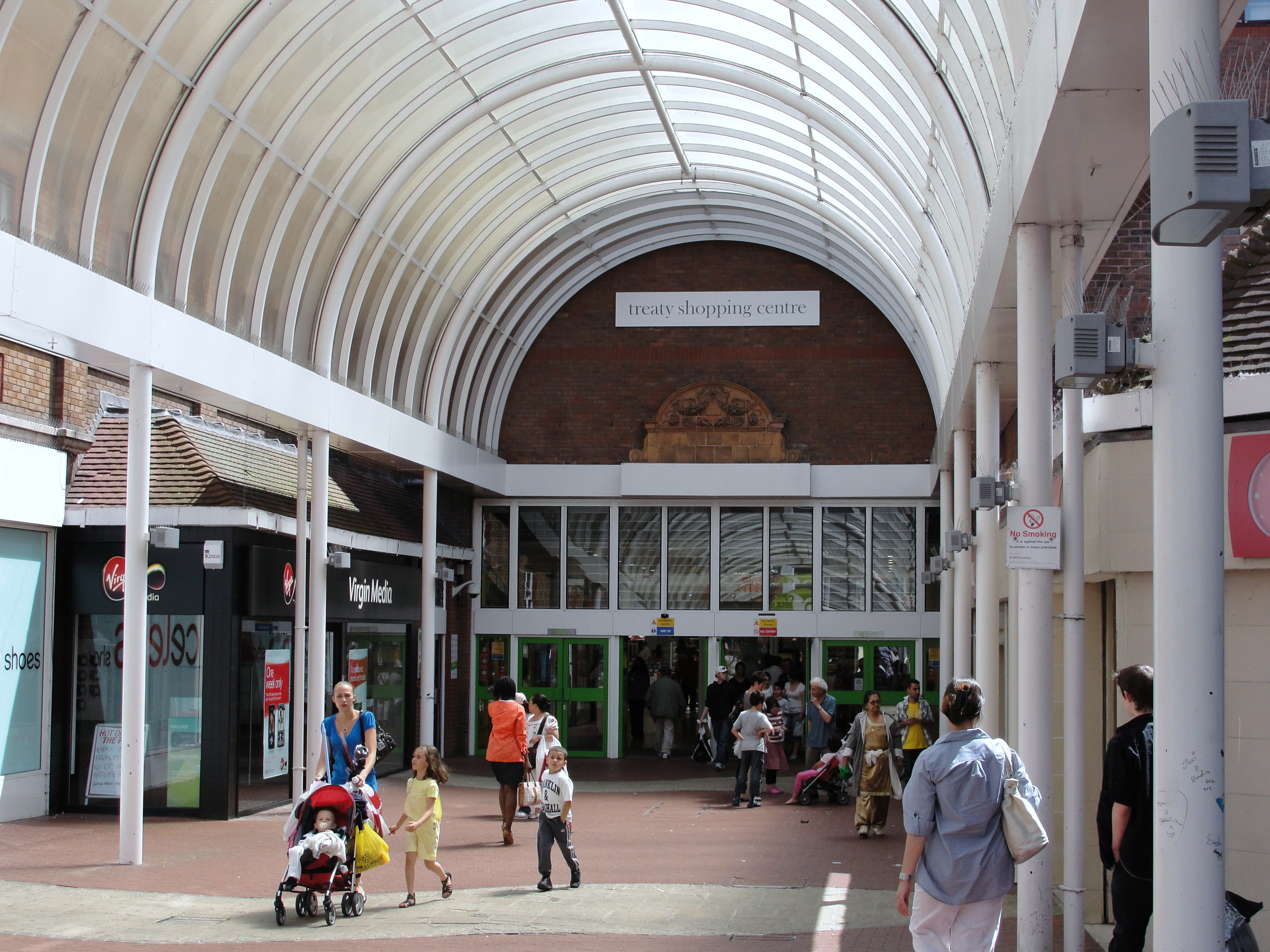
- Location: Hounslow, England
- Opened: 29 September 1987; 39 years ago
- Owner: LaSalle Investment Management
- Num. of stores: 51
- Floor area: 270,194 sq ft (25,101.8 m^{2})
- Parking: 700 spaces
- Website: www.treatyshoppingcentre.co.uk

The Treaty Centre is an enclosed shopping mall in the town centre of Hounslow in Greater London, England. Opened on 29 September 1987 and located on the High Street, the Treaty Centre offers 270,194 square feet of retail space and is anchored by Wilkinsons. It has an average weekly footfall of 195,000 people.

== History ==
The centre took two years to build, and more than 10 years in planning. The 5.8 acres (2.3 ha) site was built on the site of a former library and civic hall buildings dating back to 1905 which were demolished.

In 2006, a rival shopping centre called the Blenheim Centre was built to the north.

In 2011, the Treaty Centre was acquired by Quidnet Capital for £37 million and in the following years the centre was refurbished. In 2012, Quidnet raised concerns regarding a development agreement entered into by Hounslow Council and Legal & General (L&G) to develop shopping, leisure and residential facilities alongside the Blenheim Centre, as being in breach of Article 56 ("freedom to provide services") of the Treaty on the Functioning of the European Union. Their legal challenge was unsuccessful because the European single market was not a factor in the case and the development agreement did not commit L&G to provide any services to the Council or restrict the ability of any other business to provide services.

== Gallery ==
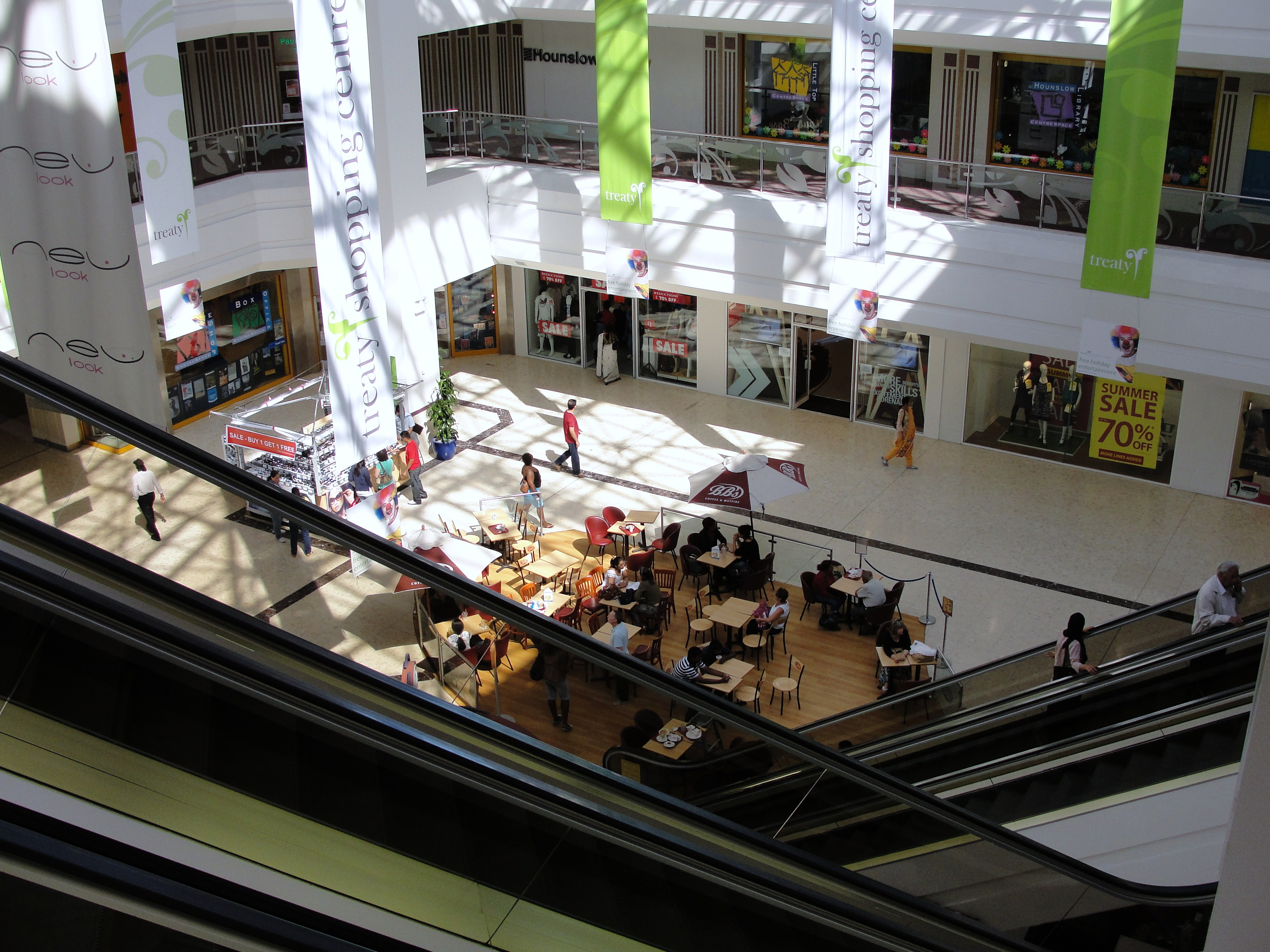
Inside the Treaty Centre

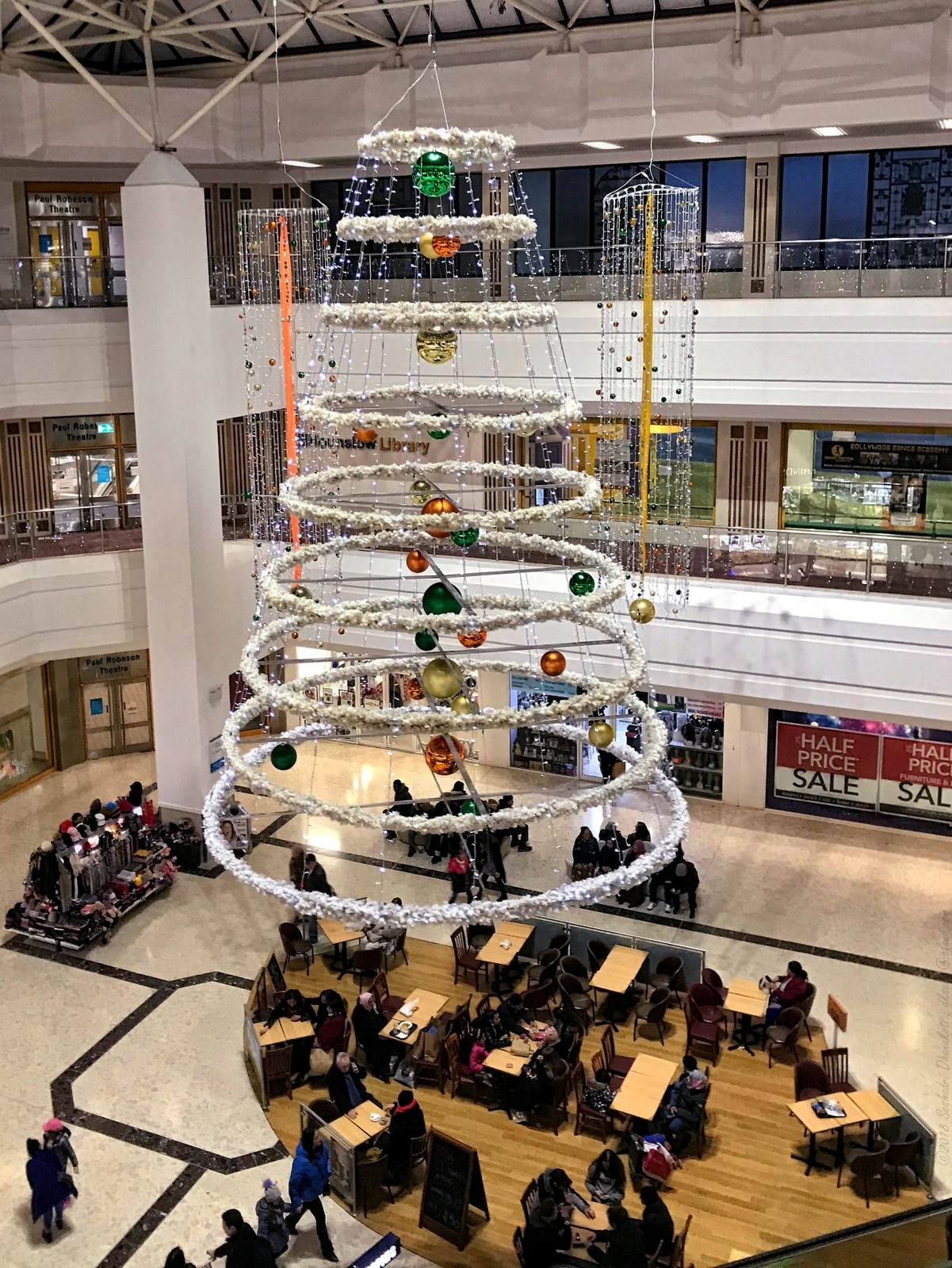
Inside the Treaty Centre during Christmas time

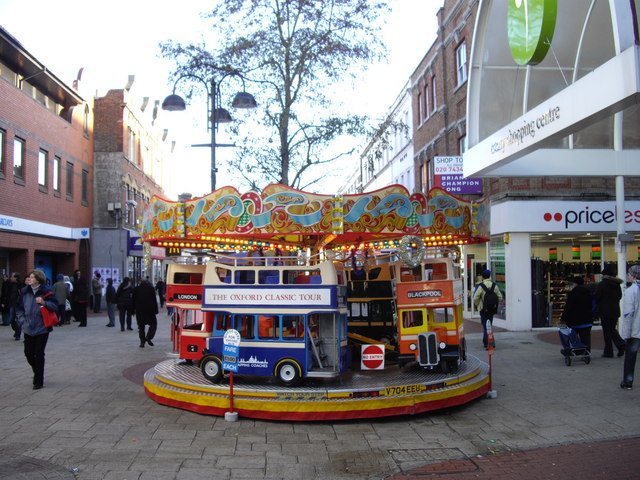
A carousel on High Street, in front of the Treaty Centre's entrance
