= London Regional Transport =

Former public transport authority in London

- Formation: 29 June 1984 (London Regional Transport Act 1984)
- Dissolved: 16 July 2003 (Greater London Authority Act 1999, The London Regional Transport (Dissolution) Order 2003)
- Type: Public body
- Purpose: Transport authority
- Headquarters: 55 Broadway, Westminster, London
- Region served: London, England
- Main organ: London Transport
- Parent organisation: Government of the United Kingdom

LRT logo 1984-1989

London Regional Transport (LRT) was the organisation responsible for most of the public transport network in London, England, between 1984 and 2000. In common with all London transport authorities from 1933 to 2000, the public name and operational brand of the organisation was London Transport from 1990, but until then it traded as LRT. This policy was reversed after the appointment of Sir Wilfrid Newton in 1989, who also abolished the recently devised LRT logo and restored the traditional roundel.

== History ==
The LRT was created by the London Regional Transport Act 1984 and was under direct state control, reporting to the Secretary of State for Transport. It took over responsibility from the Greater London Council on 29 June 1984, two years before the GLC was formally abolished. Because the act only received royal assent three days earlier, its assets were temporarily frozen by the banks as they had not received mandates to transfer. The headquarters of the new organisation remained at the former London Transport Executive building at 55 Broadway.

On 1 April 1985, the company was re-organised into several companies with London Regional Transport as the holding company. London Buses Limited was formed to manage the bus network and London Underground Limited the London Underground network, as wholly owned subsidiaries of LRT.

In 1985 the operation of some bus services was put out to tender for the first time and, for a number of years, buses bearing a variety of different colour-schemes operated alongside those still operating in the traditional red livery by operators such as Armchair Passenger Transport, Boro'line Maidstone, Capital Citybus, Grey-Green, Harris Bus, Kentish Bus, London Buslines and Metrobus. In response to the competition, LRT established low-cost business units Bexleybus and Westlink. The variety of liveries was found to be confusing to tourists and non-Londoners expecting to find red-painted buses and, after lobbying from the tourist board, in 1997 it became a requirement when contracts were retendered that bus liveries be predominantly red.

In 1987, the computer services division was sold to Cap Gemini for £1.3 million. On 1 April 1989 London Buses was divided into business units, in preparation for privatisation.

Business unit	Area	Logo	Legal entity
CentreWest	West	Arrow	CentreWest London Buses Limited
East London	East	Barge	East London Bus & Coach Company Limited
Leaside	River Lea	Swan	Leaside Bus Company Limited
London Central	South central	Ship	London Central Bus Company Limited
London Forest	Waltham Forest	Oak tree	London Forest Travel Limited
London Coaches	Central London	n/a	London Coaches Limited
London General	Southwest	Omnibus	London General Transport Services Limited
London Northern	North	Parliament	London Northern Bus Company Limited
London United	Southwest	Crest	London United Busways Limited
Metroline	Northwest	Stripes	Metroline Travel Limited
Selkent	Southeast	Hops	South East London & Kent Bus Company Limited
South London	South	Tower Bridge	South London Transport Limited
Westlink	Kingston	n/a	Stanwell Buses Limited

In November 1993, the Government deferred the proposed deregulation of buses in London, noting that the sell-off of London Buses business units would continue. Between September 1994 and January 1995, these bus units were sold. Upon the privatisation of British Rail, the Waterloo & City line passed to the London Underground and LRT management on 1 April 1994.

LRT remained in overall control of public transport in London until 2 July 2000 when Transport for London, an agency of the newly created Greater London Authority took over responsibility under the Greater London Authority Act 1999. The transfer of responsibility was staged, with transfer of control of London Underground delayed until July 2003, when London Underground Limited became an indirect subsidiary of TfL. LRT was subsequently dissolved on the 16 July 2003.

== Fares ==
LRT was responsible for some modifications to the fare system, including inclusion of the separately managed British Rail services. In January 1985 the Capitalcard season ticket was launched, offering validity on British Rail as well as London Underground and London Buses. It was priced around 10-15% higher than the Travelcard. In June 1986 the One Day Capitalcard was launched. The Capitalcard brand ended in January 1989 when the Travelcard gained validity on British Rail. In January 1991 Zone 5 was split to create a new Zone 6. The Docklands Light Railway was opened on 31 August 1987 and was included in the zonal Travelcard ticketing scheme.

== Chairmen ==
- Sir Keith Bright, 1984–1988
- Sir Neil Shields, 1988–1989
- Sir Wilfrid Newton, 1989–1994
- Peter Ford, 1994-1998
- Sir Malcolm Bates, 1999–2001
- Bob Kiley, 2001
- Sir Malcolm Bates, 2001–2003

== Publication ==
LT News was London Regional Transport's inhouse journal. First published in April 1973, it was originally published fortnightly, becoming monthly in January 1988. It was renamed LRT News in July 1984, before resuming its original title in September 1990.

== See also ==
- Governance of Greater London (1986–2000)

Preceded by London Transport Executive (GLC)	London public transport authority 1984–2000	Succeeded by Transport for London
