= London Regional Transport Act 1984 =

Act of the Parliament of the United Kingdom

London Regional Transport Act 1984 (Note: Section 72(1).)
- Act of Parliament
- Parliament of the United Kingdom
- Long title: An Act to make provision with respect to transport in and around Greater London and for connected purposes.
- Citation: 1984 c. 32
- Territorial extent: England and Wales (Note: Section 72(7).)

Dates
- Royal assent: 26 June 1984
- Commencement: 29 June 1984 (Note: Section 72(2).)
Other legislation
Amends	London Passenger Transport Act 1933; Public Passenger Vehicles Act 1981
Amended by	London Cab Act 1968; London Regional Transport (Amendment) Act 1985; Agricultural Holdings Act 1986; Road Traffic (Consequential Provisions) Act 1988; Capital Allowances Act 1990; Planning (Consequential Provisions) Act 1990; Water Consolidation (Consequential Provisions) Act 1991; Taxation of Chargeable Gains Act 1992; London Regional Transport (Penalty Fares) Act 1992; Audit Commission Act 1998; Capital Allowances Act 2001

Status: Amended

Text of statute as originally enacted

Revised text of statute as amended

Text of the London Regional Transport Act 1984 as in force today (including any amendments) within the United Kingdom, from legislation.gov.uk.

The London Regional Transport Act 1984 (c. 32) is an act of the Parliament of the United Kingdom concerning the administration of public transport services in London.

== Background ==
The act was a response to the "Fares Fair" campaign by the leader of the Greater London Council, Ken Livingstone.

== Provisions ==
The act transferred responsibility for passenger transport services from the Greater London Council to the Secretary of State for Transport.

The act enabled tendering for subsidised bus networks in London.
