= Boro'line Maidstone =

Bus operator in Kent, England

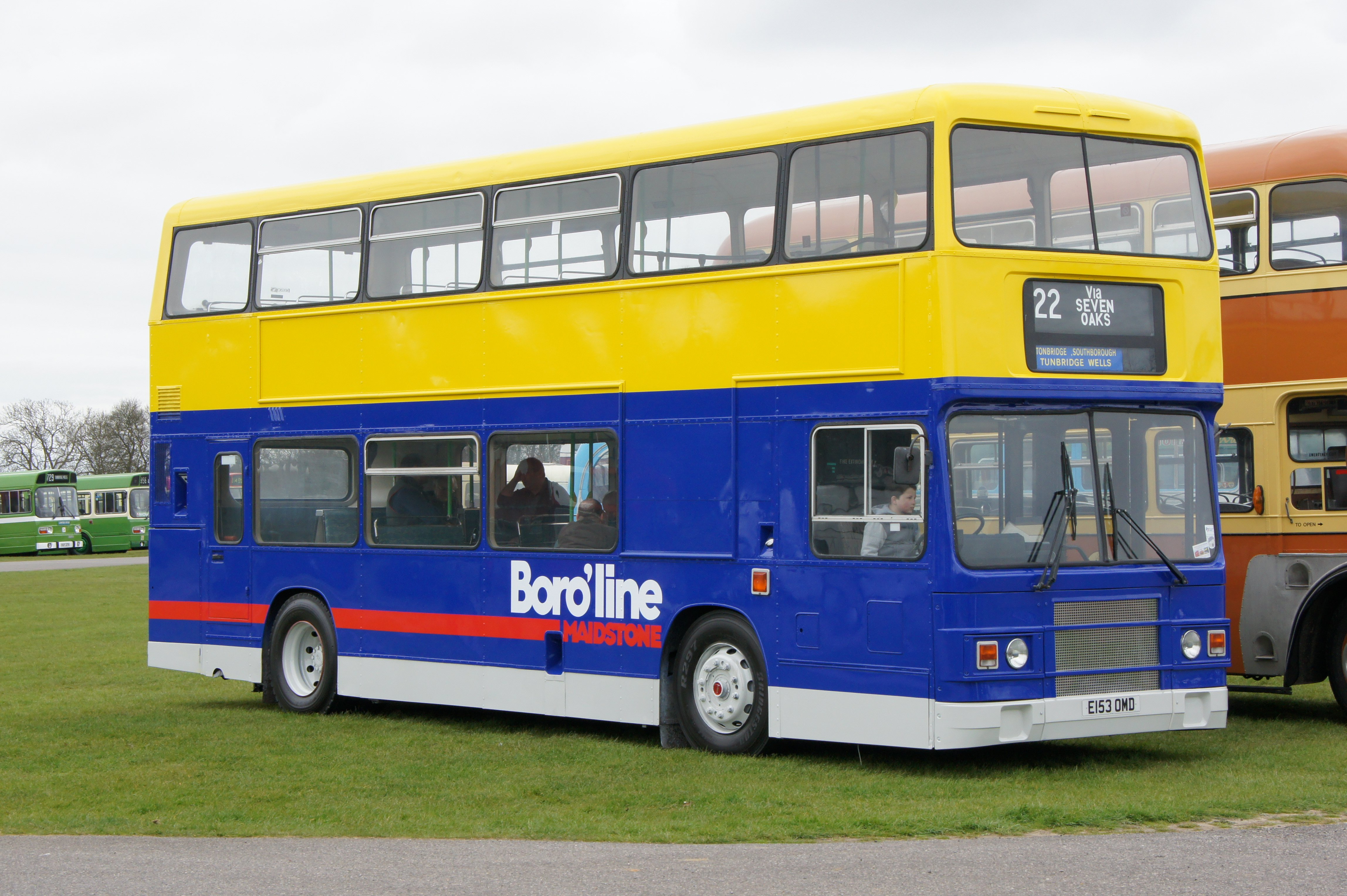
- Preserved Optare bodied Leyland Olympian in March 2012
- Parent: Maidstone Borough Council
- Founded: 1986; 40 years ago
- Ceased operation: 1992; 34 years ago
- Headquarters: Northfleet
- Service area: Maidstone
- Service type: Bus operator

Boro'line Maidstone, previously Maidstone Borough Council Transport was a municipal bus operator in Maidstone and the surrounding villages. Maidstone Borough Council Transport was formed in 1974 from Maidstone Corporation Transport following local government reorganisation. In 1986 Boro'line Maidstone was formed as an arm's length company of Maidstone council from the operations of Maidstone Borough Council Transport. The company had a brief London operation. Following financial difficulties, the London operation was sold to Kentish Bus, and after a period of administration, the assets of the Maidstone operation (the vehicles and the Armstrong Road depot and offices) was sold to Maidstone & District in 1992.

== History ==
=== Maidstone Borough Council Transport ===
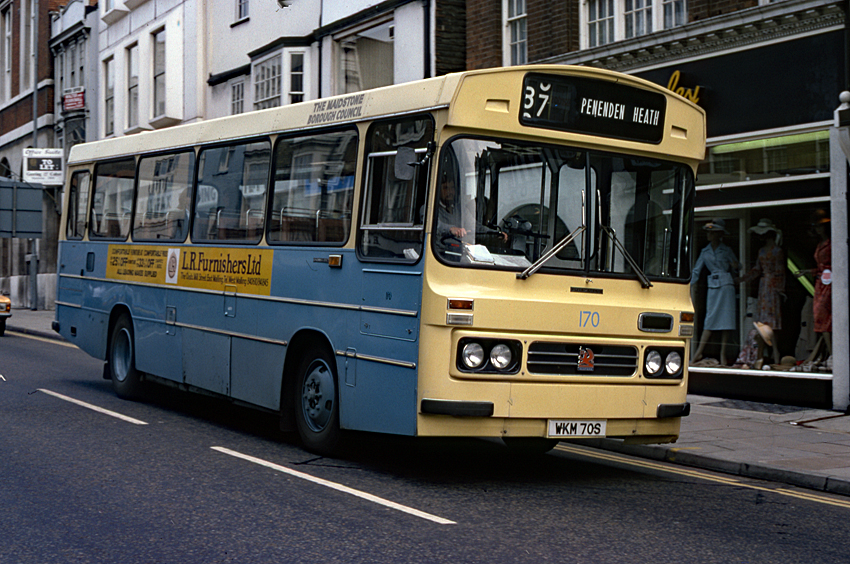
Maidstone Borough Council Transport Duple Dominant Bus bodied Bedford YLQ in April 1980

In 1974, Maidstone Corporation became Maidstone Borough Council Transport, following reorganisation of local government which extended the council's reach into Maidstone. This coincided with the retirement of the general manager of the organisation, leading to a policy shift to replace the fully double deck fleet inherited from Maidstone Corporation with lightweight single deckers.

In 1976 the network was revised following the opening of the Stoneborough Centre Bus Station. In 1977, conversion to one man operation was completed as double deck bus operation ceased. In 1978 route numbers were introduced to the expanding network, co-ordinated with Maidstone & District.

=== Maidstone Area Bus Services ===
On 9 August 1981, Maidstone Borough Council services were integrated with that of Maidstone & District under the banner "Maidstone Area Bus Services", with a yellow on black hop barn motif. This was as a result of one of the National Bus Company's Market Analysis Projects (MAP). The MAP analysis resulted in the major alteration of services, seeing some swapping and diversion of routes and the extension of Maidstone Borough routes outside the borough to southern villages. This also saw closure of Maidstone & District's Maidstone depot in Knightrider Street.

=== Deregulation and London expansion ===
On 26 October 1986, to fulfil a requirement of the Transport Act 1985, Maidstone Borough Council's bus services divested into arm's length, but council-owned, company Maidstone Borough Transport (Holdings) Limited and other subsidiaries trading under the Best Impressions-inspired Boro'line Maidstone branding with a new yellow/blue livery.

Boro'line was launched on 27 October 1986 with a guest appearance from Inspector Blakey from On the Buses.

The co-ordinated Maidstone Area Bus Services arrangement was terminated, as the same Transport Act 1985 outlawed such arrangements, with bus operators being forced to compete with each other in the new deregulated environment. Thus National Bus Company's East Kent and Maidstone & District subsidiaries and Boro'line, along with local private operators such as Nu-Venture and Farleigh Coaches who started local bus operations, ended up as competitors.

Maidstone & District was sold in a management buyout on 7 November 1986.

Meanwhile, seeking expansion, Boro'line saw that opportunities lay mainly outside the traditional operating area. Thus, as well as moving on a large scale into coach operation, Boro'line was, from 16 January 1988, an early participant in the new London Regional Transport route tendering post-deregulation system, running operations under the Boro'line London brand.

=== Demise ===
In 1989, Boro'line posted a loss of £1.25 million (equivalent to £3,307,000 in 2025), resulting in fare increases of 20% in the short-term. Further investigations into the company's finances and accounting revealed a further loss of £1.3 million (equivalent to £2,990,000 in 2025) in September 1990, a result of Boro'line's entry into tendered LRT work. The following October, the council decided to try to sell the company. Maidstone & District were shortlisted as a potential buyer despite their interest.

During 1991, despite successful efforts to reduce the company's deficits, Boro'line began experiencing shortages in funding while Maidstone Borough Council negotiated the sale of the company, with the council ultimately delaying a final decision until the autumn. In addition, facing possible competition from any new buyer, Maidstone & District relocated its Maidstone outstation from Boro'line's Armstrong Road garage to a site near Maidstone West railway station, and registered new routes on several of Boro'line's routes. In response Boro'line started routes to Chatham and Cranbrook, and local Medway routes. This was not successful due to unpopularity of Boro'line's single deck buses and Maidstone & District's ownership of Chatham Pentagon bus station. By September 1991, Boro'line was seeking £1.2 million in funding to avoid entering receivership,

On 17 February 1992, Boro'line's London operations were sold to Kentish Bus for £300,000 (equivalent to £662,000 in 2025). Two days later, Boro'line was placed into administration with debts exceeding £1.4 million (equivalent to £3,089,000 in 2025) as well as £140,000 in pension contributions that had not been paid to investors. Six leading Liberal Democrats at Maidstone Borough Council, the largest party in the no overall control council, later resigned as a result of Boro'line falling into administration; the council stayed in no overall control with the Conservative Party returned as the largest party in the 1992 Maidstone Borough Council election on 9 April. On 29 May 1992, after setbacks with repossession of five frontline buses (including Leyland Lynxes) due to lease payments not being made, Boro'line ceased operations.

The depot, fleet and part stores of Boro'line were sold by administrators KPMG Peat Marwick to Maidstone & District for £975,000 (equivalent to £2,151,000 in 2025). Most of Boro'line's fleet was disposed of by Maidstone & District, who additionally took over Boro'line's services it did not already cover under its competing network.

== Liveries ==
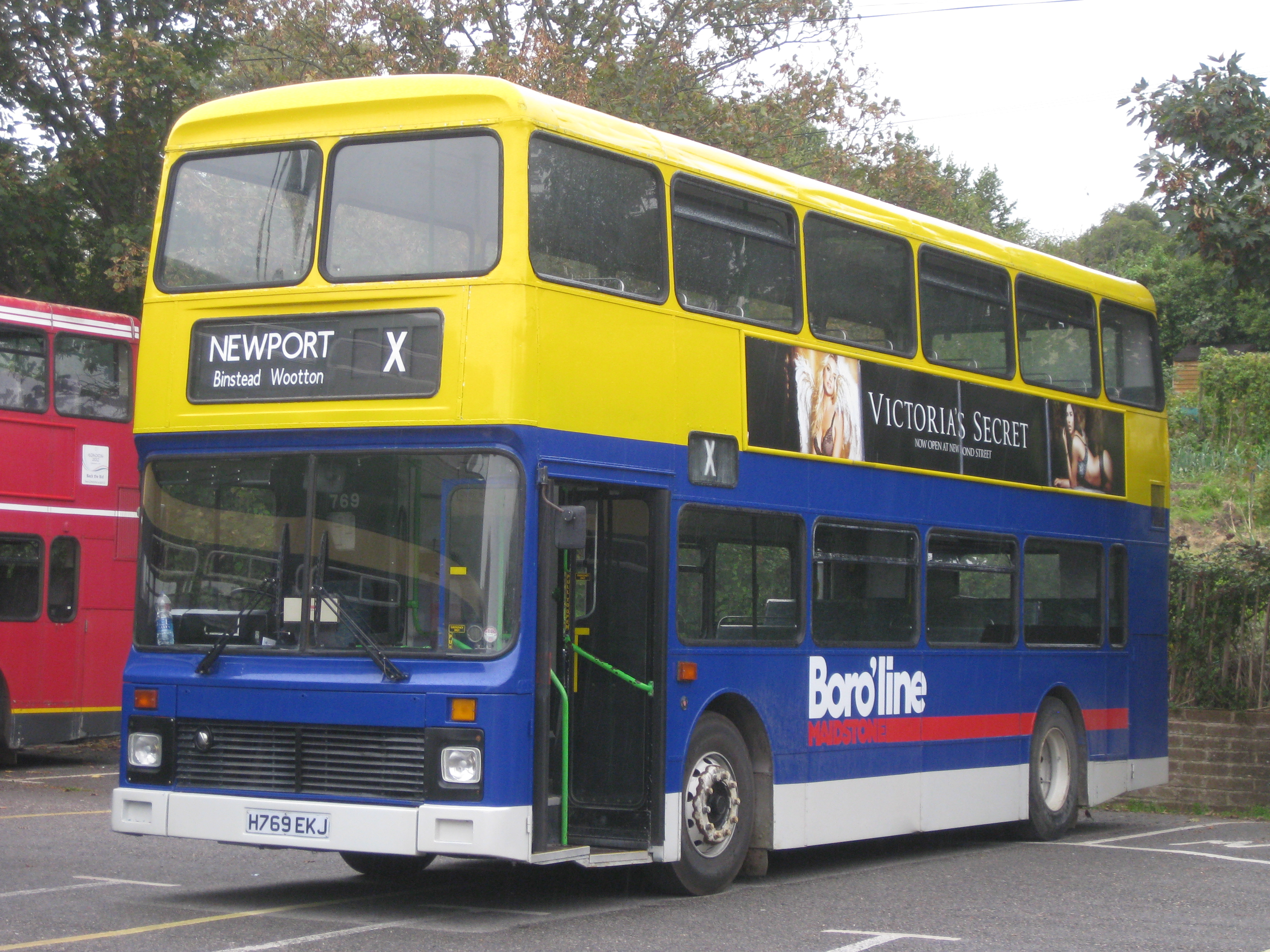
Preserved Northern Counties Palatine bodied Leyland Olympian in October 2016

The fiesta blue Maidstone Corporation bus livery persisted into the Maidstone Borough Council era, with buses receiving The Maidstone Borough Council fleetnames.

In 1979 to commemorate the 75th anniversary of Maidstone municipal transport, the ochre colour scheme previously used by Maidstone Corporation was painted onto a single decker, which later became the standard livery into the era of single deck Maidstone Area Bus Services operation. Notably, most Maidstone & District vehicles did not acquire the MABS logo, due to the probability of the operating from depots other than Maidstone.

Some Leyland Leopard coaches acquired from Nottingham were kept in their original 'Lilac Leopard' livery.

Boro'line was launched with a bold new livery, designed by Best Impressions, who would later go on to design the last independent Maidstone & District livery. The livery consisted of a blue lower and yellow upper base, with white Boro'line logo, red Maidstone strapline and line, with a silver skirt. From 1976 until well after the launch of Boro'line, vehicles in Maidstone could be seen in a variety of liveries, with some retaining either old Maidstone liveries, or the liveries in which they arrived in. Some older vehicles only received a yellow front and Boro'line logos, or blue and yellow base with piecemeal detail application. The use in service of many hired or demonstration vehicles caused many other liveries or white buses with Boro'line logos to be used in service.

Boro'line operated the newly extended and increased Maidstone Borough Council Park & Ride system, which had grown from a seasonal and Saturday operation in the mid-1980s. Thus some Bedfords, MCW Metroriders and DAF SB220s were painted into the Borough's yellow and green Park and Ride livery.

== Fleet ==
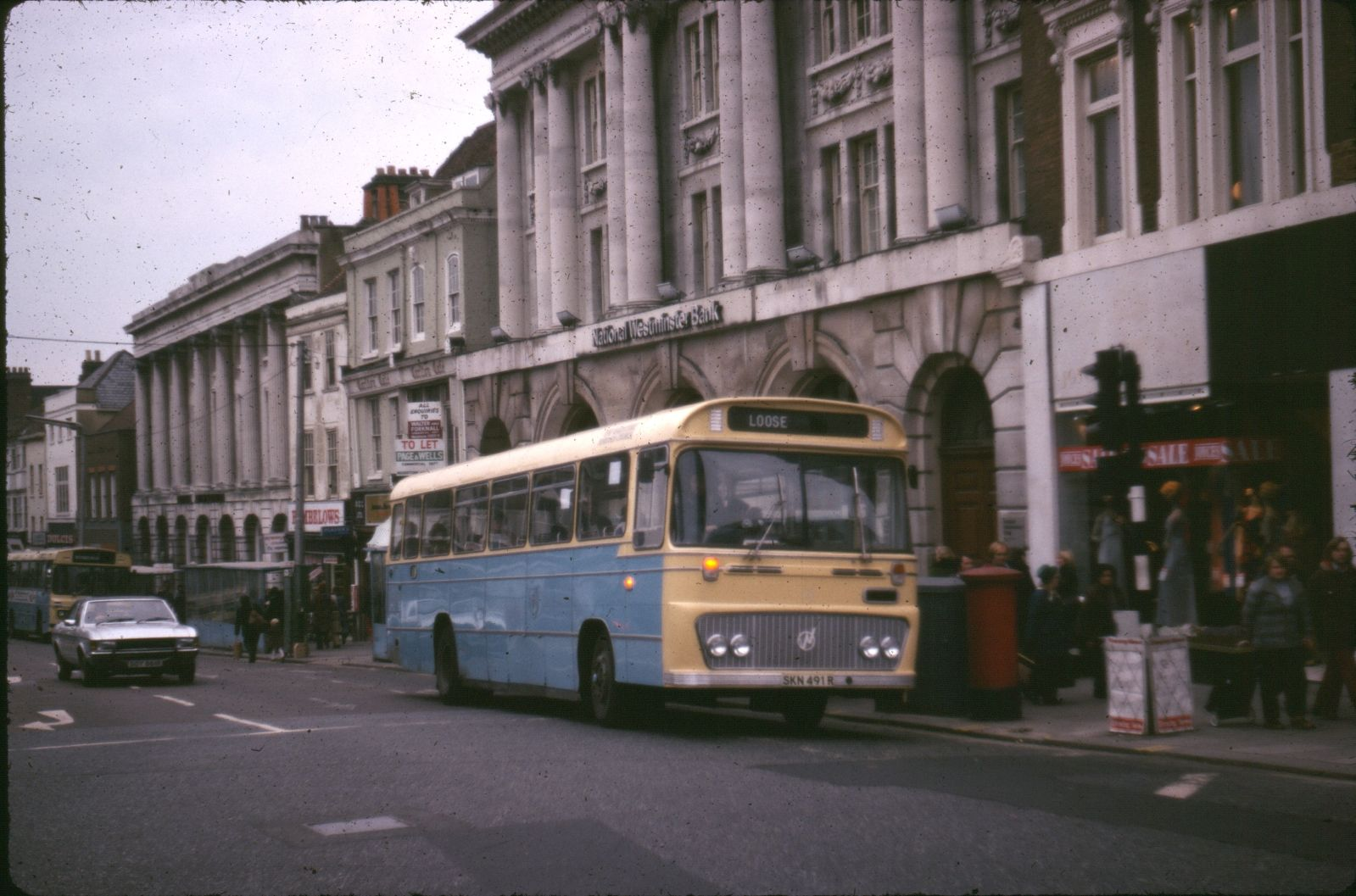
Willowbrook bodied Bedford YRT on Maidstone High Street

=== Buses ===
Following the decision to convert to single deck operation, Maidstone Borough standardised on the Bedford Y series chassis, with mostly Duple bodies. With the advent of Boro'line, with the exception of London contracts, there was no vehicle standard for Boro'line, although double deckers returned to Maidstone under the company. Boro’line purchases for Maidstone were the Scania K92, DAF SB220s, Leyland Lynx, Dodge and MCW Metrorider minibuses. Three second hand Bristol LHs were acquired from East Kent's Ashford operations. Some of the second hand vehicles used for London tenders were later transferred to Maidstone, Boro'line including Leyland Nationals as well as some Volvo Ailsa B55s.

=== Coaches ===
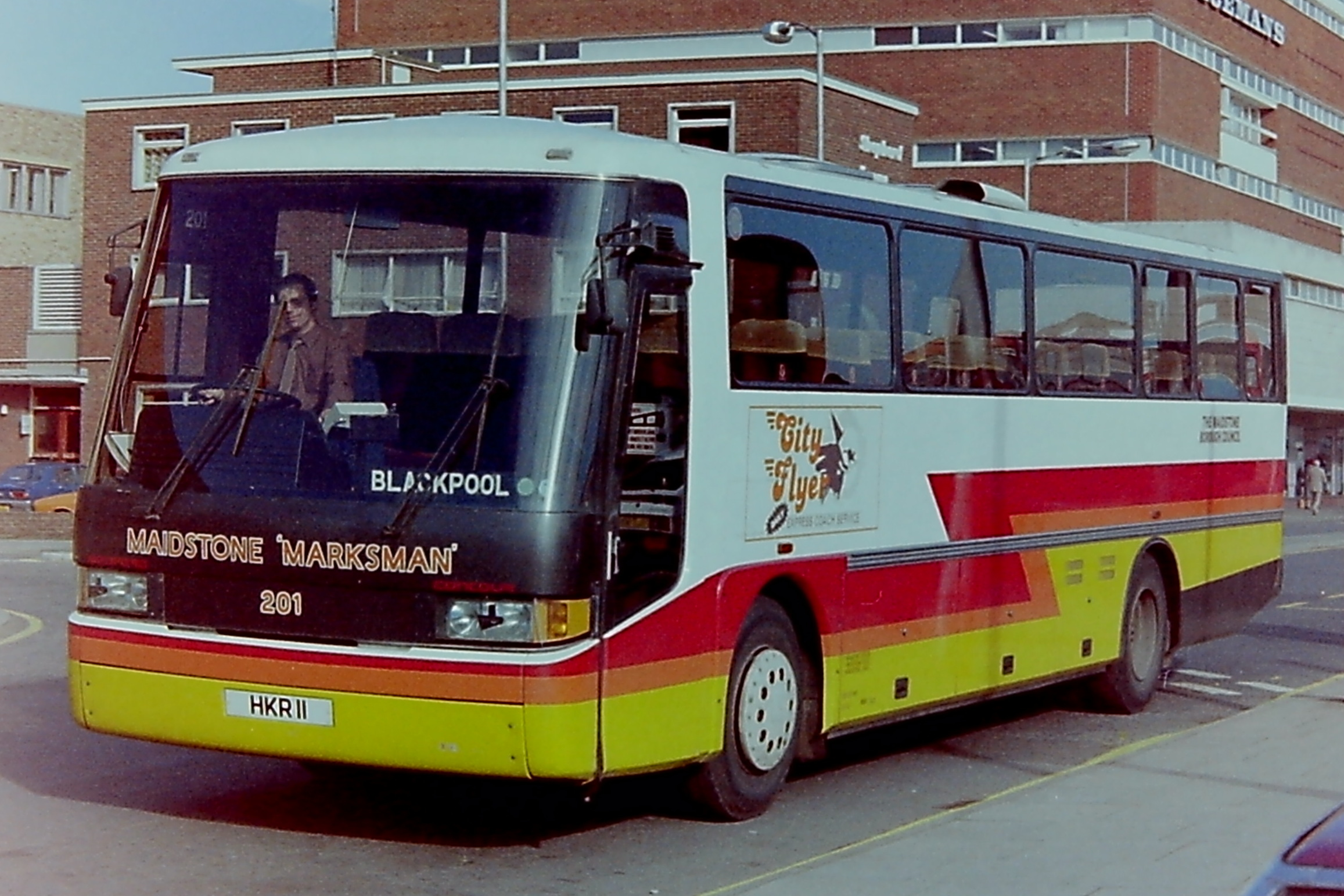
Maidstone Marksman Wright Contour bodied Bedford YNT in Canterbury in October 1984

Maidstone Borough purchased several Duple-bodied Bedford coaches, and in 1976 14 Leyland Leopard coaches were acquired from Nottingham, allowing withdrawal of the final double deckers of Maidstone Corporation. As with the bus fleet, Boro'line operated a number of coach types without a standard vehicle. Some coaches were used for excursions, although many saw service in Maidstone on passenger routes, with some even fitted with bus seats.

Several Maidstone Borough coaches received names:

- Maidstone Minstrel
- Maidstone Monarch
- Maidstone Maiden JKJ 278V
- Maidstone Marksman
- Maidstone Mountaineer TER 5S

=== Rare vehicles ===
- Rare vehicles operated by Maidstone Borough included all of the 4 Bedford JJL midibuses built.
- A Leyland Titan PD3 with Queen Mary bodywork new to Southdown was acquired from a Welsh operator. Re-registered from BUF 287C to 217 UKL, it was conductor-operated on the Park Wood service and also used on contract work, and latterly as a driver trainer.
- In 1989 Maidstone Mountaineer TER 5S was rebodied with a Willowbrook 'Warrior' body.
- Maidstone Marksman was a rare Wright Contour coach body on a Bedford YNT chassis.

=== Ancillary vehicles ===
Maidstone Borough Council Transport maintained a Bedford towing vehicle which regularly saw action in the town as the Bedford fleet aged.

== See also ==
- Boro'line London
- Maidstone Corporation Transport
- Maidstone & District Motor Services
