= London Country South West =

British bus operating company

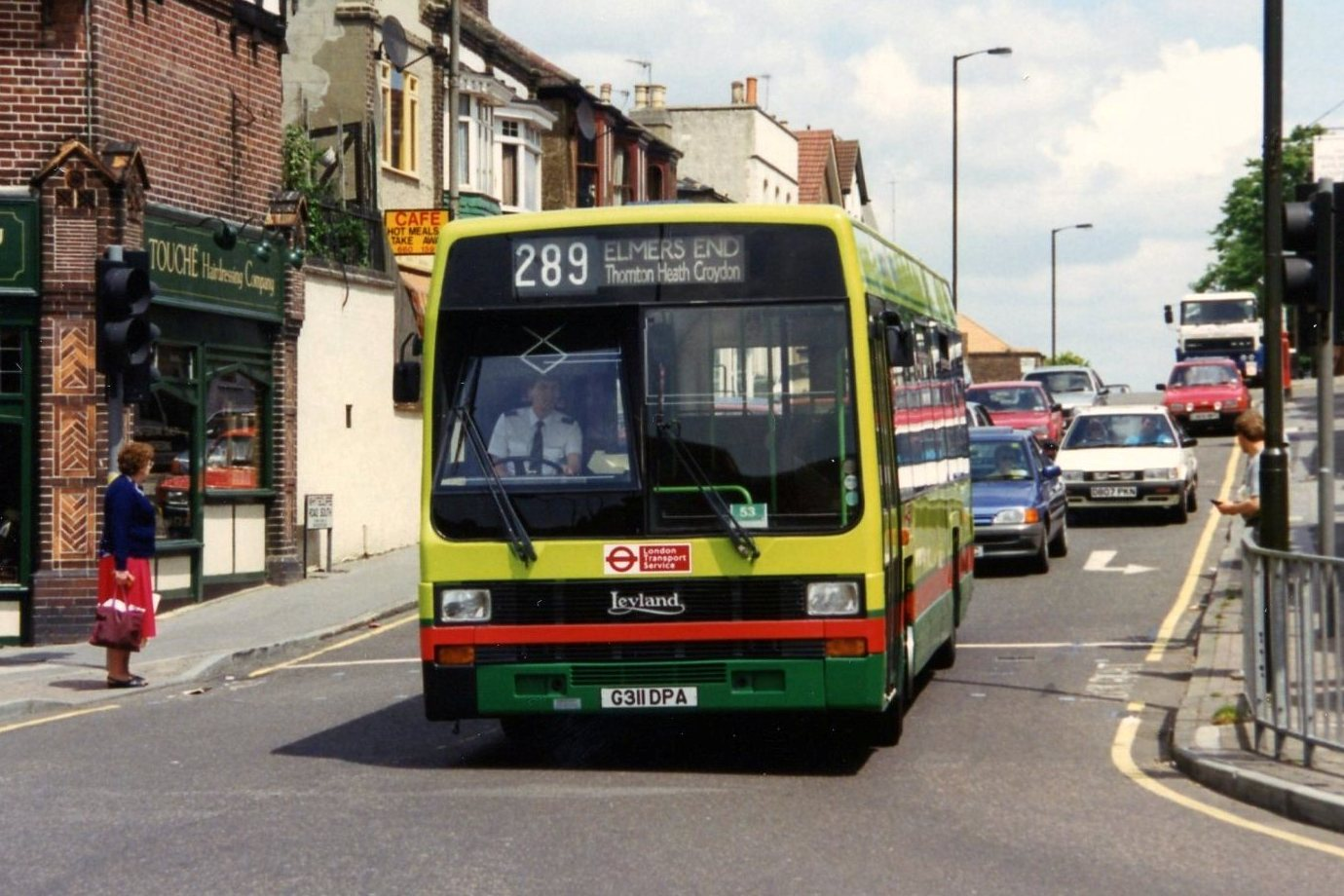
- Leyland Lynx on route 289 in Purley in May 1993
- Parent: National Bus Company (1986-88); Drawlane Group (1988-92); British Bus (1992-96); Cowie Group (1996-2000)
- Founded: 7 September 1986
- Ceased operation: 2000
- Headquarters: Reigate
- Service area: Surrey; West Sussex; Greater London
- Service type: Bus operator
- Depots: 10
- Fleet: 415

London Country South West (LCSW) was a bus operator in South East England and London. It was formed from the split of London Country Bus Services in 1986 and operated a fleet of around 415 buses from 10 garages, with its headquarters in Reigate.

== History ==
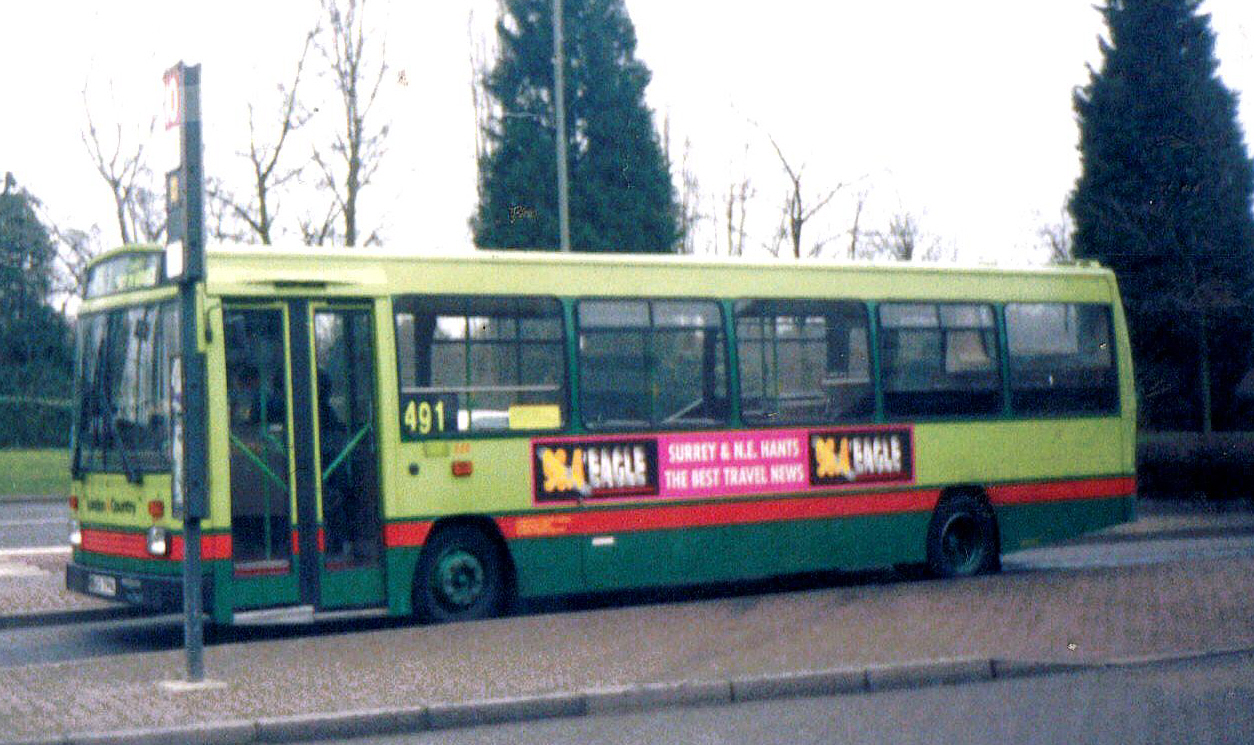
East Lancs EL2000 bodied Dennis Dart in Staines in 1998

In the run-up to deregulation, London Country Bus Services was broken into four smaller companies on 7 September 1986. The South West division contained 415 buses.

On 19 February 1988, LCSW was sold to the Drawlane Group. Drawlane originally intended each of its companies to be independent, but during 1988 and attempt was made to have a uniform identity, and some buses were painted into corporate livery, this however only lasted a matter of some months and it was decided a more 'hands off' approach lead to stronger local appeal to travellers. In 1989 the company began to trade as London & Country, a new two-tone green and red livery which had been used on some buses in 1988 was applied, although slightly differing from the original one with the red line located slightly below the dark green waist band instead of above it and with the new London & Country identity.

Garages in 1989 were at Crawley, Dorking, Guildford, Leatherhead, Staines, Reigate, Addlestone, Chelsham and Godstone, as well as an outstation of Crawley at Broadbridge Heath and the head office in the former LCBS building behind the garage in Lesbourne Road, Reigate.

The company already had some London Regional Transport tenders and it was decided that a policy of gaining as many as possible was advantageous as many garages were close to London. Many being operated by second hand vehicles bought in cheaply, which London Regional Transport had agreed.

During 1989, London Regional Transport had decided that many problems caused by older buses being acceptable for tender was incorrect and required many new contracts to have new buses. The first ordered by London & Country were a batch of Dennis Dominators purchased for route 131, later followed by thirteen 88-seater East Lancs bodied Volvo Citybuses, entered service at Addlestone garage in September 1989, displacing Leyland Atlanteans on route 110.

During 1989, the airport coach operations at Crawley, Staines and Addlestone (747, 767, 777 and Speedlink) became a new company 'Speedlink Airport Services' (part of National Express), with offices at Ashdown House, Gatwick Airport.

In 1990 private hire business was re-branded Countryliner, although the original intention had been for all coaches to adopt this name GreenLine was used for non private hire coach services generally.

The largest London Regional Transport tender block was awarded for routes 78 and 176 in 1990. A new out-station (of Croydon) was opened at Newington Butts, a former BRS depot near Elephant & Castle for the operation of 78 route 78 and part of route 176. The engineering was carried out at Croydon and vehicles swapped on a regular basis. It was however found unsuitable for further expansion, and the former London Transport Walworth garage WL was acquired, following successful tender awards to operate P3 and later 188 routes and Newington was closed. The engineering side of the Kentish Bus Routemasters for route 19 was also contracted out here.

From 1 September 1990 some buses were out-stationed at Kentish Bus' Dunton Green garage.

Also In 1990, to cater for an increase in tendered London Regional Transport services, as well as demands from the new property owners of the garages, a new Beddington Farm Road garage was built, an investment of 2 Million pounds. Chelsham, Dorking and Godstone garage closed and Reigate became an outstation of Crawley for a year or so.

After 1990 the company built steadily on tender gains and introduced new services, acquiring several other businesses.

Acquisitions of London & Country during 1989-1995 were:

- Horsham Buses and their garage at Warnham.
- Gem Fairtax, mainly based at Crawley.
- The former Alder Valley operations and garages at Cranleigh, Guildford and Woking which were rebranded West Surrey Buses and later Guildford & West Surrey.
- Blue Saloon ABC Taxis of Slyfield, Guildford was acquired and merged with the Countryliner fleet.
- AML Coaches, a small operator based in Hounslow and their garage and some buses were retained for a time.
- Stanbridge & Crichel/Oakfield Tarvel of Dorset (1992–93),
- Southend Transport
- Colchester Borough Transport
- District Bus of Essex
- Linkline coaches in North London.

As well as investment in Scarlett Coaches of Minehead (1992–94). There was also an on/off involvement in Tellings/Golden Miller of Byfleet.

In November 1992, the Drawlane Group was restructured as British Bus.

Garages by 1992 were located at Cranleigh, Crawley, Croydon, Guildford, Hounslow, Leatherhead, Reigate, Slyfield, Guildford, Walworth, Warnham and Woking, with buses outstationed at Kentish Bus' Dunton Green garage.

In 1994 the Croydon, Dunton Green and Walworth operations were separated off into a new Londonlinks company, which was itself a subsidiary of fellow British Bus company Maidstone & District. Croydon garage returned to London & Country management in 1997, and in late 1999 became part of Arriva London.

In 1996, with the demise of the National Greenway project, a new garage was opened at Merstham to replace Reigate.

On 1 August 1996, British Bus was sold to the Cowie Group, which in November 1997 was rebranded as Arriva.

In 1997, a new garage was opened at Greenford, intended to replace Hounslow, to operate route 105. Also Leatherhead garage closed and for a short time buses for London Regional Transport contract buses were out-stationed at Fulwell bus garage.

During 1999 and 2000, the London & Country and Guildford & West Surrey branding was replaced by ARRIVA branding.

With the loss of the Redhill Surrey tenders, in March 2001 Crawley garage was sold to Metrobus.
