= Maidstone Corporation Transport =

Public transport operator in Kent, England

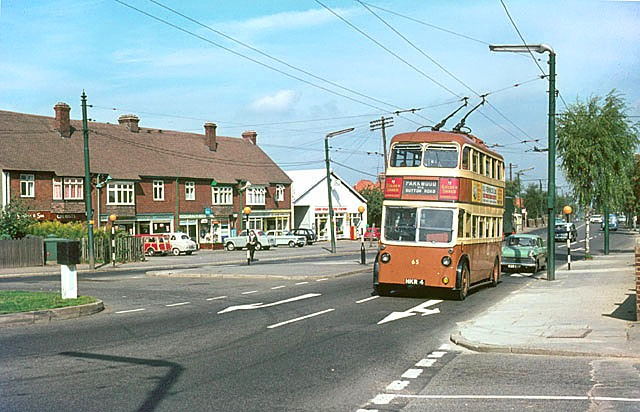
- Sunbeam trolleybus on Sutton Road
- Commenced operation: 14 July 1904
- Ceased operation: 1974
- Headquarters: Tonbridge Road, Maidstone
- Service area: Maidstone
- Depots: 2

Maidstone Corporation Transport was the operator of trams, trolleybuses and motorbuses in Maidstone, Kent from 1904 to 1974. The operations of Maidstone Corporation passed to Maidstone Borough Council Transport in reorganisation of local government in 1974, expanding the Borough boundaries.

== History ==
Maidstone Corporation Tramways began operation on 14 July 1904 with the introduction of a service to Barming, supplemented by routes to Loose and Tovil by 1907. The Barming trams were replaced by trolleybuses in 1928, and the Loose trams replaced in 1930. The Tovil tram was replaced by buses in 1929. The Maidstone trolleybus system was expanded with development of new housing until 1963, when the decision was made to convert to buses. The last trolleybuses ran on 15 April 1967.

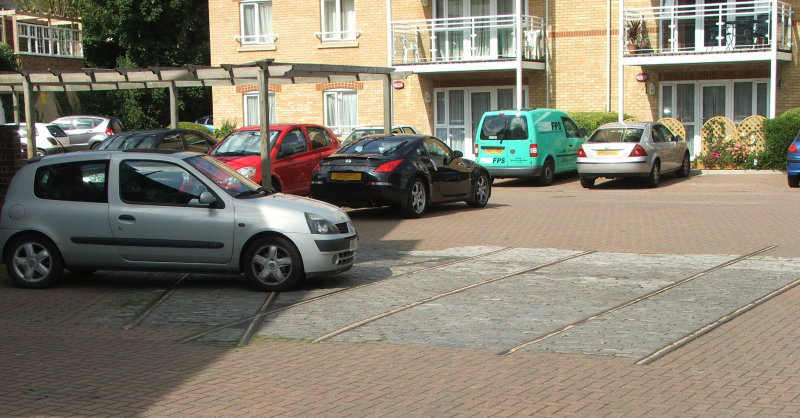
Preserved tramlines pictured in 2009.

The tramway's main depot with its offices and sheds were located on the north side of Tonbridge Road, about 50 metres east of its junction with Queens Road. These premises were subsequently used by trolleybuses. As of 2009 the site had become a residential development named the Coach Yard, but some of the original tramway tracks and setts have been left visible in a preserved central section of its accessway and car park. A smaller tramshed (capacity 4 trams) was located in Pickering Street, Loose, and was also later used by the trolleybuses.

In 1974, under local government reorganisation and expansion of the borough boundary, Maidstone Corporation Transport became Maidstone Borough Council Transport.

== Liveries ==
Maidstone Corporation started out with an ochre and cream colour scheme, with gold Maidstone Corporation lettering and the council crest. A fiesta blue and cream livery was introduced for the buses that replaced the trolleybuses.

== Fleet ==
Maidstone operated a fleet of Sunbeam trolleybuses. In 1959, following closure of the nearby Hastings Tramways trolleybus system owned by Maidstone & District, Maidstone Corporation acquired five of their trolleybuses. Also purchased were two vehicles from the closing Brighton system, including the now-preserved No. 52.

Maidstone operated a universally double-deck fleet of motorbuses. Vehicles showed only destinations with no route numbers. The latter batches of motorbuses were standardised on the Leyland Titan

== Preserved vehicles ==
Preserved MCT vehicles include:

- 26 (26 YKO), a 1963 Leyland Titan PD2A/30 bodied by Massey Brothers
- 52 (LCD 52), a 1953 British United Traction trolleybus bodied by Weymann. Purchased secondhand from Brighton
- 56 (GKP 511), a 1944 Sunbeam W4 trolleybus, rebodied by Roe in 1960
- 72 (HKR 11), a 1947 Sunbeam W4 trolleybus bodied by Northern Coach Builders
- 86 (BDY 809), a 1947 Sunbeam trolleybus bodied by Weymann. Purchased secondhand from Hastings

52 is at the East Anglia Transport Museum, 56 and 72 at The Trolleybus Museum at Sandtoft, Lincolnshire,

== Maidstone centenary of transport ==
2004 saw the centenary anniversary of transport in Maidstone. In commemoration there was a rally, cavalcade and running day featuring preserved vehicles from Maidstone Corporation and other local operators, together with present-day operators. Local bus operators Arriva Southern Counties and Nu-Venture painted buses in liveries reminiscent of the ochre and fiesta blue corporation liveries, with Arriva Dennis Dart 3176 and Nu-Venture Leyland Olympian 100 in ochre and Nu-Venture Leyland Titan T857 in fiesta blue.

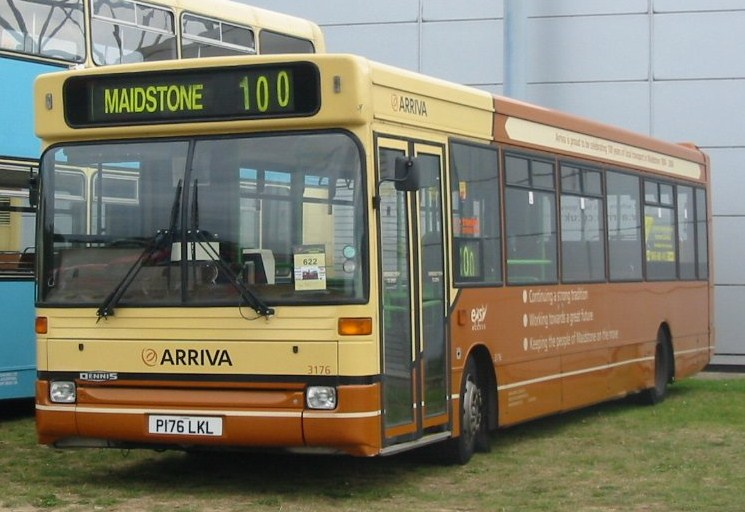
Arriva Southern Counties 3176, (P176 LKL), a Plaxton-bodied Dennis Dart SPD, in centenary livery

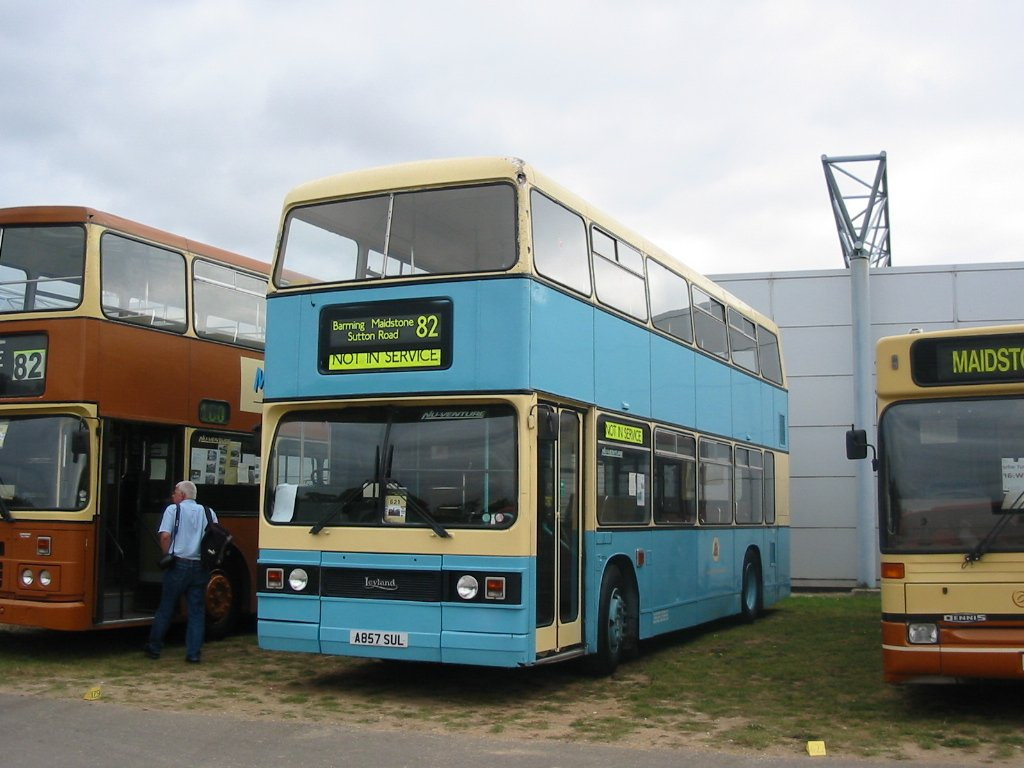
Nu-Venture Leyland Titan T857 (A857 SUL) in fiesta blue centenary livery

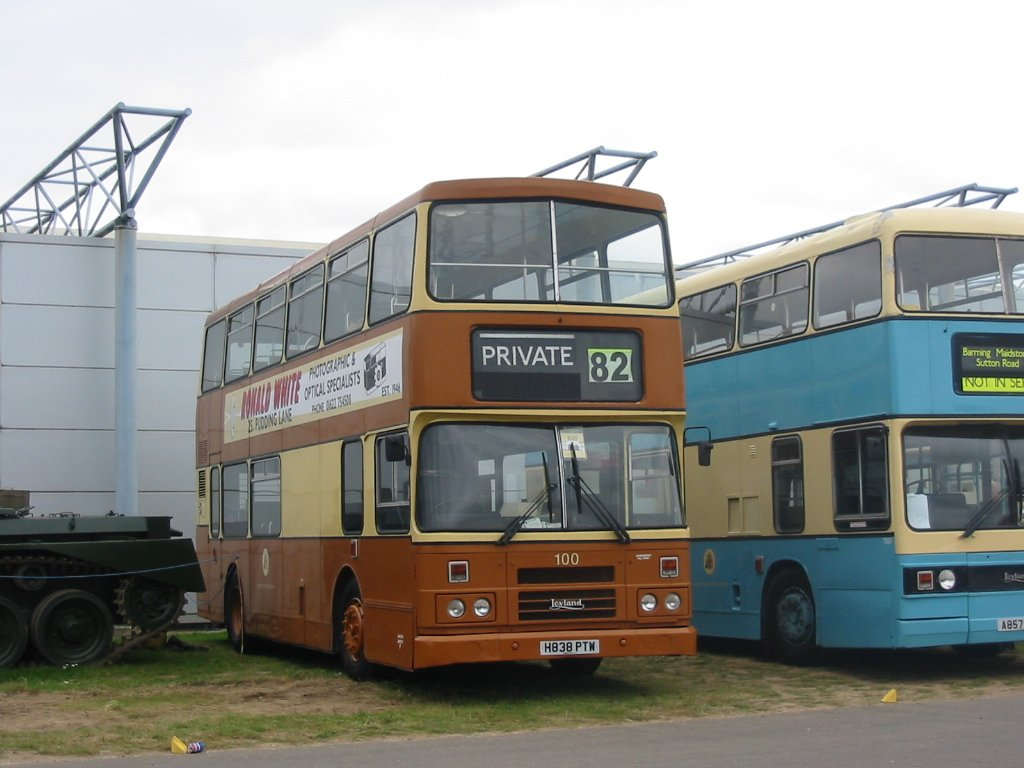
Nu-Venture Alexander RH bodied Leyland Olympian 100 (H838 PTW), wearing the centenary ochre livery

== In popular culture ==
In the film The Lincoln Lawyer, Mickey Haller's (Matthew McConaughey) Los Angeles apartment is decorated with route signs from Maidstone Corporation Transport buses. The termini Senacre and Park Wood are clearly visible as police officers search the room.
