= Maidstone & District Motor Services =

Bus company based in Maidstone, Kent

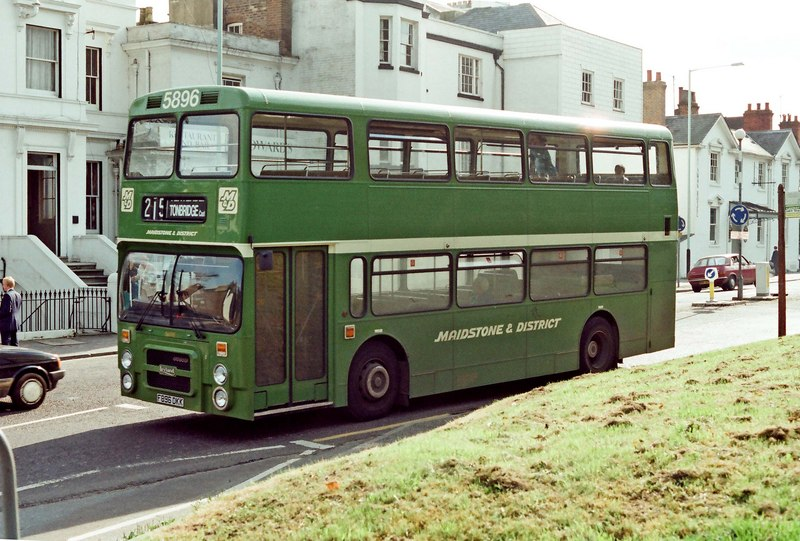
- Leyland Olympian in October 1988
- Founded: 1911; 115 years ago
- Ceased operation: 1998; 28 years ago
- Headquarters: Maidstone, Kent, England
- Service area: East Sussex; Kent
- Service type: Bus and coach

Maidstone & District Motor Services was a bus company based in Maidstone, Kent. The company operated bus and coach services in Mid and West Kent and East Sussex from 1911 until 1998. The company's surviving operations were absorbed into Arriva Southern Counties.

== History ==
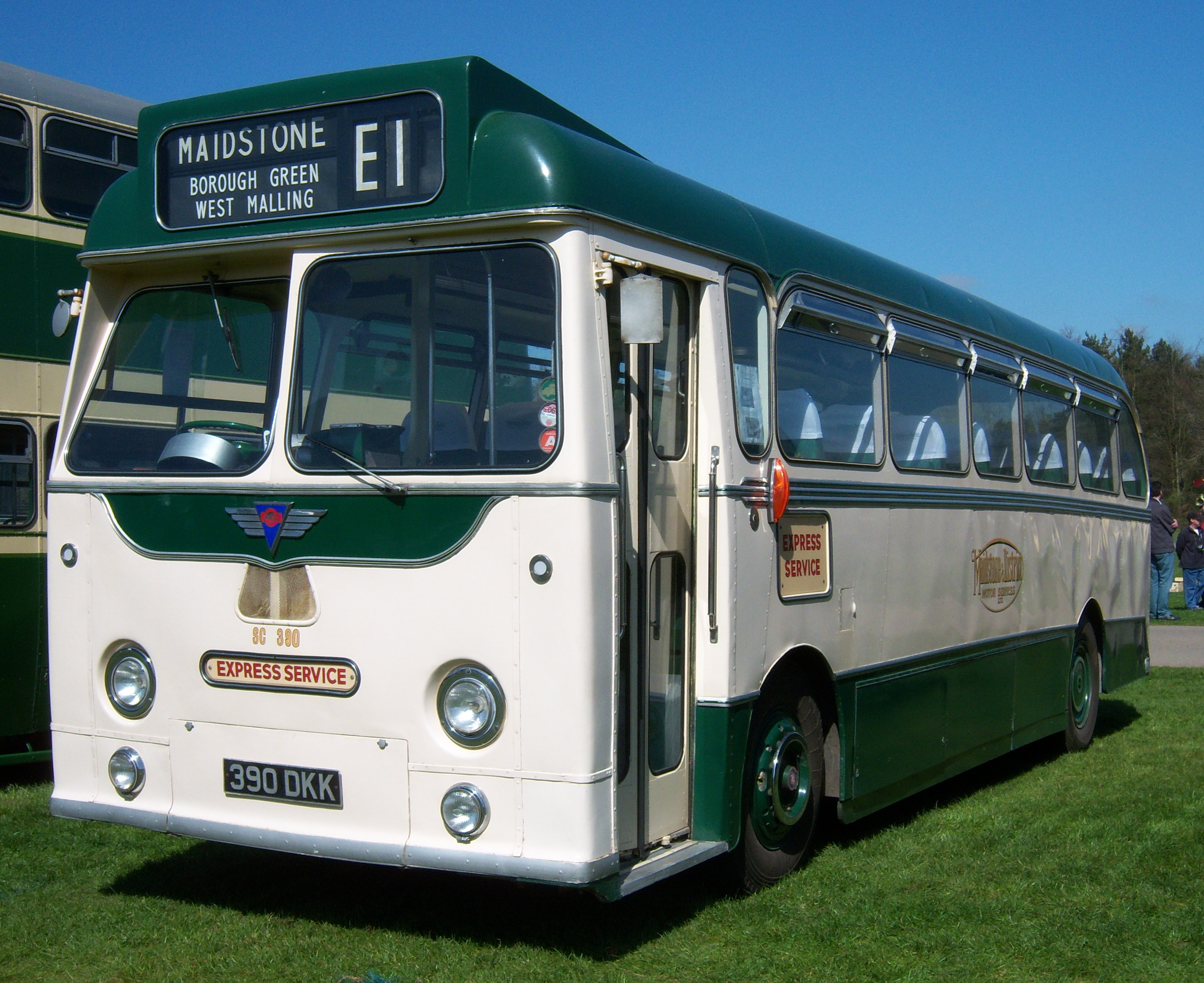
Preserved AEC Reliance

=== Early years ===
In 1908 a hired Darracq-Serpollet steam bus made a trial run from London to Maidstone. A public service commenced a week later between Maidstone and Chatham. In July, a further service was introduced between north Maidstone and the Athletic Ground via Maidstone West railway station. The venture was not entirely successful, and an increase in fares was not enough to prevent the vehicles being re-possessed. In 1910, the undertaking was purchased by Walter Flexman French, who named the company the Maidstone, Chatham, Gravesend & District Motor Omnibus Service. It was registered as Maidstone & District Motor Services Limited in March 1911.

British Electric Traction acquired part of M&D in 1913. A year later, new routes were introduced from Maidstone to Ashford, Faversham, Hastings, Sevenoaks and Tenterden, and between Chatham and Faversham. By 1917. fourteen services were in operation using letters for identification. A later expansion of services resulted in letters being replaced by numbers.

Tilling Group acquired an interest in the company in 1921, while Maidstone & District became a public company in 1922. M&D opened the first bus station in England, sited in Palace Avenue, Maidstone in 1922. In 1929, M&D acquired the Chatham & District Traction Company, but retained the Chatham & District fleetname as a separate operation until 1955.

The advent of the Road Traffic Act 1930 saw the demise of a number of independents, many of which were acquired by M&D. The formation of the London Passenger Transport Board in 1933 required M&D to surrender most its operations in Dartford and Gravesend, together with garages in Dartford and Northfleet. M&D acquired Autocar Services in 1928, keeping it as a separate company until the purchase of its rival, Redcar Services in 1935.

In 1935, M&D took over the Hastings Tramways Company, which brought trolleybuses into the fleet. The Hastings Tramway fleetname was retained for the Hastings trolleybus system until 1957. During the Second World War Gillingham depot was destroyed in a bombing raid in August 1940.

=== Post war ===
As the 1950s drew to a close, the Hastings Tramways fleetname disappeared, the M&D fleetname appearing on vehicles from 1957. M&D made a decision to abandon the trolleybus system and ordered some of the country's first Leyland Atlanteans to facilitate this and continued to buy the type as replacement for earlier smaller capacity double deck vehicles.

M&D also purchased a number of single-deckers for one-person operation of rural services, initial examples being based on the Albion Nimbus chassis. AEC Reliances were purchased until the mid-1960s, when several batches of Leyland Panthers were ordered. At the same time, the Daimler Fleetline with lowheight Northern Counties bodywork succeeded the Leyland Atlantean as the standard double deck intake.

=== National Bus Company ===
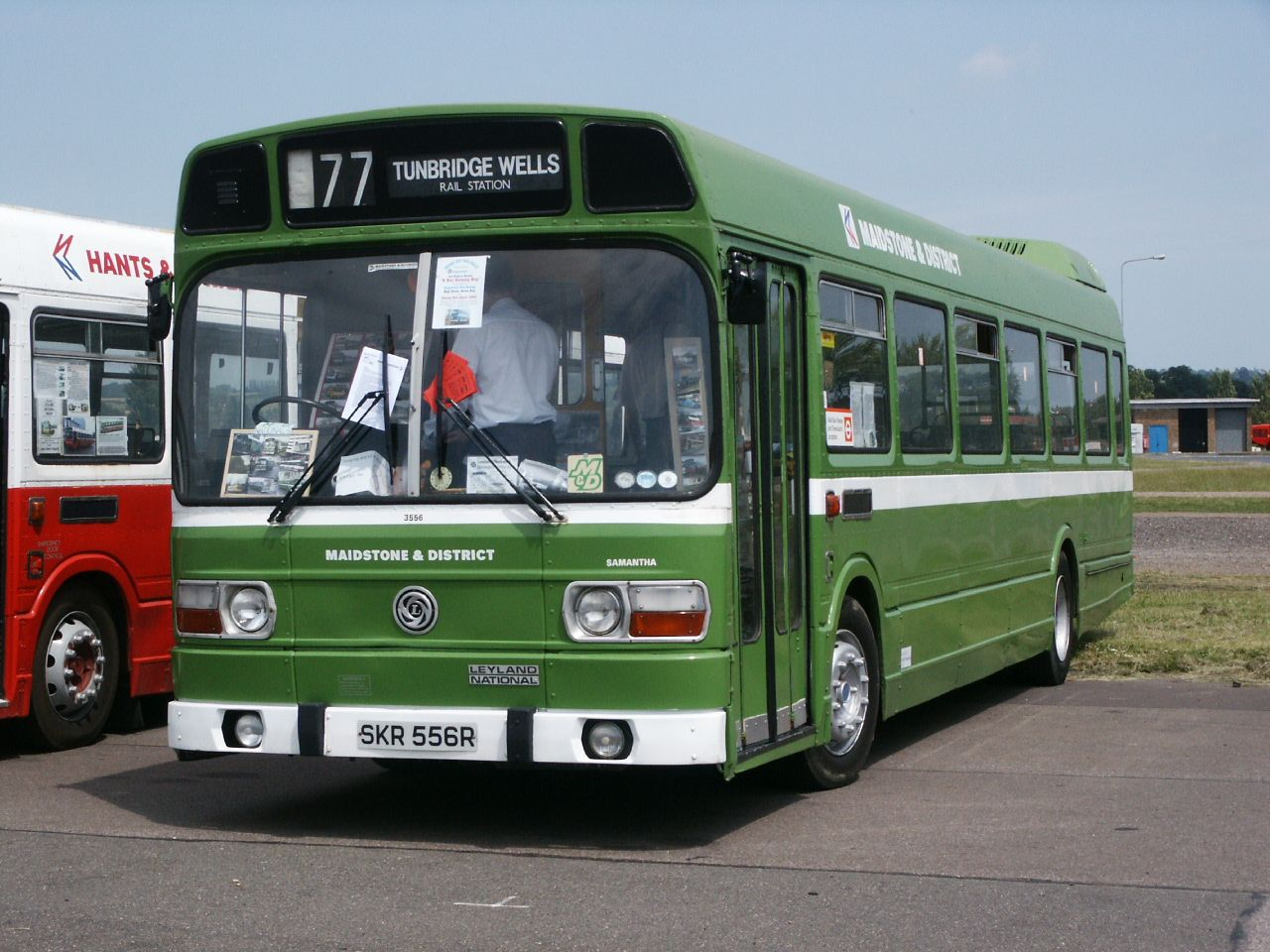
Preserved Leyland National

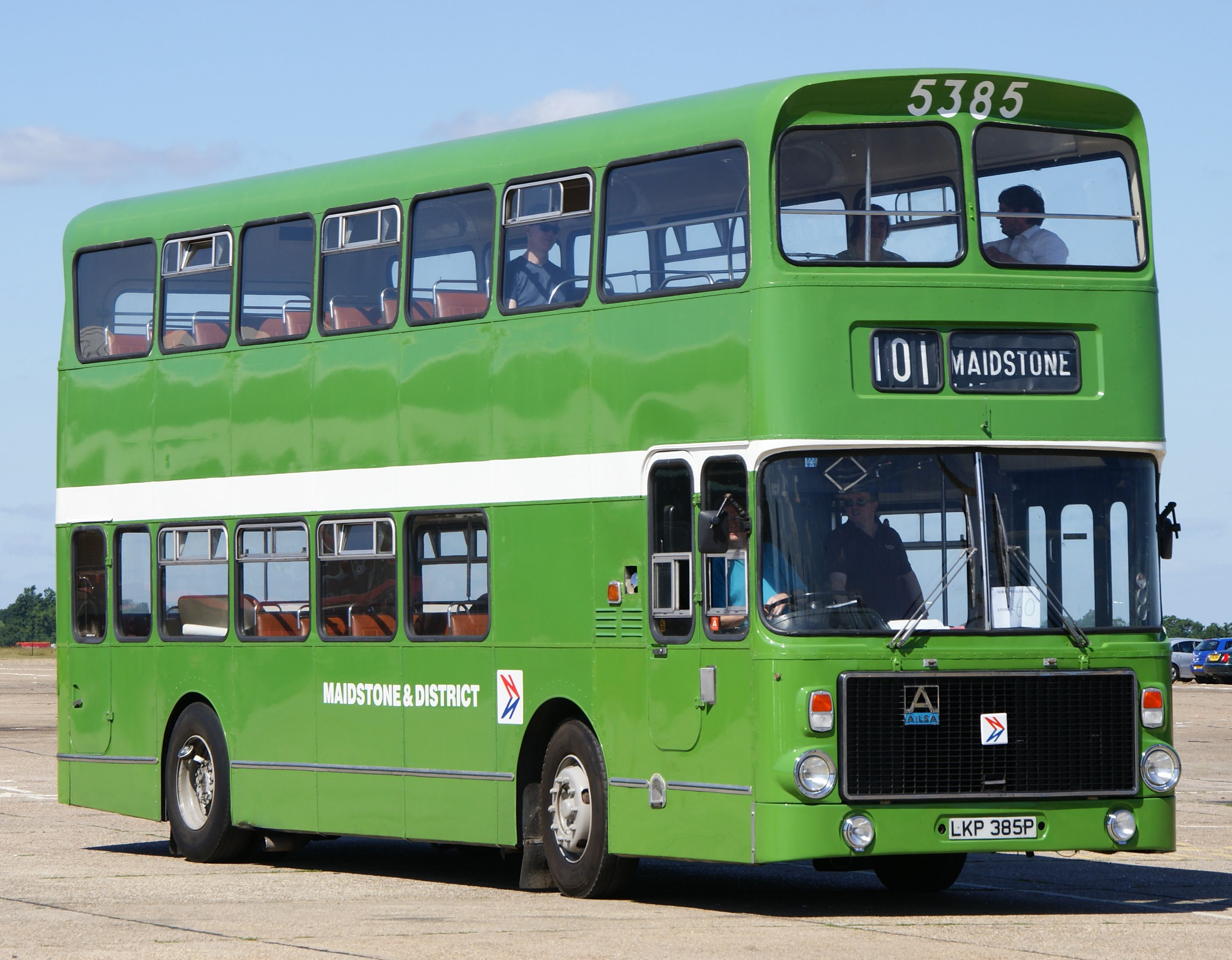
Preserved Alexander bodied Volvo Ailsa B55

Maidstone & District became part of the National Bus Company (NBC) on 1 January 1969. The company purchased several batches of Leyland Leopards for both bus and coach work. An unusual order was for a fleet of 30 two-door Marshall single deck vehicles based on Daimler Fleetline 33 ft. chassis for one person operation in the Medway Towns. In 1972 these were exchanged with similar age double deckers Fleetlines from Northern General Transport. NBC introduced standard liveries in 1972 and the traditional dark green and cream livery gave way to NBC leaf green.

The company made its first loss in 1971, necessitating some rationalisation. To reduce overhead costs, NBC decided to have a single senior management team and amalgamated finance and purchasing functions for M&D and the adjacent company East Kent Road Car Company with the control of the company transferred to the Canterbury office.

In 1973, some services were transferred between East Kent and M&D, with M&D gaining operations in Faversham and Rye and reducing services in Ashford and closing its depot. In 1974. services were renumbered in a common sequence with those of East Kent Road Car Company. Services were re-numbered according to area with most services receiving three digit numbers, the first of which indicated the area of operation.

Vehicle purchases now followed NBC practice with Eastern Coach Works bodied Bristol VRTs and several batches of Leyland Nationals including some dual purpose buses for a proposed network of limited stop services. In 1975, as part of a trial for NBC, trial batches of the MCW Metropolitan, Volvo Ailsa B55 and Bristol VRT series 3 entered service at Silverhill, eventually transferring to the Medway Towns. M&D went on to buy large numbers of Bristol VRTs, although it also took two batches of MCW Metrobuses.

Services in Chatham began to serve the new Pentagon Bus Station in 1976, while Lower Stone Street Bus Station in Maidstone was redeveloped using NBC's standard layout. This enabled the closure of the original bus station in Palace Avenue, although the booking office building was purchased by the Kent & East Sussex Railway and re-assembled at Tenterden Town railway station.

Gravesend area services were recast as part of a co-ordination scheme with London Country Bus Services. London Country took over a number of town services from M&D, and M&D's Gravesend Depot closed 18 months later, the remaining local services passing to London Country's Northfleet depot.

1979 saw the replacement of the former Green Line 719 service between London and Wrotham and the Maidstone - Tenterden extension of National Express 008 with a limited stop service 919. It was initially operated with dual purpose Leyland Nationals. Between Wrotham and Farningham, the service called at most bus stops, taking over three hours end to end. Despite the subsequent introduction of coach specification vehicles, the service was not a success.

In the early 1980s, expectations of a complete merger with East Kent began to grow. Vehicles and operations were interchanged, including some M&D Atlanteans, which were swapped for AEC Regents. In 1980, the National Bus Company's first Market Analysis Project was completed in the Hastings area, leading to the adoption of the "Hastings & District" name for buses operating from Silverhill, Hastings and Hawkhurst depots. Services were cut and Bexhill depot was closed in April 1980. A group of former M&D drivers formed Bexhill Town Bus Services, initially operating a number of elderly Leyland Nationals acquired from Plymouth Citybus.

The Hastings & District operation became a separate company in 1983, although Hawkhurst depot remained with M&D while Rye passed to the new company. Hastings & District was eventually purchased by Stagecoach Holdings, who combined it with parts of Southdown Motor Services company to form South Coast Buses.

The 1980s saw a number of depot closures, notably the Maidstone depot in Knightrider Street in 1981, following co-ordination of local services with Maidstone Borough Council Transport under the Maidstone Area Bus Services banner, and the relatively new facility at Tonbridge. The company's Central Works in Maidstone also closed, with maintenance being devolved to a new company Kent Engineering (based in Canterbury and Hawkhurst), who also undertook maintenance for East Kent.

The express coach services between London, the Medway Towns and Maidstone were re-branded Invictaway in the early 1980s, this name also being applied to route 900 between Gillingham and Gatwick Airport. An all-over black livery was used. To enhance these services, several batches of Leyland Olympians with ECW double deck coach bodies were acquired and painted in a green and white livery. This was later applied to the whole Invictaway fleet.

=== Privatisation ===
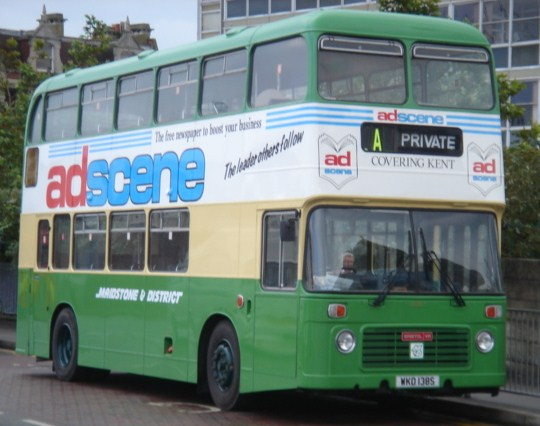
Bristol VRT double-decker bus in the first post-NBC Maidstone & District livery

On 7 November 1986, M&D was sold in a management buyout. NBC's standard green livery was retained, although the white relief was later changed to cream. M&D took a cautious approach to deregulation, mainly registering inter-urban routes which followed major roads. Casualties included the routes serving North Downs villages south of Sittingbourne and Faversham together with the majority of Sunday services. There were also some improvements, including increased frequency on the trunk 70-74 group of services westwards along the London Road from Maidstone together with improvements local services in the Medway Towns.

In 1986, the first of 90 Mercedes-Benz vehicles were acquired for service in Tunbridge Wells and Chatham. M&D purchased Northern Counties Palatine bodied Leyland Olympians in significant numbers post-privatisation. Joint operation of services with East Kent Road Car Company ended with deregulation in August 1986. The long-established route 10 between Maidstone with Ashford and Folkestone was split in two at Ashford, with M&D no longer operating on the route.

M&D initially avoided confrontation with council-owned Boro'line Maidstone. Buses continued to be garaged in Boro'line's depot in Armstrong Road. In 1991, Boro'line was put up for sale, so M&D decided to register a number of town services in direct competition. When Boro'line entered receivership in June 1992, the depot, fleet and part stores of Boro'line were sold by administrators KPMG Peat Marwick to Maidstone & District for £975,000 (equivalent to £2,151,000 in 2025). Most of Boro'line's fleet was disposed of, with the exception of one former Maidstone Corporation Massey Brothers bodied Leyland PD2 which passed into M&D's heritage fleet, while the company moved into Boro'line's depot, which at one point became the head office of M&D, Kentish Bus and Londonlinks.

In late 1992, Maidstone & District was accused of using unfair tactics against independent competitors in Maidstone, such as Bygone Buses, Mercury Passenger Services and Turners of Maidstone, which cumulated in Maidstone & District being summoned to a Monopolies & Mergers Commission inquiry. The inquiry concluded in 1993 that Maidstone & District had engaged in a bus war with competing independents "against the public interest" across Kent, using tactics such as adjusting service timetables to run immediately before a competitor's service, parking vehicles in bus stops and refusing competing operators' access to Chatham Pentagon bus station.

=== Sale to British Bus ===
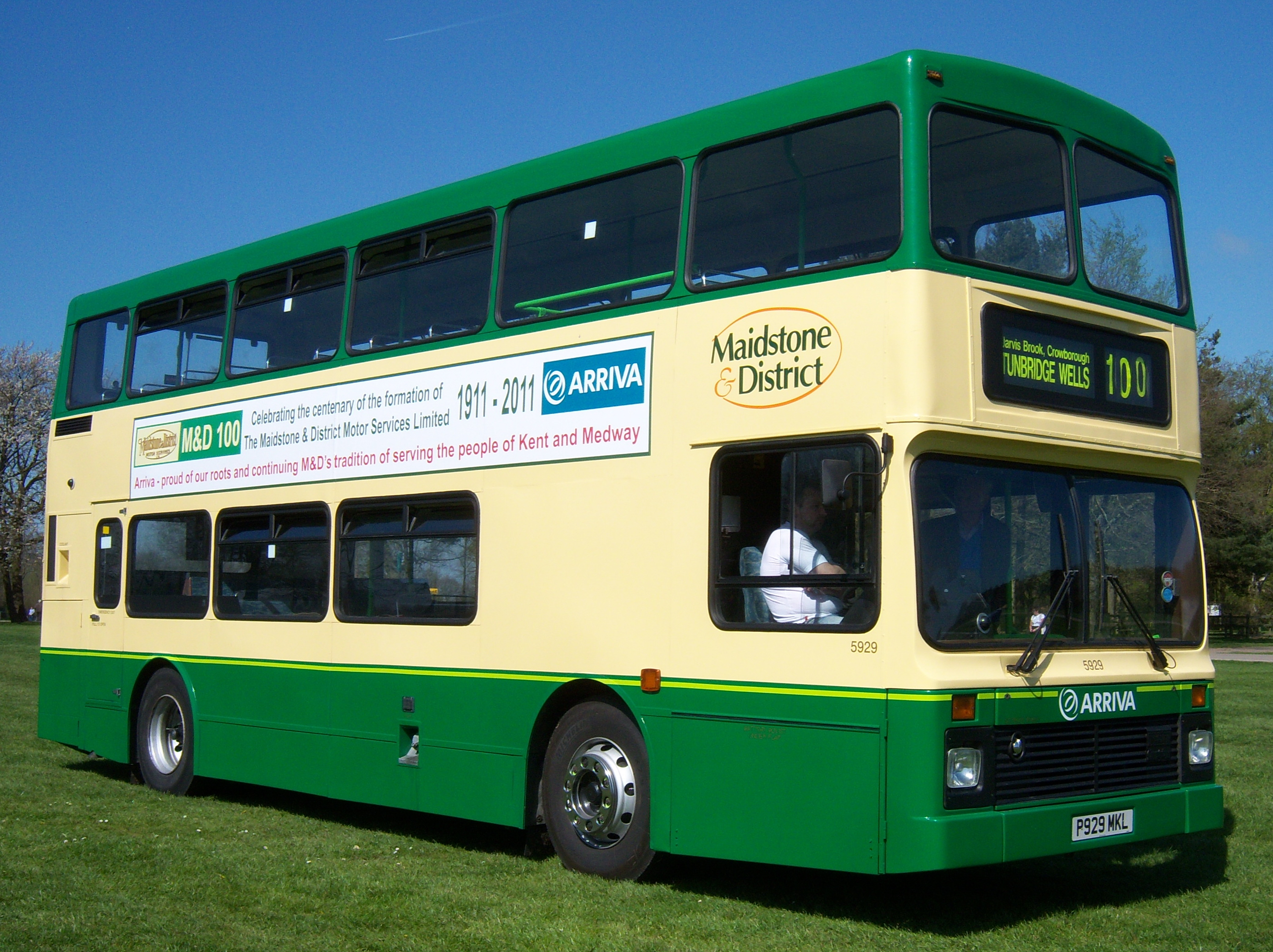
Northern Counties Palatine bodied Volvo Olympian

Maidstone & District was acquired by British Bus, who also owned the neighbouring Kentish Bus operation, for £16 million (equivalent to £32,895,000 in 2025) on 13 April 1995. The Invictaway services were re-branded as Green Line. Vehicle replacements saw Bristol VRTs replaced by Olympians. In 1996, the Cowie Group acquired British Bus. A new livery, designed by Ray Stenning and based on M&D's traditional green and cream including a stylised scroll fleetname, was introduced. It first appeared on a batch of Plaxton Pointer-bodied Dennis Dart SLFs, many of which were acquired under a Quality Partnership scheme with Kent County Council for three routes in Maidstone.

The application of the new livery across the fleet was curtailed by the decision of the recently renamed Arriva group to introduced a corporate livery and rename its subsidiaries. In April 1998, the company became Arriva Kent & Sussex, also adopting the fleetname 'Arriva Serving the Medway Towns', with both now being part of Arriva Southern Counties.

In April 2013 Maidstone & District Motor Services Ltd., by then listed as a dormant company, was acquired by a small Norfolk operator, Dogwood Coaches, the owner of which originates from the Medway Towns. There are plans to reintroduce bus services in Kent under the M&D banner, in association with a local operator.
