= Wright Contour (body) =

Step-entrance coach body

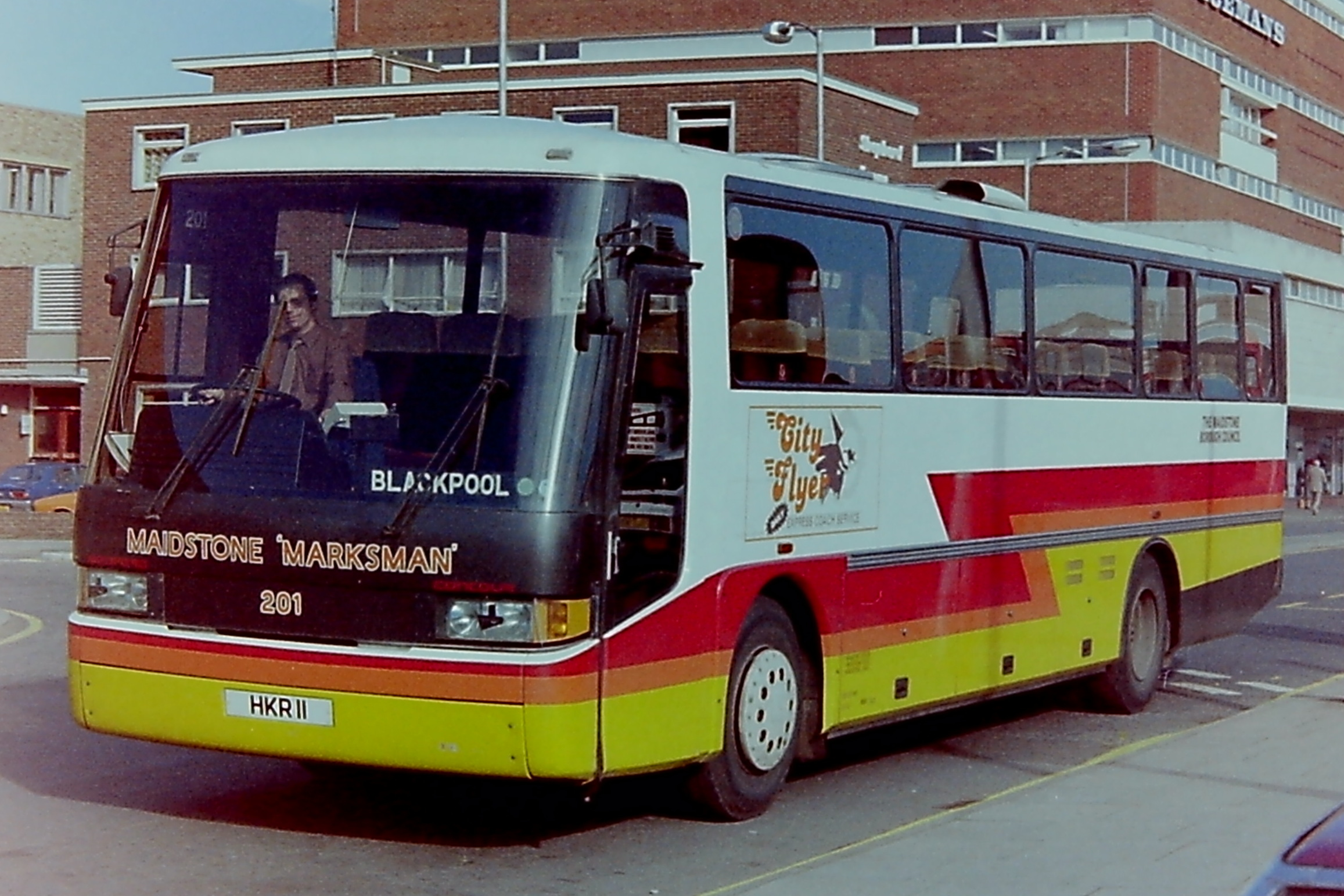
- Maidstone Borough Council Wright Contour bodied Bedford YNT in Canterbury in October 1984

Overview
- Manufacturer: Wrightbus
- Production: 1982-1987
- Assembly: Ballymena, Northern Ireland
- Designer: Bedford Design Group

Body and chassis
- Class: Coach
- Floor type: High-floor
- Chassis: ACE Puma IV; Bedford YNT; Ford R Series; Leyland Tiger; Volvo B10M

Powertrain
- Capacity: 46-53 seated

Dimensions
- Length: 8.4–12.0 metres (27.6–39.4 ft)
- Height: 3.2 metres (10 ft); 3.4 metres (11 ft) (Contour Imperial)

Chronology
- Successor: Wright Endeavour

The Wright Contour was a coach body built by Wrightbus of Ballymena from 1982 until 1987. Initially launched on the Bedford YNT chassis in November 1982 after two years of design and research, the Contour was Wright's first purpose-built coach body, and was marketed towards high-profile coach operators, although the manufacturer had previously bodied Commer Walk-Thru van chassis for touring Irish showbands during the 1960s.

== Design ==
Designed in partnership with the Bedford Design Group, the Wright Contour was built with an Alusuisse bolted aluminium frame, and the fibreglass-moulded body, featuring a one-piece raked windscreen, large headlights with wipers as standard, bonded window glazing and partially-enclosed wheelarches, was designed by Bedford to be aerodynamically efficient. Offered in both standard De Luxe and premium Special models, Special Contours were additionally equipped with plug doors as standard. Internally, the Contour was equipped with carpeted trim, with De Luxe Contours featuring a conventional pivoted entrance door and reclining seats as standard; Special Contours were additionally equipped with a Eberspächer heating system, a Blaupunkt sound system and double-glazed windows.

In 1987, a high-floor Contour, marketed as the Contour Imperial, was launched on the Volvo B10M chassis and also made available on the Leyland Tiger chassis. The Contour Imperial retained most of the luxury features of the original Contour, although it was equipped as standard with a demountable toilet and improved luggage carrying capacity. Only one Contour Imperial was built during 1987, delivered to Liddel's of Auchinleck.

== Operators ==
A total of 36 Contour coaches were built by Wright, with the first Contour entering service with Whittles of Kidderminster in 1983. Most were fitted to Bedford YMT and YNT chassis, but six more were delivered on Leyland Tiger chassis to Northern Irish state-owned bus operator Ulsterbus, with two more Contours built on a Ford R1115 for Herberts of Sheffield and an ACE Puma IV midicoach for Abbeyways of Huddersfield. The last Contour produced, Liddell's of Auchinleck's Contour Imperial, was built on the Volvo B10M chassis.

Production of the Contour body ceased in 1987 as a result of a downturn in the sale of new coaches. Wright intended to 'mothball' the production of the Contour until the new coach market improved, however a fire at Wrights' Ballymena factory destroyed the fibreglass mouldings that were used to manufacture the Contour body, forcing Wright to pull out of the market and refocus on the minibus and city bus market.

=== Name revival ===
In March 2025, Wrightbus re-entered the coach market with both a diesel and hydrogen fuel cell-powered integral coach named the Contour, developed in close partnership with Chinese manufacturer King Long.
