= Massey Brothers =

British manufacturer

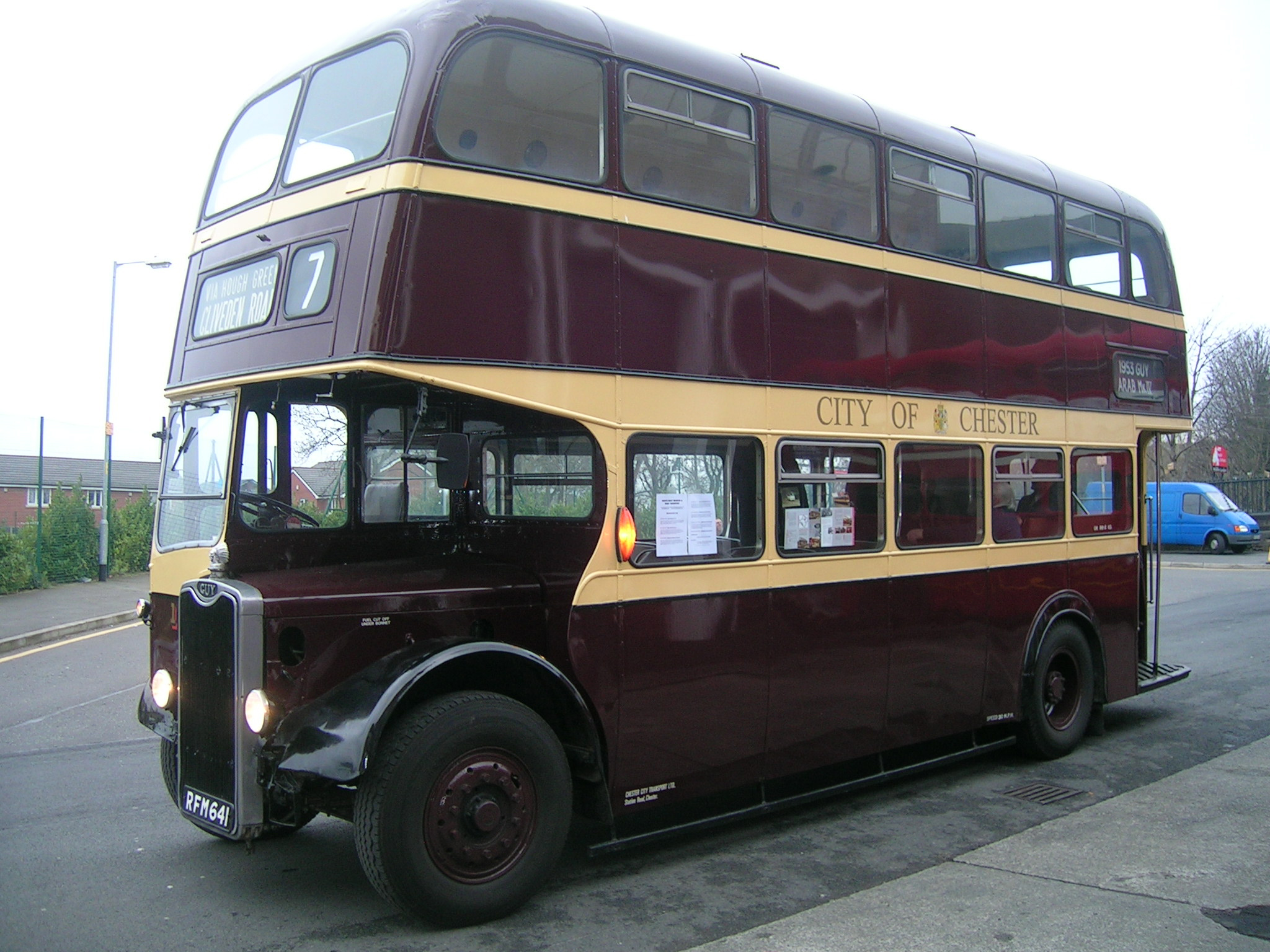
A Massey-bodied Guy Arab bus

Massey Brothers (Pemberton) Limited was an English building and manufacturing company operating through much of the 20th century.

== History ==
Massey Brothers was formed in 1904 by the brothers William, Isaac and Thomas Massey, timber merchants and building contractors based in Pemberton, Greater Manchester, two miles west of Wigan. During the first fifteen years they built schools, mills, cinemas and houses. In 1919, they started with the construction of bodies for cars, vans and charabancs.

In the early 1920s, they were agents for Ford cars and passenger vehicles, Tilling-Stevens petrol-electric buses, and Columbia Six motor cars. A number of trams and buses were built for Wigan Corporation. Their coachbuilding activities increased rapidly, with many new customers being supplied by the end of the decade. Their building and construction activities continued throughout this period.

By the mid-thirties, Masseys were supplying bodies on buses and trolleybuses mainly for municipal undertakings, with occasional orders coming from independent operators. In the late thirties, they built railcars for the Trujillo Railway in Peru and railcar cabs for the Sao Paulo Railway in Brazil. They were very active during World War II, building Ministry of Supply "utility" bodies for many operators in England, Scotland and Wales and fire brigade utility vehicles. After the war, with the need for replacement buses gaining momentum, the company became increasingly busy with repairing and building new buses and the rebuilding of bomb damaged property.

Masseys had an enviable reputation for solid PSV bodywork with their distinctive designs. The building and construction side of the business ceased in 1962, after the completion of some new houses. PSV bodybuilding continued until 196,7 when they were taken over by Wigan coachbuilders, Northern Counties Motor & Engineering Company. A book by Phil Thoms on the history of Masseys was published in 2011.
