= Pemberton Urban District =

Former local government district in North-West England

Coordinates: 53°32′N 2°40′W

Pemberton Urban District was an urban district from 1894 to 1904, when it was added to the County Borough of Wigan. It included the township of Pemberton along with its constituent villages.
