= Boro'line London =

British bus operating company

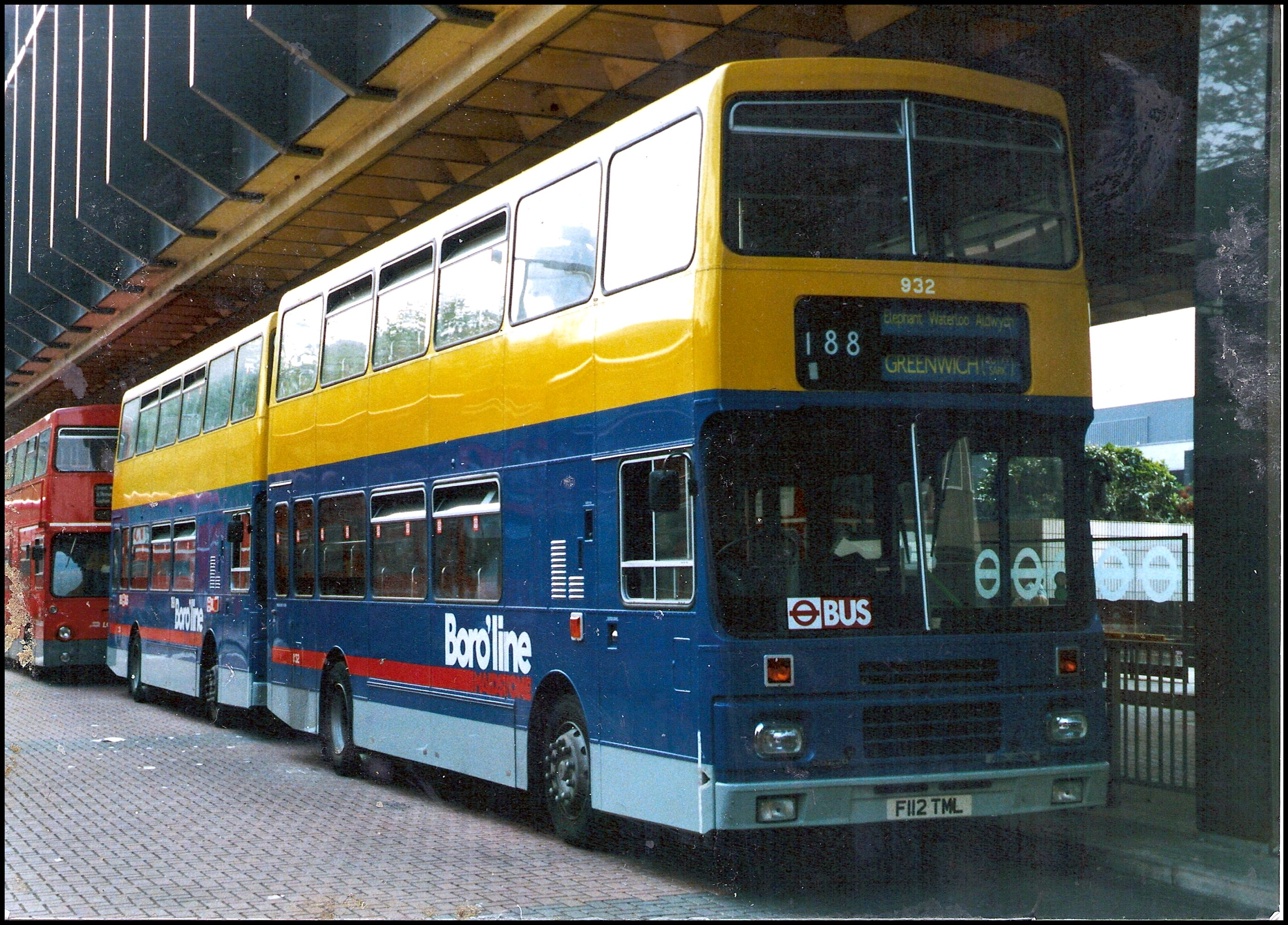
- Alexander bodied Volvo Citybus at Euston bus station
- Parent: Maidstone Borough Council
- Founded: 1988; 38 years ago
- Ceased operation: 1992; 34 years ago
- Headquarters: Northfleet
- Service area: London
- Service type: Bus operator

Boro'line London was a bus operator that operated bus services under contract to London Regional Transport. It was owned by Maidstone Borough Council who already operated Boro'line Maidstone.

It experienced initial rapid success, gaining and operating some of the first services to be contracted out in the Bexleyheath area of South East London. Later services reached Greenwich, Stratford and Euston station. However, the company quickly encountered problems, and on 17 February 1992 sold its London operations to Kentish Bus. Two days later, Boro'line was placed into administration.

== History ==
Boro'line successfully tendered to operate several London bus routes, with the first contracts being won in 1987. In January 1988 Boro'line started its London operations with Bexley-based routes from a Bexley council site in Crayford. Another site in Greenwich later came into use for two Greenwich services working into Euston, Stratford and Lewisham. Contracts were won initially in competition with the London Buses low cost Bexleybus unit. Further routes in the area were gained after being given up by the poorly performing strike prone Bexleybus operation.

Routes awarded were operated with a mixture of purposely ordered new buses, and second hand vehicles. The large orders were in marked contrast to the piecemeal fleet replacement in Maidstone. Boro'line's bright blue livery contrasted with the traditional red of London Buses in the centre of the capital.

Additionally, while waiting for new deliveries of buses for its tenders, a motley crew of second hand buses were hired or bought to operate in the meantime, a large number being ex Ipswich Buses Leyland Atlanteans, bringing more odd bus types and liveries to London.

== Routes ==
The following London bus routes had been operated by Boro'line: 108, 132, 188, 233, 272, 422 and 492.

In 1990 Boro'line lost the tender for route 188 to Selkent due to performance issues.

== Vehicles ==
The vehicle batches used in London were as follows:

Double-deck buses

- 1989 built Alexander RV-bodied Volvo Citybuses
- 1976 built Alexander AV-bodied Volvo Ailsa B55s (ex-Tayside)
- 1988 built Optare-bodied Leyland Olympians
- 1991 built Northern Counties-bodied Leyland Olympians
- 1988 built Alexander RH-bodied Scania N112

Single-deck buses

- 1978 built Leyland Nationals (ex London Regional Transport)
- 1989 Leyland Lynxs
- 1991 built Leyland Lynxs

Upon sale of the London operations, all vehicles purchased specifically for London contracts passed to Kentish Bus. Some of the second hand vehicles used were moved to Maidstone. Ironically some of the London Lynxs later found their way into Maidstone & District colours and then passed into Arriva Southern Counties Kent and Sussex division.
