= Hawkley Hall =

Coordinates: 53°32′06″N 2°37′52″W

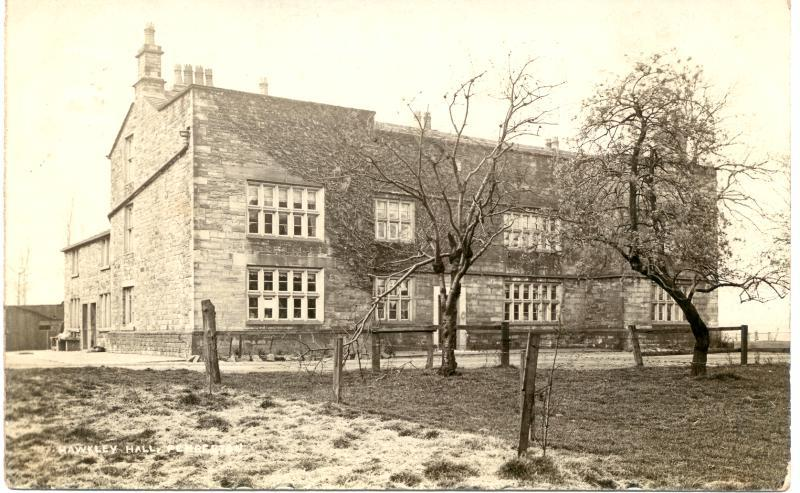
- Hawkley Hall c. 1904

- Location within Greater Manchester
- OS grid reference: SD5704
- Metropolitan borough: Wigan
- Metropolitan county: Greater Manchester
- Region: North West
- Country: England
- Sovereign state: United Kingdom
- Post town: WIGAN
- Postcode district: WN3
- Dialling code: 01942
- Police: Greater Manchester
- Fire: Greater Manchester
- Ambulance: North West
- UK Parliament: Makerfield

Hawkley Hall was an Elizabethan Mansion in Pemberton, about 1.5 miles from Wigan and to the east of Goose Green. The Hawkley's, the original owners of the hall, came to England at the time of William the Conqueror. It passed to the Molyneux family in 1374, who considerably rebuilt it during the 17th century. It once held Oliver Cromwell and his officers during the civil war. The hall was demolished in 1970 and a housing estate occupies the site today known as the "Hawkley Hall Estate".

== Education ==
Hawkley Hall estate has one school, Hawkley Hall High School. It is a fairly large school that was graded "Outstanding" overall in 2009.
