= Hawkley Hall High School =

Location
- Carr Lane; Wigan, Greater Manchester, WN3 5NY; England

Information
- Type: Academy
- Motto: Respect, Honesty, Kindness.
- Local authority: Wigan Council (Formerly)
- Department for Education URN: 138110 Tables
- Ofsted: Reports
- Educational Authority: Rowan Learning Trust
- Head Teacher: Paul McKendrick
- Staff: 186
- Gender: co-educational
- Age: 11 to 16
- Enrolment: 1170
- Colour: navy blue
- Website: Official website

Hawkley Hall High School is a co-educational, non-selective secondary school with academy status located in Wigan, Greater Manchester, England.

== Location and facilities ==
The school's site is located in Hawkley Hall, and can be reached easily by bus and foot. The main building A Block was built in the early 1990s, with the English, Humanities (Excluding History which are moved to G Block), ICT Office, Art department, Modern foreign languages and the schools library currently occupying the building. The remainder of the school was built in the early 1980s, with dedicated blocks for: Mathematics, Music, Creative arts and the specialist engineering block. The P.E. department consists of an astroturf all-weather pitch, Hard Netball courts, an indoor sports hall, and a playing field.

== 19 November 2024 Ofsted inspection ==
Hawkley Hall High School Had Received "Good" In Quality of education, Behaviour and attitudes, Personal development, And Leadership and management.

== Other notes ==
St Jude's Rugby Club, Bryn Park FC and Hawkley Bridge FC use the school's all-weather pitch every Wednesday for training purposes.
