= British Bus =

British bus operating company

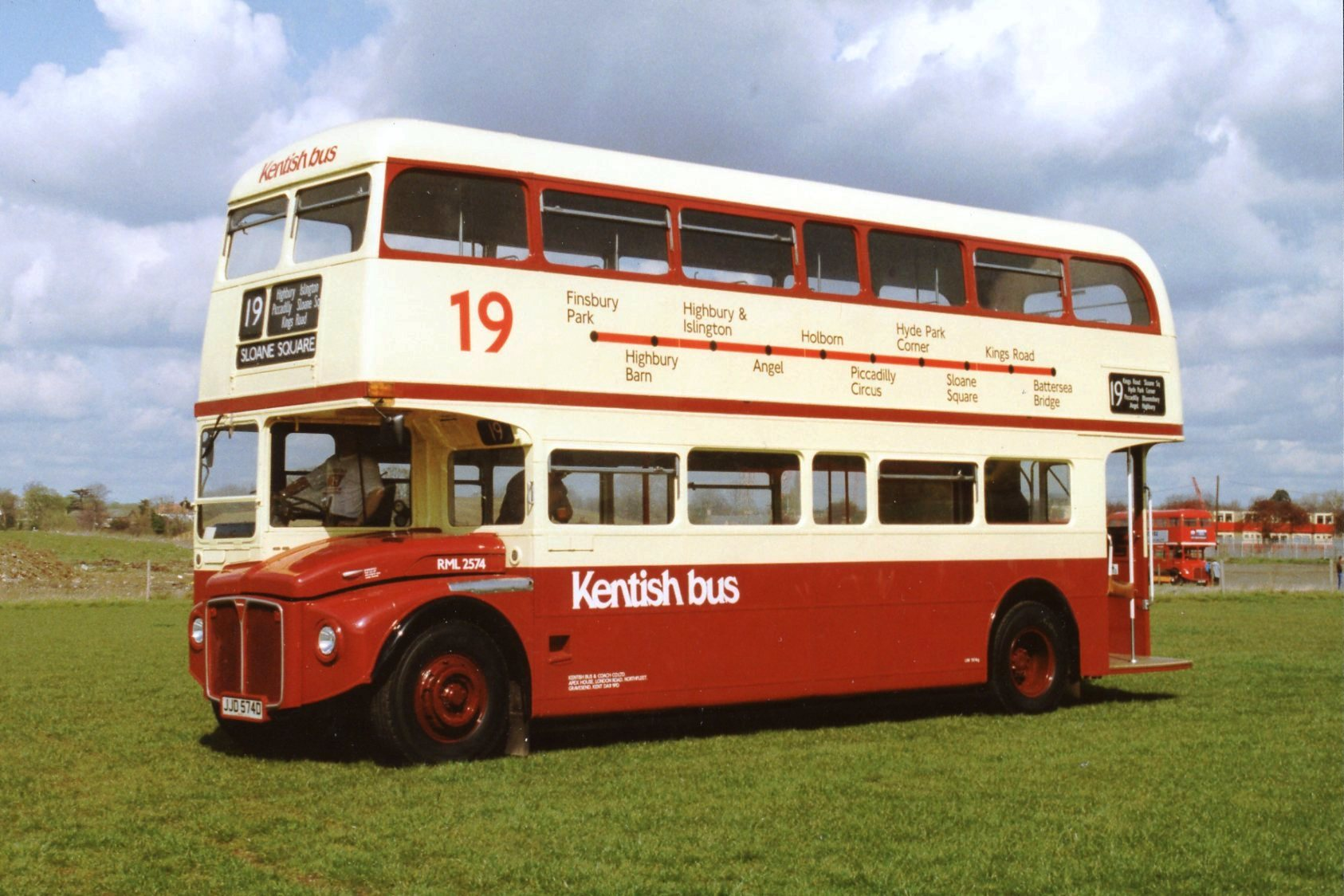
- Kentish Bus AEC Routemaster in July 1993
- Parent: Drawlane Transport Group
- Founded: 1 November 1992
- Ceased operation: 1 August 1996
- Headquarters: Salisbury

British Bus was a bus group in the United Kingdom. It was sold to the Cowie Group in August 1996.

== History ==
British Bus was founded in November 1992 when the Drawlane Transport Group split its bus interests from its National Express in the lead up to the stock market listing of the latter. British Bus' owner had proposed floating the company on the stock exchange, however this was cancelled and the business sold to the Cowie Group in August 1996.

At the time of the sale British Bus owned:

- Arrowline Travel
- Clydeside 2000
- Colchester Borough Transport
- Crosville Cymru
- Derby City Transport
- Guildford & West Surrey Buses
- Kentish Bus
- Liverline Travel Services
- London & Country
- Londonlinks
- Midland Fox
- Midland Red North
- Northumbria Motor Services
- North Western Road Car Company
- Selby & District Bus Company
- Southend Transport
- Stevensons of Uttoxeter
- Bee Line Buzz Company
- Maidstone & District Motor Services
- West Riding Buses
- Yorkshire Buses
