= Invictaway =

Former bus operator

The most extensively used Invictaway logo

Invictaway was an express commuter coach service from Kent to London in the 1980s and 1990s, and was also a holding company for the emerging Arriva group. As a legal entity of the Maidstone & District bus company, after the cessation of the Invictaway coach services, the Invictaway company legal lettering persisted as a holding company for the Arriva subsidiaries in Kent, and some London operations. This company was based in the Armstrong Road M&D depot in Maidstone. This ceased in 1997 when the operations were reconstituted as Arriva London and Arriva Southern Counties.

== History ==
The Invictaway brand was introduced in the early 1980s for the M&D Maidstone and Medway to London routes numbered in the 9XX range, and the Gatwick service 900, along with a black livery. The Invictaway liveries all included the White horse of Kent, as a visual link to the county of Kent, the operating area of the services.

The original black Invictaway logo

The black livery was applied to Leyland Leopards and Leyland Atlantean double deckers. A 919 coach route between London and Tenterden using dual purpose Leyland Leopards had existed since 1979, although this was not branded Invictaway.

The Invictaway branding was applied to the exterior and interior of vehicles.

The Invictaway livery's base colour was changed to a green based livery, based on the National Bus Company's coach livery, and the Invictaway names were reduced in size. Later, with the privatisation of the NBC, the Invictaway livery was retained, with the NBC chevrons removed.

In 1992 the green livery was simplified, with the introduction of some double deck coaches, long wheelbase Leyland Olympians with ECW bodywork, with distinctive sloped top front windows. The forward stripes were removed, and the M&D logo sloped along the leading edge. While the coaches wore Invictaway livery, as part of the M&D fleet, they could occasionally be seen on other local services when the need arose, and were also used on tours further afield. Some of the last coaches to wear the M&D Invictaway livery were a batch of J registered Plaxton 321 bodied Leyland Tigers.

The Kent version of the Green Line livery

In the summer of 1995, the Invictaway services were rebranded into the Green Line network. The Kent version of the Green Line livery initially retained a reference to the Invictaway operation with the inclusion of the white horse. This was applied to two Plaxton Paramount 3500 bodied coaches. As an Arriva group sister company, this was also applied to some Kentish Bus coaches for Gravesend Green Line services, and an M&D Duple Laser bodied Leyland Tiger.

== See also ==
- Coach transport in the United Kingdom
- List of bus operators of the United Kingdom
