= Kentish Bus =

Former bus operator in South East England and London

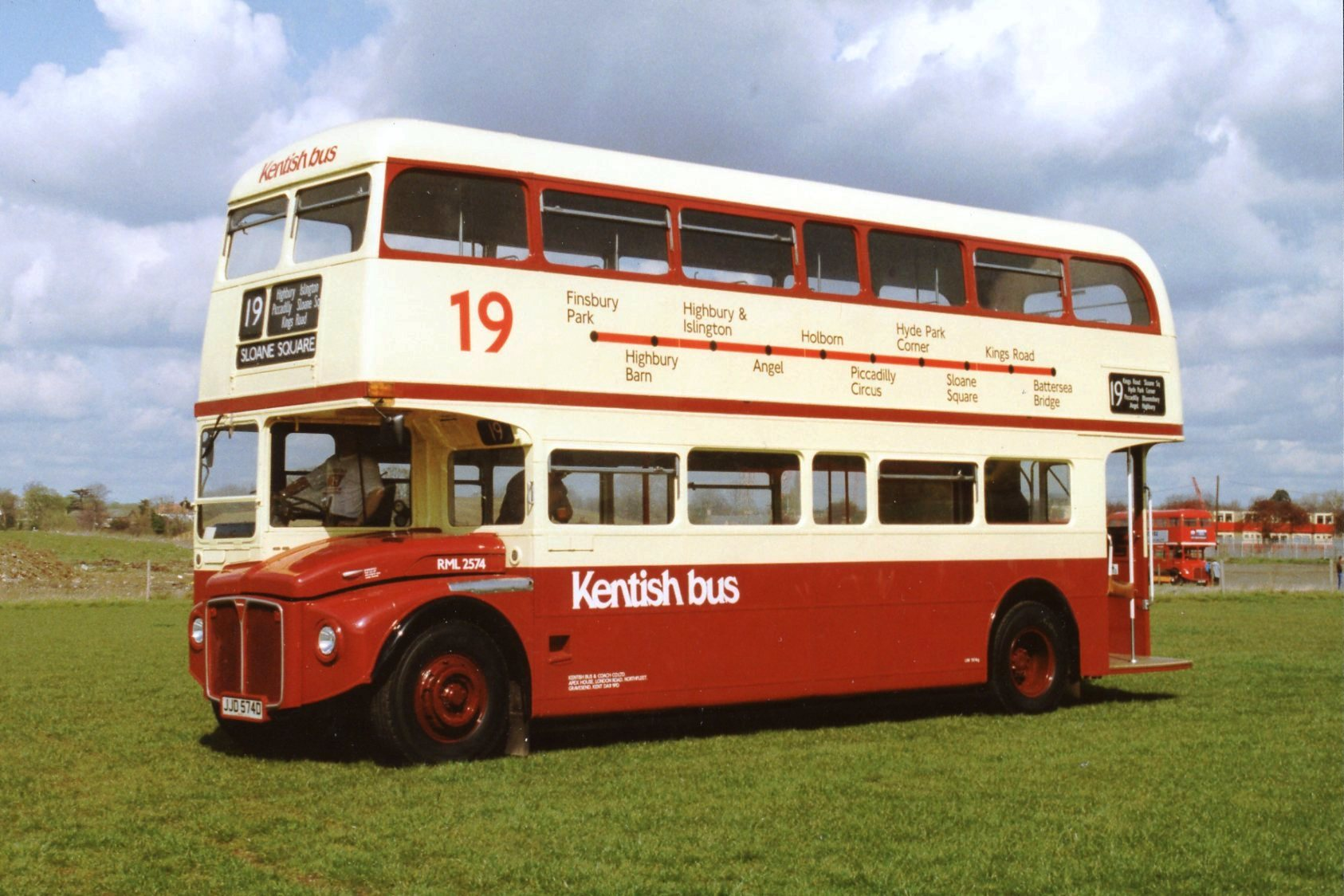
- AEC Routemaster with route 19 branding in July 1993
- Parent: National Bus Company (1986-88); Proudmutual (1988-94); British Bus (1994-96); Cowie Group
- Founded: 7 September 1986
- Ceased operation: June 1999
- Headquarters: Northfleet
- Service area: Kent; Greater London
- Service type: Bus operator
- Depots: 4
- Fleet: 169

Kentish Bus was a bus operator in South East England and London. It was formed from the split of London Country Bus Services in 1986 as London Country South East (LCSE) and operated a fleet of around 170 buses from four garages, with its headquarters located in Northfleet, subsequently rebranding to Kentish Bus in 1987. Its former garages and operations now form part of Arriva Southern Counties and Arriva London.

== Formation and early history ==
In the run-up to deregulation, London Country Bus Services was broken into four smaller companies on 7 September 1986.

London Country South East was the smallest of the four, with just 169 buses and garages in Dartford, Dunton Green, Northfleet and Swanley, with some London Regional Transport contracts operated from the former National Travel garages in Victoria and Catford, with the head office in an office in Dartford.

Bill Gunning, the former Traffic Manager of London Country Bus Services, became the new company's managing director. The company was renamed Kentish Bus & Coach in April 1987, and a new maroon and cream livery, loosely based on the colours of the erstwhile Colchester Corporation Transport, replaced the former London Country green. The head office was relocated to Northfleet.

== 1988-1994: Proudmutual ==
On 15 March 1988, Kentish Bus was sold to Proudmutual Limited, the management buyout who already owned Northumbria Motor Services.

The company expanded its London operations significantly with a series of contract wins and acquisitions. The largest win was of London routes 22A, 22B and 55, taken from London Forest on 20 January 1990 with 43 new dual-door Northern Counties bodied Leyland Olympians were bought to operate the routes. Outside of London, the competing operations of Northfleet-based Mini Metro were taken over in January 1990.

In February 1992, Kentish Bus purchased seven contracted routes and 50 vehicles from Boro'line. These were initially operated from the former Boro'line garage in Crayford; the majority later moved to Dartford, although some also operated from the former London Forest Ash Grove garage, which was also used for routes 22A, 22B and 55.

In early 1993, Kentish Bus gained work in the south-east London and ordered 65 new buses to cover the workings; this took the fleet size to 352, more than double its size in 1986. One of the routes gained was route 19, for which the company leased refurbished AEC Routemasters from London Regional Transport. Kentish Bus was the first operator other than a former London Buses subsidiary, to win a contract for a Routemaster operated route, and introduced its maroon and cream livery in place of London red.

By August 1993, Kentish Bus had become the largest independent operator of London contracts. Further expansion came in November 1993, when two London contracts and six minor commercial routes, along with 23 buses, were taken over from Transcity Buses.

== 1994-1997: British Bus and Cowie Group ==
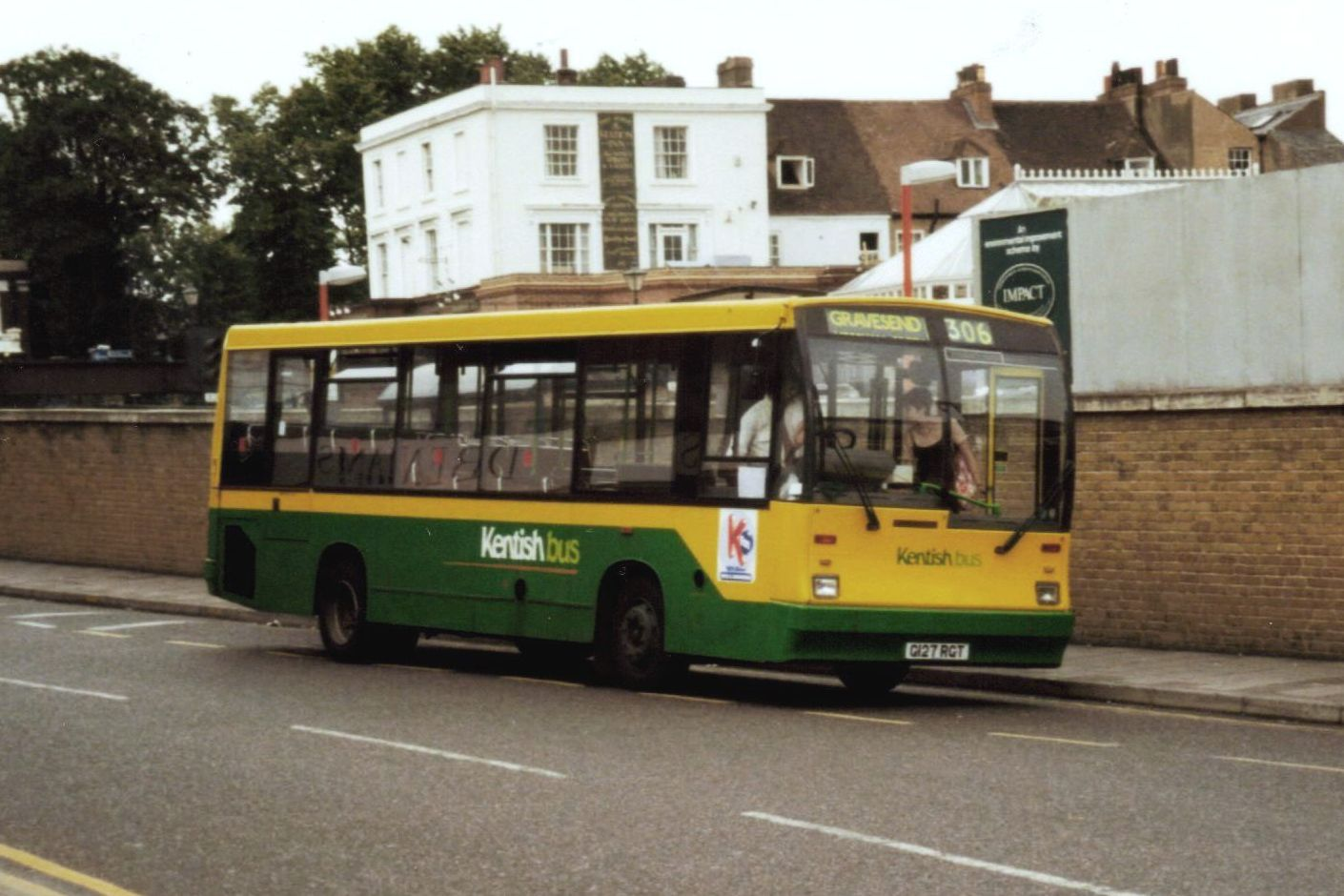
Carlyle bodied Dennis Dart in the short-lived green and yellow livery on route 306 in Gravesend in July 1996

In July 1994, the fast-expanding British Bus group purchased Proudmutual. British Bus already owned neighbouring operator London & Country (successor to London Country South West), and in January 1995 London & Country's contracted operations at Croydon, Walworth and Dunton Green garages were split into a new company, Londonlinks, which was run from Kentish Bus' Northfleet garage.

When Maidstone & District was also acquired by British Bus in April 1995, the three companies were put under the control of a single holding company, Invictaway, which was based at Maidstone & District's head office in Maidstone. A new livery of green and yellow was also introduced to Kentish Bus.

On 1 August 1996, British Bus was purchased by the Cowie Group in a deal which brought three of the four segments of London Country Bus Services back under common ownership.

== Rebranding and subsequent history ==
In November 1997, the Cowie Group was rebranded as Arriva. With that, the bus operations were rationalised as follows:

Former Operation	Operations
Invictaway	Absorbed into Arriva Southern Counties
Dartford and Northfleet garages	Absorbed into Arriva Kent Thameside
Tunbridge Wells	Merged with the most of Maidstone & District's operation as Arriva Kent & Sussex
LondonLinks (Croydon)	Merged with London & Country (London Country South West) to form Arriva London.
Ash Grove garage	Closed down.
