= County Borough of Wigan =

Former local government district in North-West England

Coordinates: 53°32′N 2°38′W

- History
  - Created: 1889
  - Abolished: 1974
  - Succeeded by: Metropolitan Borough of Wigan
- Status: County borough

The County Borough of Wigan was, from 1889 to 1974, a local government district centred on Wigan in the northwest of England. It was alternatively known as Wigan County Borough.

The district was created by the Local Government Act 1888, with its boundaries based upon the earlier Municipal Borough of Wigan.

The adjacent township of Pemberton constituted the Pemberton Urban District from 1894 to 1904, when it became part of the county borough of Wigan. In 1920, the Pemberton parish was abolished and its former area was used to enlarge the Wigan parish, making the areas of the parish and county borough identical.

As part of the terms of any county borough in England, it was decided that to let the then Lancashire County Council have authority over Wigan would be impractical due to its large size, population and industry, and so the district was independent from the administrative county of Lancashire it would otherwise have been part of.

The County Borough of Wigan was abolished by the Local Government Act 1972 and its territory transferred to Greater Manchester to form part of the Metropolitan Borough of Wigan.
