= East Kent Road Car Company =

British bus operating company

Logo as part of the National Bus Company

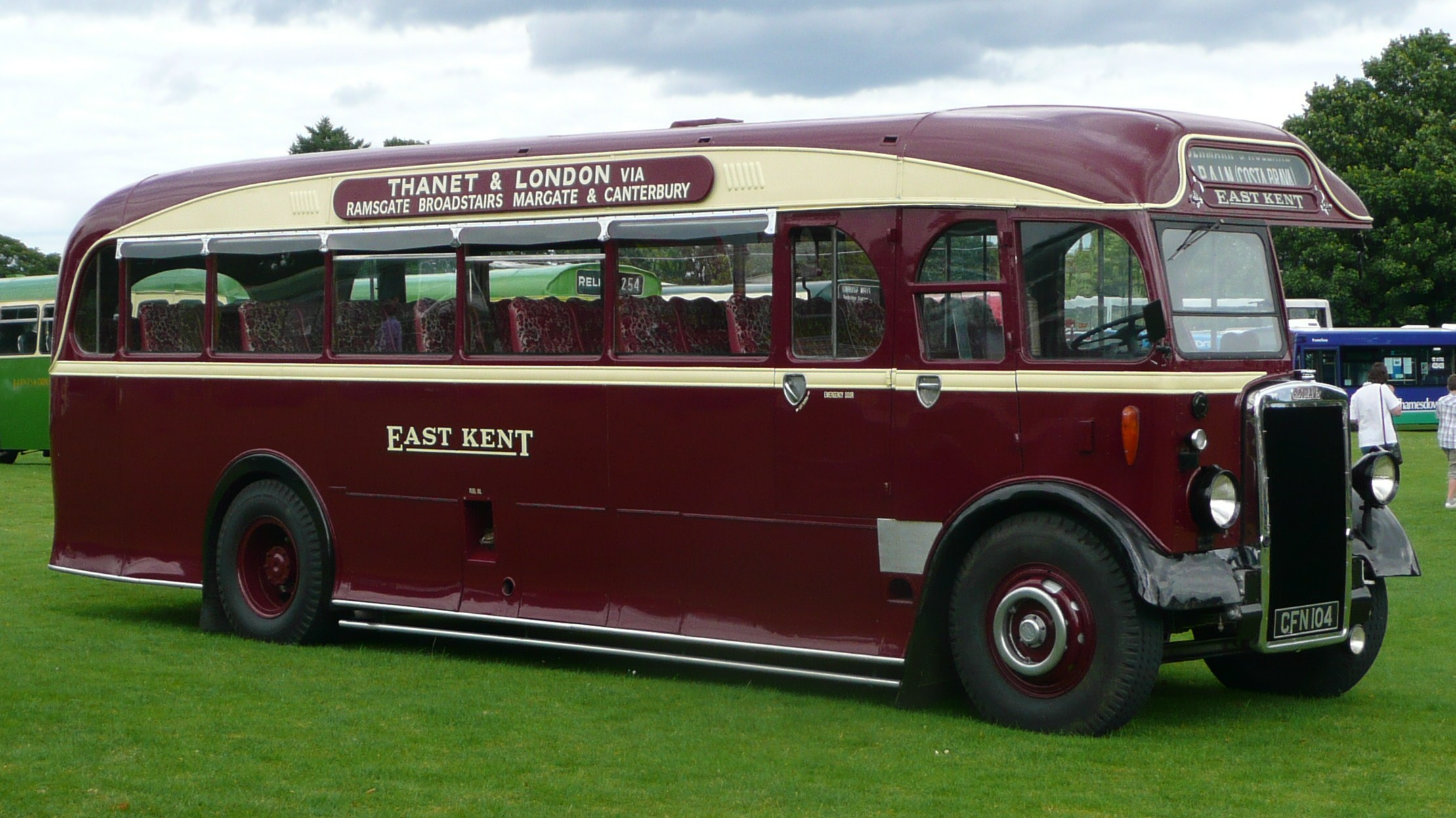
CFN 104, A preserved East Kent Road Car Company Leyland Tiger PS1/Park Royal.

The East Kent Road Car Company Ltd is a bus company formed in 1916 and based in Canterbury, Kent. The company operated bus and coach services in Kent. In 1993 it was one of the first companies to be acquired by the Stagecoach Group, which eventually rebranded the operation as Stagecoach in East Kent, and made it part of the Stagecoach South East bus division.

East Kent serves the area after which it was named and at one time also served part of East Sussex, operations in Rye and Hastings passing to Maidstone & District Motor Services in return for that company's Ashford interests. Since acquisition by the Stagecoach Group, the company has made some radical alterations to its traditional route network, linking some services into long distance circulars.

== History ==
=== Formation ===
East Kent Road Car Company Limited was officially formed on 11 August 1916. It was an amalgamation of Deal & District Motor Services, Wacher & Co (Herne Bay), Margate Canterbury & District, Ramsgate Motor Coaches, and Folkestone & District. The new company began trading on 1 September 1916. From 1928, the Southern Railway became a significant (49%) shareholder in the company. From 1929, an arrangement was made with the General Post Office where letter boxes would be installed on some vehicles. Moving into the 1930s saw the take overs of the tramways of Dover and Thanet, with the trams being quickly replaced with motor buses.

During the Second World War, East Kent vehicles were regular targets for enemy aircraft and their long-range guns, from across the Channel on the French coast, after the fall of France. To try to combat this, the cream-coloured roofs of the buses were repainted grey to help make them less visible. The company experienced many vehicle losses during this time, especially at Dover where the garage suffered a direct hit in 1942, killing several staff. Lots of the vehicles had been lent out or contracted away, some stationed in the Midlands; and this, coupled with those written off by enemy action, led to severe shortages. This was alleviated, somewhat, with the delivery of 10 Guy Arabs with utility Park Royal bodywork.

=== Post-war ===
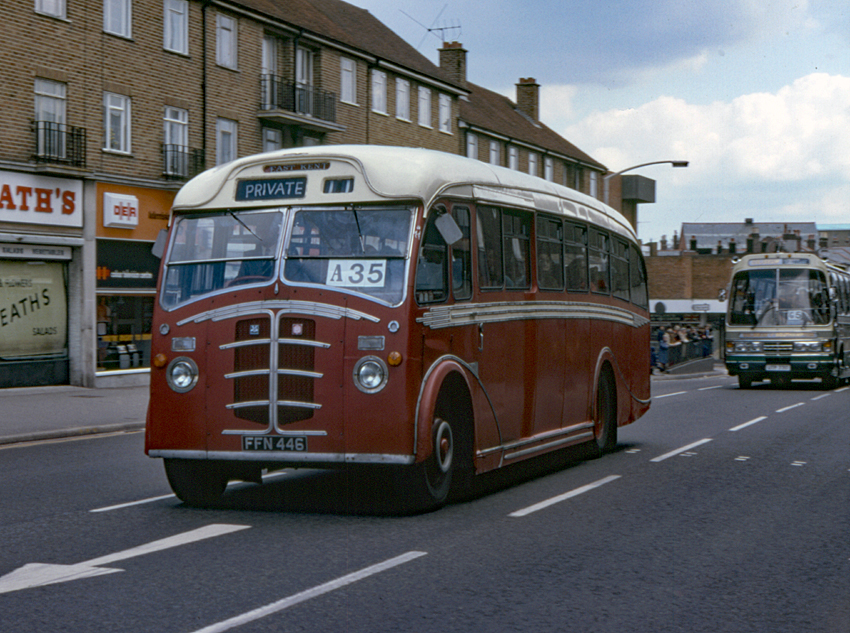
Leyland Titan rebodied by Beadle

After the war, orders were placed for Leyland Tiger PS1 coaches and Dennis Lancet single decker service buses. These arrived between 1946 and 1949. In 1946, East Kent ordered Leyland Titan PD1As with Leyland bodywork. These were delivered in 1947 and 1948. East Kent was one of many operators to use rebodied buses as a way to extend their service life. Prewar Leyland Titans went to ECW for this treatment whilst Leyland Titan TD5s were rebuilt as coaches by Beadle at Dartford. The company began to standardise on Guy Arabs for double decker buses and AEC Reliances for single deckers and coaches, although Dennises and Leylands were also acquired. In the mid-1950s, two of the company's bus stations were rebuilt, Folkestone and Canterbury - both surviving today in refurbished form.

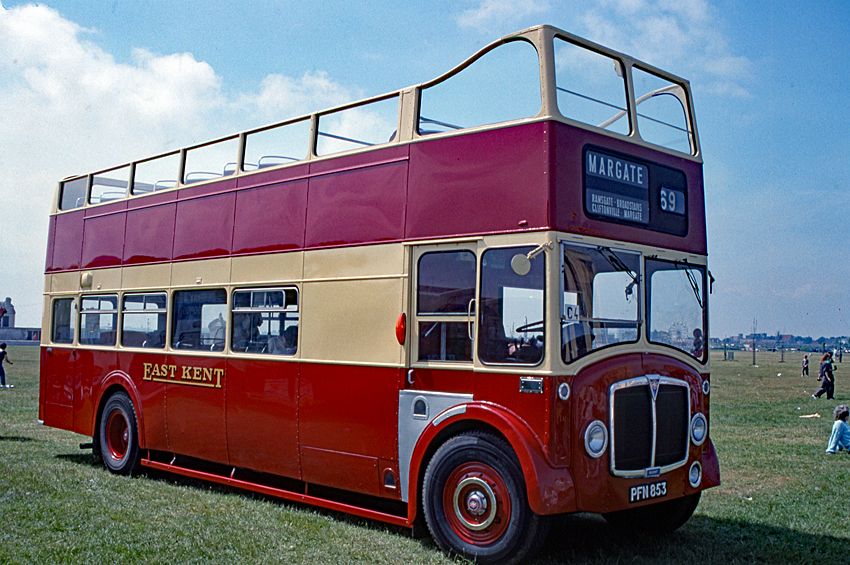
East Kent AEC Regent V on Southsea Common

In the late 1950s, East Kent launched its first open-top bus service with conversion of some of the wartime Guys. Painted in the reverse cream and red livery, they operated out of Thanet Garage. Later, Herne Bay, Dover and Folkestone also operated open-top vehicles. Around this time, the first AEC Regent Vs arrived. These were delivered to Thanet and were bodied by Park Royal to a full front, front entrance design and arrived in 1959. Later, AEC Regents reverted to the half cab layout, but all were bodied by Park Royal and many would survive into the late 1970s and early 1980s. AEC also became the main supplier of single-deck buses and coaches, too, with batches of BET style bodied AEC Reliances entering the fleet as well as Park Royal, Plaxton and Duple bodied coaches.

=== National Bus Company ===
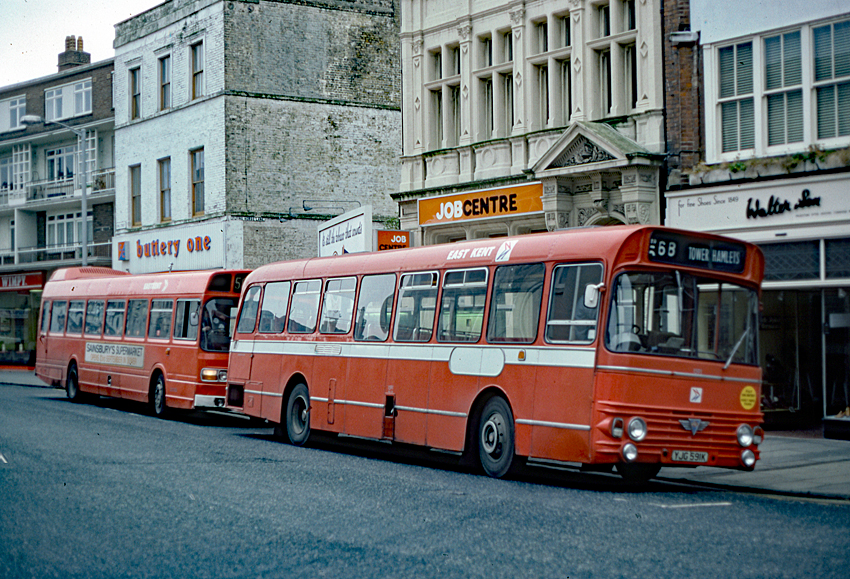
East Kent Leyland National and AEC Swift in Dover, 1980

East Kent was taken over by the National Bus Company on 1 January 1969, during this time the company's first rear engined double deckers arrived. These were Daimler Fleetlines with Park Royal bodywork for Thanet garage. These were also the company's first OMO (one man operated) double deckers. Later on some AEC Regents were also converted to OMO to reduce the cost of having 2 crew on each bus but these tended to be used only at peak hours. In 1971 the last buses were delivered in the traditional maroon and cream livery, these were AEC Swifts with Alexander bodywork. Leyland Nationals started to enter the fleet in the 1970s bringing with them the National Bus Company standard livery of Poppy Red and white. In the mid-1970s the Bristol VRT entered the fleet, the first batch having 14'6" ECW bodywork. Later batches had rare Willowbrook bodies before the final batch reverted to the standard 13'8" ECW body, by that time the NBC's standard vehicle. These cleared the last of the AEC Regents from normal passenger service in the early 1980s although some had a swan song on the park and ride for the Open Golf and Sandwich, whilst others were used on contracts and for driver training.

=== Deregulation ===
On Sunday 26 October 1986, all the bus companies were deregulated. East Kent management entered into negotiations with the NBC sales team in October 1986 and following some hot competition from a French bidder, the company was sold to the management team in March 1987. The NBC 'double arrow' was quickly removed from the vehicles to be replaced by a red EK in a white box. A new livery was introduced of cherry red and cream but it would take several years to completely remove all the NBC livery. Minibuses had entered the fleet in a big way, cutting a dash in bold yellow 'Minilink' livery. These vehicles were used to boost ailing passenger numbers by serving estates not accessible to larger vehicles and offering a better frequency of service. Also to help cover a new route network introduced, Leyland Atlanteans from Northern General arrived. These were later replaced by more Atlanteans from Greater Manchester Transport. The company's first new double deckers for nearly seven years arrived in the form of MCW Metrobuses. Meanwhile, new MCW Hi-Liner coaches were purchased for the coaching fleet. More Metrobuses arrived the following year, some fitted with coach seating. Later, when MCW ceased production, the Company turned, once again, to Leyland for new buses, these being Olympians with Northern Counties bodywork.

1991 saw East Kent celebrate 75 years of service and MCW Metrobus 7755 (E755UKR) was repainted in the traditional livery. In the summer of 1993, the management sold out to a bid from the Perth-based transport group, Stagecoach Group. The coaching side of the business was soon sold off by Stagecoach, as were two garages and part of Westwood (Thanet) Garage, for redevelopment. The then standard Stagecoach livery began to creep into East Kent. Eventually, the maroon and cream was replaced by the original Stagecoach corporate colours of white with orange, red and blue stripes. Stagecoach invested heavily in new vehicles and upgrading routes. East Kent also gained the contract for operating the Canterbury Park and Ride around this time, a service they still operated until late 2008 when they lost it to Kent Top Travel who operated it until the summer of 2013 when it was regained by East Kent.

During 2002, Canterbury Bus Station was given a makeover, and in 2004 Folkestone Bus Station was also refurbished. Low-floor buses on branded routes have become a big part of Stagecoach's business plans. It has also introduced a new livery and the company now trades as 'Stagecoach in East Kent', although the legal lettering remains unchanged. Today, branded routes such as The Loop, The Diamond, The Triangle, The Link, The Stars and The Heart operate in every major town in the area with low-floor, easy-access buses.

== See also ==
- List of bus operators of the United Kingdom
