= Pemberton, Greater Manchester =

Area of Wigan, Greater Manchester, England

Coordinates: 53.5360°N 2.6738°W

Pemberton
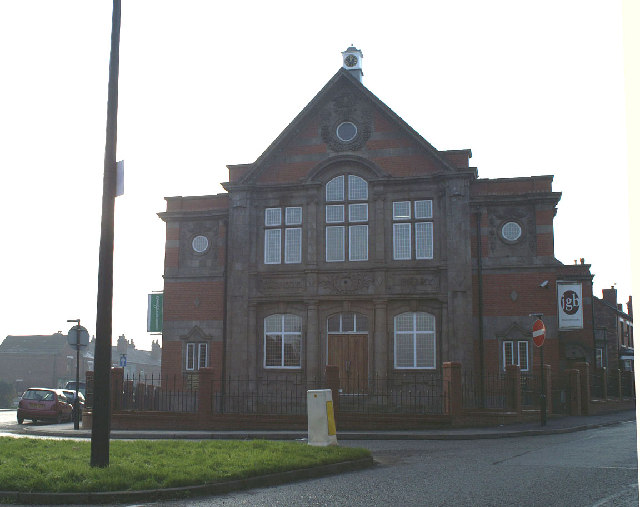
- Pemberton Carnegie Library

- Location within Greater Manchester
- Population: 13,982 (2011 Census)
- OS grid reference: SD555045
- Metropolitan borough: Wigan
- Metropolitan county: Greater Manchester
- Region: North West
- Country: England
- Sovereign state: United Kingdom
- Post town: WIGAN
- Postcode district: WN5
- Dialling code: 01942
- Police: Greater Manchester
- Fire: Greater Manchester
- Ambulance: North West
- UK Parliament: Wigan

Pemberton is an area of Wigan, in Greater Manchester, England. It lies on the southwestern bank of the River Douglas, and east of the M6 motorway. The area is contiguous with Orrell and as a ward has a population of 13,638, increasing to 13,982 at the 2011 Census.

Historically a part of Lancashire, Pemberton was formerly a township and parish in the hundred of West Derby. Following the Industrial Revolution, Pemberton became a densely populated industrial district comprising a variety of coal mines, stone-quarries, brick manufactories, and cotton mills. Coal mining was the principal industry of what was described in 1911 as an "unpicturesque, bare and open" area. The former Pemberton Urban District, along with Wigan Municipal Borough merged to form the County Borough of Wigan in 1904.

== History ==
The name Pemberton derives from Penn-bere-tūn, which is believed to be a combination of the Celtic penn meaning hill, the Old English bere meaning barley plus the Old English suffix of -ton meaning a farm or settlement.

Unmentioned in the Domesday Book of 1086, Pemberton does not appear in records until 1212, when it was documented to have been a thegnage estate, or manor, comprising "two plough-lands", with an annual rate of 20 shillings payable by the tenant, Alan de Windle, to King John.

There were several collieries in the area, and sandstone was also quarried. At Newtown were cotton mills and iron works. The area is served by Pemberton railway station.

== Governance ==
Pemberton was formerly a township in Wigan ecclesiastical parish, in the hundred of West Derby, and was recognised as a civil parish in 1866. From 1894 to 1904, the Pemberton parish constituted the Pemberton Urban District. In 1904 the urban district was abolished with its territory transferred to the borough and local government County Borough of Wigan. The 1911 Encyclopedia Britannica describes Pemberton as being part of Wigan (which then formed 5082 acres). In 1911 the parish had a population of 23,642. On 1 April 1920, the Pemberton parish was abolished and its former area was used to enlarge the Wigan parish, making the area of the parish and county borough identical. Pemberton today is considered part of Wigan for purposes of the Office for National Statistics, and in most reputable contemporary publications. This is also the approach taken also in several other modern online sources, which omit Pemberton as a standalone settlement.

=== Electoral Ward ===
The electoral ward of Pemberton is represented by three elected councillors. The ward covers the following neighbourhoods:

- Kitt Green
- Lamberhead Green (Orrell)
- Marsh Green

== Geography ==
Described in 1911 as "unpicturesque, bare and open", Pemberton is predominantly made up of privately owned homes and local authority maintained housing, including Newtown, Worsley Mesnes, Norley Hall, Worsley Hall and Marsh Green. Pemberton and its adjoining district of Orrell form one continuous residential area.

The soil is clay and loam, over coal measures and stone.

== See also ==
- Hawkley Hall
- St John the Divine's Church, Pemberton
