= SRT =

SRT or srt may refer to:

== Transportation ==
=== Automotive ===
- Class SRT, type of London Transport bus
- Sam Rayburn Tollway, Dallas–Fort Worth area, United States
- Street and Racing Technology, American high-performance automobile group
- Suter Racing Technology, Swiss Moto2 constructor
- Selleslagh Racing Team, Belgium
- Swiss Racing Team, auto racing team
- Sepang Racing Team, motorcycle racing team
- Spark Racing Technology, French motorsport manufacturer

=== Rail ===
- SRT (train), former service in South Korea
- Scarborough RT, Toronto, Canada
- Shortlands railway station, London, National Rail station code
- State Railway of Thailand

== Physics ==
- Sardinia Radio Telescope
- Special relativity theory

== Computing and electronics ==
- .srt, extension for SubRip subtitle computer files
- SRT Communications (formerly Souris River Telecommunications), Minot, North Dakota, US
- Sweeney–Robertson–Tocher division, computer division algorithm
- Secure Reliable Transport, video streaming protocol
- Smart Response Technology, a caching mechanism by Intel
- Standard Radio & Telefon AB, a Swedish computer manufacturer
- Shortest remaining time, a scheduling algorithm
- SRT, Inc., doing business as Covox, a defunct American technology company
- Minolta SR-T camera series

== Medicine and education ==
- Stereotactic radiation therapy
- Superficial radiation therapy
- SRT-, prefix used for Sirtris Pharmaceuticals products
- Sitting-rising test, clinical test
- Sex reassignment therapy
- Self-regulation theory
- Serial reaction time, measure of learning time
- Silver Ring Thing, sexual abstinence program
- Samuel Robertson Technical Secondary School

== Arts and media ==
- Sound Recording Technology, UK studio
- Srpska Radiotelevizija or Serbian Radio-television, now Radio Televizija Republike Srpske
- Sichuan Radio and Television
- Singapore Repertory Theatre

== Government and combat ==
- Scottish Register of Tartans
- Special Rescue Team, Japan Coast Guard
- Special reaction team, in the United States military

== Other uses ==
- Sauri language of Papua, Indonesia
- Schuylkill River Trail, Philadelphia, US
- Single rope technique in caving
- Sachin Ramesh Tendulkar, former Indian cricketer

== See also ==
- SRT-129, museum ship in Kaliningrad
