= Arriva London =

Bus operator based in Greater London, England

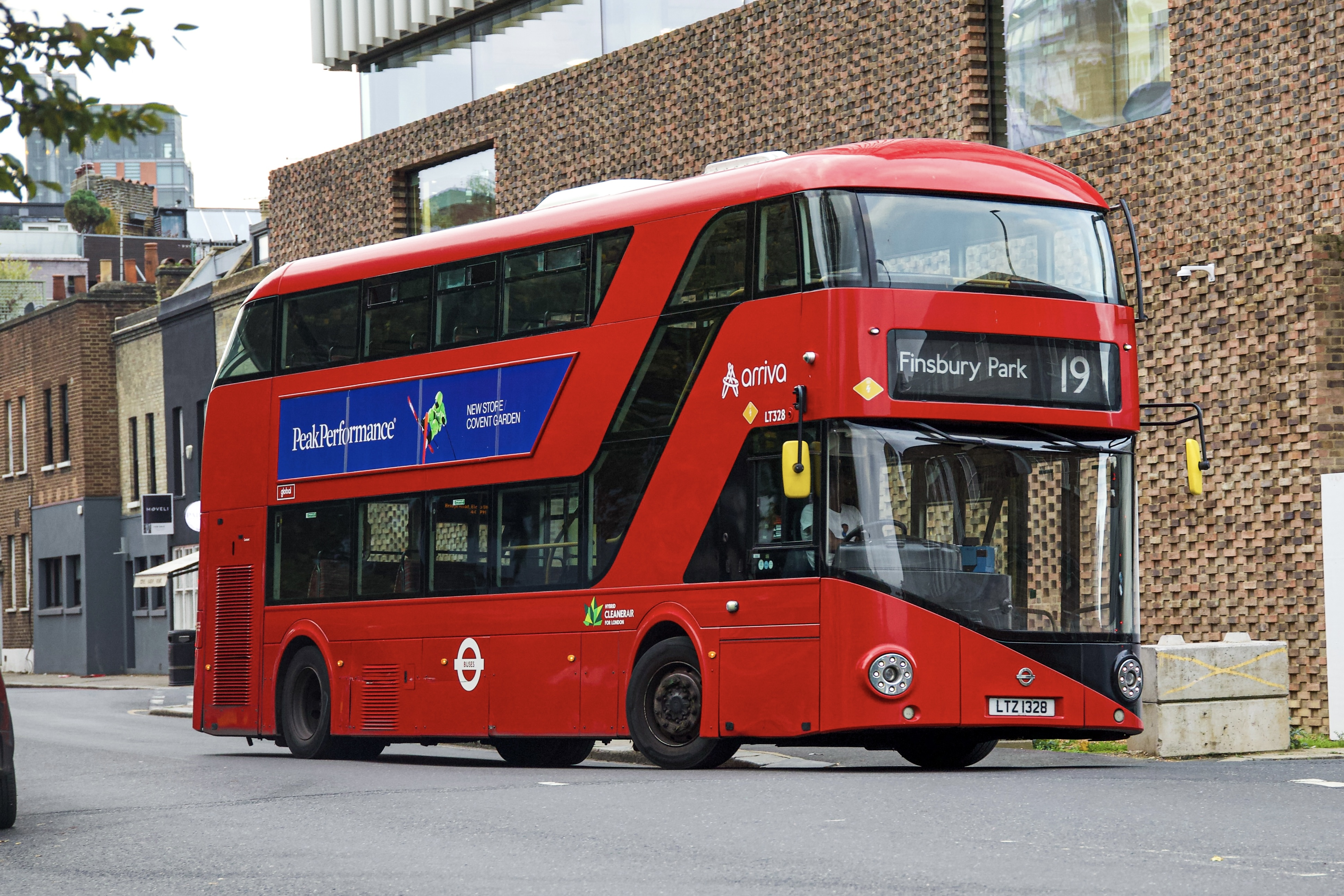
- New Routemaster in Battersea on route 19
- Parent: Arriva UK Bus
- Founded: 1998
- Headquarters: Wood Green
- Service area: Greater London
- Service type: Bus operator
- Routes: 87
- Depots: 14
- Fleet: 1,528 (March 2024)
- Fuel type: Diesel, electric and hybrid
- Website: www.arrivabus.co.uk/arriva-london

Arriva London is a bus operator operating primarily in Greater London and partially in Essex, Hertfordshire, Kent and Surrey. It is a subsidiary of Arriva UK Bus and operates services for London Buses under contract to Transport for London. Operations are split between two registered companies, Arriva London North Limited and Arriva London South Limited.

== History ==
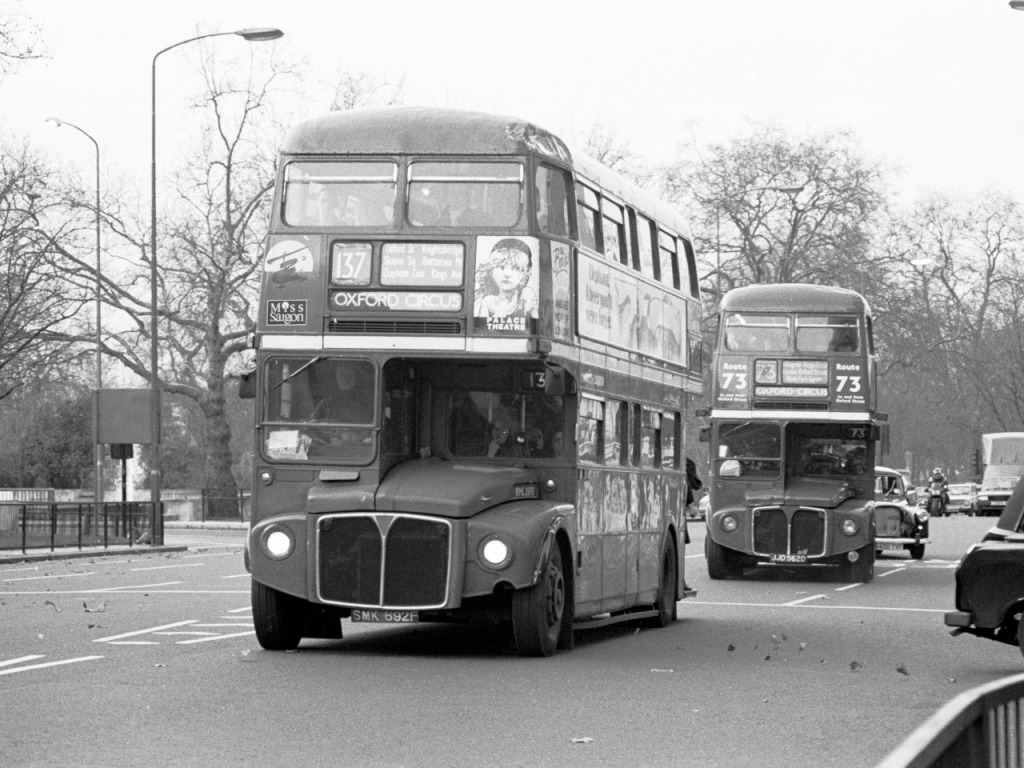
LRT AEC Routemasters operated by South London and Leaside Buses on Park Lane on routes 137 and 73 in December 1991

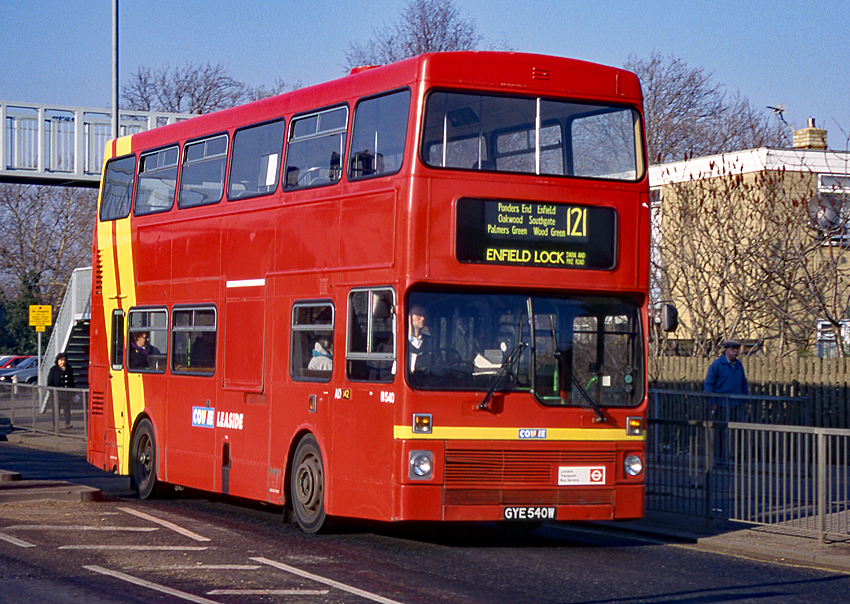
Cowie Leaside MCW Metrobus on route 121 in January 1997

The origins of Arriva London can be traced back to 1980 when the Cowie Group purchased the Grey-Green coach business in London.

In February 1987, Grey-Green commenced operating bus routes in north and east London under contract to London Regional Transport (LRT).

On 1 April 1989, London Buses was divided into 11 separate business units, two of which were Leaside Buses and South London Transport. As part of the privatisation of London bus services, the Cowie Group purchased these business units in September 1994 and January 1995 for £25.5 million (equivalent to £53,805,000 in 2025) and £17 million (equivalent to £35,870,000 in 2025) respectively. As a result of London Transport stipulating in 1995 that buses operating in London must feature a livery painted 80% red, Leaside Buses and South London Transport were both rebranded by design consultants Sigmund Shalit & Associates as Cowie Leaside and Cowie South London in January 1996, with buses receiving a livery of red with yellow striping and blue and white Cowie fleetnames.

On 1 August 1996, the Cowie Group purchased British Bus, which owned the Kentish Bus and London & Country businesses that also operated London-area bus services. In November 1997, the Cowie Group was rebranded as Arriva. The combined group of London operations - Grey Green, Kentish Bus, Leaside Buses, London & Country and South London Transport - initially maintained their liveries with added Arriva logos and fleetnames until a new London red variant of the national livery scheme was eventually introduced.

On 1 January 2016, as part of a decision to consolidate all of Arriva's Transport for London operations with Arriva London, Arriva Herts & Essex, Arriva Kent Thameside and Tellings-Golden Miller's Transport for London operations were each transferred to Arriva London.

== Garages ==
=== Arriva London North Limited ===
Arriva London North Limited operates ten garages.

==== Barking (DX) ====
Barking garage operates routes 150 and 175.

Barking garage was opened in 1992 by Grey-Green to meet the demands of their expanding North East London operations. Dix Coaches was a subsidiary of Grey-Green operating from a base in the Dagenham area, which moved to the new garage on opening, hence the DX code.

==== Clapton (CT) ====
Clapton garage operates routes 10, 38, 73, 253, N38, N73 and N253.

Clapton garage has its origins back as far as 1882, when it was known as Hackney Tram Depot and housed horse trams. In the early 1900s, it was taken over by the London County Council to house electric trams, which lasted at the depot until 1939, when trolleybuses took over. In the early 1940s, some of the surrounding buildings in Bohemia Place were knocked down to provide more space and better access to the garage.

By 1950, the depot had changed its name to Clapton to avoid confusion with the nearby Well Street garage (H) prior to being converted for motorbus operation. Following the conversion, the parking area allowed for 90 buses and in 1959, 67 RTLs were allocated as part of the trolleybus replacement programme. In 1974, shortly after the introduction of London Transport's first female bus drivers, Clapton bus conductor Rose Alexander became LT's first female bus inspector. In August 1987, the garage was closed as part of an LRT cost-cutting scheme, with the remaining work transferred to the newer Ash Grove bus garage.

In 1989, the garage was reopened to take some pressure off of Walthamstow by housing MRLs for route 236. With the closure of Ash Grove in 1991, work started to build up steadily, and then in 1995, route 253 was allocated from the closed Stamford Hill garage. In 1998, Clapton received the first low-floor double deckers in London in the form of Alexander ALX400-bodied DAF DB250LFs purchased by Arriva, and also tried out LPG buses, most notably a DAF with a Plaxton Prestige body.

==== Dartford (DT) ====
Dartford garage operates routes 96, 229, 335, 428 and 492.

As part of a decision to consolidate all of Arriva's Transport for London routes with Arriva London, Dartford garage was transferred from Arriva Kent Thameside on 1 January 2016.

==== Edmonton (EC) ====
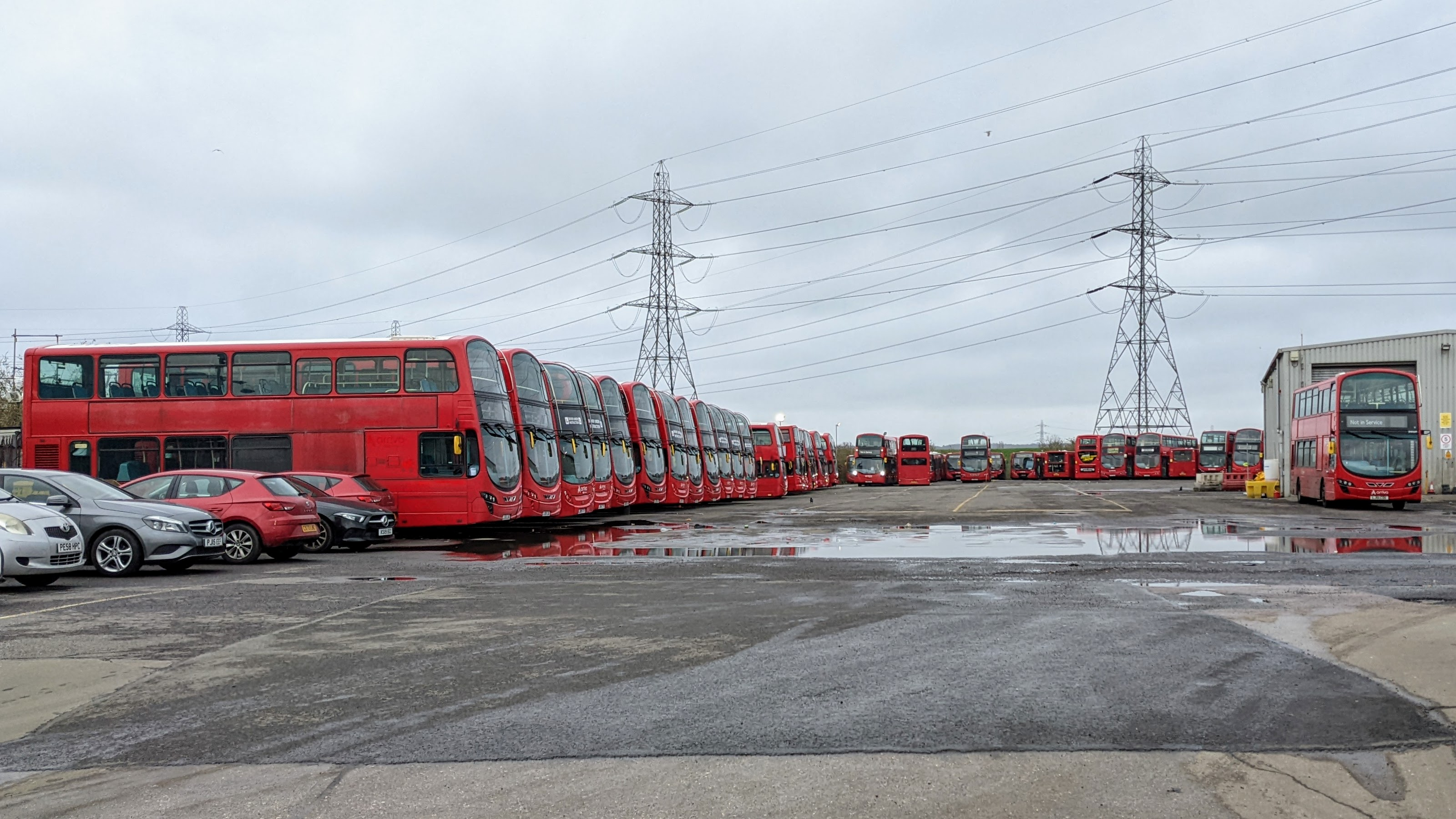
Edmonton bus garage's outside parking area, March 2022

Edmonton garage operates route 158.

Edmonton garage was first opened in 1993 by London Suburban Bus to operate routes 4 and 271, and later 41. The company was taken over in 1995 by MTL London Northern, with routes 4 and 271 transferred to Holloway, and route 41 transferred to Cowie Leaside. As a result, the garage was closed in 1996.

The garage was reopened by County Bus & Coach in 1997, and in 1998, this operation was merged with the Leaside Travel unit. In 2005, the garage was adapted for Mercedes-Benz Citaro articulated buses on route 149. Having closed in September 2012, on 1 March 2014, Edmonton reopened to replace Lee Valley.

==== Enfield (E) ====
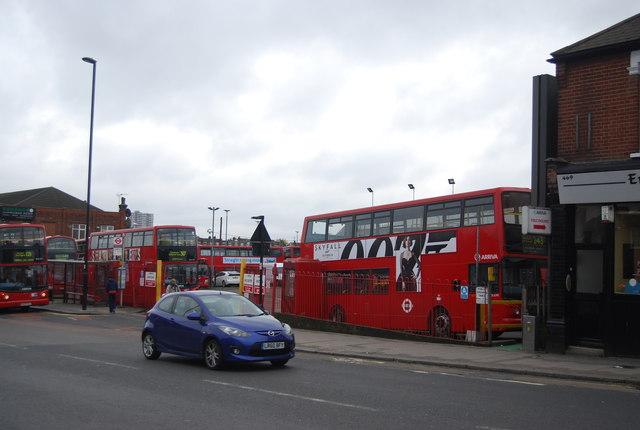
Enfield bus garage from Southbury Road, October 2012

Enfield garage operates routes 121, 191, 192, 217, 279, 307, 377 and N279.

Enfield garage was built in 1927 by the London General Omnibus Company. Further land was soon acquired in the front of the garage for use as a bus stand, which later also got used as a terminus for trolleybuses. The garage was modernised at a cost of over £6 million in the early 1980s, and when it reopened in 1984, it had space for 106 buses. More recently, Enfield garage has become a central part of Arriva London operations with the accident repair centre and undertaking of major refurbishments.

==== Grays (GY) ====
Grays garage operates routes 66, 103, 248, 370 and 375.

As part of a decision to consolidate all of Arriva's Transport for London operations with Arriva London, Grays garage was transferred from Arriva Kent Thameside on 1 January 2016.

==== Palmers Green (AD) ====
Palmers Green garage operates routes 34, 102, 141, 675 and SL1.

Palmers Green garage was opened in July 1912 by the London General Omnibus Company to house their bus fleet operating in competition in North London with Metropolitan Electric Tramways (MET) trams. Following World War II, the allocation at Palmers Green was made up of AEC Regent III RTs, Leyland Titan RTLs and RTWs and SRT class AEC Regent I rebuilds, making Palmers Green the only London Transport garage to be allocated all four standard buses of the London Passenger Transport Board's double deck types, although none could fit in the garage until the roof could be raised by 10 inches, which was completed in 1952 after a process taking 20 weeks. The garage was further modernised in 1974, by which time 60 buses were allocated. AEC Routemasters arrived in 1969 replacing the RTs, but the RTs lasted there until 1978.

One-person operated buses, in the form of AEC Regal VIs, began arriving at Palmers Green and were followed in time by AEC Swifts, Daimler Fleetlines, and MCW Metrobuses. The Routemasters lasted on route 29 until the late 1980s, and in 1994, the allocation was 51, entirely MCW Metrobuses. In latter years, the allocation has increased slightly and other than Metrobuses, Volvo B10Ms and Alexander ALX400 bodied DAF DB250LFs have been allocated.

London's first modern hybrid electric bus, a Wright Pulsar Gemini HEV, was based from Palmers Green, first entered service in March 2007 on route 141.

==== Stamford Hill (SF) ====
Stamford Hill garage operates routes 19, 67, 76, 254 and N19.

Stamford Hill opened in February 1907 as a London County Council tram depot. In February 1939, it was converted into trolleybus depot and in July 1961 for bus use. It was closed in 1995, before reopening in 2006. It closed again in November 2020. The garage was re-opened on 24 February 2024 to operate route 254.

==== Tottenham (AR) ====
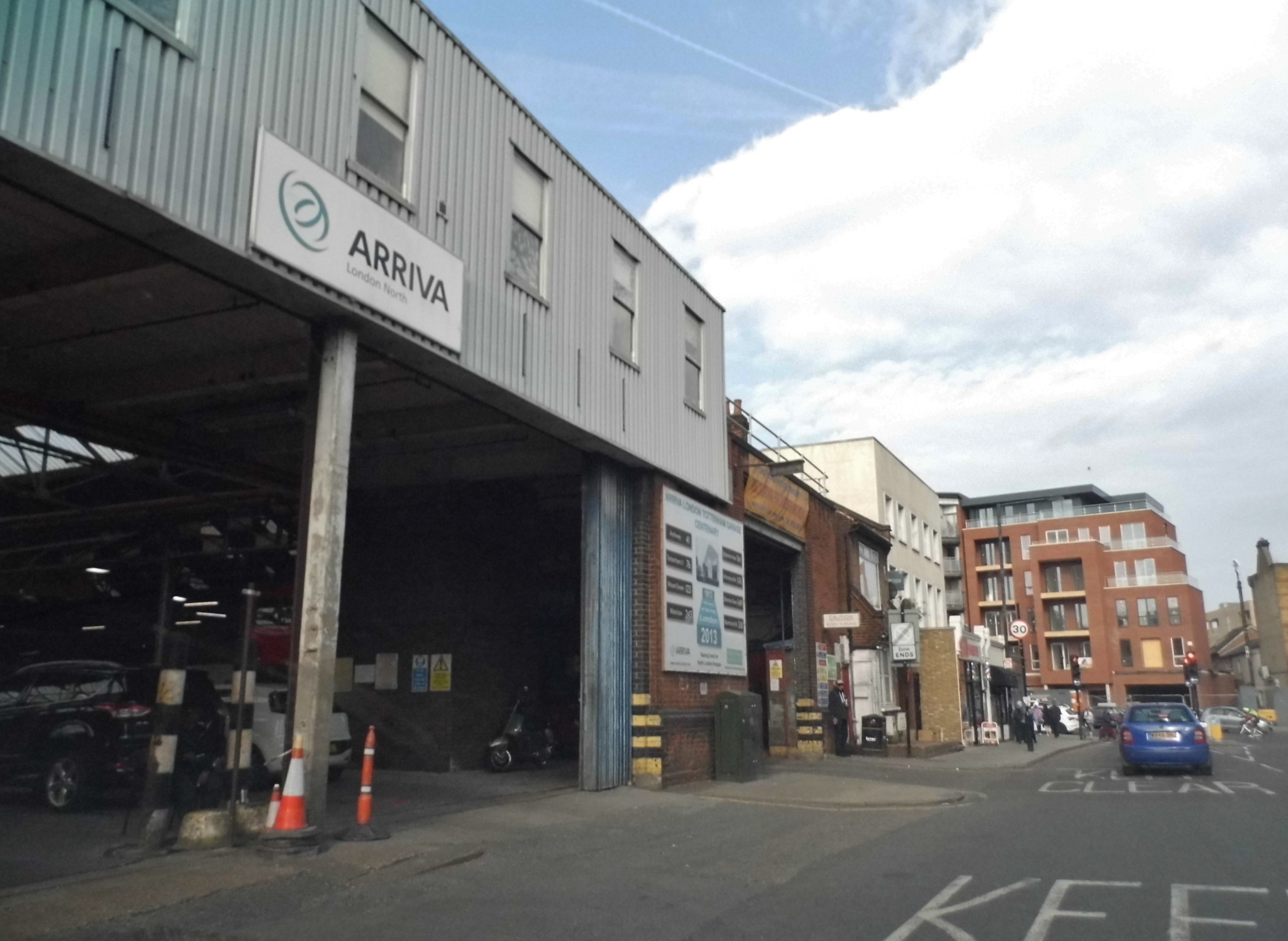
Frontage of Tottenham bus garage from Philip Lane, May 2018

Tottenham garage operates routes 41, 149, 243, 259, 341, N41 and SL2.

Tottenham garage was built in 1913 by the MET to run buses to support their tram network. The buses were requisitioned during World War I, and then between 1917 and 1919 the garage was loaned to AEC. Before World War II in 1939 the allocation consisted of ST, STL and LTs, but during the war it was the first garage to receive utility Guy Arabs, and later in 1949 London's first 8 ft wide buses. When route 236 moved with its RFs to Dalston in 1971 it signalled an absence of single deckers at the garage that would last until 2001 when route W4 was won.

MCW Metrobuses and AEC Routemasters were the staple diet of the garage for many years until the new Alexander ALX400 bodied DAF DB250LFs arrived. The final Routemasters left Tottenham in September 2004 when route 73 was converted to Mercedes-Benz Citaro articulated bus operation and moved to Lee Valley.

==== Wood Green (WN) ====
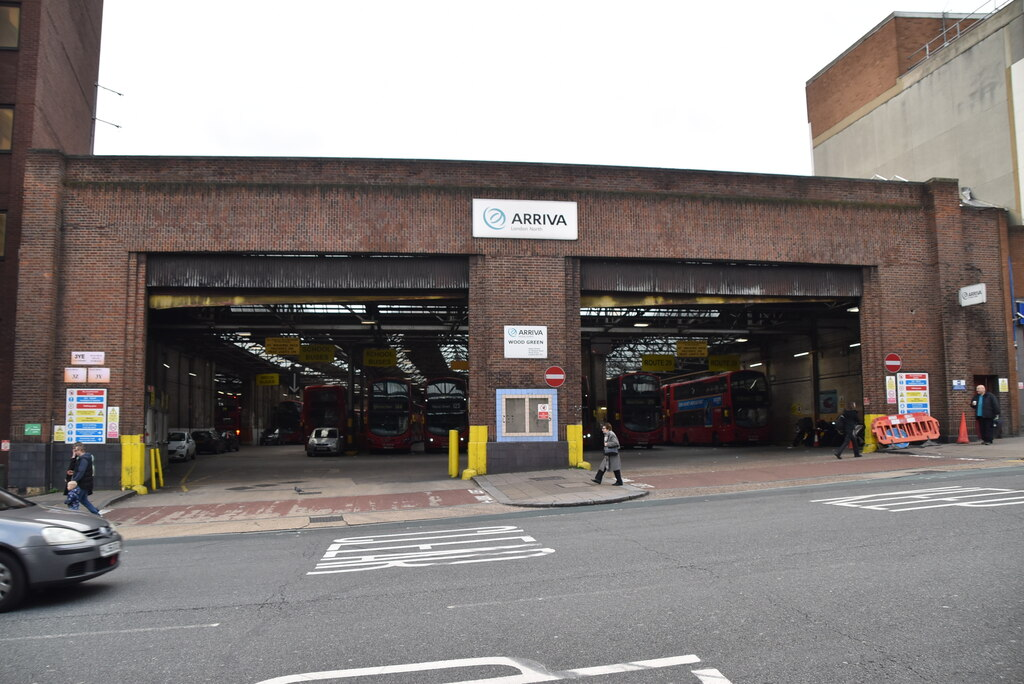
Wood Green garage from High Road, January 2020

Wood Green garage operates routes 29, 221, 329, 616, W3, W4, W6 and N29.

Transformed in the early 1900s from a horse tram depot to a modern tram depot with a capacity of 67. It was completely remodelled in the late 1930s to allow for trolleybus operations and a capacity of 108. The garage was further adapted again in 1960 for buses. AEC Routemasters arrived to replace trolleybuses in April 1961, and with the closure of West Green in 1962 more work arrived.

=== Arriva London South Limited ===
Arriva London South Limited operates four garages.

==== Brixton (BN) ====
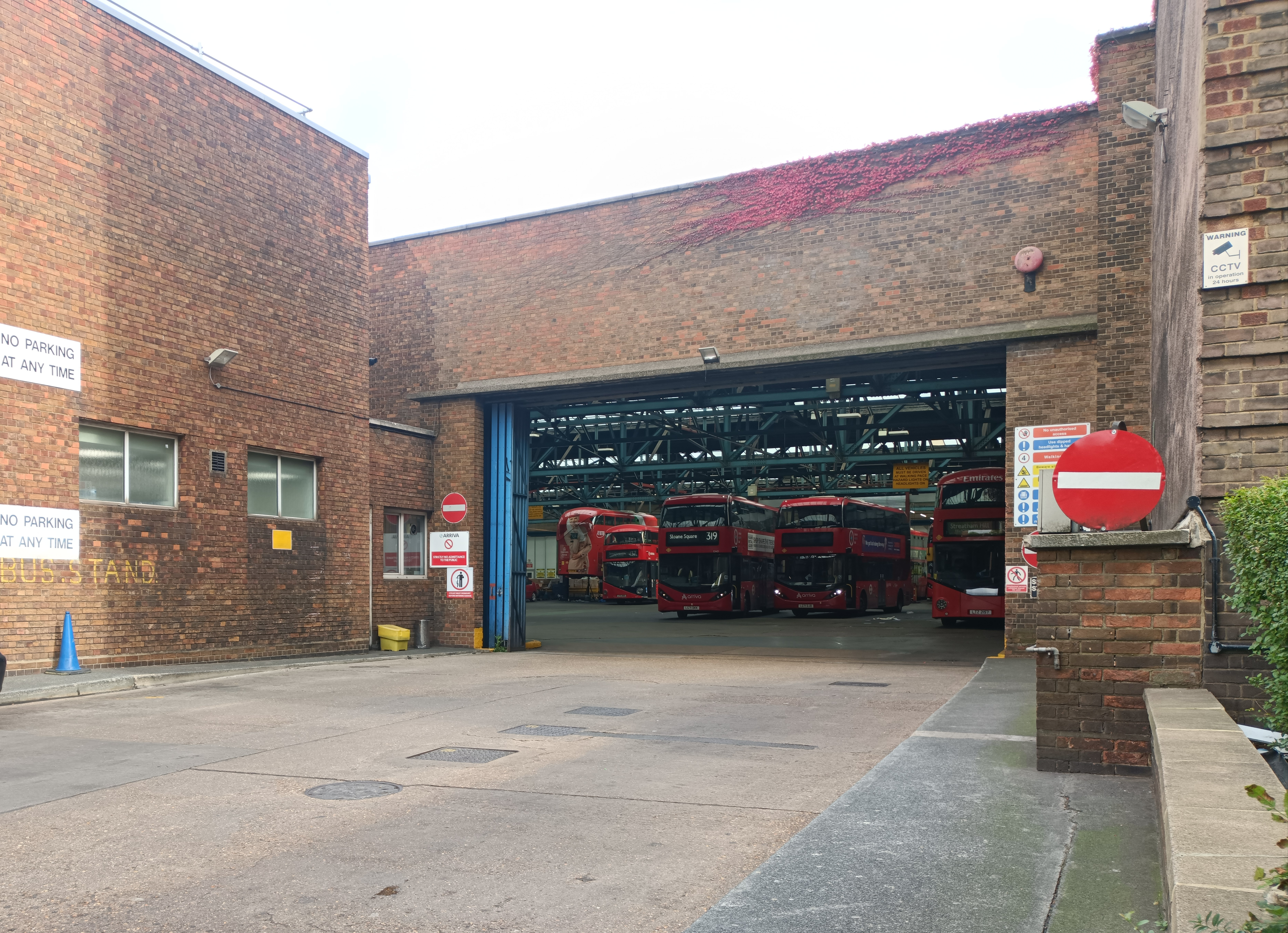
Brixton bus garage on Brixton Hill, October 2025

Brixton garage operates routes 50, 59, 137, 319, 417 and N137.

Originally built as a depot for cable trams which ran up Brixton Hill in 1892, it was re-built between 1904 and 1906 for use by electric trams. In 1939, the garage was extended onto a site formerly owned by the water board and containing a large water main, and then in 1949, reconstruction started to bury the main and convert the depot into one large building instead of two smaller ones. The last trams ran from the depot in 1951, by which time AEC Regent III RTs had started to arrive, with the last RT remaining until 1976.

In 1971, Brixton became one of the first to receive Daimler Fleetlines, followed by MCW Metrobuses in 1984. The garage also received the first production Wright Cadet bodied DAF single deckers in 2001. Brixton was also the last depot to operate AEC Routemasters in regular service in London on route 159, with the last Routemasters being withdrawn at Brixton on 9 December 2005. The garage exclusively operates double-decker buses, with all single-decker buses having been transferred to other garages.

Brixton became the first Arriva London bus garage to begin moving towards electrification of its fleet during 2021, being connected to the National Grid ahead of the delivery of 22 BYD Alexander Dennis Enviro400EV battery electric buses for use on route 319.

==== Croydon (TC) ====
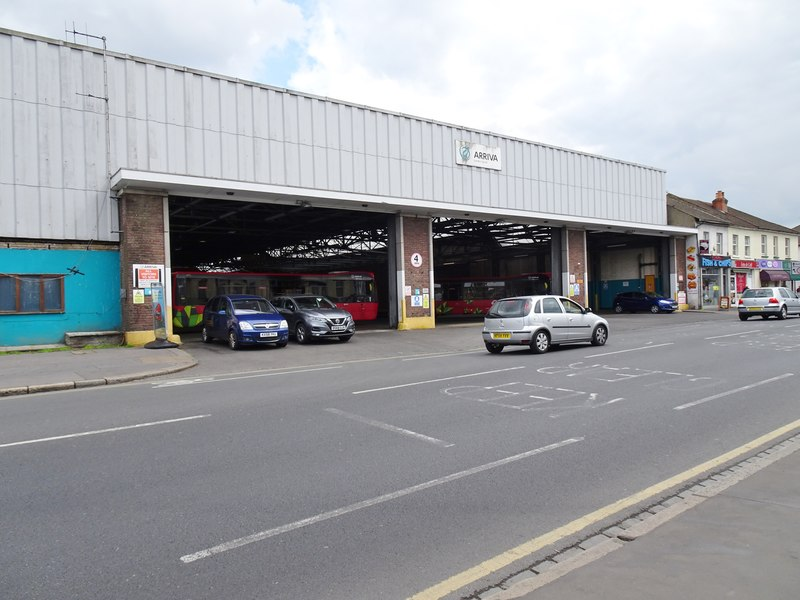
Croydon bus garage from Brighton Road, May 2019

Croydon garage operates routes 60, 166, 194, 312, 405, 412, 466, 685 and SL5.

Built by the London General Omnibus Company in 1915, the garage was handed over to Thomas Tilling on opening as part of an agreement between the two operators. The garage had to have roof reconstruction in the early 1930s to allow roofed double deckers to use the garage and was totally destroyed in 1941 after an air raid which also killed four staff and destroyed 56 buses. The reconstruction was finally completed in the mid-1950s. AEC Regent III RTs mainly monopolised the garage until the arrival of AEC Routemasters in 1964.

In 1969, experimental XAs and later FRM1 were tested on route 233. When the XAs departed in 1973 they were replaced by Daimler Fleetlines which lasted until January 1993. LSs started to arrive in the late 1970s and MCW Metrobus in 1985 until they were replaced by Leyland Titans. When Elmers End closed a reshuffle took place with the Routemasters departing and the garage became fully one man operated, and later in 1994, the garage became fully double deck with the departure of the last Leyland Nationals.

==== Norwood (N) ====
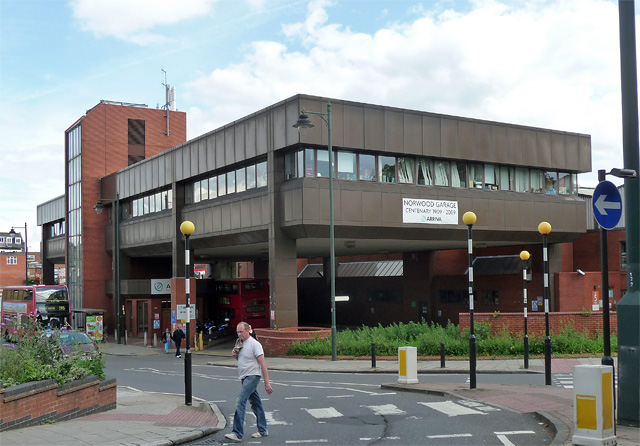
Norwood bus garage from Knight's Hill, July 2012

Norwood garage operates routes 2, 196, 198, 202, 249, 432, 468, 627, N2 and SL6.

Norwood garage was opened in 1909 by the London General Omnibus Company. The garage has had a steady allocation over the years and in 1951 took over some of the vehicles for the Festival of Britain services from the nearby Norwood Tram Depot. In 1981 the garage underwent complete reconstruction, with the buses and staff being transferred temporarily to the reopened Clapham Garage until 1984.

The garage previously supplied some buses and drivers for route 19 following the conversion from Routemaster operation in 2005, but this ceased with the closure of Battersea, with the whole of the route transferring to Brixton.

A £17 million project to install electric bus chargers at Norwood garage was completed in July 2025, facilitating the arrival of 30 Alexander Dennis Enviro400EV battery electric buses for use on Superloop route SL6.

==== Thornton Heath (TH) ====
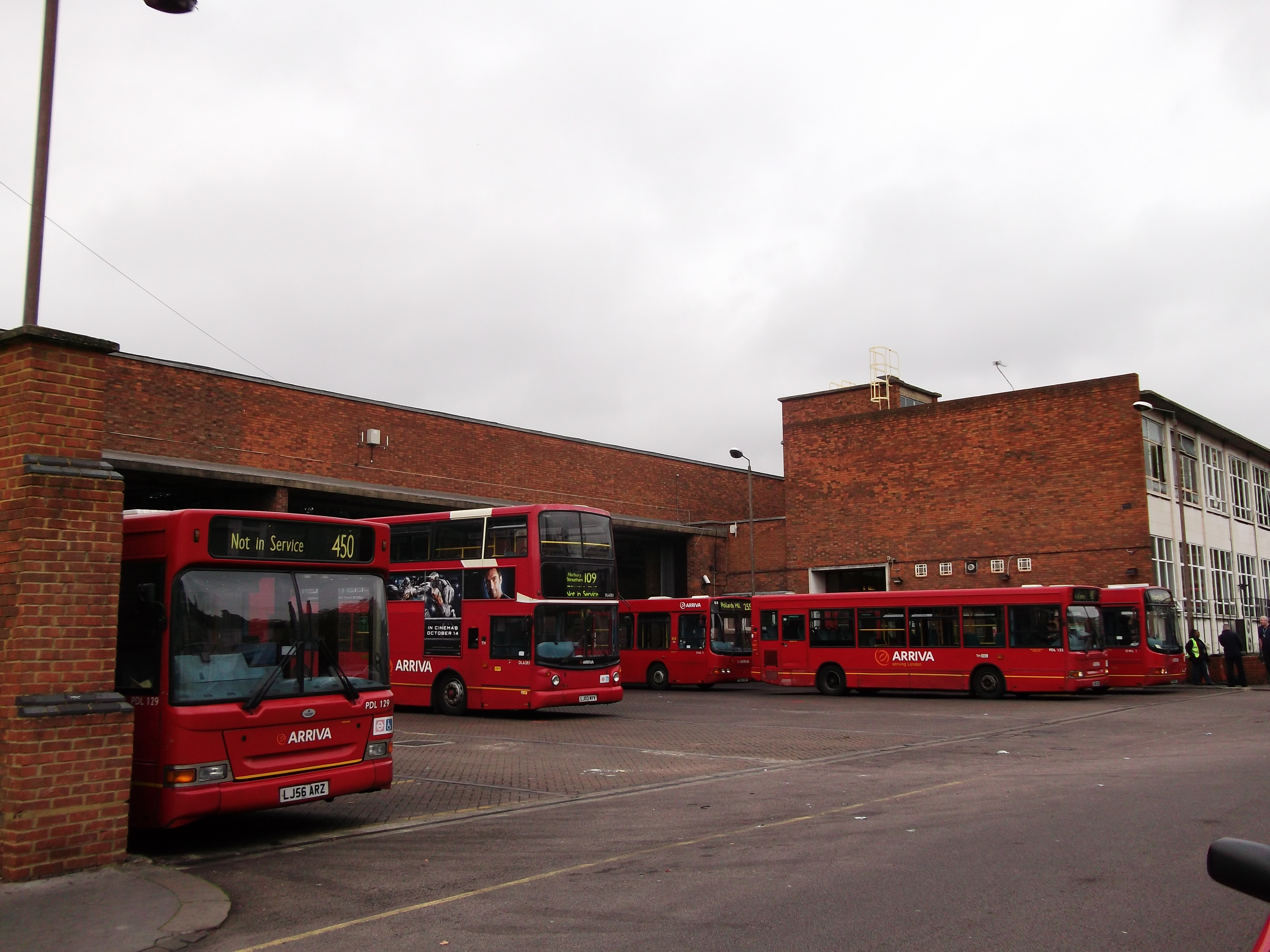
Thornton Heath bus garage from Whitehall Road, October 2011

Thornton Heath garage operates routes 64, 198, 250, 255, 289, 410, 612, 663, 689 and N250.

Originally opened as the garage for the first horse tramway in Croydon in 1879 it was later rebuilt as an electric tram depot in 1901. Initially, it could house 26 trams but was extended the following year to take 43 cars. Thornton Heath was earmarked for closure as a tram depot for reconstruction at the tram replacement program of 1950–52 but actually shut before the last tram finished with the work and staff moving to Purley.

Buses were starting to operate from the new garage before reconstruction was complete in 1951 with 54 AEC Regent III RTs, just half of its capacity. AEC Routemasters arrived in the early 1960s bringing it up to 84 buses. The RTs lasted until 1976, outlasting the RMs which were replaced by Daimler Fleetlines in 1971, although they did return between 1976–1978 and 1982–1987 when the garage became entirely one man operated.

By 1994 the garage was worked almost entirely by Leyland Olympians and MCW Metrobuses with a few Dennis Dart and MCW Metroriders. There was also a period where the then South London Transport regularly transferred vehicles about, and whilst Thornton Heath retained its Olympians throughout, they were joined not only by Metrobuses but also Leyland Titans. Thornton Heath also briefly flirted with SR-class StarRiders, as well as sharing vehicle evaluation duties with Bromley for the DA/SA classes of vehicle, operating SA1 From October 1989 to February 1990 before swapping it for DA1, which stayed here for a further 6 months before being moved to Westlink.

Thornton Heath became Arriva London's third garage to begin moving to electrification of its fleet in November 2024, following the installation of an electrical substation to facilitate the charging of up to 109 battery electric buses. Initially, the garage will house a fleet of 22 electric buses, expanding to full capacity by spring 2025 upon the completion of the electrification project, which will eventually see the removal of diesel refuelling tanks from the garage.

== Former garages ==
=== Ash Grove (AE) ===
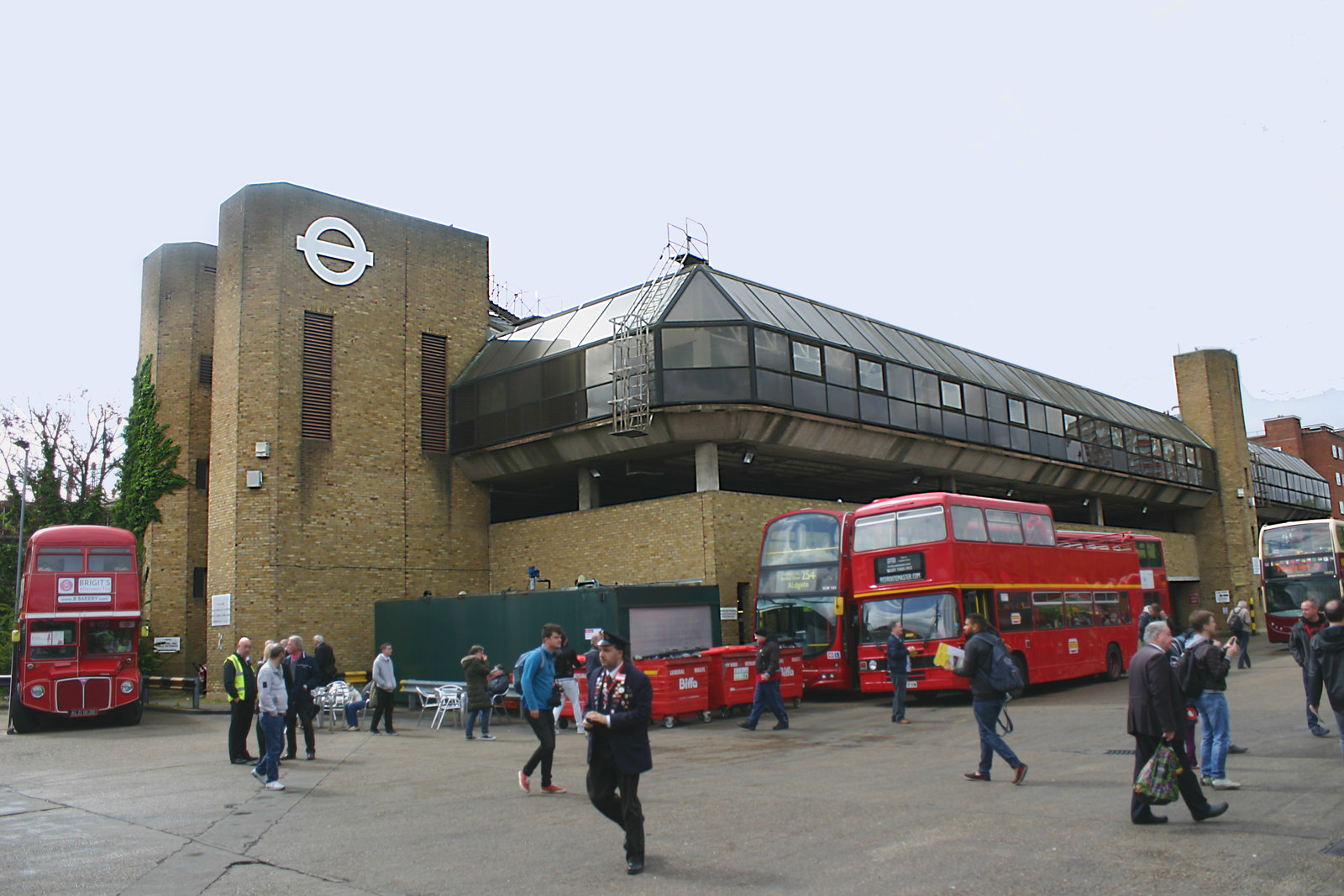
Ash Grove bus garage during an open day in April 2017

Ash Grove garage operated route 254. This garage was shared with Stagecoach London.

==== History ====
One of three new garages opened in 1981 by London Buses at a cost of £3.5 million, Ash Grove garage had space for 140 buses undercover and a further 30 in the yard. The roof was unusual in being carried by 10 35-ton triangular trusses, said to be the largest in the UK, supported on reinforced concrete columns.

On opening the garage took over Hackney's operation of Red Arrow routes 502 and 513 using brand new Leyland Nationals which had been stored at the garage, and also the entire Hackney and Dalston allocations. Ash Grove found itself in the London Forest operation, and also had a reputation for staff militancy and closed in 1991. The garage was reopened in 1994 by Kentish Bus to operate their Leyton area route gains, although they referred to it as Cambridge Heath. It was also used over the years to house stored vehicles for the London Transport Museum, and again in 2000 to store additional AEC Routemasters that had been acquired to supplement shortages in London.

In 2000, it was reopened by the London Buses subsidiary East Thames Buses which took over the former Harris Bus routes after that company ran into financial difficulties. Hackney Community Transport also moved into the garage yard in recent times to house its routes won in the London area although East Thames Buses later moved to new premises in Mandela Way, Southwark and were replaced at the garage by Arriva's new Mercedes-Benz Citaro articulated buses for route 38 following the conversion from Routemasters in November 2005.

=== Battersea (BA) ===
==== History ====
The original Battersea garage was opened in 1906 by the London Roadcar Company on the north side of Hester Road, but by 1914 more space was needed and an annexe was built on the south side. Two modernisation schemes were undertaken, first in the 1960s to allow for AEC Routemasters to be allocated and again in 1971 when a new canteen and recreation room was built.

The garage closed in 1985 with its allocation being split between Victoria and Wandsworth garages. Battersea was however given a reprieve some time later when it was used to house the London Buses coaches and sightseeing operations until 1988 when the entire operation moved to Wandsworth garage. In 1993, a yard adjacent to the old garage was opened as a base for Kentish Bus route 19 operation after it had moved out of its Covent Garden Market base.

Most of the area formally occupied on both the North and South sides of Hester Road has now been built into a luxury flats complex. The only section remaining is the small shed which was originally an outstation from Brixton garage housing the route 19 Routemasters. When the Routemasters left in July 2005 the garage received an allocation of Alexander ALX400 bodied Volvo B7TLs for route 19, although some of these need to be parked at (and use drivers from) Norwood garage because there was not enough space for these larger buses.

In November 2009, Battersea garage was closed and the site redeveloped.

=== Beddington Farm (CN) ===
==== History ====
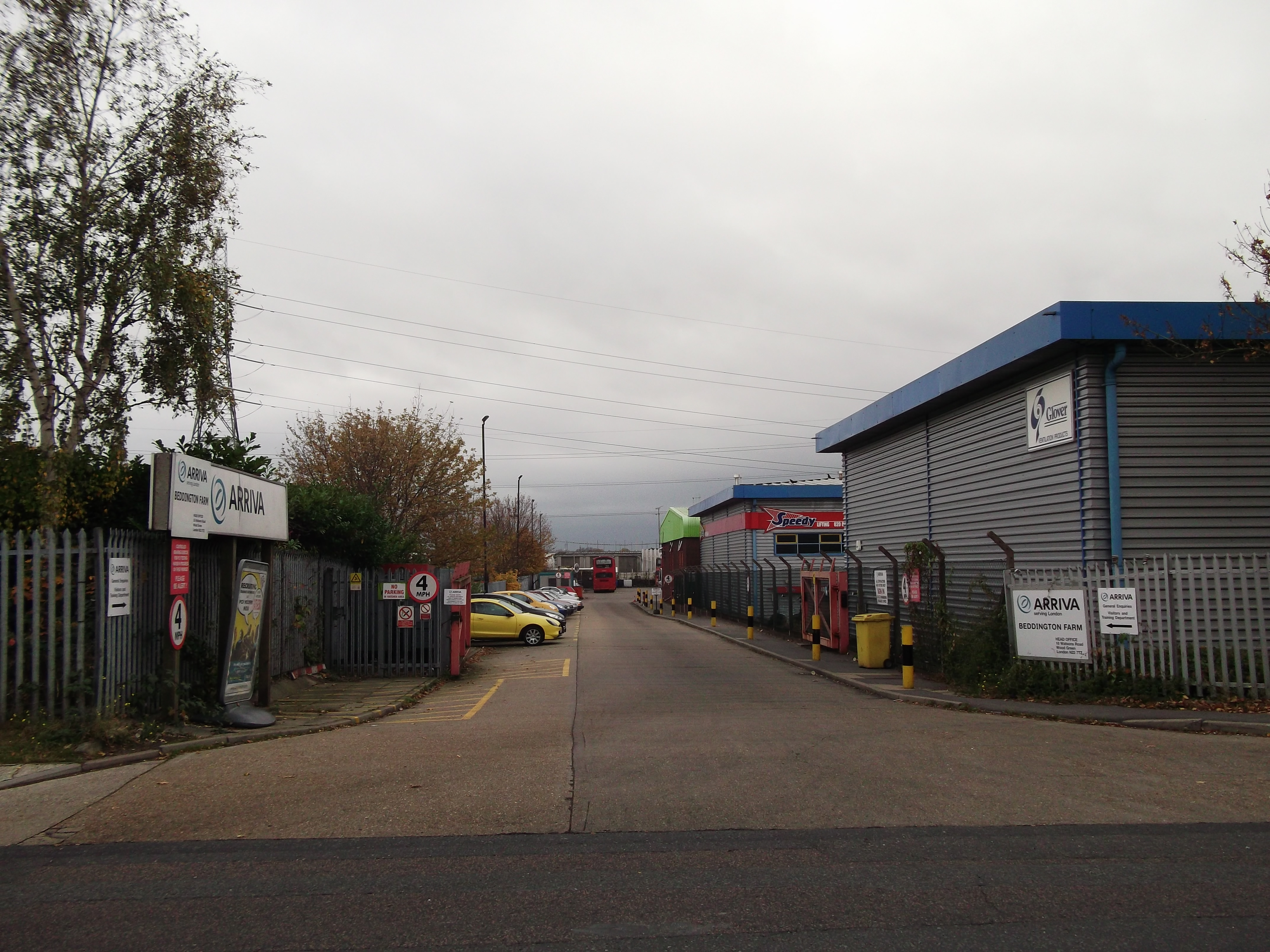
Beddington Farm garage entrance from Beddington Farm Road, October 2011

A modern purpose-built depot that was largely open air. Opened in 1990 by London Country Bus Services, it ran 73 vehicles, although had space for 120. Beddington Farm was to replace the existing garages at Godstone and Chelsham and operated both LB tendered routes and existing London Country Croydon area routes. Beddington Farm became a Londonlinks depot when the Non-London work moved away before coming under Arriva South. It was transferred to Arriva London in 1999 with six routes and buses painted red, green or blue. In 2007 route 450 was transferred to Beddington Garage from Thornton Heath in a swap with route 289.

In July 2011 Arriva confirmed Beddington Farm would close by 31 March 2012.

=== Garston (GR) ===
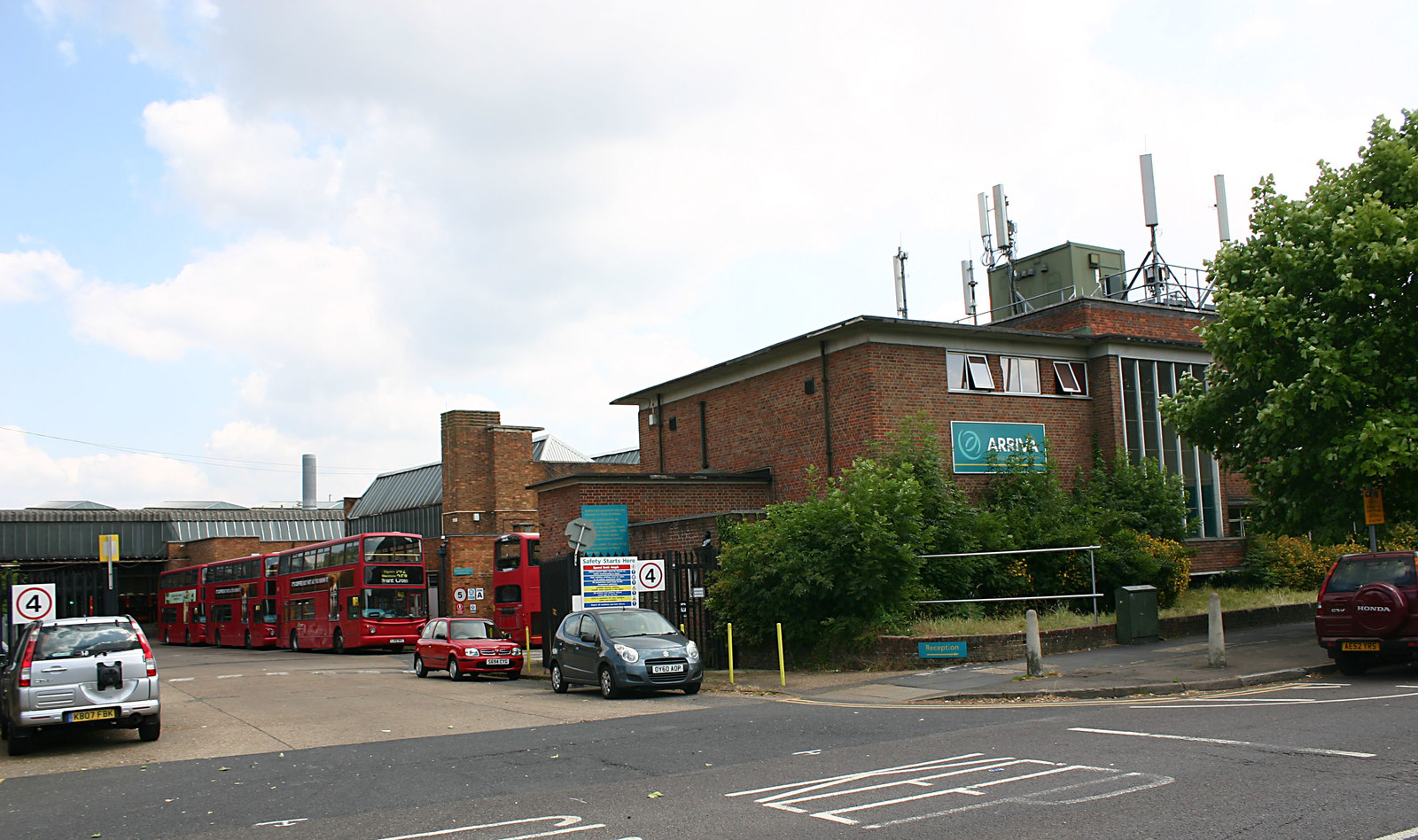
Garston bus garage from St Albans Road, June 2018

Garston garage operated routes 288, 303, 305, H18 and H19.

==== History ====
Opened on 18 June 1952, Garston became part of London Country North West in 1986, being included in the sale of the business to Luton & District Transport in 1988 which in turn was rebranded Arriva Shires & Essex. In 1986 it became a London Regional Transport contractor when it began to operate route 142. As part of a decision to consolidate all of Arriva's Transport for London routes with Arriva London, Garston garage was transferred from Arriva Shires & Essex on 1 January 2016. It closed on 31 August 2018 coinciding with the expiry of its last Transport for London contracts.

=== Heathrow (HE) ===
==== History ====
The depot was originally operated by Tellings-Golden Miller. On 31 May 2014, the garage gained route E10 from Metroline. It used new Alexander Dennis Enviro200 single deckers. As part of a decision to consolidate all of Arriva's Transport for London routes with Arriva London, Heathrow garage was transferred from Tellings-Golden Miller on 1 January 2016.

During December 2017, the operation of route E10 was transferred to London United. As a result, the depot closed soon after.

=== Lee Valley (LV) ===
==== History ====
Lee Valley garage was at the back of an industrial estate alongside the River Lea close to Northumberland Park. The depot was opened in 2005 to house the Mercedes-Benz Citaro articulated buses for route 149 which were later joined by more with the conversion of route 73.

On 1 March 2014, Lee Valley garage closed with the site acquired by National Grid with operations transferred to Edmonton garage, which reopened on the same day.

== Fleet ==
An Alexander Dennis Enviro400 on route 428 at Darent Valley Hospital in May 2026

As of March 2024, the Arriva London fleet consisted of 1,528 buses.

== The Heritage Fleet ==

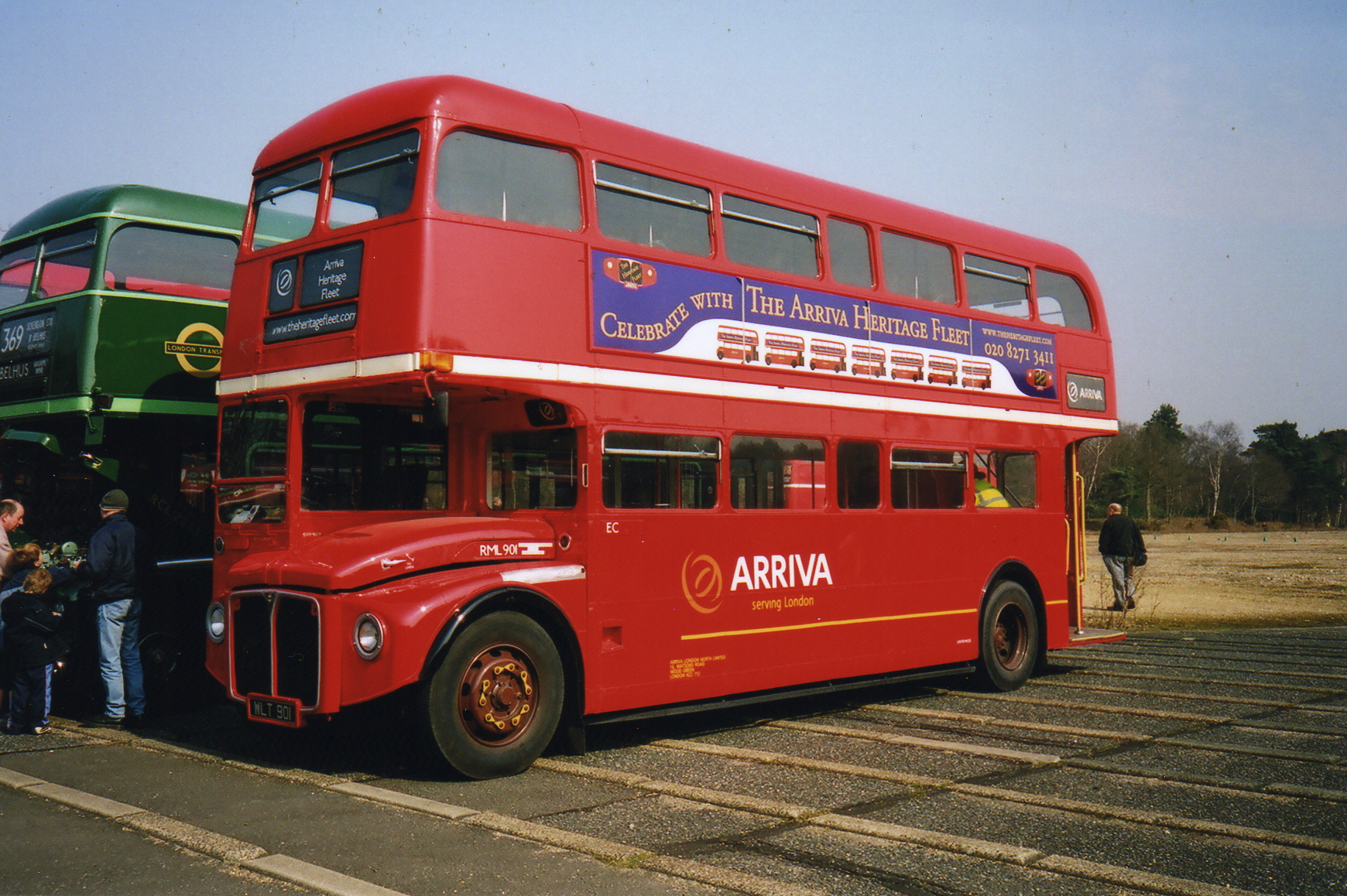
AEC Routemaster RML901 at the 2007 Cobham bus rally, showing the Heritage fleet advertising

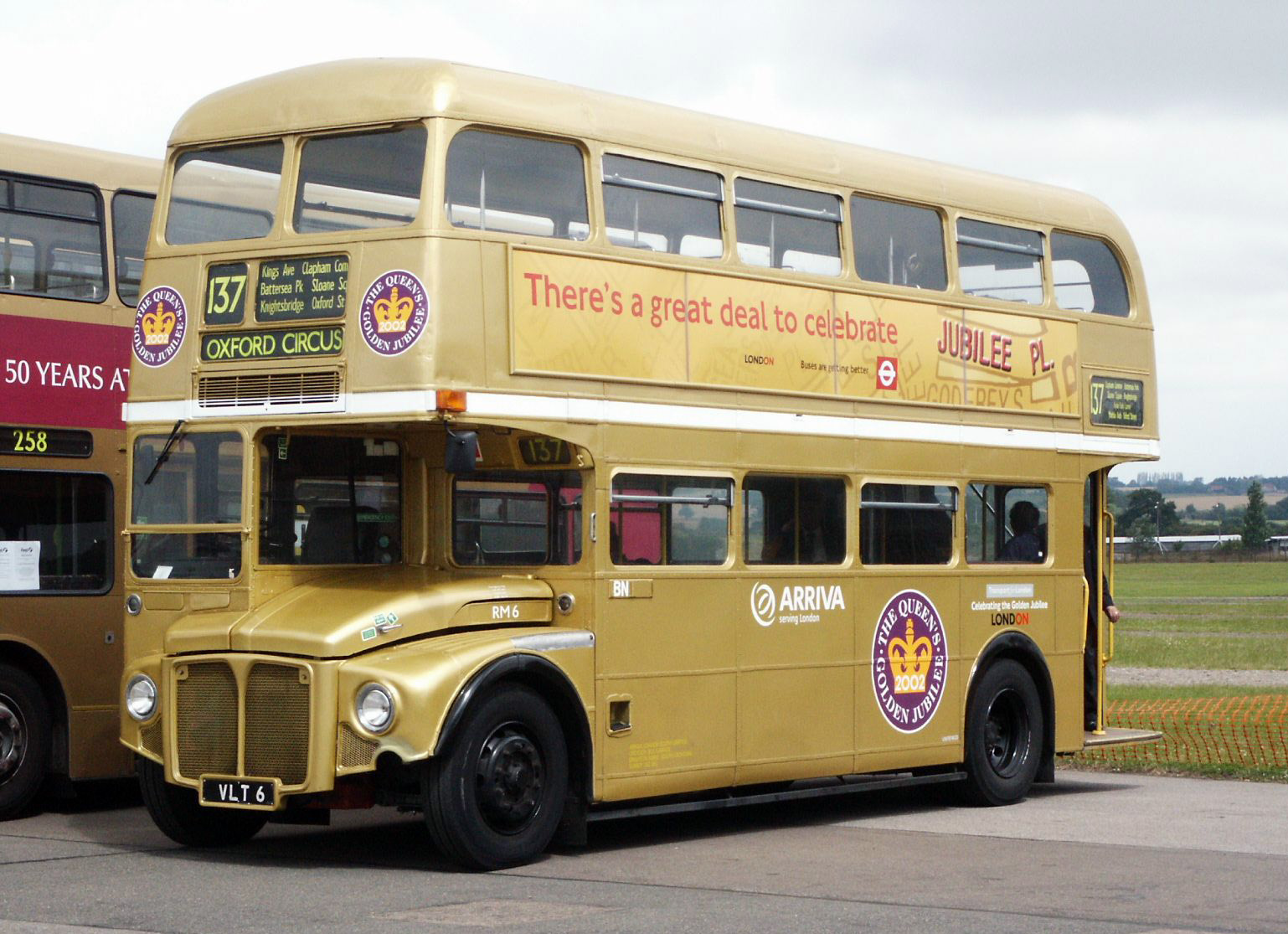
AEC Routemaster RM6 in Queen's Golden Jubilee livery

The Heritage Fleet was operated between 2006 and 2022 by Arriva. It used AEC Routemasters for private hire work, and was formed after Routemasters in London were withdrawn from normal service in December 2005.

=== History ===
Arriva London inherited four Routemaster operator services when it purchased Leaside Buses and South London Transport: routes 19, 38, 73 and 159. Routes 19 and 159 were replaced by one man double deckers and 38 and 73 by Mercedes-Benz Citaro articulated buses. Route 159 was the last London route to be converted on 9 December 2005, bringing 50 years of Routemaster operation to a close.

Following this, Arriva London collected some of the more significant Routemasters in their fleet and set up the Heritage Fleet in early 2006.

In November 2022, Arriva London announced it was putting all vehicles from the Heritage Fleet up for sale by the end of 2022, ending 17 years of service with the division. Routemaster RM2217 operated special services on route 137 on 2 December to commemorate the end of the Heritage Fleet, with proceeds from the event being donated to the Royal British Legion.

=== Operations ===
The Heritage Fleet offered their vehicles for private hire, such as events celebration and weddings. The buses were also hired to attend other public events, and often the buses appeared at bus events, such as Showbus and the London Bus Preservation Trust Cobham bus rally.

=== Fleet ===
The Heritage Fleet was made up of nine AEC Routemasters. As Arriva was the biggest operator of Routemasters before they were withdrawn from normal services, they operated some of the most significant Routemasters. These included;

- RM5: This is the lowest numbered production Routemaster, although RM8 was actually built first.
- RM6: In 2002, this Routemaster was painted in a gold livery to celebrate the Queen's Golden Jubilee, the livery which it now carries.
- RML901: This was part of the first batch of 24 RMLs (Routemaster Lengthened) to enter service.
- RM1124: This was retained as it contains a Cummins Euro II engine, meaning it already meets emission standards to be set for London.
- RMC1453: This was the first production Green Line Routemaster Coach.
- RMC1464: This is an open top bus, so is popular for private hires.
- RM2217: The last production standard length Routemaster built. This bus operated the final regular Routemaster service in December 2005.
- RML2355: This is still in the condition as when it left service, but is awaiting restoration. It is unusual in retaining its original body and chassis after the Routemaster overhaul scheme.
- RML2360: This is being looked after for the London Transport Museum. It has been converted inside for exhibition use.
