= Battersea station (disambiguation) =

Battersea station may refer to the following locations in Battersea, London.

- Battersea railway station, a closed railway station on the West London Extension Railway that operated from 1863 to 1940
- Battersea Park railway station, a current railway station at the junction of the South London Line and Brighton Main Line
- Battersea Park railway station (1860–1870), a closed railway station on the London, Brighton and South Coast Railway open between 1860 and 1870
- Battersea Park Road railway station, a closed railway station near the existing Battersea Park railway station
- Battersea Power Station tube station, a London Underground station
- Queenstown Road (Battersea) railway station, a current railway station between Vaxuhall and Clapham Junction railway stations
- Battersea Power Station, a former power station and now neighbourhood in south west London
