= QRB =

QRB may refer to:

- Qualitätssicherungssystem Recycling Baustoffe
- The Quarterly Review of Biology
- Queenstown Road railway station has National Rail code QRB
- QRB is Q code for "What is your distance?"
- Qué Rica Bieja
