= London Buses route 29 =

London bus route

29
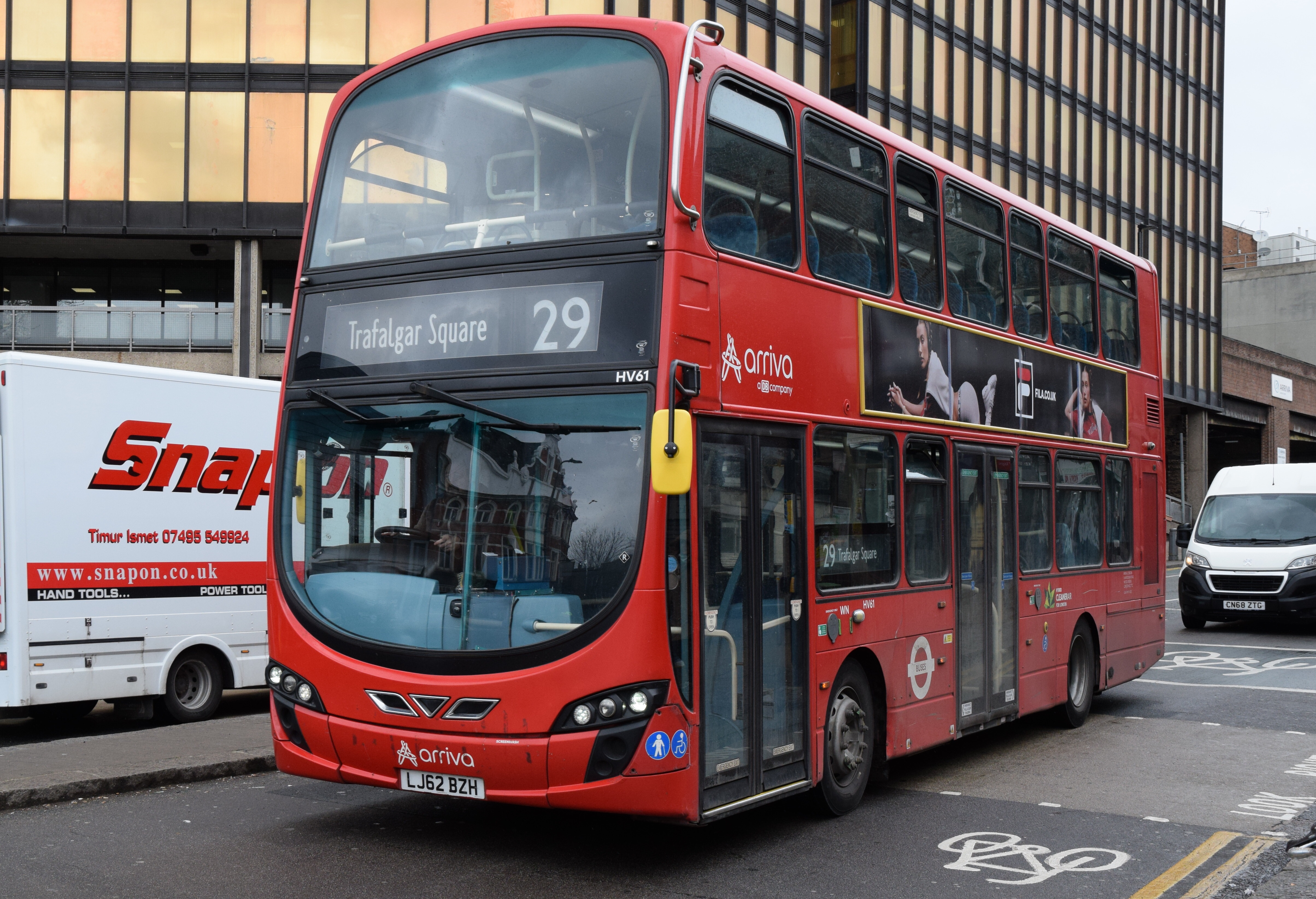
- Arriva London Wright Eclipse Gemini 2 bodied Volvo B5LH at Wood Green station in April 2023

Overview
- Operator: Arriva London
- Garage: Wood Green
- Vehicle: Volvo B5LH Wright Eclipse Gemini 2 Volvo B5LH Wright Gemini 3
- Peak vehicle requirement: 31
- Night-time: Night Bus N29

Route
- Start: Trafalgar Square
- Via: Camden Town; Holloway; Finsbury Park
- End: Wood Green station

London Buses route 29 is a Transport for London contracted bus route in London, England. Running between Trafalgar Square and Wood Green station, it is operated by Arriva London.

== History ==
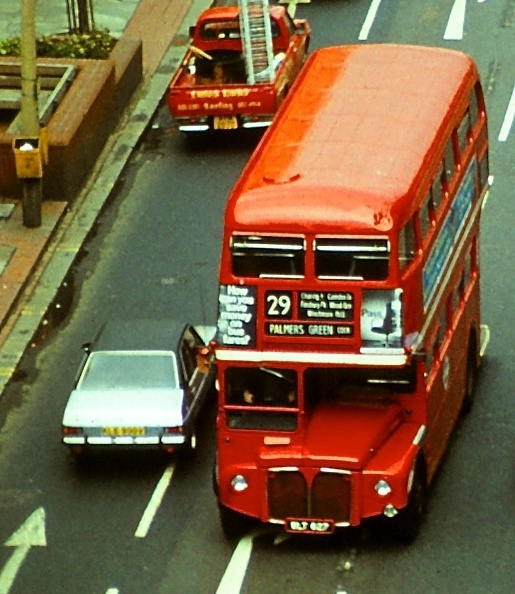
London Transport AEC Routemaster on Wood Green High Road in April 1981

Today's route 29 traces its history back to a daily route between Victoria and Wood Green via Whitehall, Charing Cross Road, Camden Town, Seven Sisters Road and Green Lanes, Harringay, which began operation on 20 November 1911.

By 1949, the route had been extended northwards to serve South Mimms, travelling on from Wood Green via Palmers Green, Southgate, Cockfosters, Hadley Wood and Potters Bar. At peak hours on weekdays the route extended further to Borehamwood. This was changed in 1951 so the route terminated at the Elstree Way Hotel instead of Borehamwood. Additional journeys on Tuesdays, Thursdays and weekends were introduced in 1953, serving Clare Hall Hospital. Three years later, the service was withdrawn from Potters Bar and South Mimms, only to be reinstated after just three months.

Route 29A terminated at Oakwood station.

The route was changed again in 1968, with the Monday to Saturday service from Southgate northwards being replaced by new route 298, and route 298A to Oakwood (except on Saturdays, when new route 125A provided service). Route 29 did, however, continue north from Southgate to Cockfosters station at peak hours on weekdays. The Sunday service between Southgate and South Mimms was replaced two years later by new route 299. Late journeys on Monday to Saturday were also changed to terminate at The Triangle in Palmers Green at this time. In 1977, the Southgate portion of the route was withdrawn completely, with the route instead continuing northwards from Palmers Green through Winchmore Hill to Enfield Town.

The route continued to operate between Victoria and Enfield Town for the next 14 years, being served by a fleet of AEC Routemasters operating out of Palmers Green garage.

In 1988, the route was converted to single person double deck operation. A proposal by Capital Citybus to operate the route using 30 tri-axle Leyland Olympian double-decker buses in 1991, personally submitted by company owner Tsui Tsin-tong and Ensign Citybus managing director Leon Daniels, was rejected by London Regional Transport, then in charge of tendering the route, and the route was retained by incumbent operator Leaside Buses.

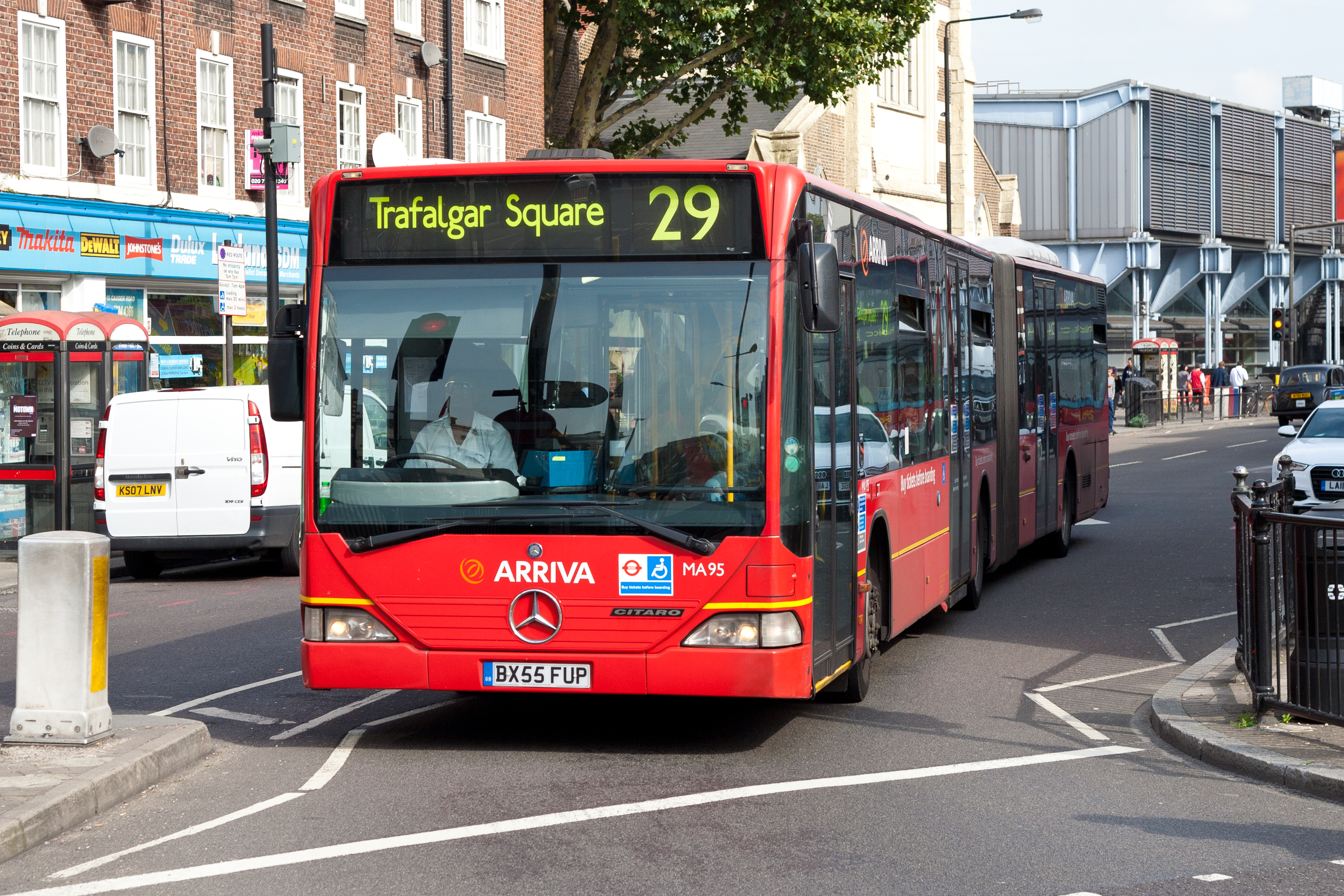
Arriva London Mercedes-Benz O530G in September 2011

On 14 January 2006, Mercedes-Benz O530G articulated buses were introduced. It was reported that operation of the route by articulated vehicles cost around £1.6 million more per year than double-deck operation.

In April 2006, the route's stop in Tottenham Court Road was relocated and a bus lane extended to provide more space for passengers and vehicles.

In November 2011, operation of the route was switched from articulated buses to double-decker buses.

On 5 and 6 February 2014, nine AEC Routemasters were used on the route during a London Underground strike.

== The route today ==
The route is noted for its high crime rate, and in January 2008 was London's third most dangerous bus route, according to figures released by Transport for London. In February 2010 police presence on the route was increased. This followed a similar increase in early 2005 which had focussed on antisocial behaviour and illegal parking along the route.

In 2015/16 it was the third busiest route in London with 15.5 million passengers.

In 2021, the service frequency during peak times Monday to Friday was reduced from 12 buses per hour to 10.

== Current route ==
Route 29 operates via these primary locations:

- Trafalgar Square for Charing Cross station
- Leicester Square station
- Cambridge Circus
- Tottenham Court Road station
- Goodge Street station
- Warren Street station
- Mornington Crescent station
- Camden Town station
- Camden Road station
- Holloway Nag's Head
- Finsbury Park station
- Blackstock Road
- Manor House station
- Harringay Green Lanes station
- Turnpike Lane station
- Wood Green station
