= London Buses route 73 =

London bus route

73
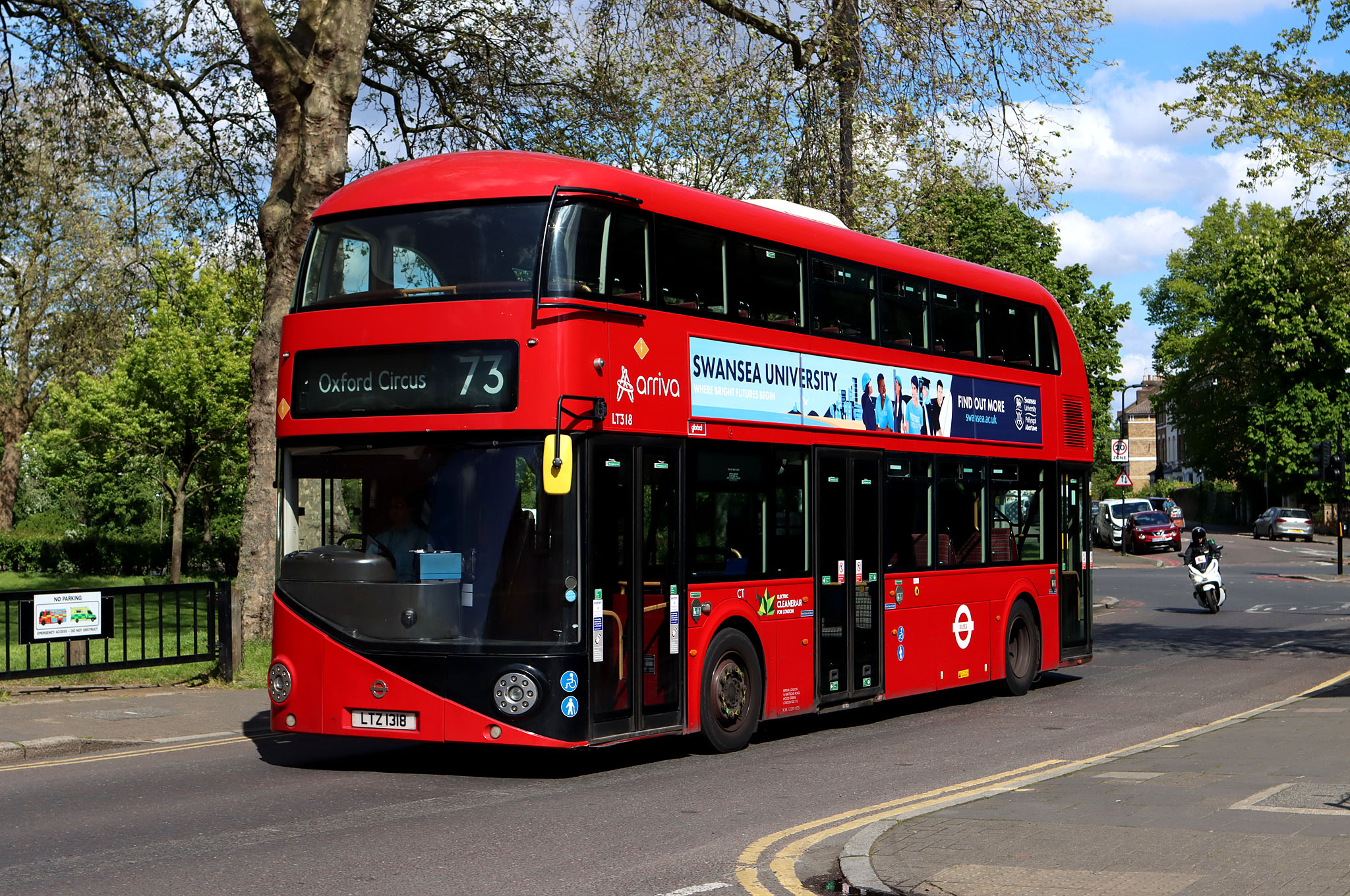
- Arriva London New Routemaster at Stoke Newington Common in April 2024

Overview
- Operator: Arriva London
- Garage: Clapton
- Vehicle: New Routemaster
- Peak vehicle requirement: 29
- Night-time: Night Bus N73

Route
- Start: Oxford Circus station
- Via: King's Cross; Angel; Newington Green
- End: Stoke Newington Common
- Length: 6 miles (9.7 km)

Service
- Level: Daily
- Frequency: About every 3-5 minutes
- Journey time: 40-71 minutes
- Operates: 04:55 until 00:52

London Buses route 73 is a Transport for London contracted bus route in London, England. Running between Oxford Circus station and Stoke Newington Common, it is operated by Arriva London.

== History ==
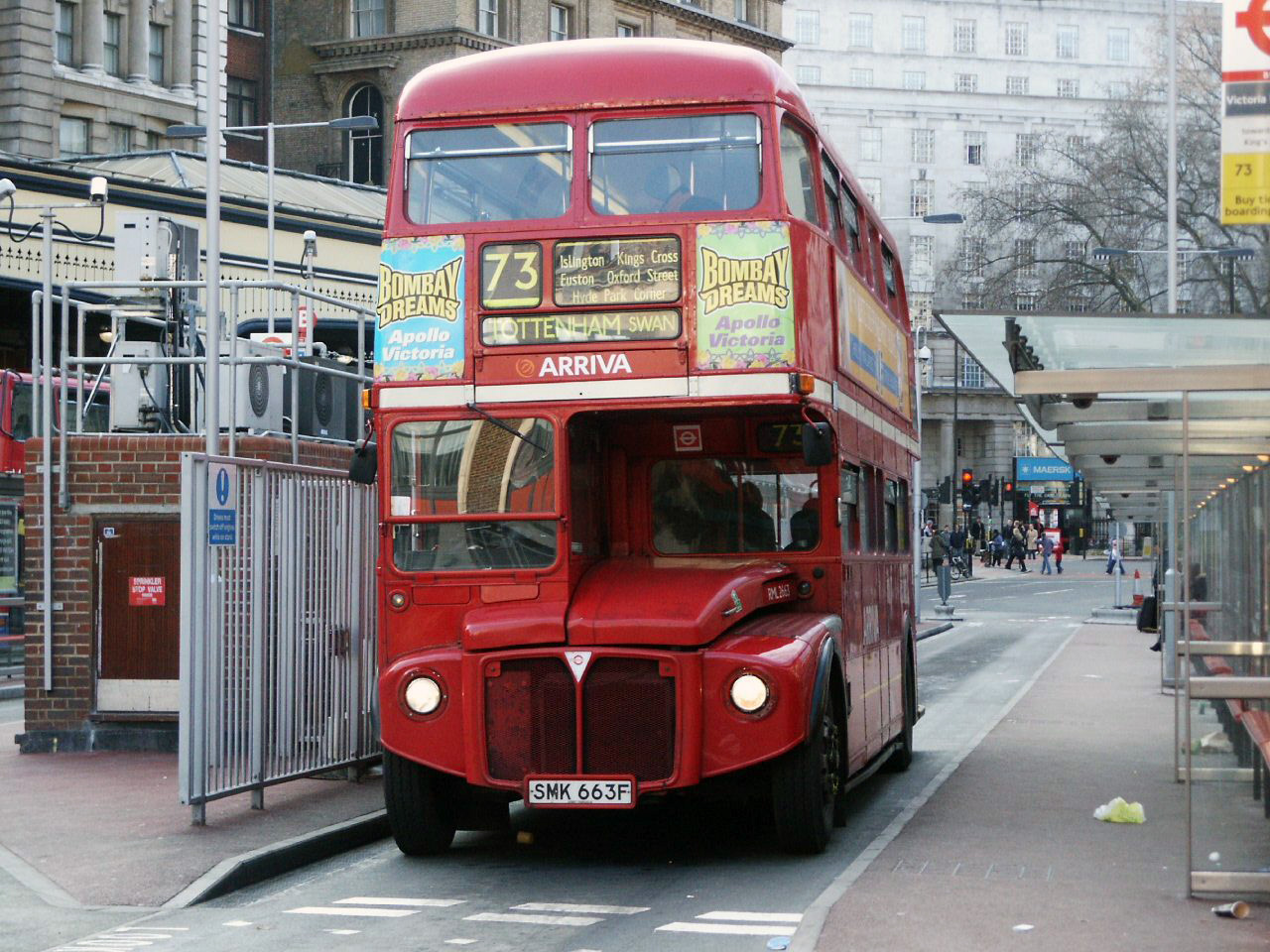
Arriva London AEC Routemaster at Victoria bus station in March 2004

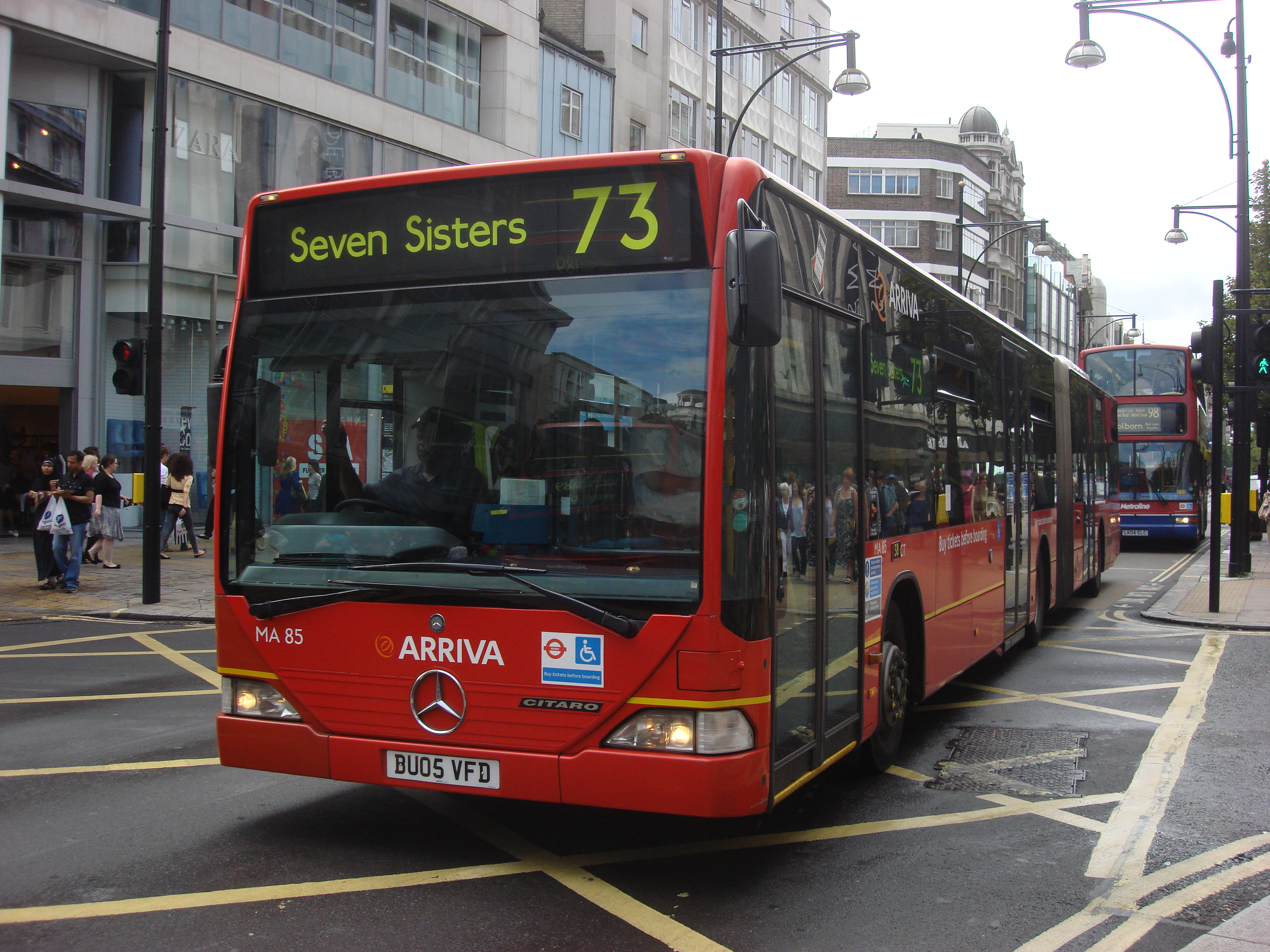
Arriva London Mercedes-Benz O530G on Oxford Street in July 2010

Route 73 commenced on 30 November 1914, and originally ran from King's Cross to Barnes via Euston Road, Tottenham Court Road, Oxford Street, Knightsbridge, Kensington and Hammersmith.

By 1949, the route had been extended at both ends to operate from Stoke Newington to Richmond. It was extended further west to Hounslow on 26 November 1958, replacing route 33. This latter route was reinstated between Hammersmith and Richmond in 1966, with route 73 curtailed at Hammersmith on weekdays, continuing to Richmond on Saturdays and Hounslow on Sundays.

The weekend service was cut back to Twickenham in October 1978, and back to Hammersmith in September 1982. On 13 August 1988, the route was diverted at Hyde Park Corner to Victoria bus station, being replaced by route 10 west of Hyde Park Corner.

In August 1994, the route—at the time operated by Leaside Buses—was used to test satellite monitoring of buses in an effort to reduce bunching.

On 4 September 2004, route 73 was converted to one-man operation, with the AEC Routemasters replaced by Mercedes-Benz O530G articulated buses. This change was intended to improve peak capacity and decrease boarding times; however, a Transport for London advertising campaign to this effect was prohibited by the Advertising Standards Agency as the claims were misleading. Fare evasion on the route increased after the introduction of articulated vehicles, leading some passengers to nickname the route 'seventy-free'. The route was used to test the iBus system in 2007.

On 3 September 2011, Arriva London commenced a new contract with operation transferred to Stamford Hill garage and the route converted back to double-deck operation with 20 hybrid Wright Eclipse Gemini 2 bodied Volvo B5LHs and the balance diesel Wright Gemini 2 DL bodied VDL DB300s. The route was discontinued between Seven Sisters and Stoke Newington. In December 2012, route 73 was converted to full hybrid operation with Wright Eclipse Gemini 2 bodied Volvo B5LHs. New Routemasters were introduced on 16 May 2015.

The bus route passes many tourist attractions such as the British Library and Clissold Park. The Daily Telegraph called the route one of the "best routes for sightseeing on a shoestring". In August 2014, two buses on the route were fitted with equipment designed to enhance bus drivers' awareness of pedestrians and cyclists as part of a six-week trial. The route was chosen because it was "most likely to encounter packed seas of distracted shopping people and cyclists".

Route 73 was withdrawn between Oxford Circus and Victoria on 17 June 2017, with route 390 replacing the withdrawn section.

== Current route ==
Route 73 operates via these primary locations:

- Oxford Circus station
- Tottenham Court Road station
- Goodge Street station
- Warren Street station
- Euston Square station
- Euston bus station for Euston station
- British Library
- St Pancras station
- King's Cross station
- Angel station
- Islington Green
- Essex Road station
- Newington Green
- Stoke Newington Town Hall
- Abney Park
- Stoke Newington Common
