= London Buses route 137 =

London bus route

137
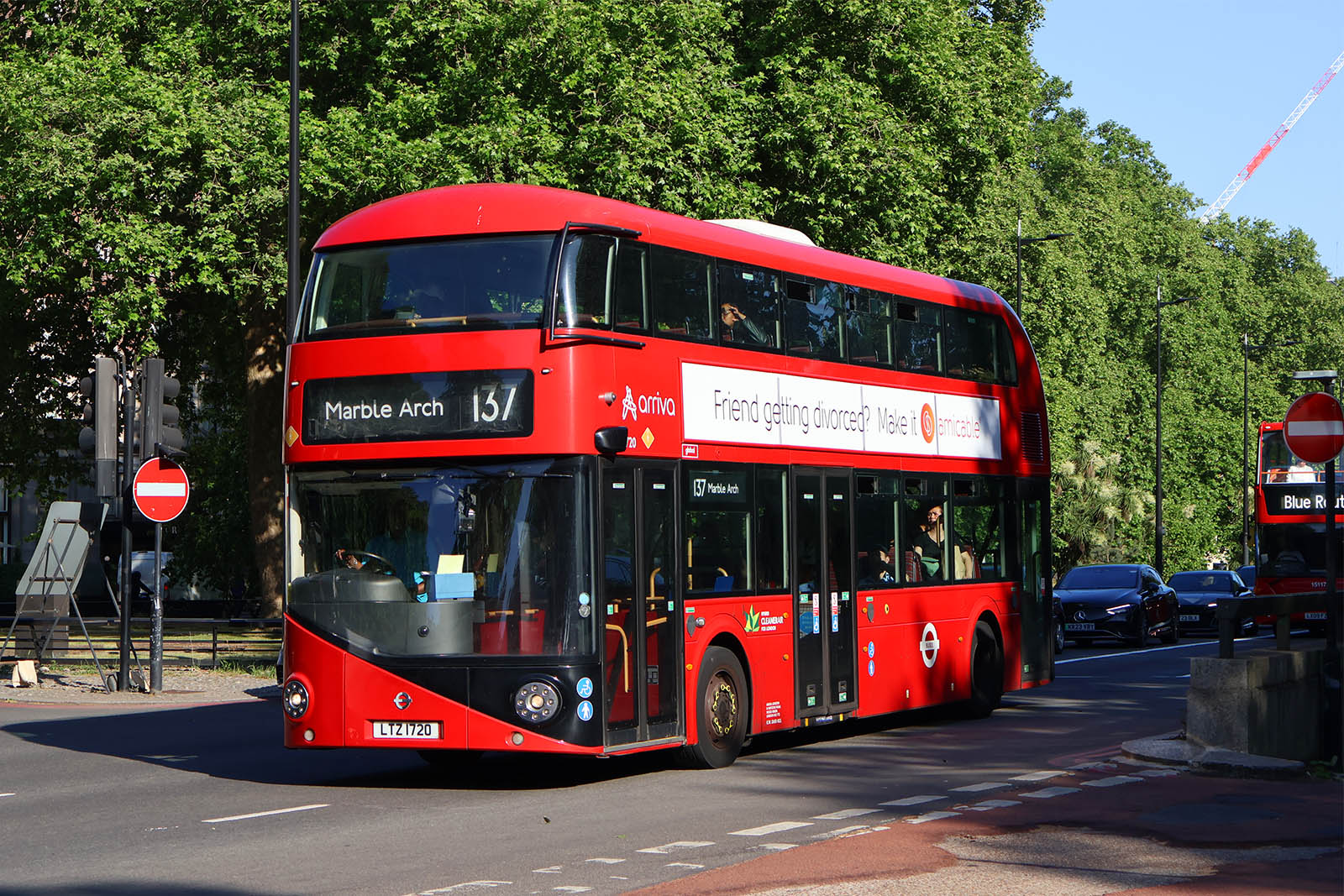
- Arriva London New Routemaster on Park Lane in May 2025

Overview
- Operator: Arriva London
- Garage: Brixton
- Vehicle: New Routemaster
- Peak vehicle requirement: 29
- Night-time: Night Bus N137

Route
- Start: Marble Arch station
- Via: Hyde Park Corner; Sloane Square; Battersea; Clapham Common
- End: Streatham Hill

London Buses route 137 is a Transport for London contracted bus route in London, England. Running between Marble Arch station and Streatham Hill, it is operated by Arriva London.

== History ==
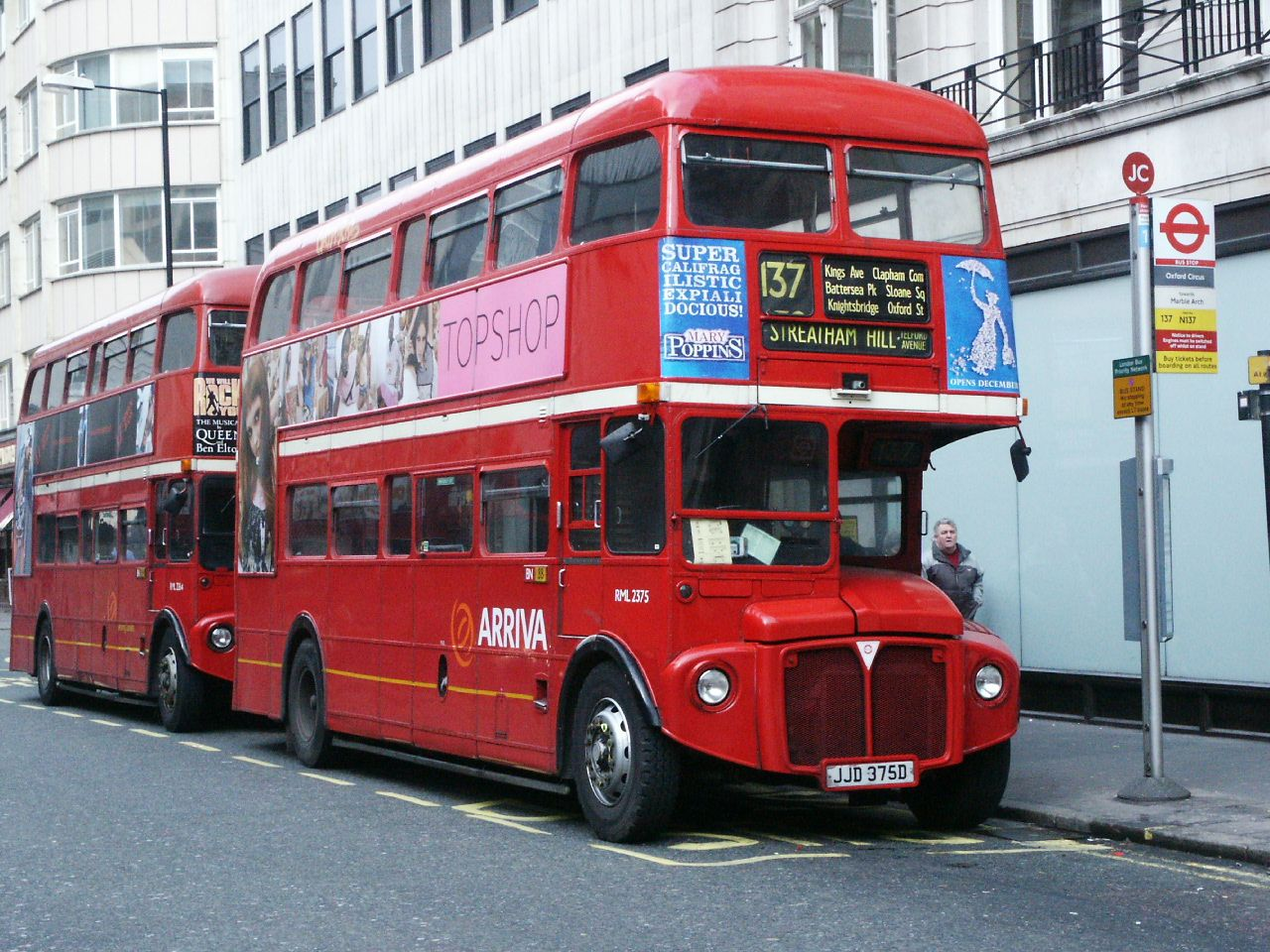
Arriva London AEC Routemaster at Oxford Circus in March 2004

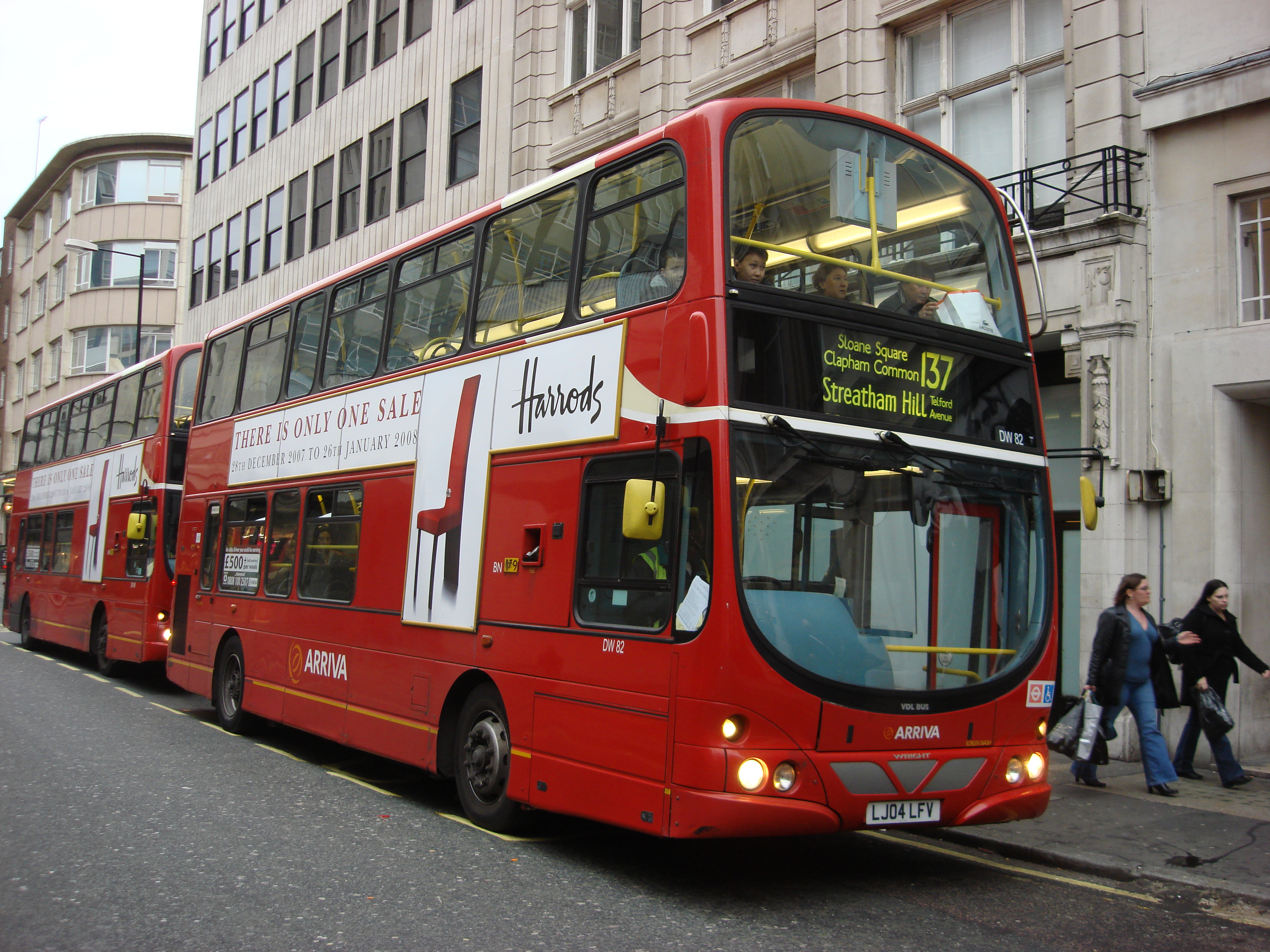
Arriva London Wright Pulsar Gemini bodied DAF DB250LF at Oxford Circus in December 2007

In the 1930s, STL buses were used on this route which ran from Highgate to Elmers End.

The AEC Routemaster buses which operated route 137 since 1 November 1964 were replaced by one-person operated Wright Pulsar Gemini bodied DAF DB250s on 10 July 2004, ending a remarkable forty years of service

New Routemasters were introduced on 6 December 2014. The rear platform remains closed at all times except for when the bus is at bus stops.

On 15 July 2017 route 137 was permanently curtailed to Marble Arch and no longer serves Oxford Street.

== Current route ==
Route 137 operates via these primary locations:

- Marble Arch station
- Hyde Park Corner station
- Knightsbridge station
- Sloane Square station
- Lister Hospital
- Battersea Park station
- Queenstown Road station
- Clapham Common station
- Clapham Park
- Streatham Hill
