= SRT-129 =

SRT-129 is a medium-sized fishing trawler. It was built in the 1950s for the USSR in the German Democratic Republic. Since 2007, it has been one of the exhibits at the Museum of the World Ocean in Kaliningrad. It is the only museum fishing vessel in Russia.

== History ==
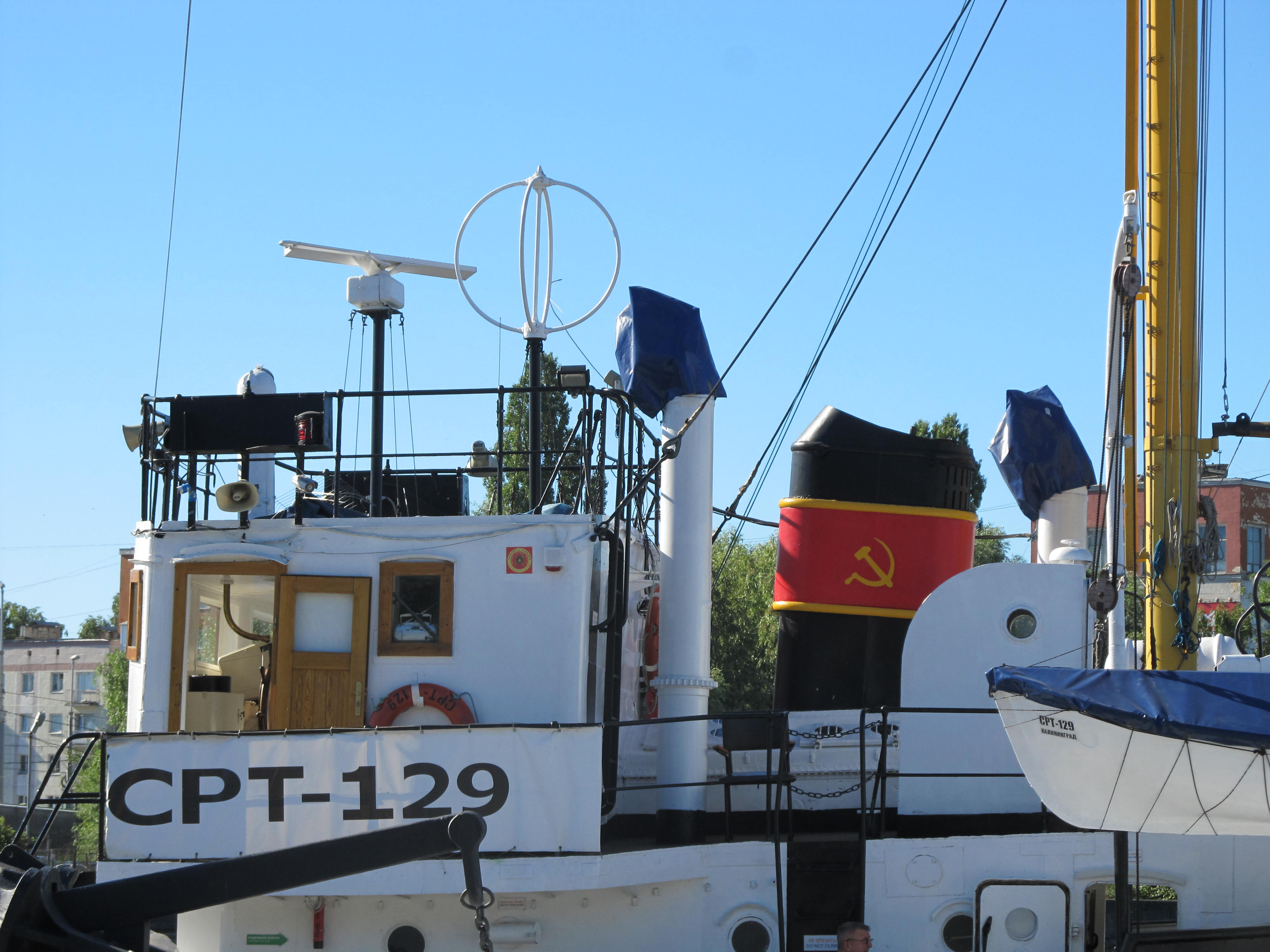
Captain's cabin of SRT-129

SRT-129 was one of many vessels of this type (medium fishing trawler) built in the 1940s—1950s in the German Democratic Republic based on the SRT-300/SRT-400 project, ordered by the Soviet Union (yard number 691, registry number 234888). These ships started fishing in the southeastern Baltic Sea and organized herring expeditions to the Faroe Islands. Due to the limited autonomy (only five days), these vessels were operated in fishing fleets managed by so-called mother ships.

Typically, such vessels had short lifespans. They were designed for quick payback and, once out of service, were scrapped rather than repaired. However, SRT-129 had a different fate. After a brief service as a fishing vessel, it was transferred to the Soviet Navy, which used it for marine and ship measurements, in a less demanding role than in the fishing fleet. In 1996, the vessel was handed over by the military to the Kaliningrad Sea Fishing Port. The port installed the vessel as a monument to the history of the fishing industry.

At the time, the vessel was not accessible to the general public (as the port was a restricted area). Therefore, in 2007, SRT-129 was transferred to the Museum of the World Ocean, which already had four museum ships (three in Kaliningrad and one in Saint Petersburg).

On August 20, 2007, after a second attempt, two tugboats moved SRT-129 to its new mooring place. After restoration, which was planned to take one year, the vessel was opened to visitors.

On April 9, 2008, during the restoration, a fire broke out on SRT-129: the wooden paneling and insulation of the trawler's deckhouse caught fire. Kaliningrad firefighters managed to extinguish the fire and save the historic vessel. Welding works were cited as the likely cause of the fire.

The ship hosts an exhibition on the history of Russia's fishing fleet, including the history of fishing in the Kaliningrad region.
