= Class SRT =

Class of London bus

The SRT was a class of London bus introduced in 1949. It was a rebuild of the pre-war STL type, an AEC Regent I with 7.7-litre engine, fitted with an RT-type body. These were underpowered due to the additional weight of the RT body, and they were confined to central London routes, e.g. 24. As new RT chassis became available, the bodies were transferred and the STL chassis scrapped.
