= Queenstown Road railway station =

National Rail station in London, England

Queenstown Road
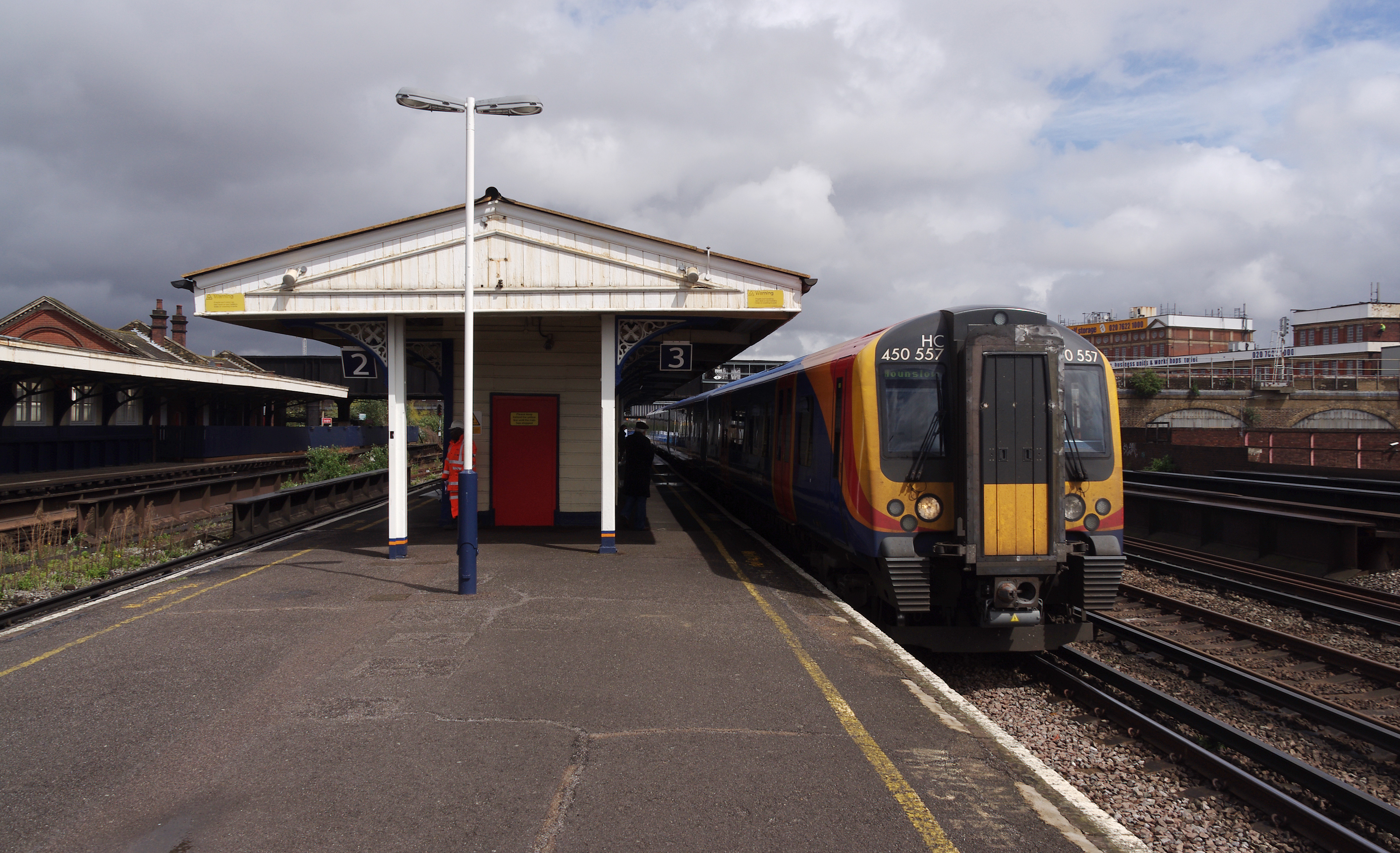
- Interactive map of Queenstown Road

General information
- Location: Battersea
- Local authority: London Borough of Wandsworth
- Managed by: South Western Railway
- Station code: QRB
- DfT category: F1
- Number of platforms: 3 (2 in use)
- Fare zone: 2
- OSI: Battersea Park; Battersea Power Station

National Rail annual entry and exit
- 2020–21: ▼0.479 million
- 2021–22: ▲0.936 million
- 2022–23: ▼0.853 million
- 2023–24: ▼0.736 million
- 2024–25: ▲0.806 million

Key dates
- 1 November 1877: Opened as Queen's Road (Battersea)
- 12 May 1980: Renamed Queenstown Road (Battersea)

Other information
- External links: Departures; Facilities
- Coordinates: 51.4748°N 0.147°W

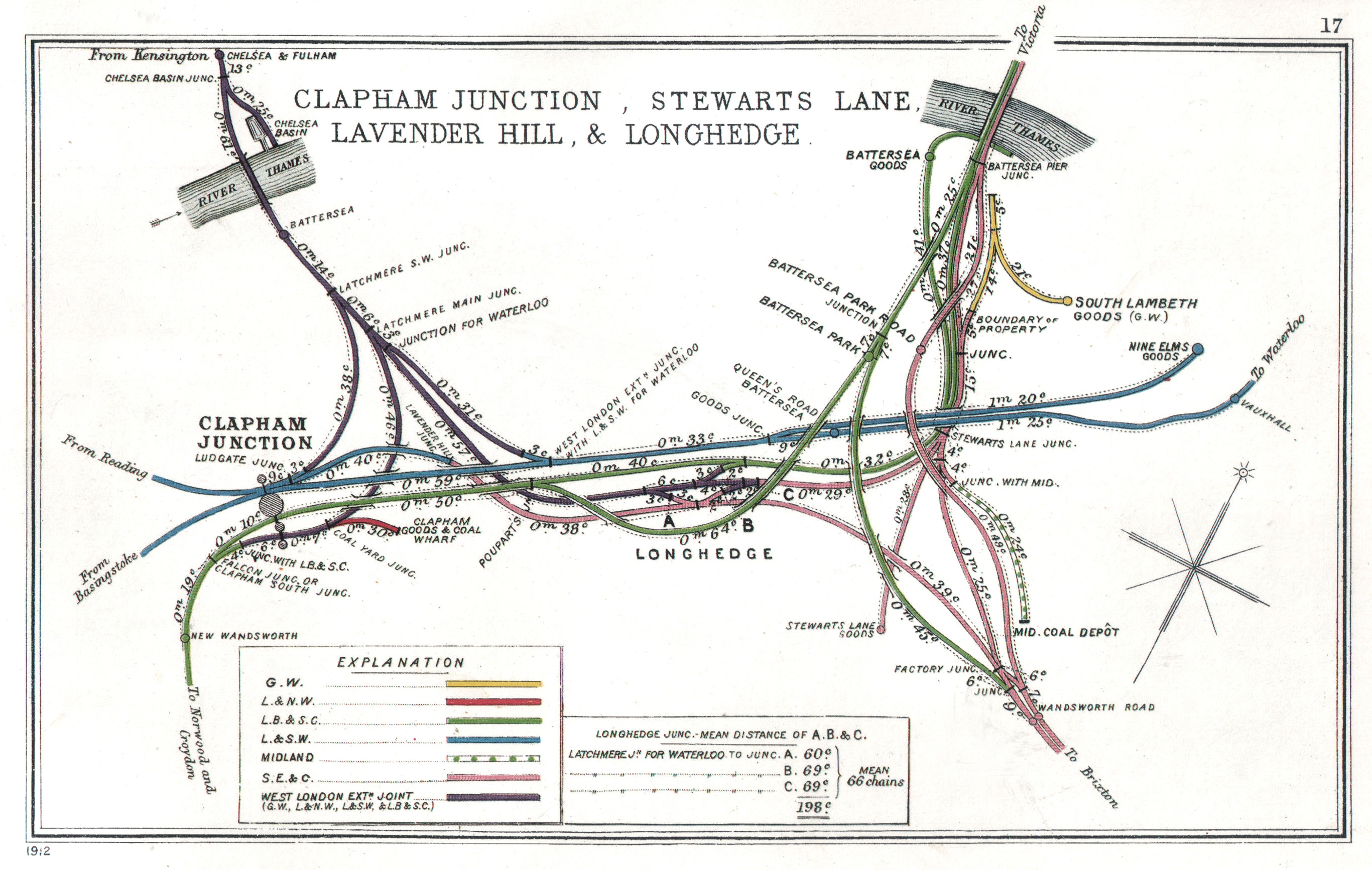
A 1912 Railway Clearing House map of lines around Queenstown Road railway station (shown here as Queen's Road Battersea)

Queenstown Road is a railway station in inner south-west London, 2 miles 50 chains (4.2 km) south-west of London Waterloo, between Vauxhall and Clapham Junction. It is a short walk from Battersea Park station and Battersea Park to the west. It has three platforms, two of which are in use by all stopping services related to the Waterloo to Reading Line: its branch services to Weybridge (via Hounslow) and two separate sets of bidirectional Waterloo-to-Waterloo services via Hounslow using the Hounslow Loop and via Kingston using the Kingston Loop. In addition, 50% of maximum peak hour trains serving the Shepperton branch line call at the station.

== History ==
The station was opened on 1 November 1877, by the London and South Western Railway, as Queen's Road (Battersea). The entrance still bears the name Queen's Road, not to be confused with Queens Road Peckham, Walthamstow Queen's Road or Queensway Underground station, which was also originally called Queens Road.

Queen's Road was also the name of the road in which the station is located. Named after Queen Victoria, after the Second World War the street's name was changed to Queenstown Road. The station was renamed Queenstown Road (Battersea), to go with the road, on 12 May 1980. The station's modern entrance and platform signage lacks the "(Battersea)" suffix that appears in timetables and on some maps. The latest "Oyster Rail Services" map produced by Transport for London shows the station as plain "Queenstown Road". On the map produced by the station managers, South Western Railway, the station is called "Queenstown Road".

The station is Grade II listed.

== Services ==
All services at Queenstown Road are operated by South Western Railway.

The typical off-peak service in trains per hour is:

- 4 tph to London Waterloo
- 2 tph to Teddington via Richmond, returning to London Waterloo via Kingston and Wimbledon
- 2 tph to Weybridge via Hounslow

Additional services call at the station during the peak hours.

Preceding station	National Rail	Following station
Vauxhall	South Western Railway South West Main Line	Clapham Junction

== Connections ==
London Buses routes 137, 156, 452 and night route N137 serve the station.

== Future ==
Network Rail plans to reopen Platform 1 at Queenstown Road to permit the segregation of Windsor and Mainline services flows, providing additional capacity on the approach to London Waterloo.
