= East Lancs European =

Single-deck bus body on Scania L113CRL chassis

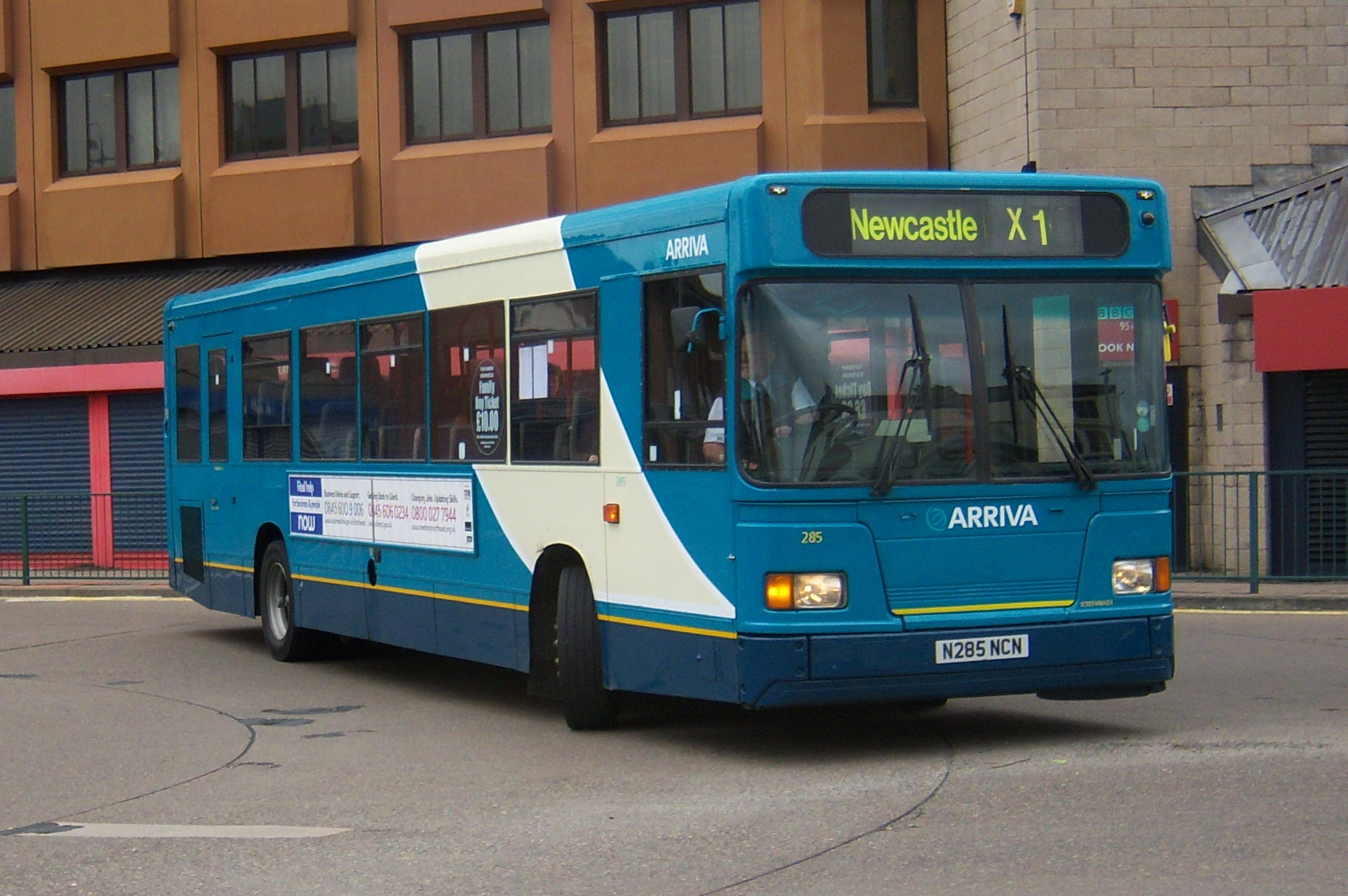
- Arriva Northumbria Scania L113CRL bodied European at Middlesbrough bus station in 2009

Overview
- Manufacturer: East Lancashire Coachbuilders
- Production: 1995–1996

Body and chassis
- Doors: 1 door
- Floor type: Step entrance
- Chassis: Scania L113CRL

Powertrain
- Engine: Scania

Dimensions
- Length: 11950mm
- Width: 2500mm
- Height: 3000mm

Chronology
- Predecessor: East Lancs MaxCi
- Successor: East Lancs Flyte

The East Lancs European was a step entrance single-decker bus body that was built on the Scania L113CRL chassis by East Lancashire Coachbuilders during 1995 and 1996.

A step-entrance design, it was similar in appearance to the low-floor MaxCi on the N113CRL, but had a straight window line as opposed to a stepped/sloped one.

== History ==
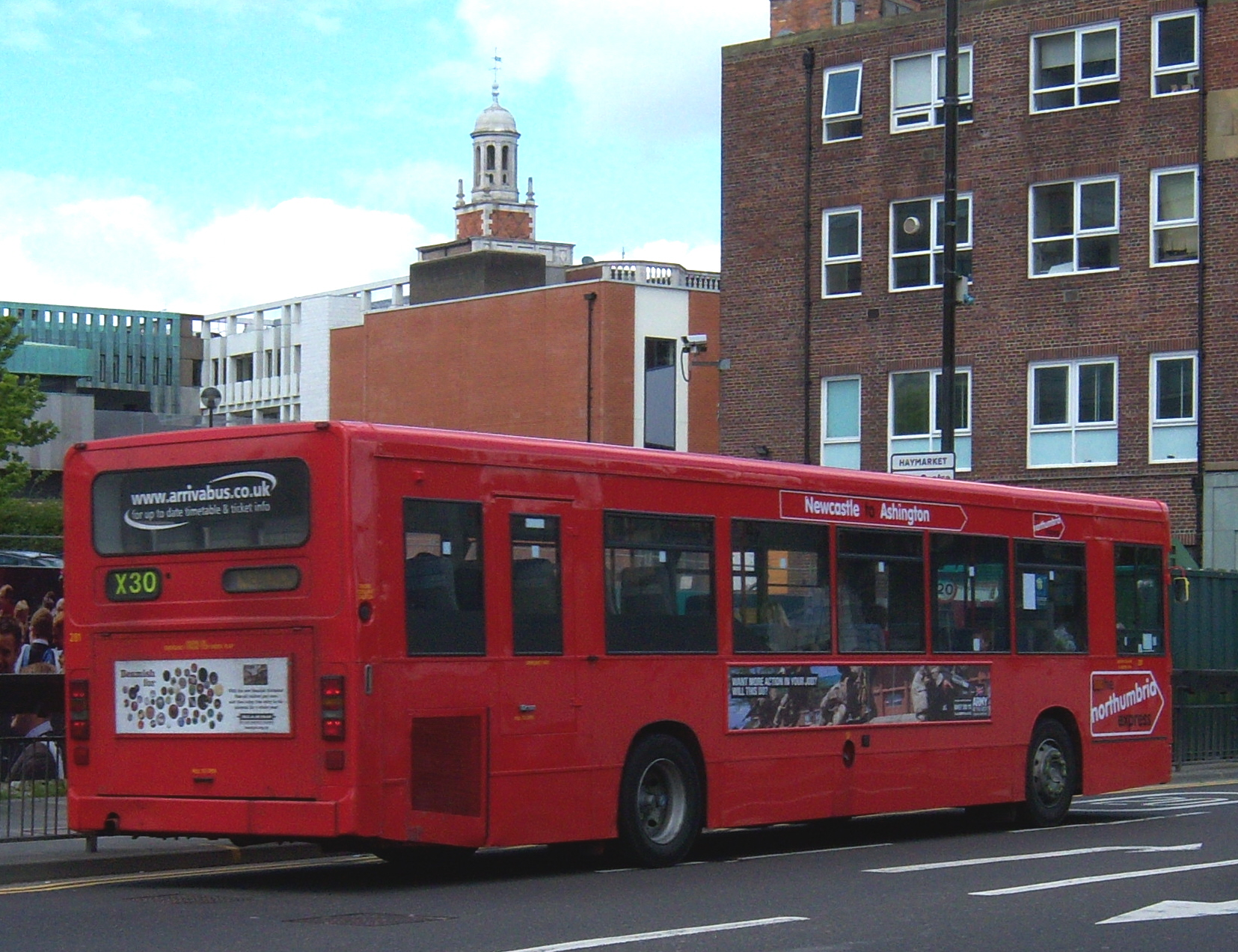
Rear of Arriva North East Scania L113CRL bodied European in Newcastle in May 2009

A total of 79 Europeans were built, of which besides five that were purchased by Yorkshire Traction, 59 were purchased by companies owned by the British Bus group. These companies were Luton & District (taking 27), Northumbria Motor Services (20), Midland Fox (14), Clydeside 2000 (eight) and Derby City Transport (five).

The European was superseded in late 1996 by the Flyte.
