= East Lancs MaxCi =

Low-floor bus body on Scania N113CRL chassis

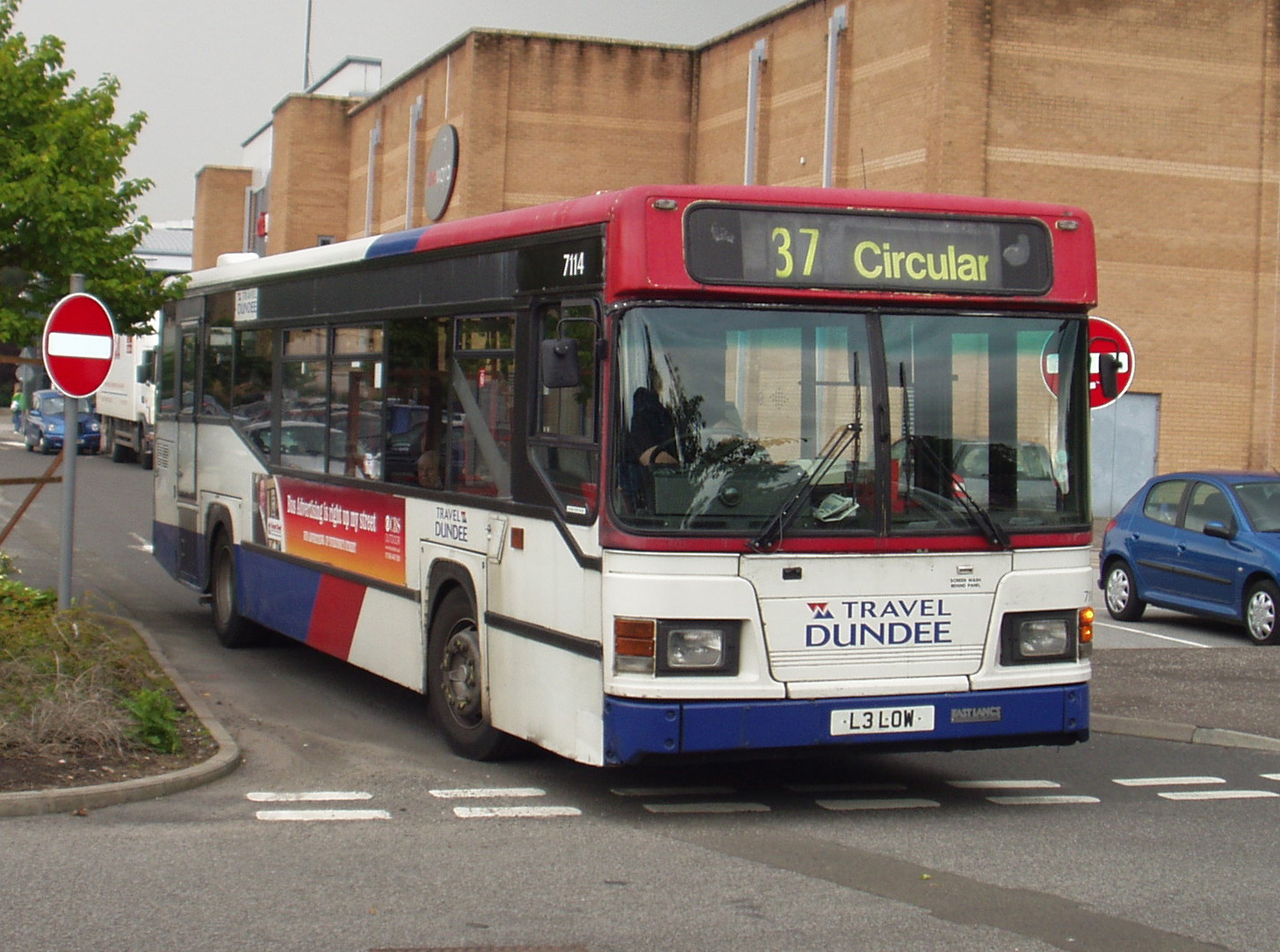
- A Travel Dundee East Lancs MaxCi bodied Scania N113CRL

Overview
- Manufacturer: East Lancashire Coachbuilders
- Production: 1993-1995

Body and chassis
- Doors: Single door (front door only)
- Floor type: Low floor Low entry
- Chassis: Scania N113CRL

Powertrain
- Engine: Scania

Dimensions
- Length: 11250mm
- Width: 2500mm
- Height: 3000mm

Chronology
- Successor: East Lancs European

The East Lancs MaxCi was a low-floor single-decker bus body built on the Scania N113CRL chassis by East Lancashire Coachbuilders.

The MaxCi was based on a design produced for the Scania N113CLL low-entry single-decker bus chassis MaxCi in Sweden, and was built for the UK market between 1993 and 1995. Only twelve examples were produced, with nine of these being delivered to British Bus subsidiaries Midland Red North and Clydeside 2000, and one being delivered to Tayside.

The MaxCi was superseded by the step-entrance European on the Scania L113CRL chassis.

== See also ==
- List of buses
