= East Lancs Spryte =

Low floor bus body on Dennis Dart SLF and Volvo chassis

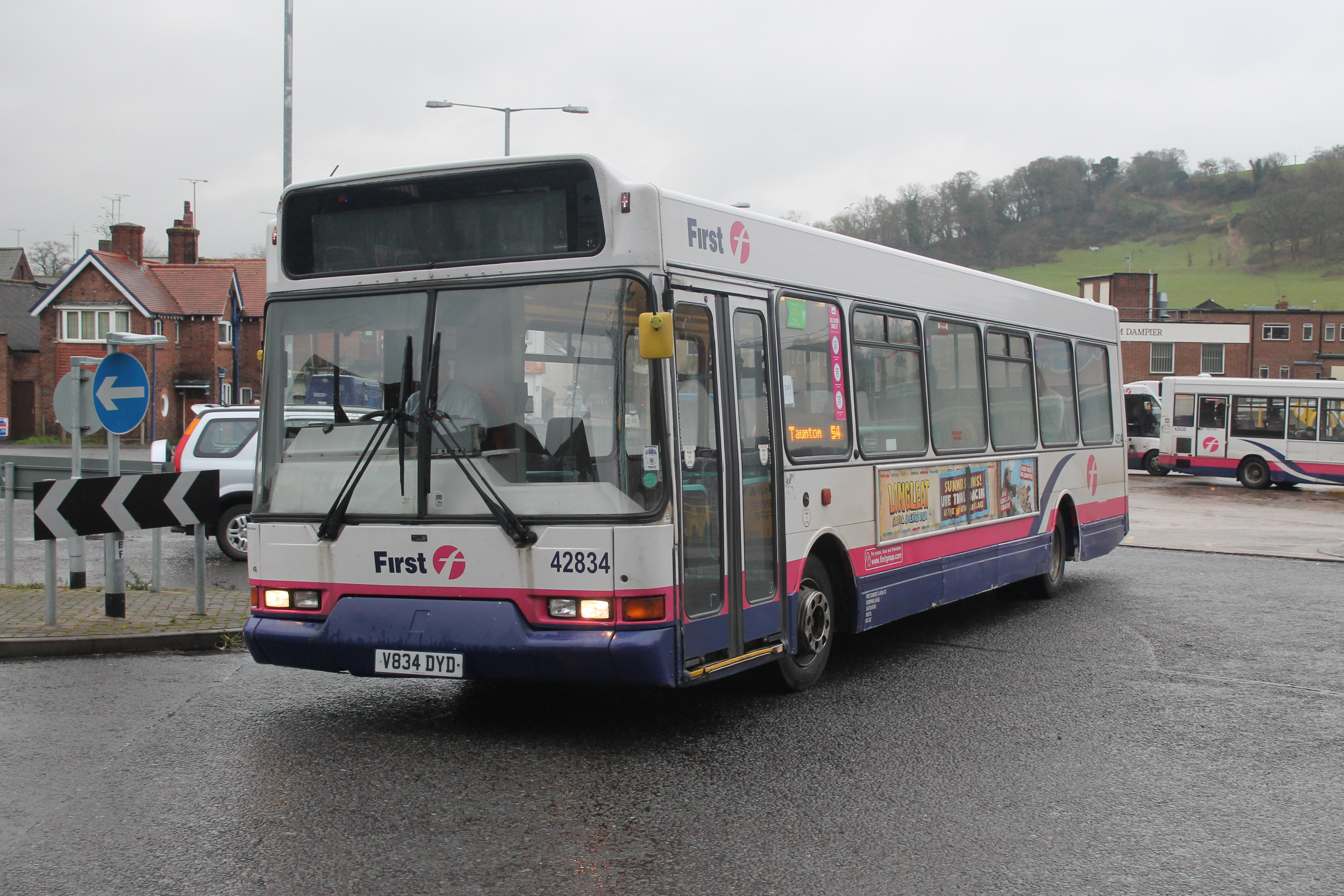
- First Somerset & Avon East Lancs Spryte bodied Dennis Dart SLF in Yeovil in February 2013

Overview
- Manufacturer: East Lancashire Coachbuilders
- Production: 1996 - 2001
- Assembly: Blackburn, Lancashire, England
- Designer: John Worker

Body and chassis
- Doors: 1 or 2
- Floor type: Low floor
- Chassis: Dennis Dart SLF; Volvo B6LE; Volvo B6BLE

Powertrain
- Capacity: 29 to 47 seated

Dimensions
- Length: 9,500–11,470 millimetres (374–452 in)
- Width: 2,475 millimetres (97.4 in)
- Height: 2,750 millimetres (108 in)

Chronology
- Predecessor: East Lancs EL2000
- Successor: East Lancs Myllennium

The East Lancs Spryte was a low floor single-decker bus body built by East Lancashire Coachbuilders primarily for construction on the Dennis Dart SLF chassis.

== Design ==
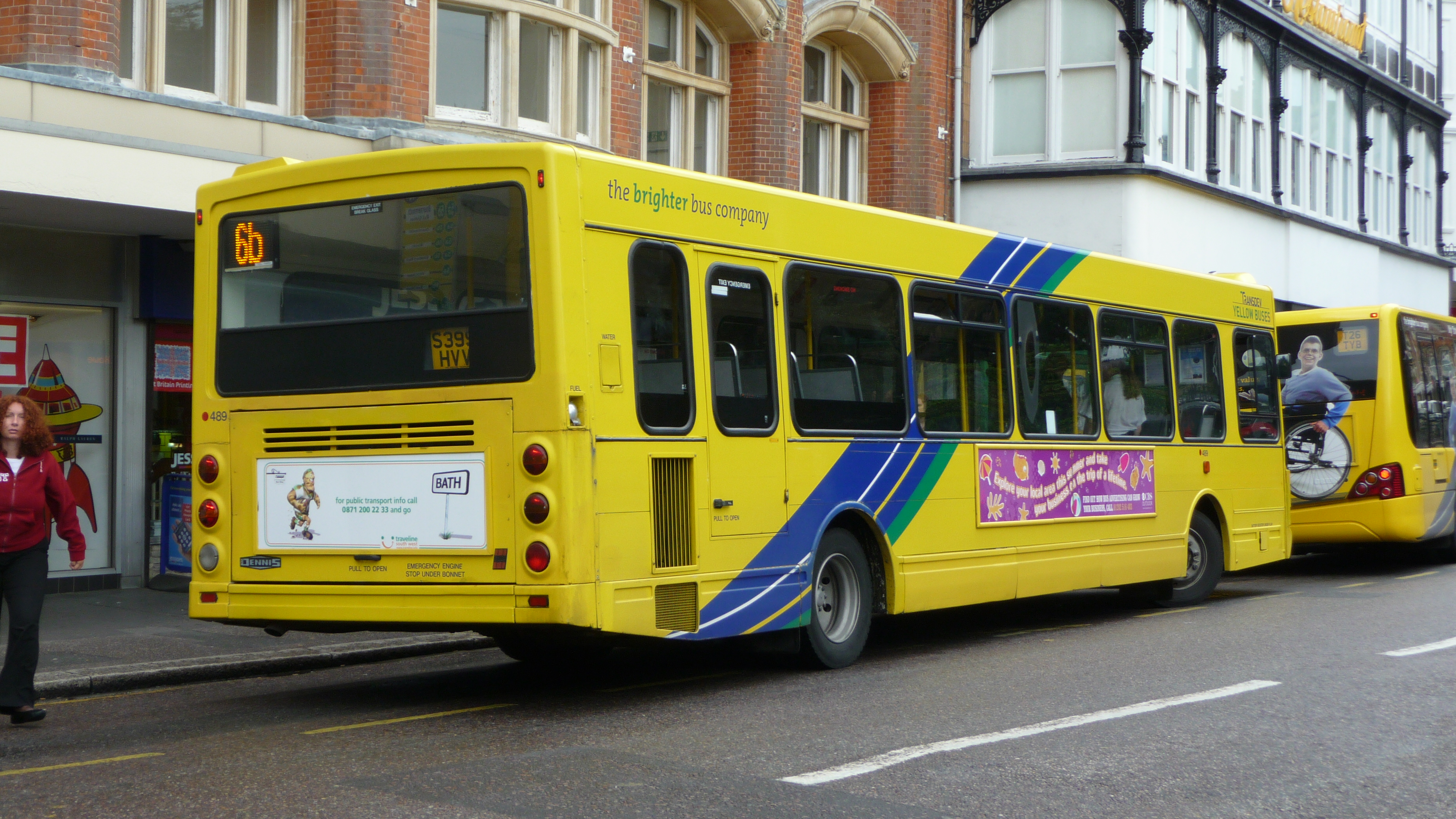
Rear of a Yellow Buses East Lancs Spryte bodied Dennis Dart SLF in Bournemouth in July 2009

The Spryte was the first East Lancs body to be constructed using the Alusuisse bolted aluminium frame system, a system already being used on Wright buses at the time. Designed by in-house designer John Worker, the Spryte body has a double-curvature windscreen, a rounded front bumper which rose in the middle, and notably featured an arched top with a rounded roof dome housing the destination display. Design aspects and the Alusuisse framework system used in the Spryte were reused for East Lancs' Vyking double-decker bus, which was launched in 2000.

=== Flyte ===
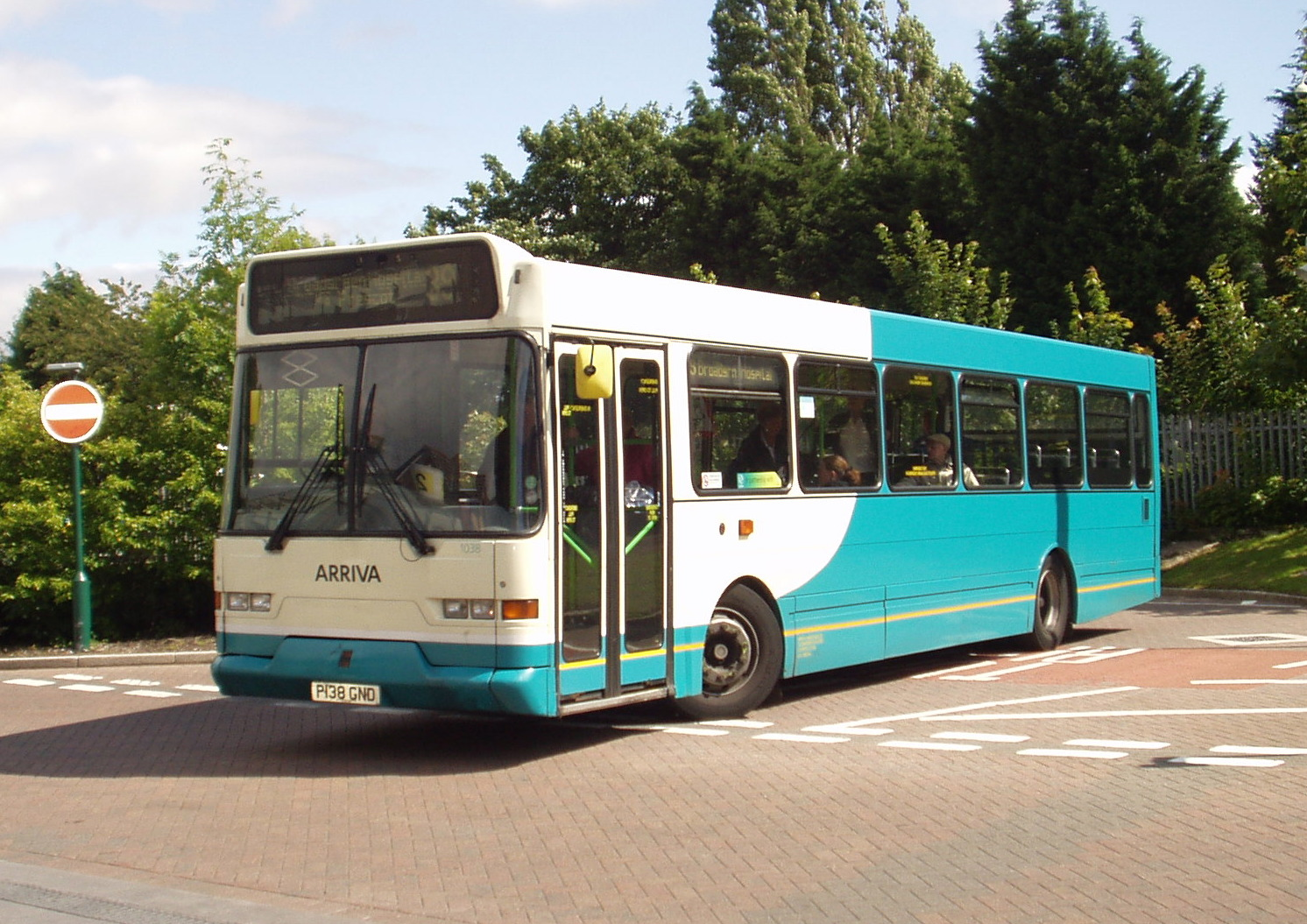
Arriva North West East Lancs Flyte bodied Scania L113CRL in Huyton in July 2007

The Flyte was introduced later in 1996 as a step-entrance counterpart to the Spryte as a replacement for the versatile East Lancs EL2000. It was essentially a development of the Opus 2 design, which had appeared earlier the same year for bodying on the low-floor Spartan TX chassis, sharing the Spryte's front end, Alusuisse body frame and side profiling, although the first two production Sprytes delivered to Delaine Buses on Volvo B10M chassis were uniquely equipped with Opus 2 front ends.

Deliveries were made on Scania L113CRL, Volvo B10M, and uniquely the KIRN Mogul chassis for Yorkshire Traction, while a large proportion of the Flyte's orders were for the rebodying of older chassis, carried out on Leyland Tiger, Scania K112CRB, Scania K113CRB, Volvo B6 and pre-existing Volvo B10M chassis. In the severely dwindling market for step-entrance rebodies, the Flyte was superseded by the Hyline, itself based on a low-floor East Lancs design, in 2000.

== Operators ==
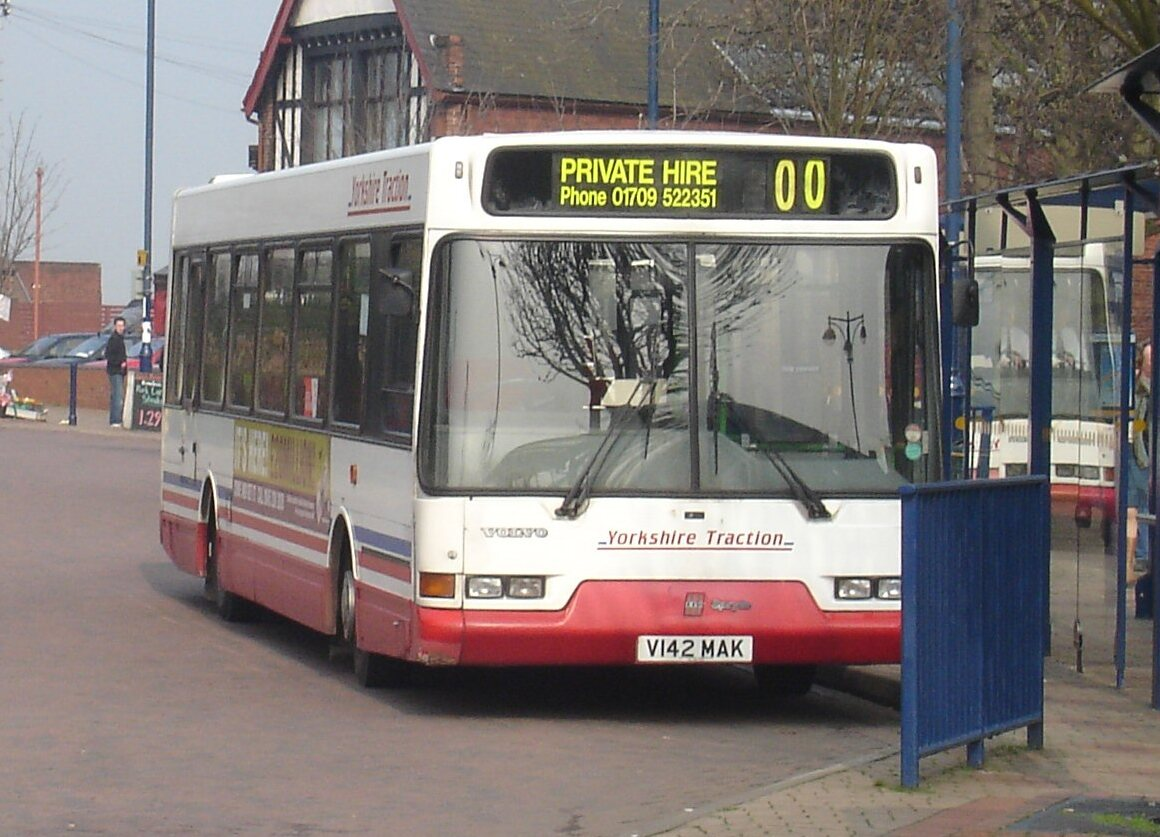
Yorkshire Traction East Lancs Spryte bodied Volvo B6BLE in Wath upon Dearne in April 2005

Rossendale Transport took delivery of the first five East Lancs Sprytes produced in July 1996, using them on a service in Bury tendered to the operator by the Greater Manchester Passenger Transport Executive. British Bus subsidiary London & Country followed with the delivery of 31 Sprytes for use on its Guildford & West Surrey network that same month, while fellow group operators Midland Red North took delivery of seven and Luton & District took delivery of four between September and October 1996.

The Traction Group took delivery of its first Sprytes in September 1997, with lead operator Yorkshire Traction and subsidiary Yorkshire Terrier respectively taking delivery of both a new Spryte on Dennis Dart SLF chassis and a former East Lancs demonstrator for services in Barnsley, with Traction Group companies Strathtay Scottish and Lincolnshire RoadCar following for services in Dundee and Skegness respectively.

Capital Citybus were the only operator of London Regional Transport tendered services to take delivery of Sprytes on Dart SLF chassis, with eight being delivered in early 1998 for use on route S2 between Clapton and Stratford, while First Greater Glasgow also took delivery of eight Spryte bodied Darts in early 1997. Smaller operators of Spryte bodied Dart SLFs included Express Travel of Speke, first taking eight in July 1997 followed by an additional four between 1998 and 1999, contract operator Dunn-Line of Nottingham, first taking delivery of three in 1996 before taking an additional two in 2001, London Stansted Airport shuttle operator Meteor Parking, taking delivery of six dual-door Sprytes for car park shuttle services during 1997, and Folkstone independent Town & Around, taking delivery of a single Spryte in May 1997.

Though the Spryte was initially designed for bodying on the Dennis Dart SLF chassis, some later models were also produced on Volvo's B6LE and B6BLE chassis. Yorkshire Traction were the largest operator of Sprytes built on these chassis, taking delivery of a total 25 produced on both the B6LE and B6BLE chassis between 1999 and 2000. Fifteen Spryte bodied B6BLEs were also supplied in 1999 to London Traveller, an independent partially owned by Yorkshire Traction, for use on route 187.

=== Exports ===
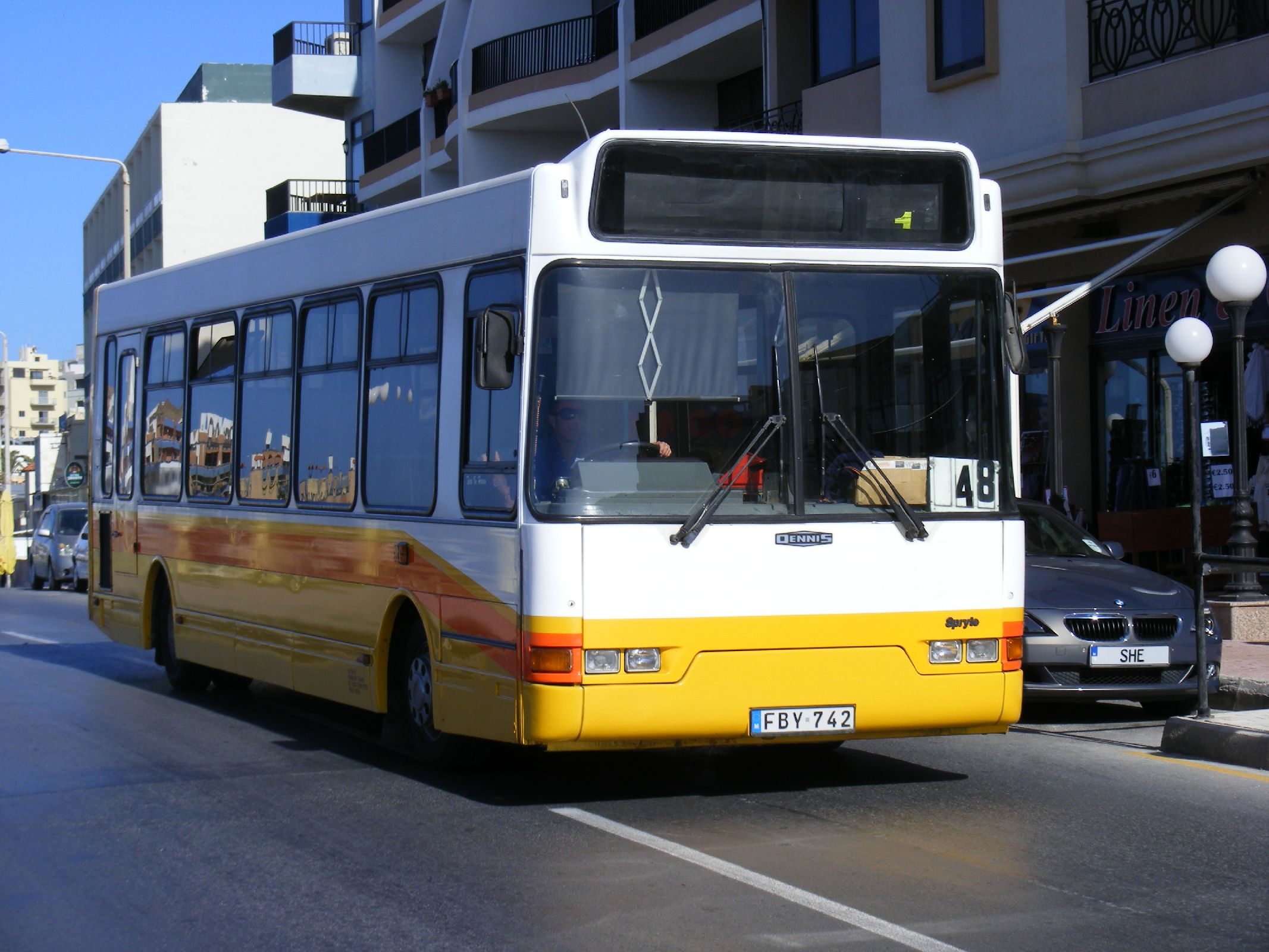
East Lancs Spryte bodied Dennis Dart SLF in Malta in March 2010

Two 10.6 metres (35 ft) East Lancs Spryte bodied Dennis Dart SLFs, equipped with large hopper windows and electronically-operated sun visors, were delivered to Paramount Garage of Malta in 1997. These were also notable for being two of only four manual transmission Dennis Darts ever produced, featuring Eaton six-speed manual transmissions.

== See also ==
- List of buses
