= East Lancs EL2000 =

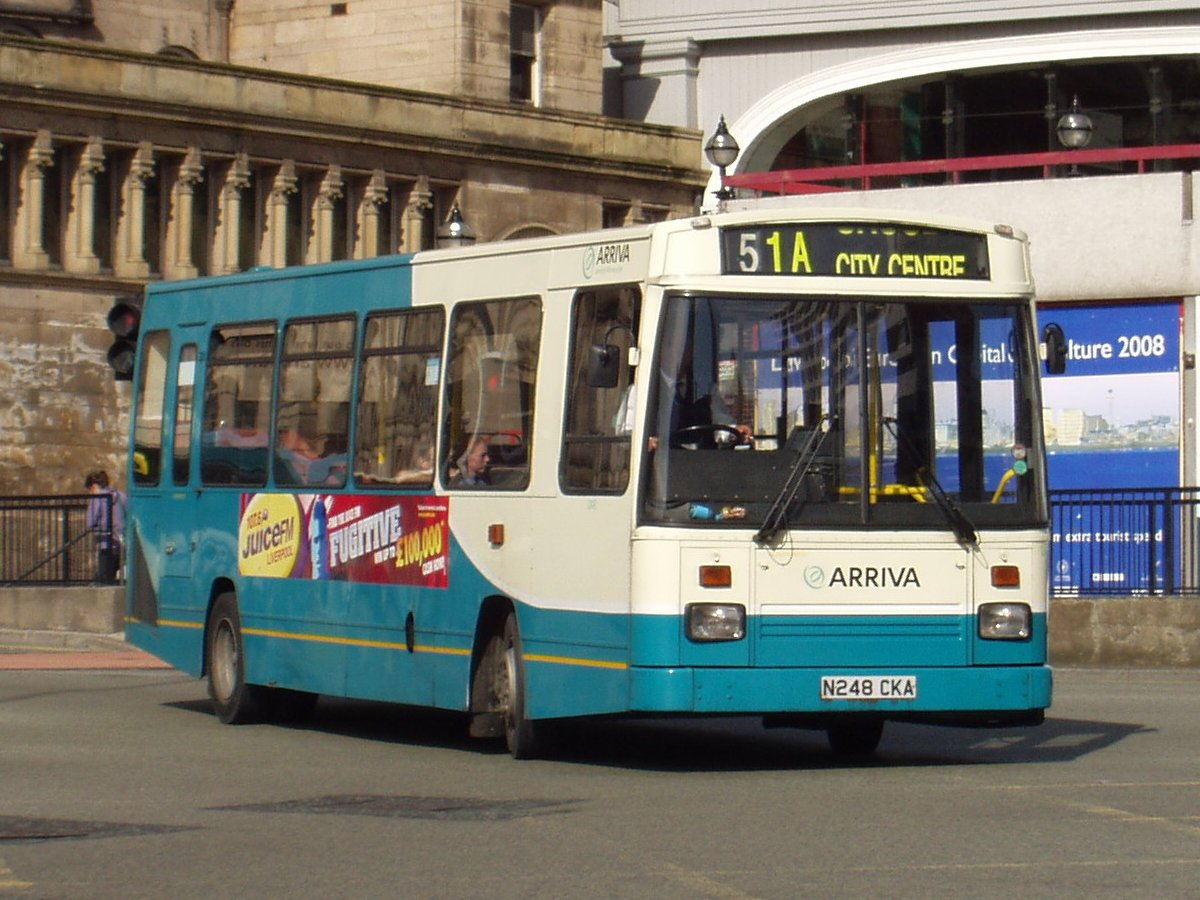
- East Lancs EL2000 body on Dennis Dart with a double-curvature windscreen.

Overview
- Manufacturer: East Lancashire Coachbuilders
- Production: 1989-2001

Body and chassis
- Doors: 1
- Floor type: Step entrance

Powertrain
- Capacity: 28 to 40 seated

Dimensions
- Length: 8.5m to 12.0m
- Width: 2.5m
- Height: 3.0m

The East Lancs EL2000 is a type of single-decker bus body built on a wide variety of bus chassis by East Lancashire Coachbuilders.

== Description ==
The EL2000 has an aluminium frame. It has bowed sides and a bowed top half of the rear end, with a high-set rear window.

There was some variability in the height and shape of the side windows, and the style of windscreen. One common design of windscreen was square-cornered, tapered in towards the top and curved around to the sides. Another was a two-piece flat windscreen with radiused outer corners. A third design used was a double-curvature windscreen with an arched top.

Many different chassis types, both new and secondhand, were fitted with EL2000 bodywork. These include:

- Leyland Leopard (rebodies)
- Leyland Tiger (rebodies)
- Volvo B58 (rebodies)
- Volvo B10M (both new and rebodies)
- Volvo B6
- Dennis Falcon
- Dennis Dart
- Dennis Lance
- Scania K93
- Scania N113

== History ==
The EL2000 made its first appearance on rebodied Leyland Tigers at the end of 1989. It was superseded as a step-entrance body by the Flyte, starting in 1996 and stopped production in 2001.

=== Atlantean Sprint ===
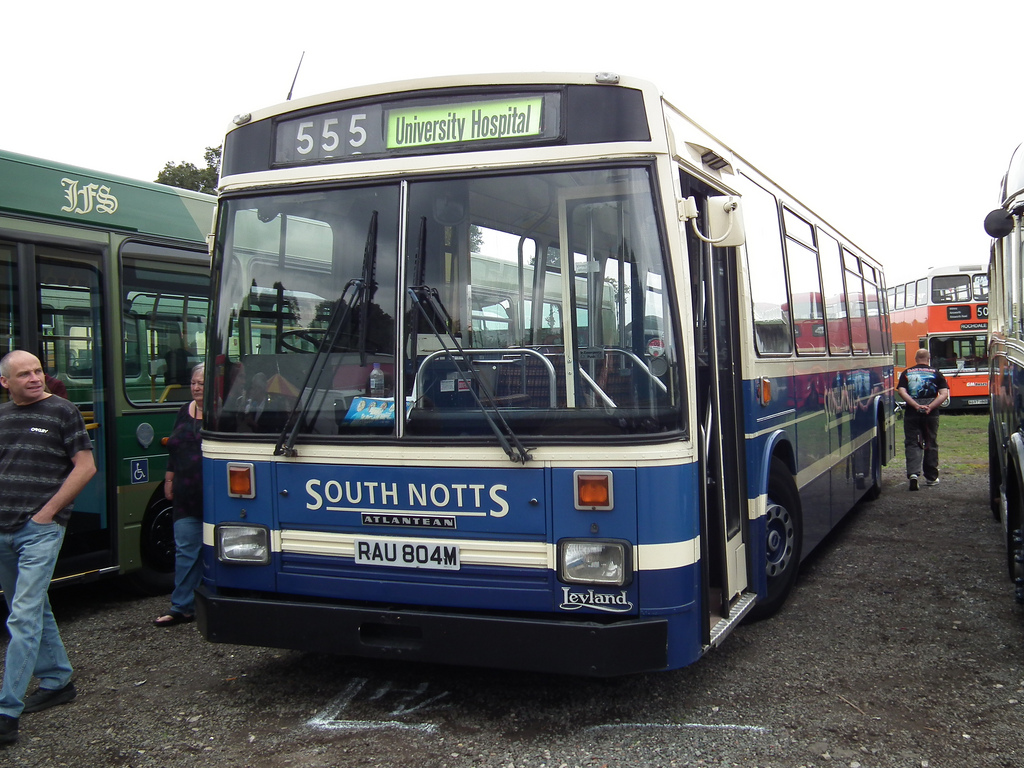
An East Lancs EL2000-bodied Leyland Atlantean preserved in the livery of the South Notts Bus Company in 2011

East Lancs first rebodied an accident-damaged Leyland Atlantean with an EL2000 body for Sheffield Omnibus in 1992, with the conversion aimed at increasing its service life. The Atlantean was stripped of its double-deck body and had its chassis lengthened to 36 ft (11 m), receiving a new 10-leaf front and rear suspension, a new five-speed transmission and an AN68 Atlantean coach engine as well as its 47-seat single-deck body. Further rebodies and refurbishments were marketed as the 'Atlantean Sprint', with Southampton Citybus making orders for ten of its Atlanteans to be rebodied; only five of these rebodies were completed for Southampton.

== See also ==
- Northern Counties Paladin, a similarly versatile single-deck body built on many chassis, including the Leyland Atlantean, by Northern Counties
- List of buses
