= London Traveller =

Bus operator in London

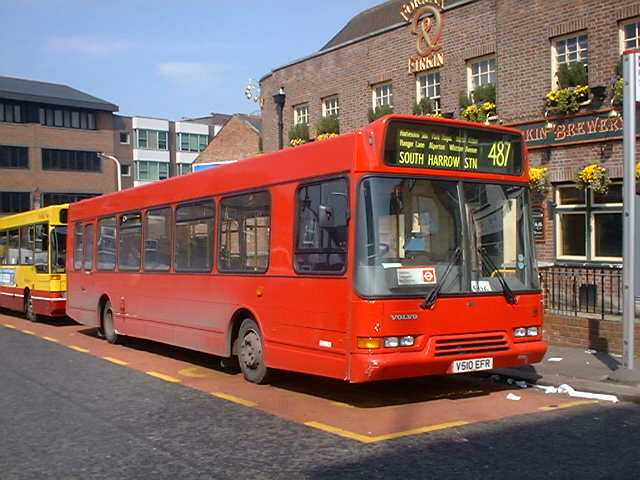
- East Lancs Spryte bodied Volvo B6BLE on route 487 in South Harrow in November 1999
- Founded: 1998
- Ceased operation: 2001
- Headquarters: Harlesden
- Service area: London; Hertfordshire
- Service type: Bus operator
- Chief executive: Dave Booker

London Traveller was a bus operator in London in the late 1990s and early 2000s. It was partially owned by Yorkshire Traction, and was sold to Thorpes in October 2001.

== History ==
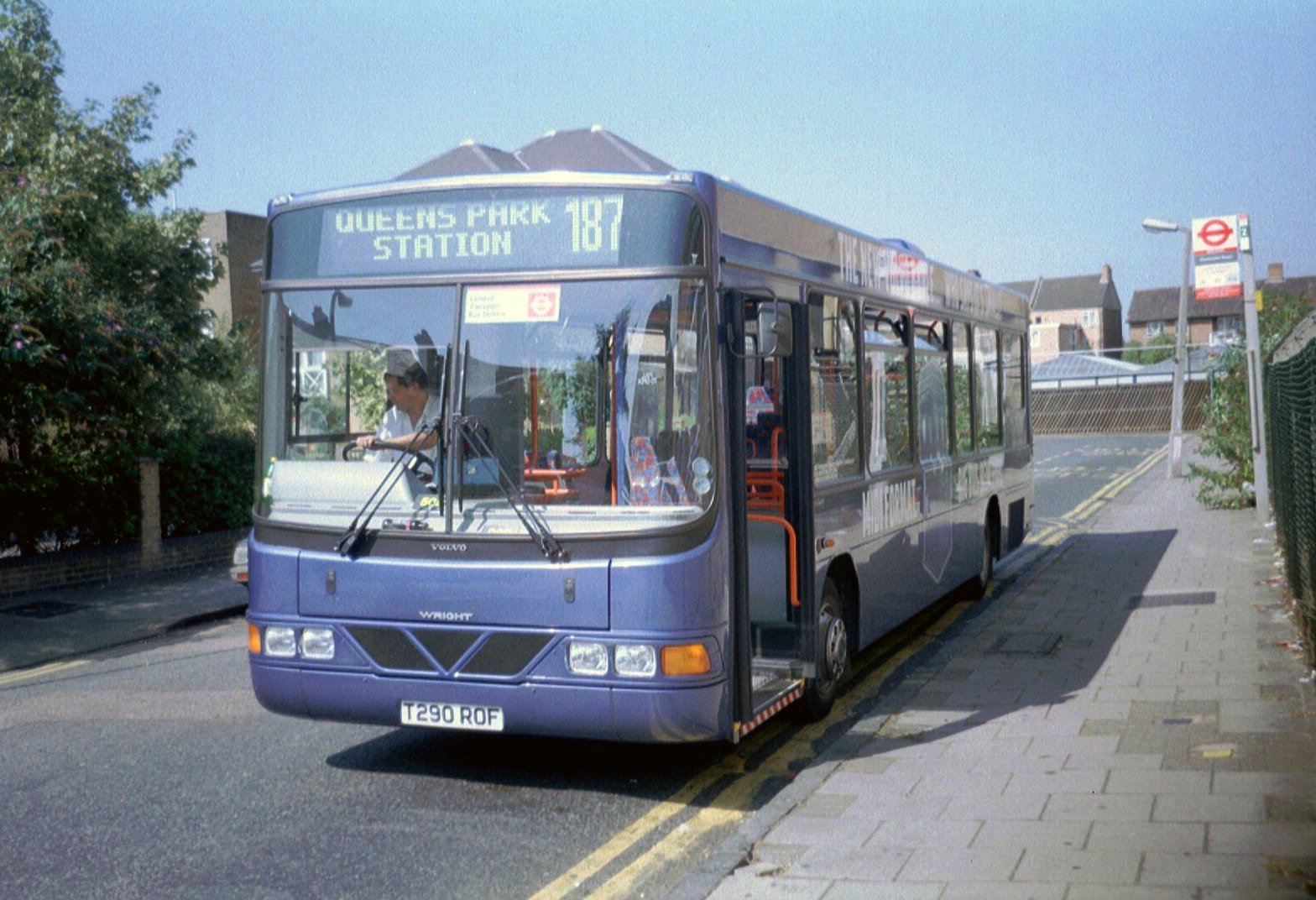
Demonstrator Wright Crusader bodied Volvo B6BLE on route 187 in September 1999

London Traveller was formed in 1998 and initially operated local routes in Hertfordshire from a base in Potters Bar. Its Managing Director was Steve Deveraux, who had experience in the London market through his former involvement with the short-lived London Forest operation. A small number of contracted school bus workings on London routes 143 and 302 were gained in June 1998, and operated with second-hand double-deckers.

The company's biggest expansion came in May 1999, when the contract for routes 187 and 487 were won from Metroline. Fifteen new Volvo B6BLEs were purchased to operate the routes. Following this success, Yorkshire Traction bought a 25% stake in the company. The Hertfordshire routes were registered to a separate company, so were expected not to be involved in the deal, but were ultimately integrated into the London Traveller business. In mid-2000 Deveraux left the company, and his successor Dave Booker immediately cancelled the two remaining off-peak commercial services in Hertfordshire. Route 187 was extended to operate to Finchley Road in early 2000, and five more B6BLEs were acquired.

Management problems at London Traveller in 2000 saw the company reformed, with Metropolitan Omnibus becoming a trading name for the first time. Traction's share in the company increased to 35% as a result. In October 2001, the company was sold to Thorpes.

== Subsequent history ==
Thorpes acquired all of Traveller's routes and vehicles, although the Volvo B6BLEs were later sold back to Traction and used in the Yorkshire Traction and Yorkshire Terrier fleets. They were included in the 2006 sale of Traction to Stagecoach Yorkshire.

== Fleet ==
London Traveller used Volvo B6BLEs on routes 187 and 487, initially buying 15 and later acquiring a further five following a route extension. Another similar bus was delivered as a spare in 2001, taking the total to 21, the number acquired by Thorpes. These were joined on the routes by a unique MAN NL222 single-decker for a short period. Traveller's other routes used double-deckers such as MCW Metrobuses, Leyland Olympians and a Dennis Arrow. A Leyland National was also owned, as was a Leyland Leopard and a Leyland Lynx.
