= Scania L113 =

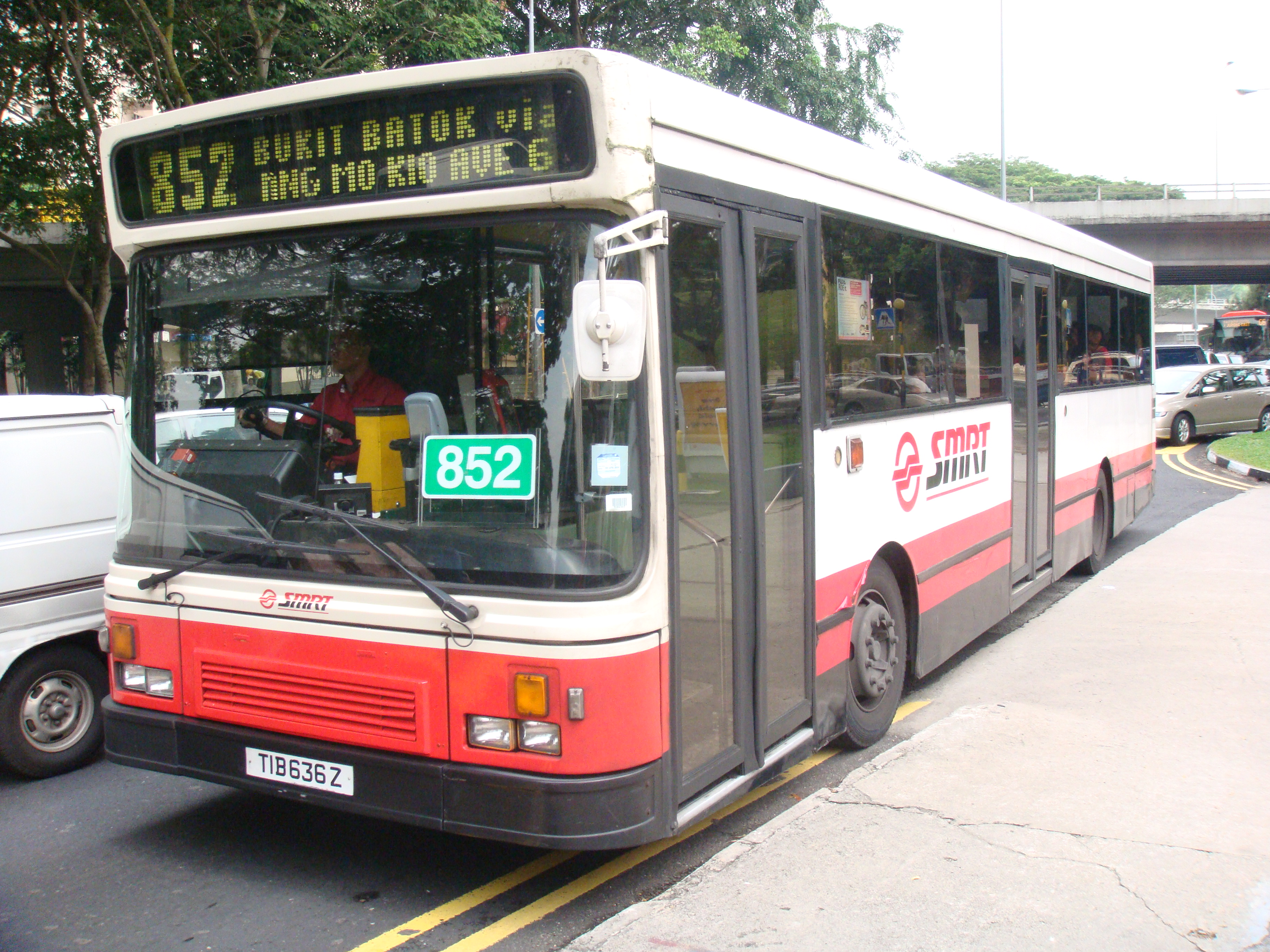
- SMRT Buses Alexander Strider bodied L113CRL in Singapore

Overview
- Manufacturer: Scania
- Production: 1989-1998

Body and chassis
- Doors: 1-2
- Floor type: Step entrance or Low entry

Powertrain
- Engine: Scania DS11; Scania DSC11
- Capacity: up to 60 passengers

Dimensions
- Length: 10.7 - 12.3 metres
- Width: 2.52 metres
- Height: 3.00 metres

Chronology
- Successor: Scania L94

The Scania L113 was a step entrance and low entry single-decker bus chassis manufactured by Scania in Sweden between 1989 and 1998. It is a low entry compartment to the low floor N113.

== Design ==
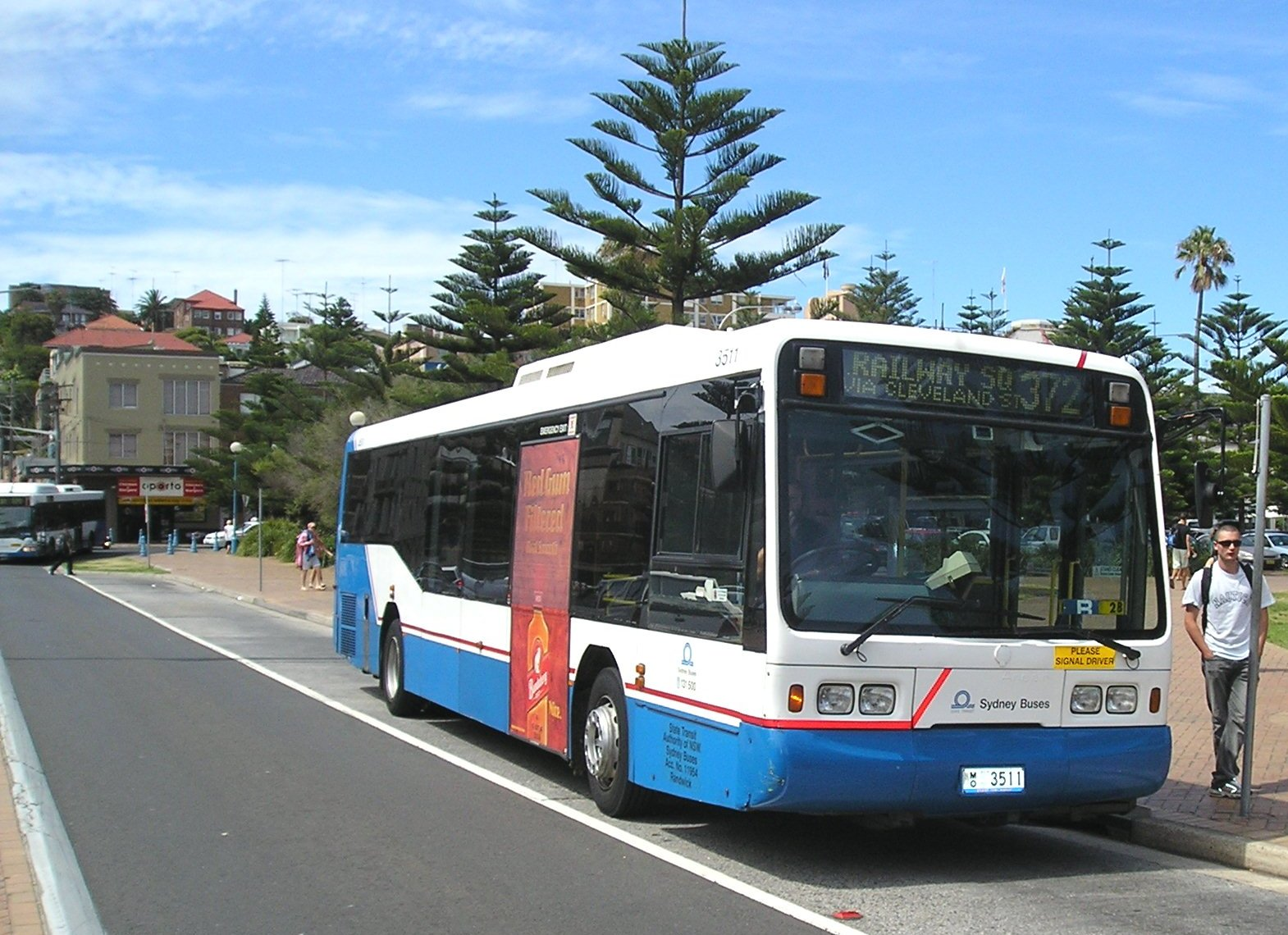
Sydney Buses Ansair bodied L113CRL in Coogee in January 2009

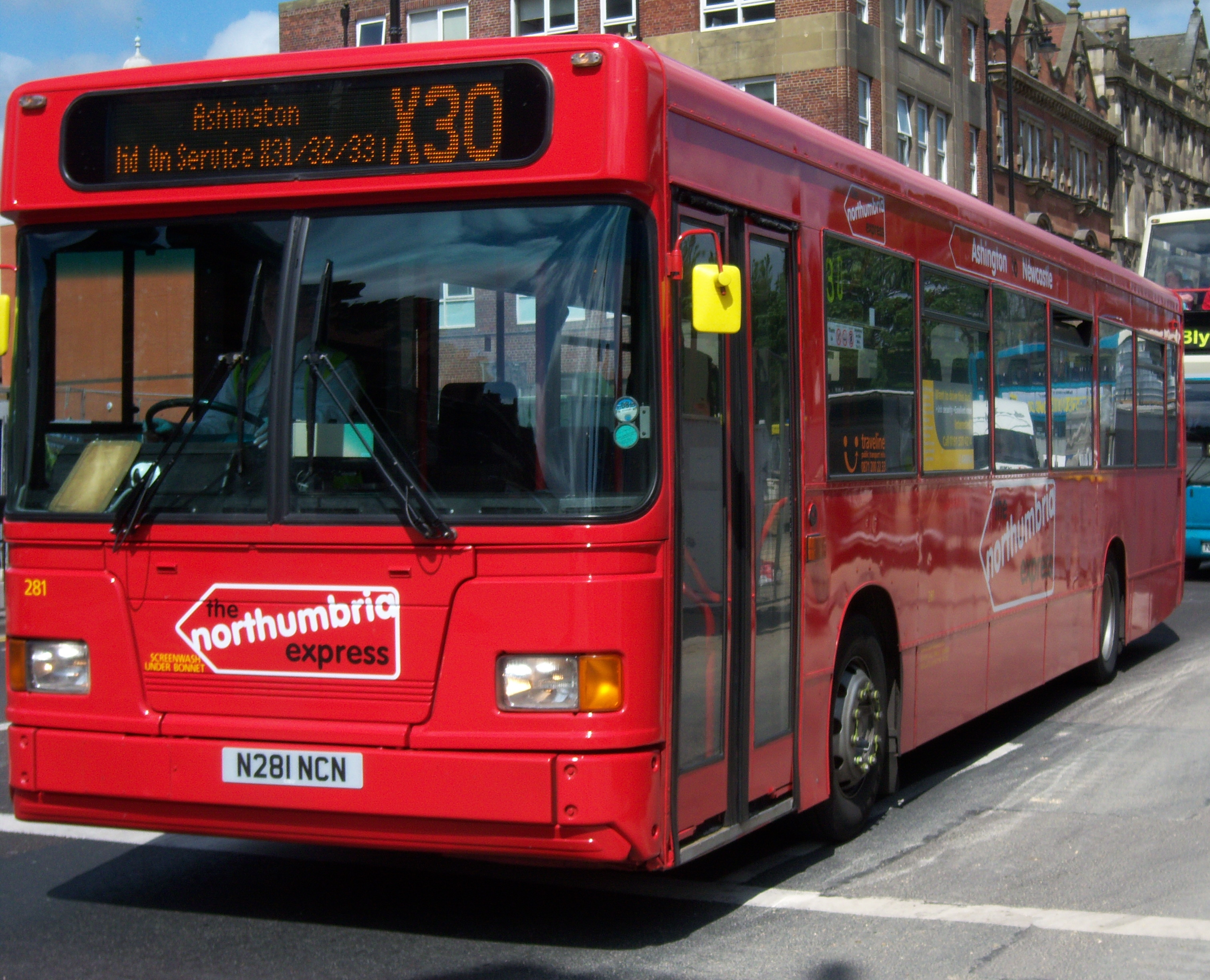
Arriva North East East Lancs European bodied L113 in Newcastle in May 2009

The L113 was largely a cross between the N113 and K113, with the front section of its chassis of a similar height to that of the N113, and an 11-litre engine that was mounted longitudinally as per the K113. However, it differed from both models by having this engine inclined to the side.

== Sales ==
In Scandinavia, the L113 was sold mainly as an interurban bus with bodywork by a range of manufacturers including Carrus and Ajokki of Finland and DAB of Denmark. It was also sold as a city bus in South America.

=== Australia ===
Sydney Buses purchased 102 step entrance L113CRB, 156 low entry L113CRL and 50 14.5 metre step entrance L113TRBs bodied by Ansair between January 1993 and April 1998.

=== Estonia ===
In Estonia, the L113CLB was made bodies by Duple Metsec but build at Baltscan in Estonia, most common body was Duple Metsec T-76 City, others were also available. Only one Duple Metsec T-76 City was preserved as museum example.

=== Portugal ===
In Portugal, the L113 was sold between 1993 and 1998. The most common bodyworks was the Marcopolo Tricana and Irmãos Mota Atomic UR95, but it was also available with Irmãos Mota Atomic UR89 or CAMO Camus bodyworks, all of them as city buses. However, the L113 was also sold as a coach, almost all of them using Irmãos Mota MKIII bodywork, but they could also be seen bodied with CAMO Riviera.

=== Singapore ===
A total of 77 L113 sets were supplied to Singapore – Trans Island Bus Services taking 50 with Scottish built Alexander Strider bodywork sets were between 1995 and 1997 and 15 with Greek built ELVO bodywork sets in 1996, and Singapore Bus Service taking 12 with Soon Chow bodies in 1995. In 2014, thereafter statutory lifespan expiry date are progressively fully retirement of SMRT's Scania L113CRL buses were taken out of service and sent for scrap than officially de-registered. and as the direct replacement newer generation Wheelchair Accessible Bus (WAB) batch of MAN NL323F A22 Lion's City Hybrid buses. they were powered by a Scania DSC1171 engine (11,021cc) that is Euro I compliant and some 4-speed ZF Ecomat 4HP 500 gearbox.

=== United Kingdom ===
The L113 was introduced to the United Kingdom in 1994, with 511 delivered.

Early examples had step-entrance Northern Counties Paladin and Alexander Strider bodies, while East Lancs offered the European and later the Flyte.

However, the L113 sold best with the low-entry Wright Axcess-Ultralow with 330 such vehicles built, the majority for FirstGroup subsidiaries.

== Replacement ==
In 1997, Scania introduced its 4-series range of buses, which utilised smaller and cleaner engines in order to comply with Euro2 emission limits. The L113 was thus replaced by the 9-litre engined L94.
