= Thorpes =

British bus operating company

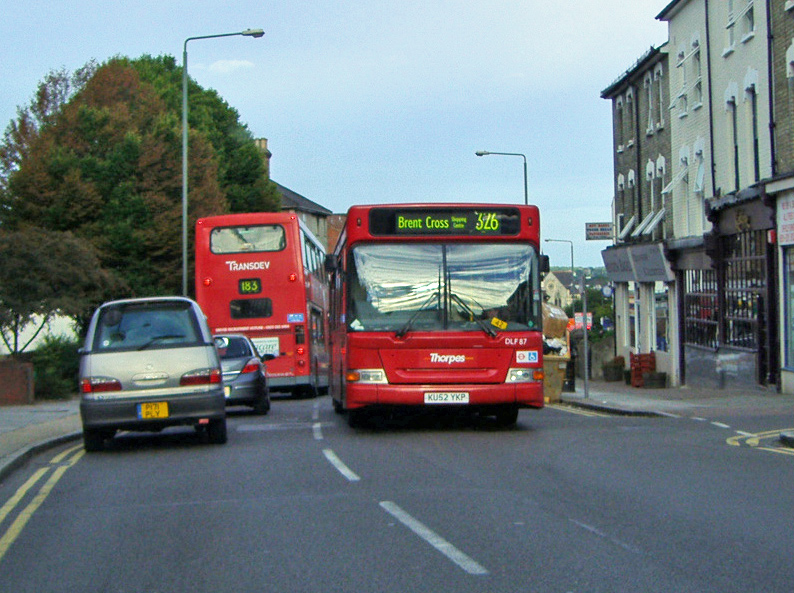
- Plaxton Pointer-bodied Dennis Dart SLF on route 326 in Hendon in 2006
- Parent: ComfortDelGro
- Ceased operation: January 2007
- Service area: London
- Depots: 2
- Fleet: 66 (August 2004)

Thorpes was an English bus operator. It operated services under contract to Transport for London.

== History ==
Thorpes was a coach operator that diversified into operating bus services under contract to Transport for London in the 1990s. Their Stationlink routes connected London termini using disabled access vehicles, terminating in Paddington. They also started operating mobility routes.

In October 2001 it purchased the business of London Traveller.

In August 2004, the business was purchased by ComfortDelGro. In January 2007, ComfortDelGro integrated Thorpes into its Metroline subsidiary.

Routes operated included 70, 143, 187, 210, 316, 326, 487, 626, 705, 981, C11, H12 (school journeys), and SL2.
