= Yorkshire Traction =

Bus operator in South Yorkshire, England

Yorkshire Traction Company Ltd

- Yorkshire Traction Leyland Olympian outside Rawmarsh bus depot in June 2005
- Founded: March 1902
- Defunct: 14 December 2005
- Headquarters: Barnsley
- Service area: South Yorkshire; West Yorkshire
- Service type: Bus and coach
- Hubs: Barnsley; Doncaster; Huddersfield; Rotherham
- Depots: 6
- Fuel type: Diesel

Yorkshire Traction was a bus operator in South and West Yorkshire with subsidiaries in other areas that operated from 1902 until 2005.

== History ==
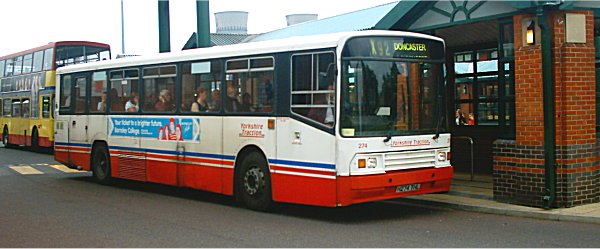
Yorkshire Traction Alexander PS bodied Scania N113 at Meadowhall Interchange in 2005

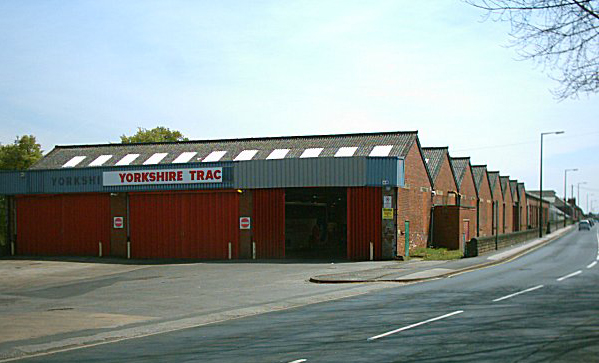
Yorkshire Traction bus depot and HQ at Upper Sheffield Road, Barnsley in May 2006

In March 1902 the Barnsley & District Electric Traction Company Limited was formed. It operated trams around the Barnsley area until around 1930. In 1928, prior to the trams being withdrawn, the company was renamed from the Barnsley & District Traction Company Limited (the 'electric' part of the name being dropped some years earlier).

In October 1968, Yorkshire Traction, by then part of the Transport Holding Company, absorbed fellow subsidiaries Mexborough & Swinton Traction Company and County Motors.

As part of the privatisation of the National Bus Company, Yorkshire Traction was sold in January 1987 to a management buyout. The business subsequently expanded through purchasing other operators including:

- Ridings Travel
- Barnsley & District formed in July 1990 when Yorkshire Traction bought the bus business of Tom Jowitt Travel and the local bus services of Shearings and Globe Travel
- Lincolnshire RoadCar
- Lincoln City Transport
- Yorkshire Terrier
- Andrews (merged with Yorkshire Terrier in 1998)
- Sheffield Omnibus (merged with Andrews in 1996)
- South Riding (merged with Andrews in 1995)
- Strathtay Scottish in May 1991
- Meffans Coaches (a subsidiary of Strathtay)
- London Traveller 35% shareholding, sold on to Thorpes in October 2001

In December 2005, Yorkshire Traction was sold to the Stagecoach Group, with operations in South Yorkshire subsequently rebranded to Stagecoach Yorkshire. Stagecoach announced the closure of Yorkshire Traction's central depot and works at Upper Sheffield Road in Barnsley for redevelopment in 2006, with buses and engineering eventually moving to an existing depot on Wakefield Road during 2008, resulting in the loss of 47 jobs.

In May 2008, Stagecoach sold its Huddersfield operations to independent operator Centrebus, with the part of the business remaining with Stagecoach retained as part of the Yorkshire subsidiary.

== Operations ==
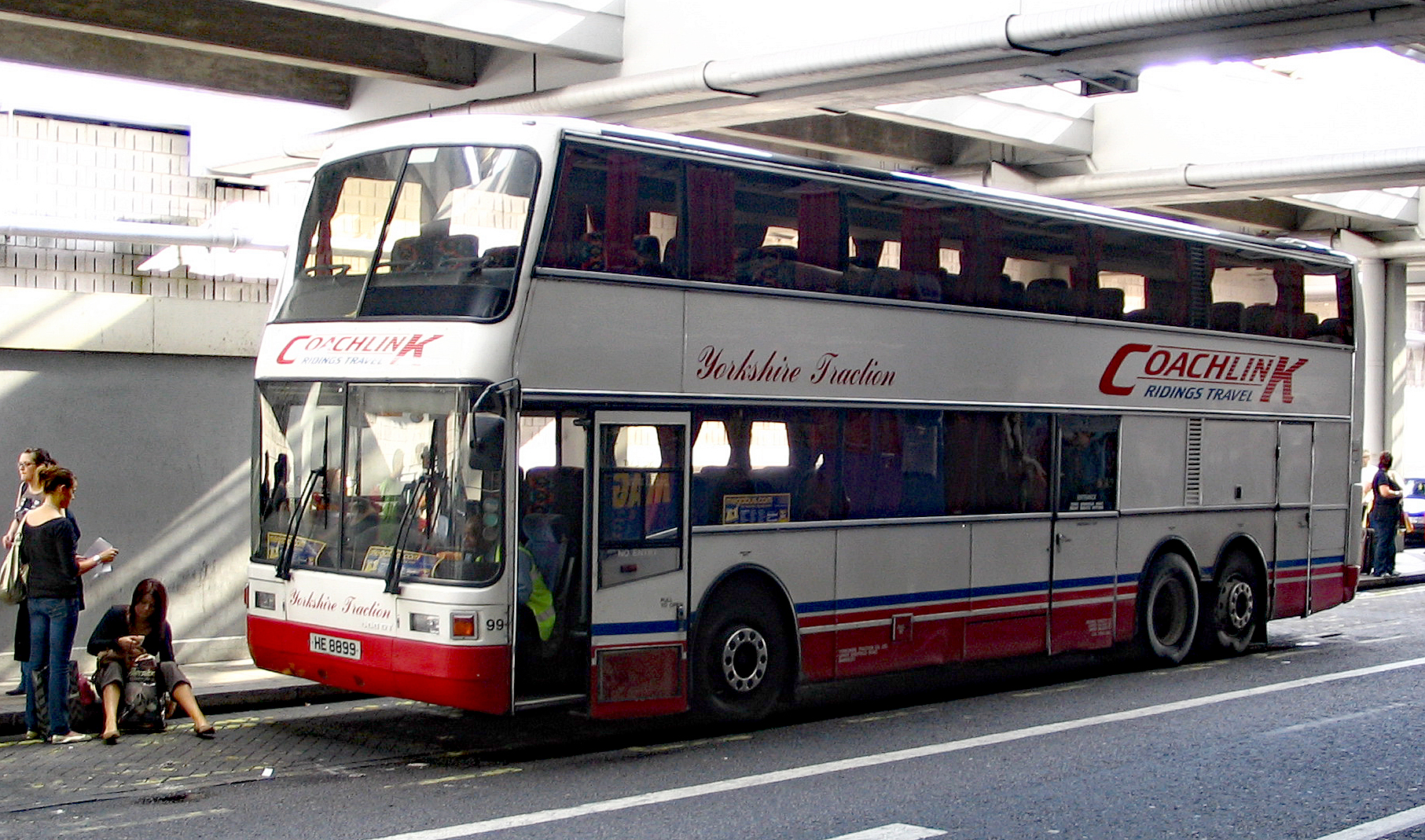
Yorkshire Traction Coachlink MCW Metroliner 400GT coach at Green Line Coach Station

The company operated services across Barnsley, Doncaster, Huddersfield, Rotherham and parts of Sheffield and Wakefield Metropolitan Districts. From the 1974 formation of the South Yorkshire Passenger Transport Executive, which took over the Sheffield, Rotherham and Doncaster municipal bus operations until the mid-1990s, the operating area of South Yorkshire was split between South Yorkshire Passenger Transport Executive and Yorkshire Traction with the former dominating Sheffield and Rotherham. Through the acquisitions of Sheffield Omnibus, South Riding, Andrews and Yorkshire Terrier in the early 1990s, the company gained a significant foothold in Sheffield.

Yorkshire Traction had for decades been a major regional operator of National Express services covering nationwide routes in addition to its regular and long established services in and out of London to Yorkshire towns and cities. It had also operated alongside National Travel, the short break holiday arm of National Bus Company. Upon privatisation, YTC launched "Yorkshire Traction's Coachlink" which became a popular choice for the short break coach holidaymaker within the region. In 1989, neighbouring operator West Riding Automobile Company left the coaching industry and sold the name "Ridings Travel", the order book and the goodwill, but no vehicles, to YTC. They merged this operation into their existing coaching unit and painted several coaches in full Ridings Travel livery.

== See also ==
- List of bus operators of the United Kingdom
