= High-floor =

Type of public transport vehicle

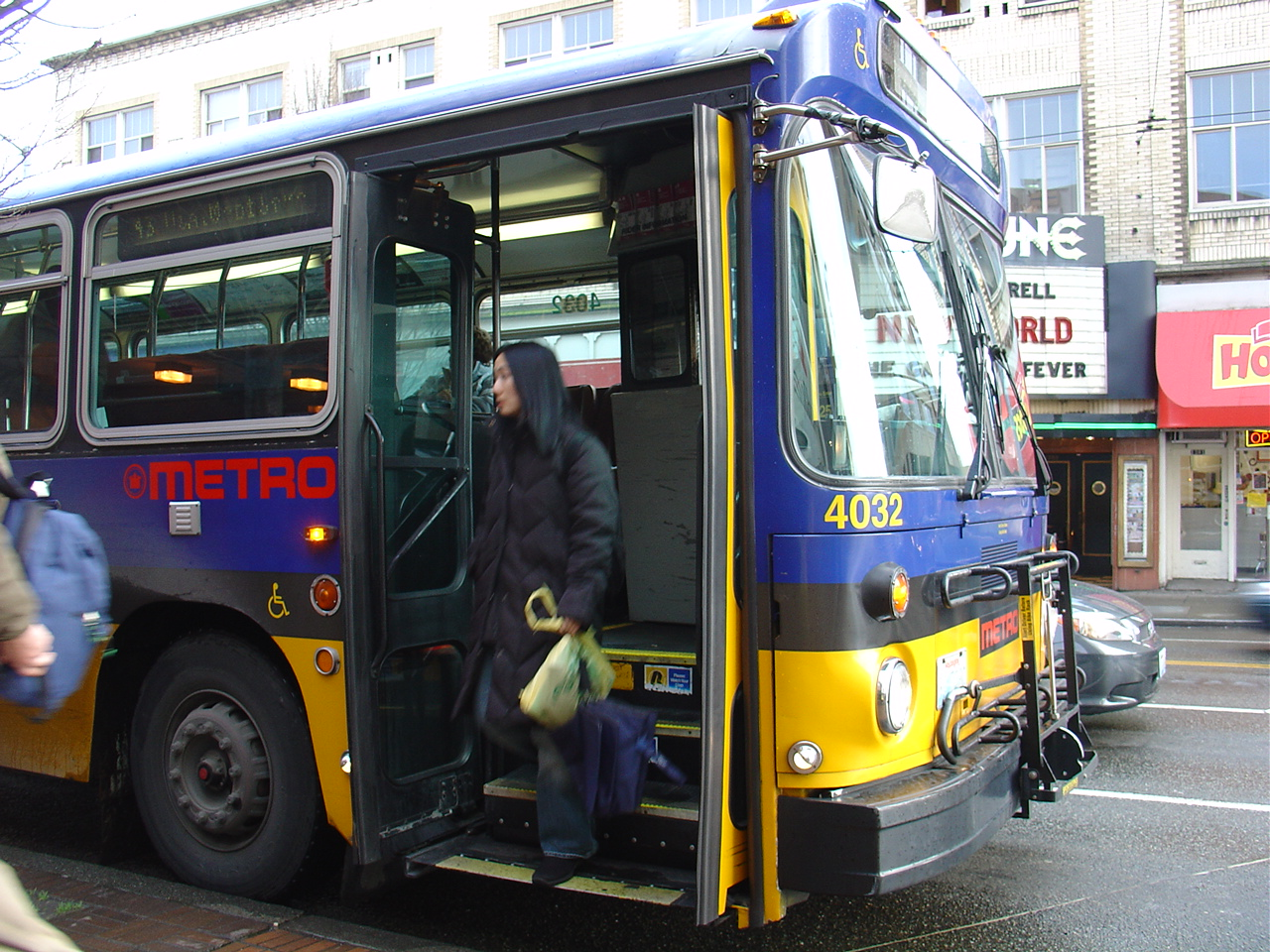
In this high-floor trolleybus, four steps must be negotiated during entry and exit.

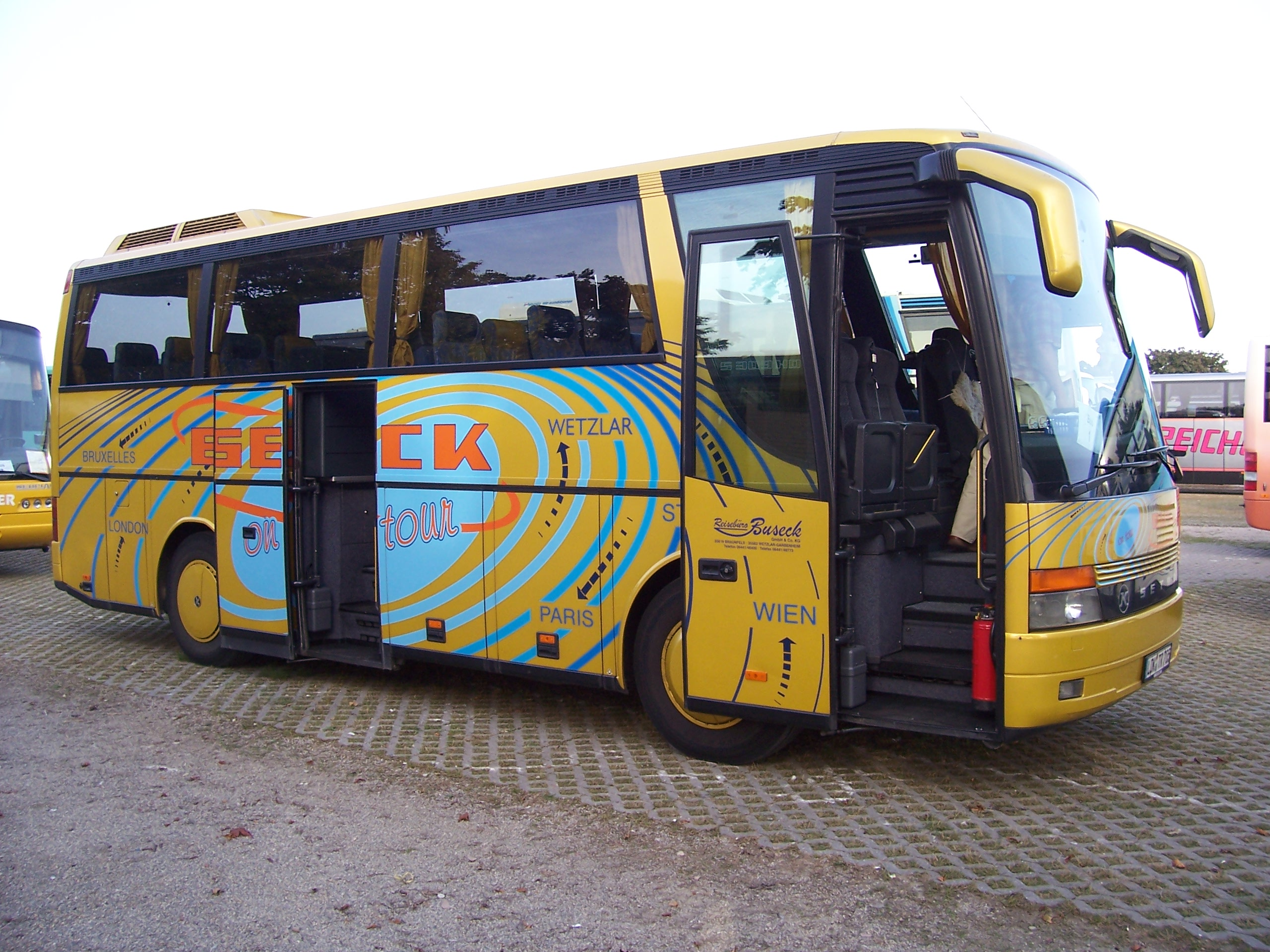
High-floor coach, giving three steps for entry and exit.

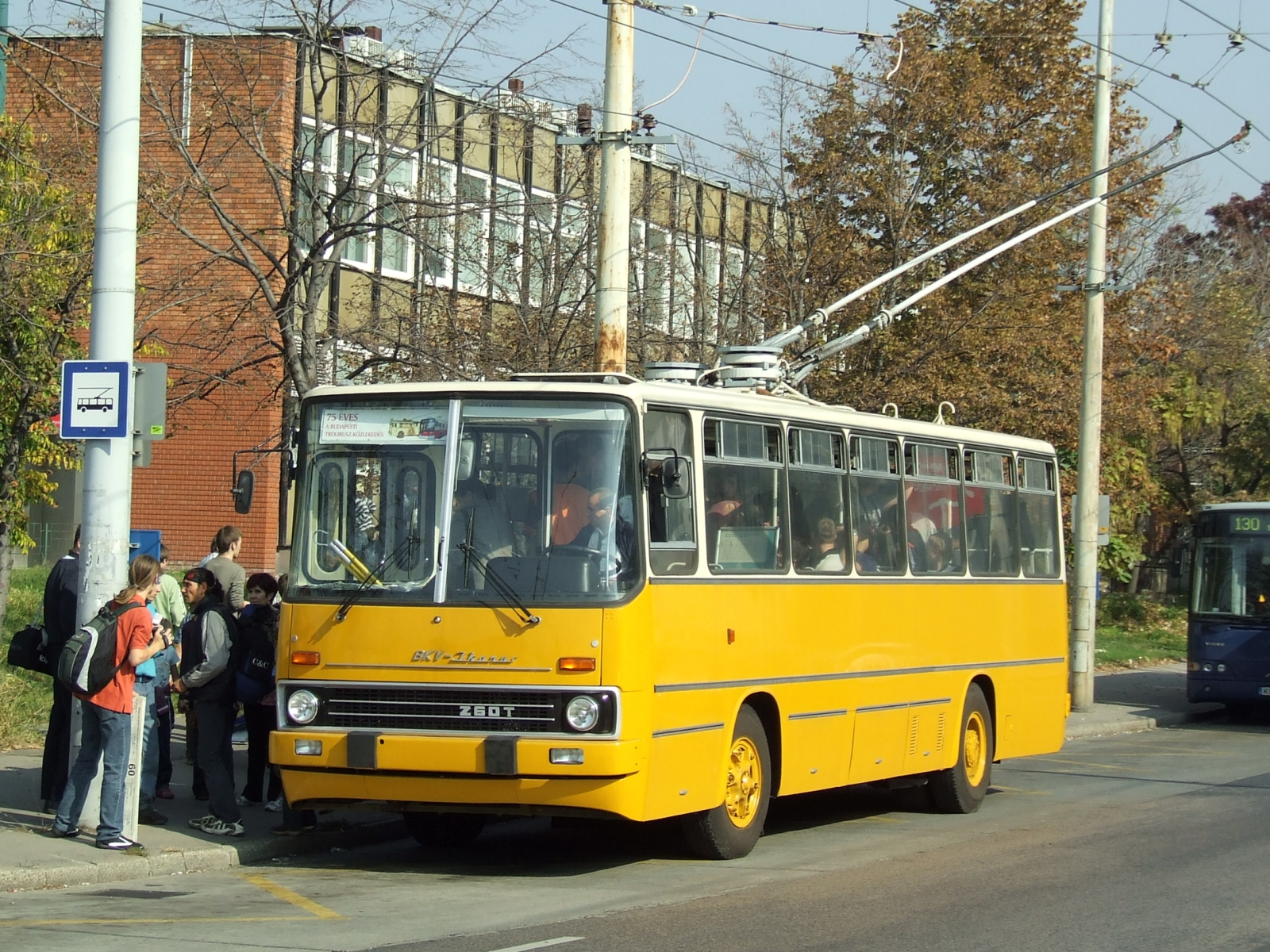
The Ikarus 260T, a High-floor trolleybus on an Ikarus 260 chassis, manufactured by Ikarus Bus

High-floor describes the interior flooring of commuter vehicles primarily used in public transport such as trains, light rail cars and other rail vehicles, along with buses and trolleybuses. Interior floor height is generally measured above the street surface or above the top of the rail. High-floor designs usually result from packaging requirements: mechanical items such as axles, motors, crankshafts, and/or transmissions, or luggage storage spaces are traditionally placed under the interior floor of these vehicles. The term is used in contrast with low-floor designs, which offer a decreased floor and entry height above the street surface. Since low-floor designs generally were developed after high-floor vehicles, the older high-floor design is sometimes also known as conventional or the “traditional” design.

== Rail ==
=== Heavy rail ===
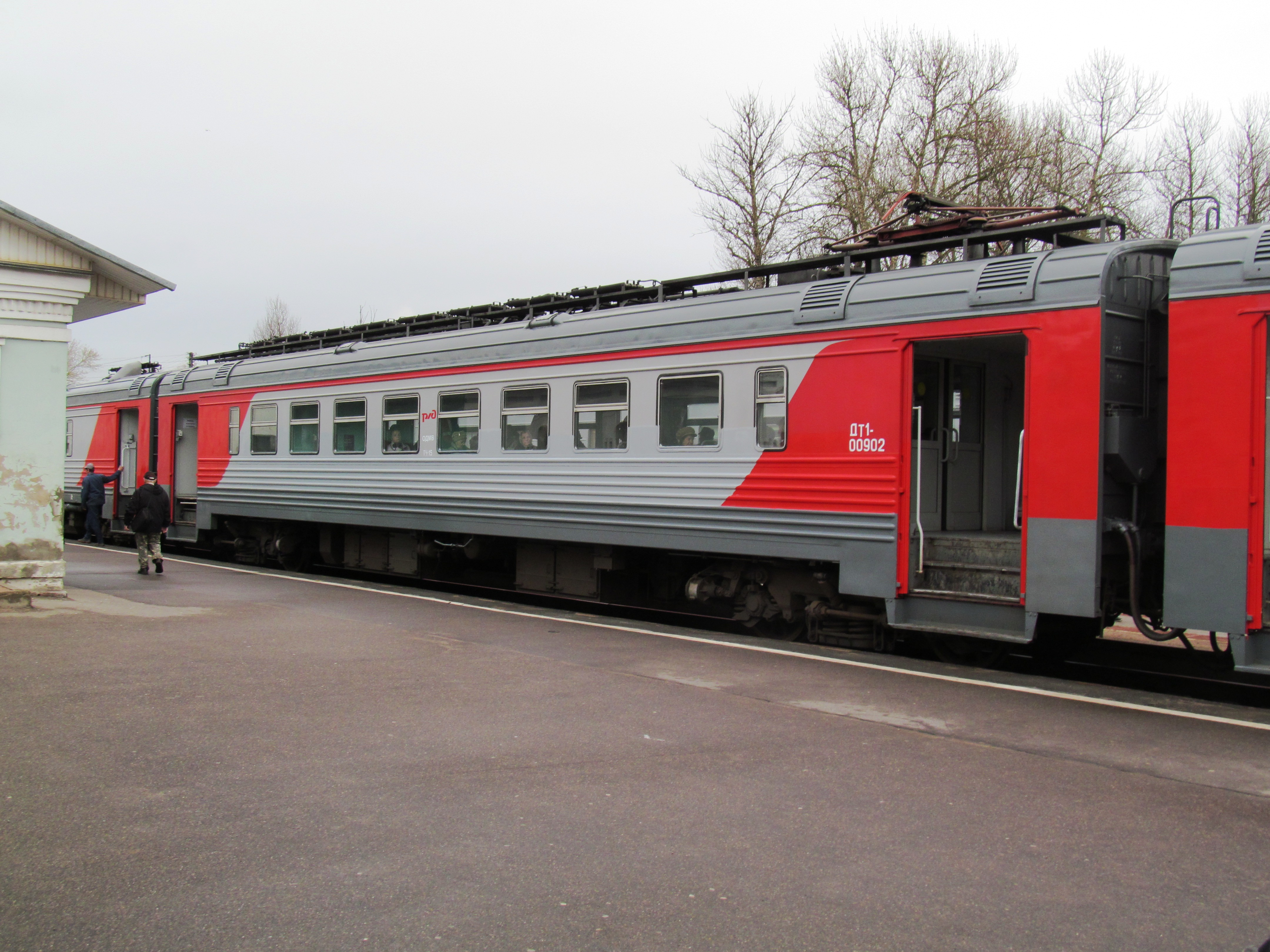
High floor train in Russia

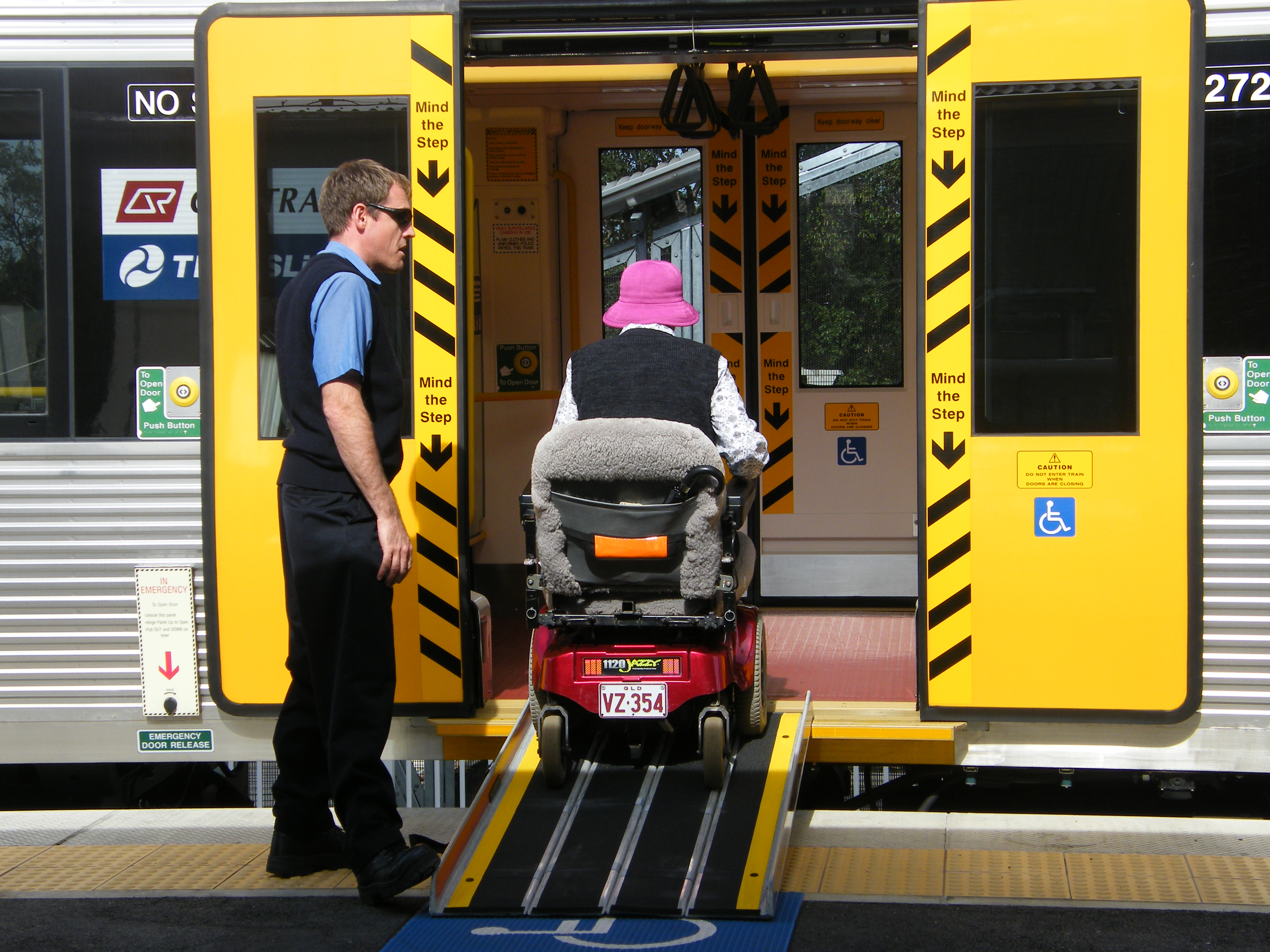
High floor train with ramp in Brisbane

A rail vehicle of conventional or high-floor design usually has a flat floor ranging between 760 and 1,370 mm (30 and 54 in) above the top of the railhead (ATOR). To enhance accessibility and optimize dwell times, railway platform heights at stations are sometimes standardised to allow level boarding for commuters on high platforms. According to one definition, level boarding means the gap between the platform and the floor of the track varies by no more than 76 mm (3 in) horizontally and 16 mm (5/8 in) vertically. Level boarding is also known as stepless entry since passengers do not have to use a staircase to board the passenger car.

For newly constructed routes, routes primarily located in tunnels, or routes with a dedicated right of way and enough space, high platforms are usually preferred, since high-floor vehicles are cheaper to manufacture, and have better operating characteristics. High platforms do have significant advantages beyond level boarding for wheelchair accessibility. Physically disabled passengers (e.g. those using wheelchairs or who have difficulties climbing stairs) also benefit, as do travelers pulling wheeled luggage or small folding shopping carts. Even physically non-disabled passengers can board a railcar more rapidly if they do not have to climb stairs to enter, reducing dwell time at a stop, and reducing overall travel time. In addition, high-platform railcars have more floor space for passengers if space is not required for stairways, and wheelwells needed to accommodate train bogies.

Because bilevel rail cars have two passenger levels within a standard height rail car, the lower level, where passengers board, is generally lower than a conventional high-floor car. Hence level boarding with a bilevel car is accomplished using a lower platform, as low as 460 mm (18 in) ATOR.

=== Light rail ===
Because tram/light-rail/streetcar vehicles often share loading gauge sizes with heavy rail vehicles, these passenger vehicles usually also use high floor designs. Existing tram/streetcar/light-rail networks generally feature low platforms as many of the stations or stops are in the streets. The high construction/conversion cost of high platforms and the difficulty of making high platforms compatible with other features of the urban landscape are a significant obstacle to converting tram networks these into urban or commuter rail networks with high platforms.

These problems were a major motivation for the development of low-floor trams, which allow transit operators to avoid the retrofitting of high platforms on existing routes, while still providing improved accessibility. Although low-floor vehicles began to be developed in the 1920s, the first low-floor tram is generally recognized as the Duewag/ACM Vevey design of 1984 deployed in Geneva, providing a floor height of 480 mm (19 in) ATOR.

== Bus ==
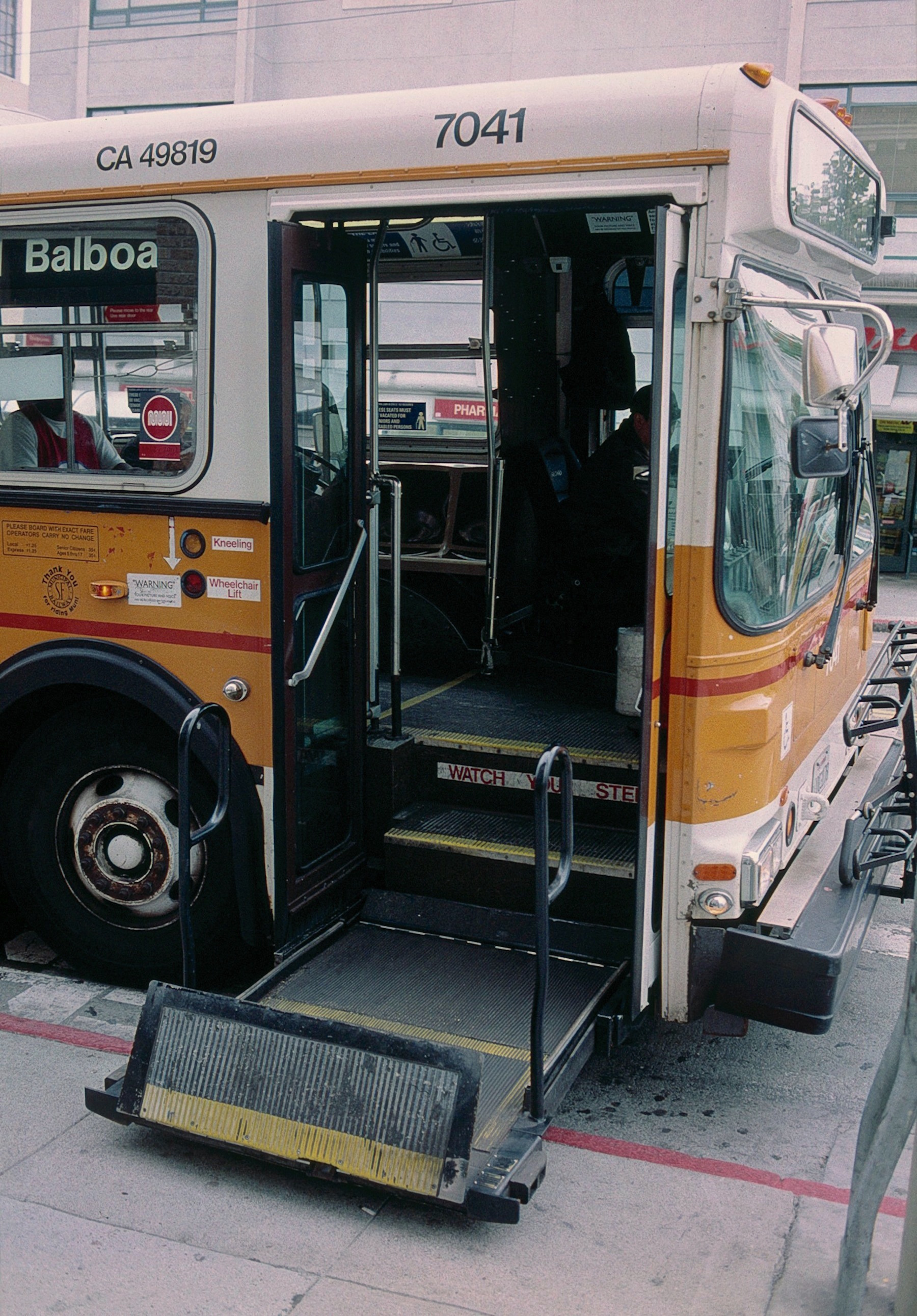
Wheelchair lift on Muni #7041, a New Flyer E60 high floor trolleybus

Tourist coaches generally have very high floors, sometimes greater than 1,000 mm (39 in) above the road surface, in order to have ample room for luggage under the floor. Since boarding must be allowed directly from flat ground, long and steep staircases are needed. Transit buses also use high floors to provide mechanical clearances for solid axles, but the use of dropped axles has enabled the creation of low-floor buses and by 2008 in the United States, the majority of new transit bus orders were for low-floor types.

== Use ==
=== Europe ===
==== Germany ====
Today, in Germany, all rapid transit railways, most commuter trains, and many light rail vehicles operate as high-floor networks. A notable exception is the city railway in Cologne; in the mid-1990s, it was decided to divide that city's partially high-platform network into two separate networks: high-floor and low-floor.

In contrast with some light rail underground lines, which are often provisionally equipped with low platforms or with tracks laid on raised ballast, there are new developments in the German cities of Düsseldorf (Wehrhahn line) and Dortmund (east–west line). In each of these cities, a new underground light rail line is equipped with platforms for low-floor trams and will be permanently operated with low-floor vehicles. This form of design and construction will avoid the need for subsequent rebuilding of stops on tram routes, even though both cities already have underground lines with high-floor platforms.

==== United Kingdom ====
Buses in the UK were traditionally step-entrance built, however this has created problems for people who use wheelchairs as the buses are not wheelchair accessible, as well as being somewhat difficult for passengers with reduced mobility and parents who may be carrying prams and pushchairs.

Although an early wheelchair-friendly High-floor bus with a low step-entrance, capable of kneeling and having the option of being fitted with a wheelchair ramp for wheelchair access called the Wright Endurance was introduced in 1992, its successor from all of its future bus designs; the low-floor buses were first phased into the UK in 1994, however a large number of step-entrance buses remained in use as well as being manufactured. However, with the popularity of low-floor buses expanding by the late 1990s due to their easy accessibility for elderly passengers with reduced mobility, passengers with disabilities and parents carrying prams and pushchairs, the production of step-entrance buses slowed, with the last ever non-compliant step-entrance bus design being the double-decked East Lancs Pyoneer in 1997.

The production of step-entrance buses in the UK almost fully ceased by 31 December 2000, with the legal requirement for new buses produced to be wheelchair accessible, which forced bus manufacturers to concentrate on making low-floor buses, however bus operators were still allowed to order secondhand non-compliant step-entrance buses and run them on their services until they reach the end of their economic or maintainable life. To get around this, a wheelchair compliant step-entrance bus introduced by Wrightbus, the Eclipse SchoolRun was produced in 2006, fitted with a wheelchair lift to allow wheelchair-using passengers onto the bus, but no further wheelchair compliant step-entrance bus designs were produced.

Due to the Terms Of The Disability Discrimination Act requiring all buses in public service to be wheelchair accessible, non-compliant step-entrance single deckers and their low floor counterparts were outlawed after 31 December 2015, with non-compliant step-entrance double deckers and their low floor counterparts following suit after 31 December 2016, however exemptions apply for the limited use of non-compliant heritage buses on vintage bus services, as well as Transport For London's Heritage Routemasters due to their service being overlaid on the high-frequency low-floor Route 15.

=== North America ===
==== United States ====
In San Francisco, the Muni Metro light-rail system, which has both on-street and underground stations, uses a combination of high and low platforms, and the vehicles feature retractable stairs to accommodate both platform types. For on-street stations, stairs are deployed within the vehicle to allow boarding from low platforms; as the trains move underground, the stairs rise until they are flush with the floor to allow boarding from high platforms. The T Third Street, however, was built with high platforms to allow level boarding on the entire line.

== See also ==
- List of buses
- Low floor
- Low-floor bus
- Low-floor tram
- Railway platform height
- Street running
- Tram stop
