= Courtray Design Biennale Interieur =

Belgian design exhibition

Coordinates: 50°48′27.14″N 3°16′38.39″E

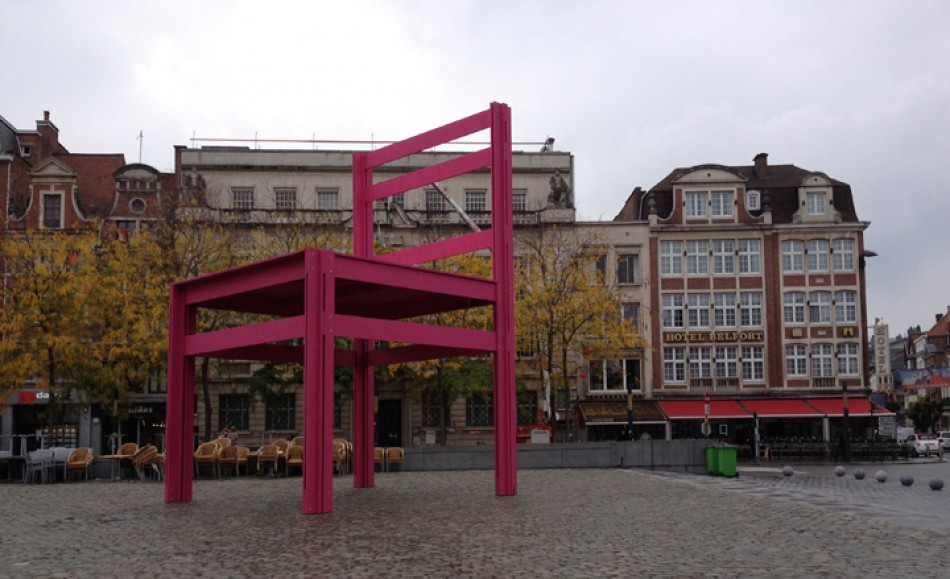
During the 2012 Design Biennale Interieur Courtray, a large scale model of a chair was placed on the central city square, the Grand Square, in order to attract the visitors' attention.

The Courtray Design Biennale Interieur (Dutch: Design Biënnale Interieur Kortrijk) is a major international design exhibition that takes place once every two years (in even years) in the Belgian city of Courtray (Kortrijk in Dutch). The first Interieur Design Biennale took place in 1968. The Biennale is organised by the Biennale Interieur npo. During the fair, producers and designers present their innovating interior products to a broad cultural, commercial and professional audience. Over the years, the fair has introduced a number of side activities such as the YoungDesignersFair, Design at Work, Exterieur, lectures and debates.

== History ==
The first Design Biennale was held in 1968. The event took place in the 'Halls of Kortrijk', a new exhibition complex near the E17 highway. The event became more and more international during the following decades, and so it became one of the most important design biennales in Europe with international acclaim. At the 2012 Design Biennale, the exhibition space came to the city centre for the first time. During this Biennale, not only the halls in Kortrijk Xpo, but also the brand new Arts Centre in the Buda Factory were used to exhibit new design. A shuttle service connected both exhibition spaces. The Biennale ventured even more in the heart of the city in 2014 with sublime locations such as the Buda Factory, the Buda Tower, the Broelmuseum and the Broeltowers. In 2016, Interieur will be centred around Kortrijk Xpo and the site of the Vlasmuseum in the heart of Kortrijk.

== Format ==
The aim of the Biennale Interieur npo is to promote creativity in product development and design, through the means of a major international Biennale, which offers an overview of the most recent developments and the most successful projects in product development and design. The 2012 fair will, for the first time in its history, take place both at the Expo halls and in the city centre, where activities are planned in the Buda Design Factory.

== Guests of Honour ==
World famous design personalities have been invited as guest of honour:

- 1968: Simon Mari Pruys (NL)
- 1970: Raymond Loewy (VS)
- 1972: Gio Ponti (IT)
- 1974: Verner Panton (DK/CH)
- 1976: Gillo Dorfles (IT)
- 1978: Philip Rosenthal (DE)
- 1980: Jean Prouvé (FR)
- 1982: Alessandro Mendini (IT)
- 1984: Herman Liebaers (BE)
- 1986: Philippe Starck (FR)
- 1988: Geert Bekaert (BE)
- 1990: Andrea Branzi (IT)
- 1992: Dieter Rams (DE)
- 1994: Jasper Morrison (UK)
- 1996: Jean Nouvel (FR)
- 1998: Rolf Fehlbaum (CH)
- 2000: Konstantin Grcic (DE)
- 2002: Michael Young (UK)
- 2004: James Irvine (UK) & Kirsti Paakkanen (FI)
- 2006: Alfredo Häberli (CH/ARG)
- 2008: Jaime Hayon (ES)
- 2010: Jun'ya Ishigami (JP)
- 2012: Nendo (Japan), Troika (UK), Studio Makkink & Bey (NL), David Bowen (US), Ross Lovegrove (UK), Greg Lynn (VS) and Muller Van Severen (BE).
- 2014: Joseph Grima (GB)
- 2016: Office Kersten Geers David Van Severen (BE)

== Designer of the year award ==
This Designer of the year award is awarded by the Biennale Interieur npo in cooperation with style magazines Knack and Le Vif Weekend. This award is supported by the Design Museum Gent and Grand-Hornu Images.

- 2006 Alain Berteau
- 2007 Nedda El-Asmar
- 2008 Stefan Schönin
- 2009 Sylvain Willenz
- 2010 Bram Boo (Belgium)
- 2011 Nathalie Dewez (Belgium)
- 2012 Alain Gilles (Belgium)
- 2013 Jean-François D'Or (Belgium)
- 2014 Marina Bautier (Belgium)
- 2015 Muller Van Severen (Belgium)
