= Mercedes-Benz Citaro =

Low-floor bus from Mercedes-Benz/EvoBus

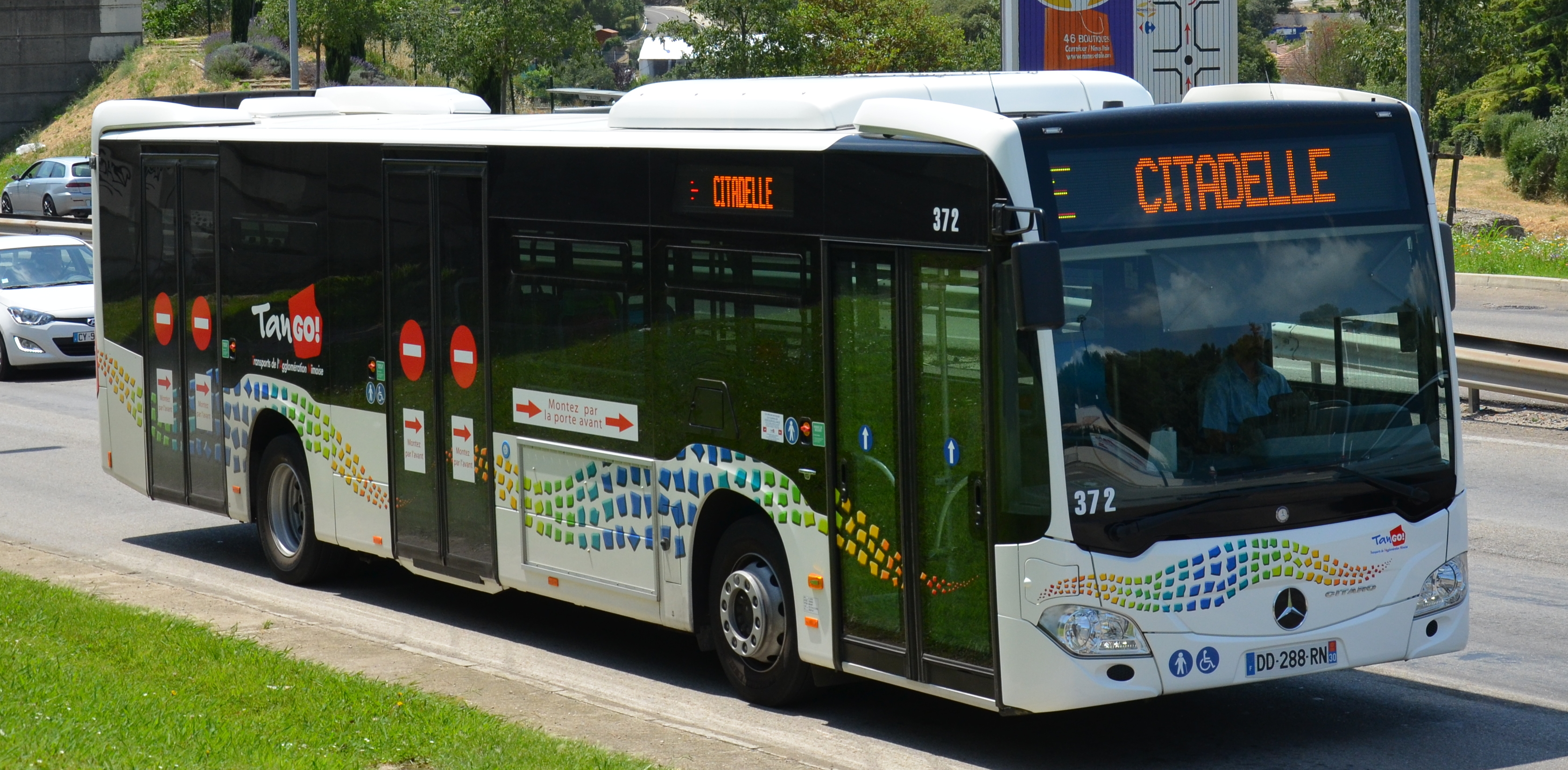
- A Citaro 2nd generation (Euro VI) in Nîmes, France

Overview
- Manufacturer: Mercedes-Benz
- Production: 1997–present
- Assembly: Germany: Mannheim; France: Ligny-en-Barrois; Turkey: Sakarya (low-cost-variant)

Body and chassis
- Class: Integral
- Doors: 1 to 5, depending on order
- Floor type: Low floor or Low entry

Powertrain
- Engine: Present: OM936 OM936h OM470 M936G; No longer available: OM457LA OM457hLA OM906hLA OM926LA M447hLAG
- Capacity: 20–58 seats, 26–152 standees
- Power output: OM906hLA: 170kW; OM936, OM936h: 220kW; OM470: 265kW; M936G: 222kW
- Transmission: Voith DIWA.6, 4-speed automatic transmission ZF-Ecomat, 5-speed automatic transmission (1997–2001); ZF-Ecomat, 6-speed automatic transmission (2001–2011); ZF-EcoLife, 6-speed automatic transmission (since 2010)

Dimensions
- Length: Citaro K: 10,633 mm (34 ft 10.6 in); Citaro: 12,135 mm (39 ft 9.8 in); Citaro G: 18,125 mm (59 ft 5.6 in)
- Width: 2,550 mm (8 ft 4.4 in)
- Height: 3,130 mm (10 ft 3.2 in)
- Curb weight: 18,475–29,000 kg (40,730–63,934 lb)

Chronology
- Predecessor: O405; O405N

The Mercedes-Benz Citaro is a low-floor single-decker, rigid or articulated bus manufactured by Mercedes-Benz/EvoBus. Introduced in 1997, the Citaro is available in a range of configurations, and is in widespread use throughout Europe and parts of Asia, with more than 55,000 produced by December 2019.

== History ==
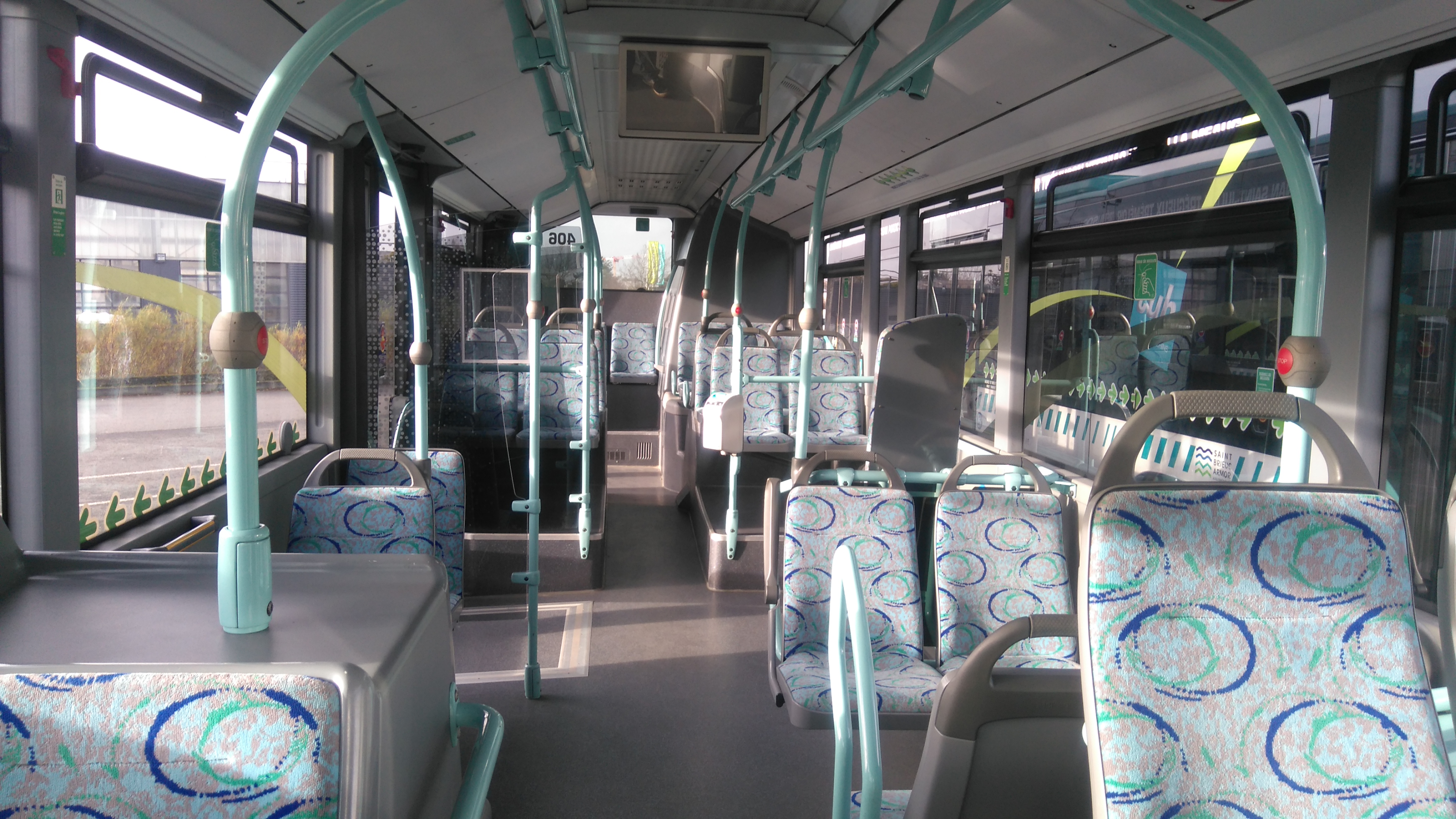
Mercedes-Benz Citaro C2 (Euro VI) interior

The first generation Citaro was launched in 1997, as a successor to the Mercedes-Benz O405N.

In 2005, an updated version of the Citaro to coincide with the introduction of Euro IV- (and later Euro V- and EEV-) compliant engines. Apart from minor technical alterations, mainly to accommodate the new generation of engines, the external design received a facelift to give the buses a less angular look, with internal panelling altered accordingly. Production of the old model ceased by autumn 2006.

In 2006 the Citaro received a much more substantial facelift, which can be seen from the outside by a revised front and rear design (analogous to the recently introduced low-entry buses). The hitherto characteristic feature of the first series, the "washboard trim" on the front of the vehicle, which was also available as a front advertising area and smooth surface without Mercedes star, accounted for a somewhat rounded front baffle. The lateral sweep of the front turn signals was reversed.

In May 2011, the second generation Citaro, referred to internally as the C2, was launched. From 2012, the C2 could also be equipped with Euro 6 engines. The C2 versions of the Citaro LE models were the last to be presented, at Busworld Kortrijk in October 2013.

== Models ==
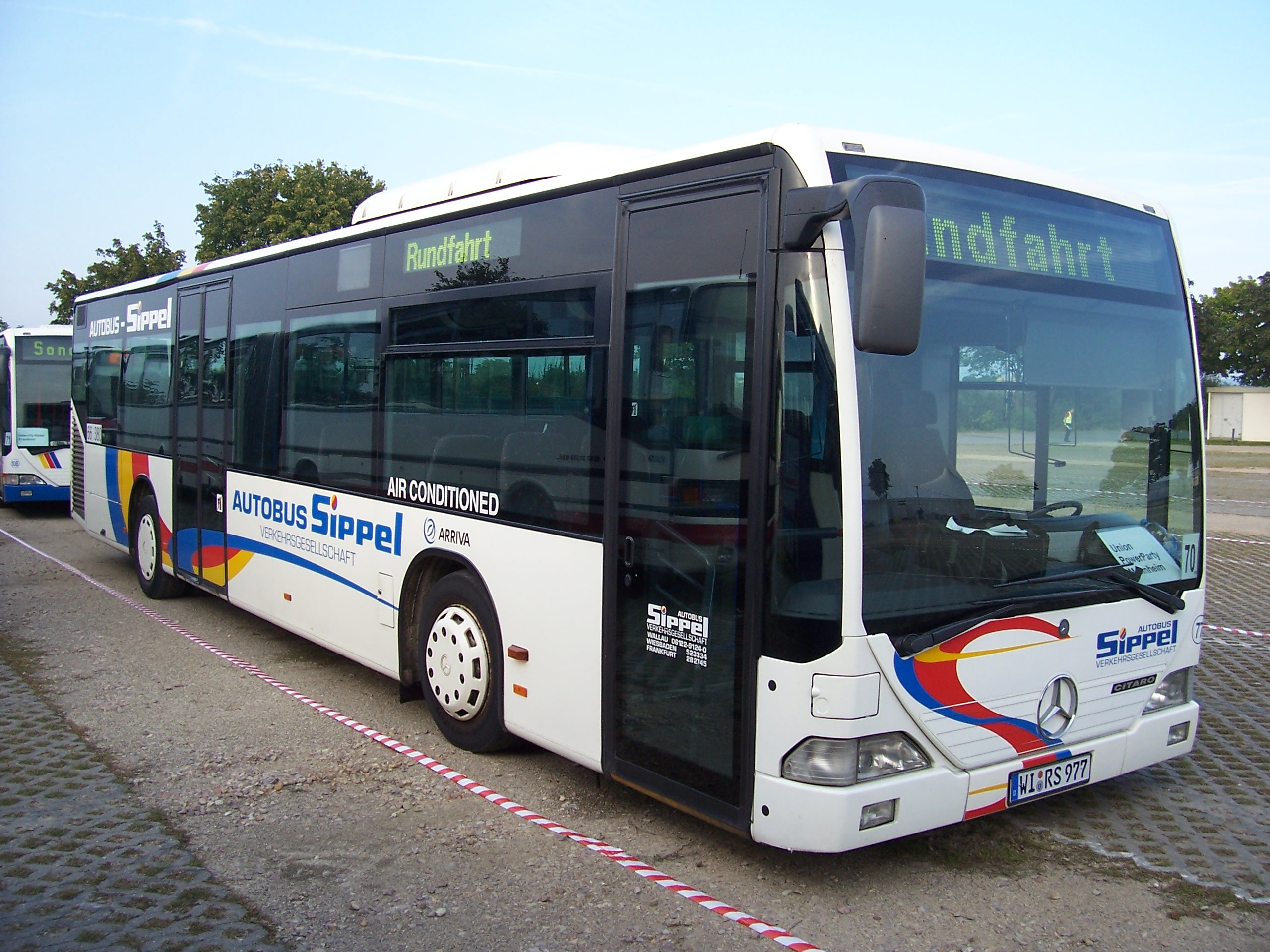
Citaro Ü 1st generation

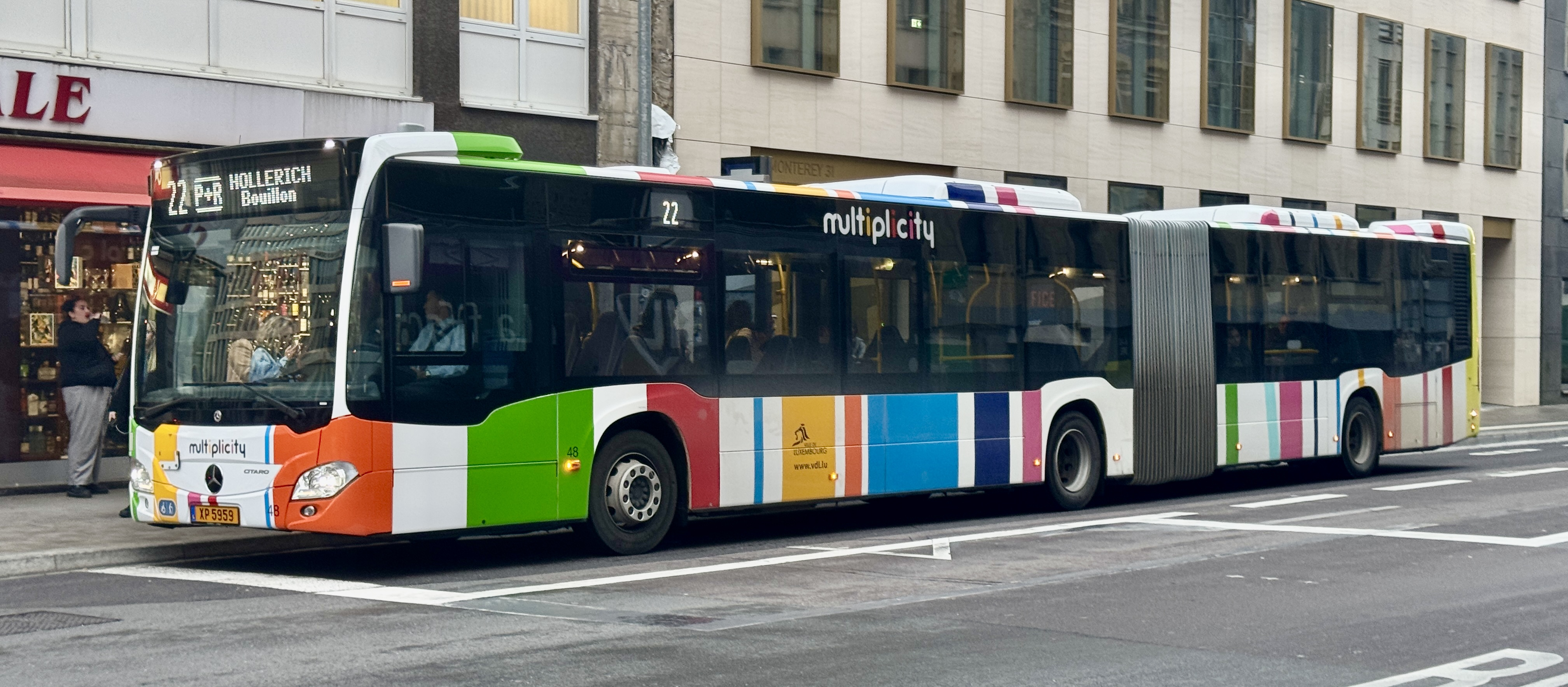
Citaro G 2nd generation

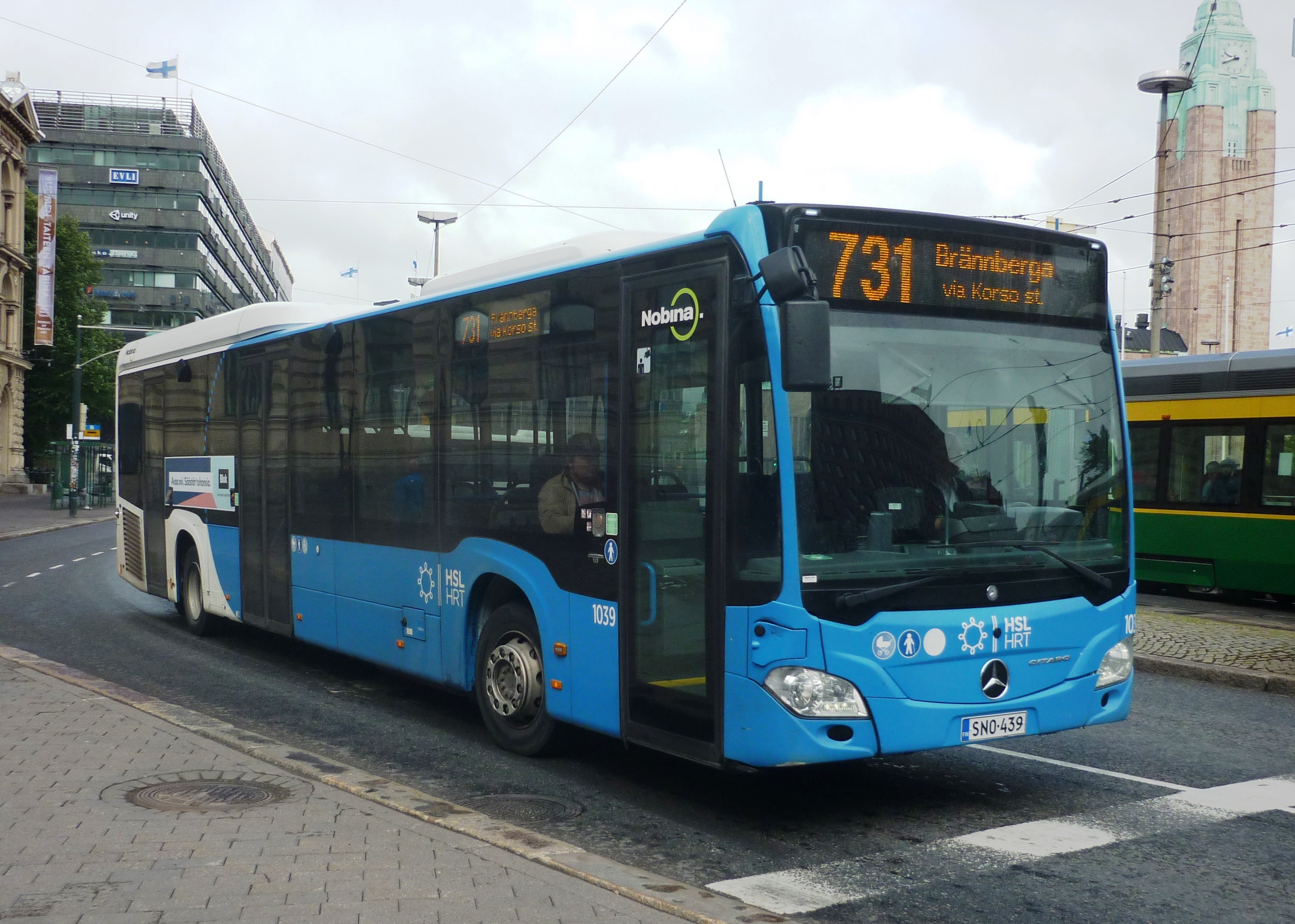
Citaro LE MÜ 2nd generation (3 doors)

There are three basic versions of the Citaro available in 2019: The standard 12m Citaro, the shorter 10m Citaro K and the articulated 18m Citaro G. Hybrid versions of all three lengths and one full electric version with standard and articulated versions are also available.

=== Urban model (Current) ===
The standard urban model is available in a number of versions:

- O530 diesel: solo bus, length 12m, 2 axles, horizontal or vertical engine, 2 or 3 doors, even with front door only (in countries with left-hand traffic)
- O530 eCitaro/battery-electric: solo bus with full electric drive (battery), length 12m, 2 axles, 2 or 3 doors
- O530 diesel-electric Hybrid: solo bus with diesel-electric drive, length 12m, 2 axles, 2 or 3 doors
- O530 NGT: solo bus with natural gas drive, length 12m, 2 axles, 2 or 3 doors
- O530 NGT Hybrid: solo bus with natural gas-electric drive, length 12m, 2 axles, 2 or 3 doors
- O530 G diesel: articulated bus, length 18m, 3 axles, horizontal or vertical engine, 3 or 4 doors, also with 2 doors only (in countries with left-hand traffic)
- O530 G diesel-electric Hybrid: articulated bus with diesel-electric drive, length 18m, 3 axles, 3 or 4 doors
- O530 G NGT: articulated bus with natural gas drive, length 18m, 3 axles, 3 or 4 doors
- O530 GL: articulated bus (long) (CapaCity), length 19.5m, 4 axles, 3 or 4 doors
- O530 GL II: articulated bus (long) (CapaCity L), length 21.0m, 4 axles, 4 or 5 doors
- O530 K diesel: midibus, length 10.5m, 2 axles, horizontal or vertical engine, 2 or 3 doors
- O530 K diesel-electric Hybrid: midibus with diesel-electric drive, length 10.5m, 2 axles, 2 or 3 doors
- O530 LE diesel: low entry solo bus, length 12m, 2 axles, horizontal engine, 2 or 3 doors (the 3rd door is only available as single door)
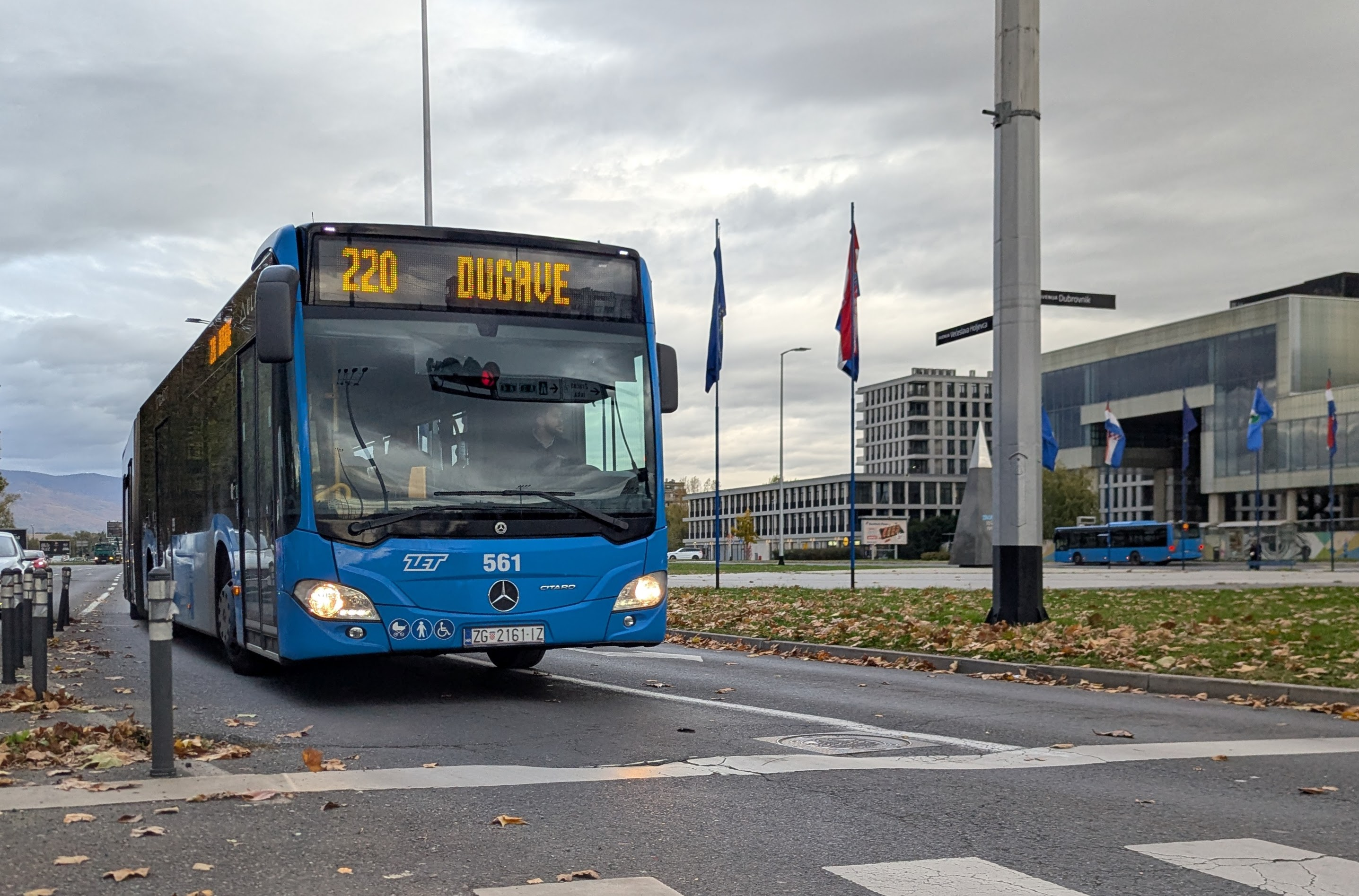
- Citaro G Articulated on ZET line 220 to Dugave in Zagreb
  O530 LE Hybrid: low entry solo bus with diesel-electric drive, length 12m, 2 axles, 2 or 3 doors (the 3rd door is only available as single door)

=== Suburban / interurban model (Current) ===
A series of suburban/interurban versions is also produced, with single front doors and all seats fitted on platforms:

- O530 GÜ: articulated bus, length 18m, 3 axles, 3 doors
- O530 LE Ü: low-entry solo bus, length 12m, 2 axles, 2 doors
- O530 LE MÜ: low-entry (medium length), length 13m, 2 axles, 2 or 3 doors (the 3rd door is only available as single door)
- O530 Ü diesel: solo bus, length 12m, 2 axles, 2 doors
- O530 Hybrid Ü: solo bus with diesel-electric drive, length 12m, 2 axles, 2 doors

=== Discontinued models ===
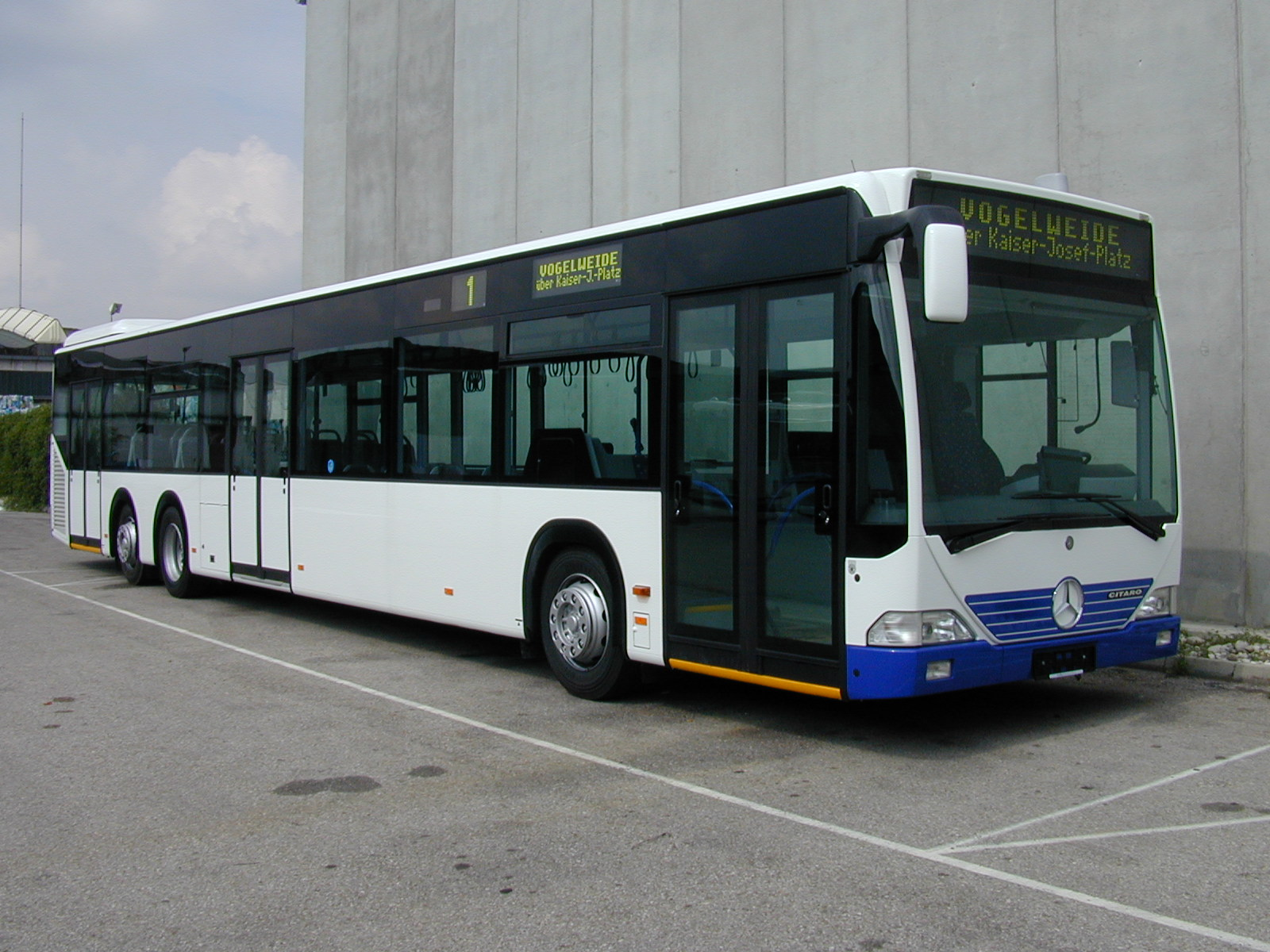
Citaro L 1st generation

==== Urban ====
- O530 CNG: natural gas drive, length 12m, 2 axles, 2 or 3 doors (renamed as O530 NGT)
- O530 G CNG: articulated bus with natural gas drive, length 18m, 3 axles, 3 or 4 doors (renamed as O530 G NGT)
- O530 FuelCell Hybrid: hydrogen-fuel cell hybrid drive, length 12m, 2 axles, 3 doors
- O530 G BlueTec Hybrid: articulated bus with diesel-electric hybrid drive, length 18m, 3 axles, 3 or 4 doors
- O530 L: solo bus (long), length 15m, 3 axles, 2 or 3 doors

==== Suburban / interurban ====
- O530 MÜ: solo bus (medium length), length 13m, 2 axles, 2 doors
- O530 LÜ: solo bus (long), length 15m, 3 axles, 2 or 3 doors

=== Specifications ===
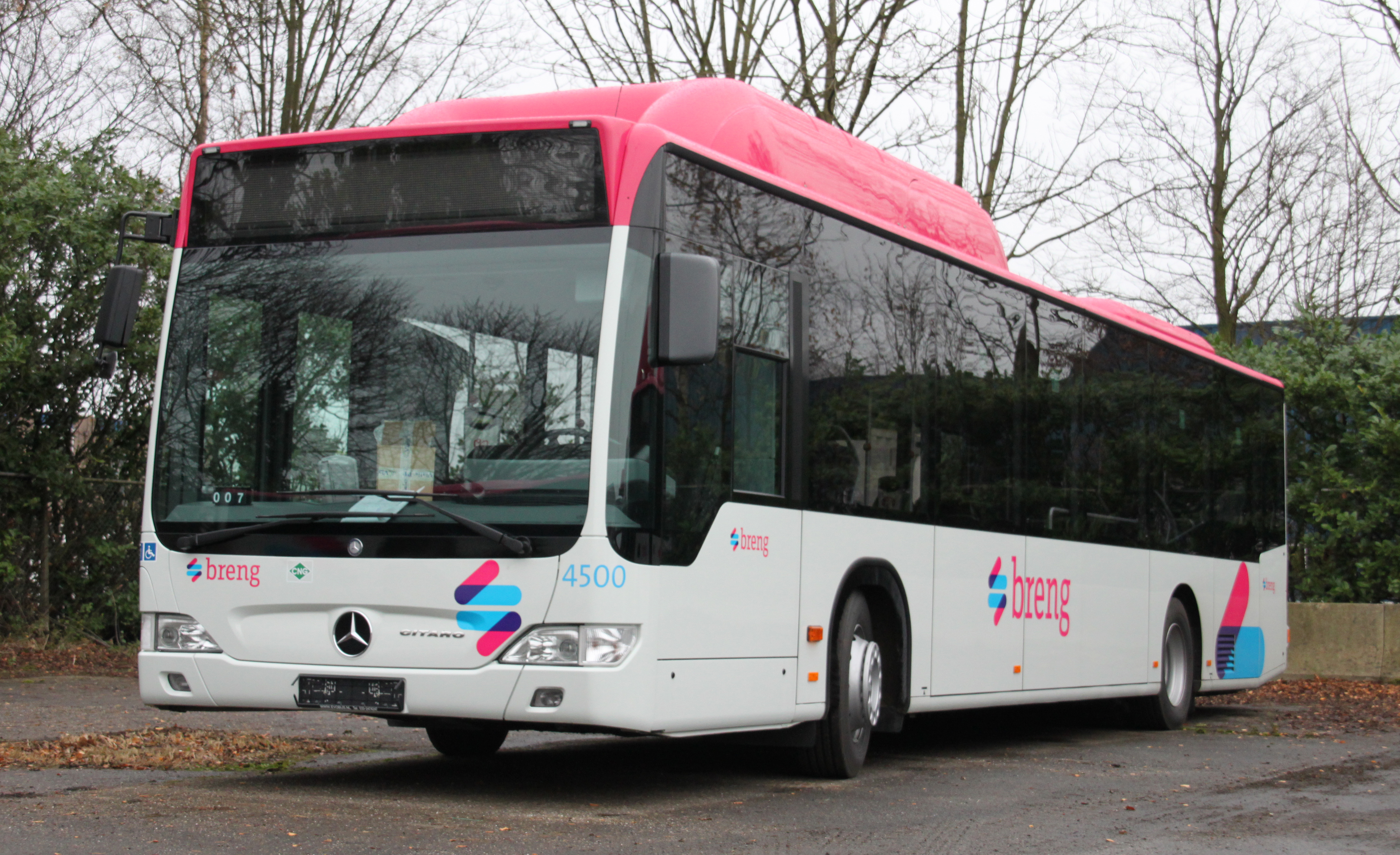
Citaro CNG 1st generation facelift

Operators are able to choose between two different front stylings: the standard design features an angled destination display, like a roof dome, and is primarily marketed for urban buses, while a version with a one-piece windscreen covering the destination display also is available and is primarily intended for interurban use. However, all models are available with either version.

With the introduction of second generation Citaro, the front destination display was slightly enlarged, which juts a bit out of the vehicle roof. As a result, Mercedes-Benz designed a small fairing at both sides of destination display. This fairing is available on all models by default. Later, after the introduction of Euro VI version, which results a complete structural change in engine compartment, also the rear destination display was enlarged and added with a fairing. However, afterwards, customers are also able to order a front display without fairing, whether urban or interurban versions.

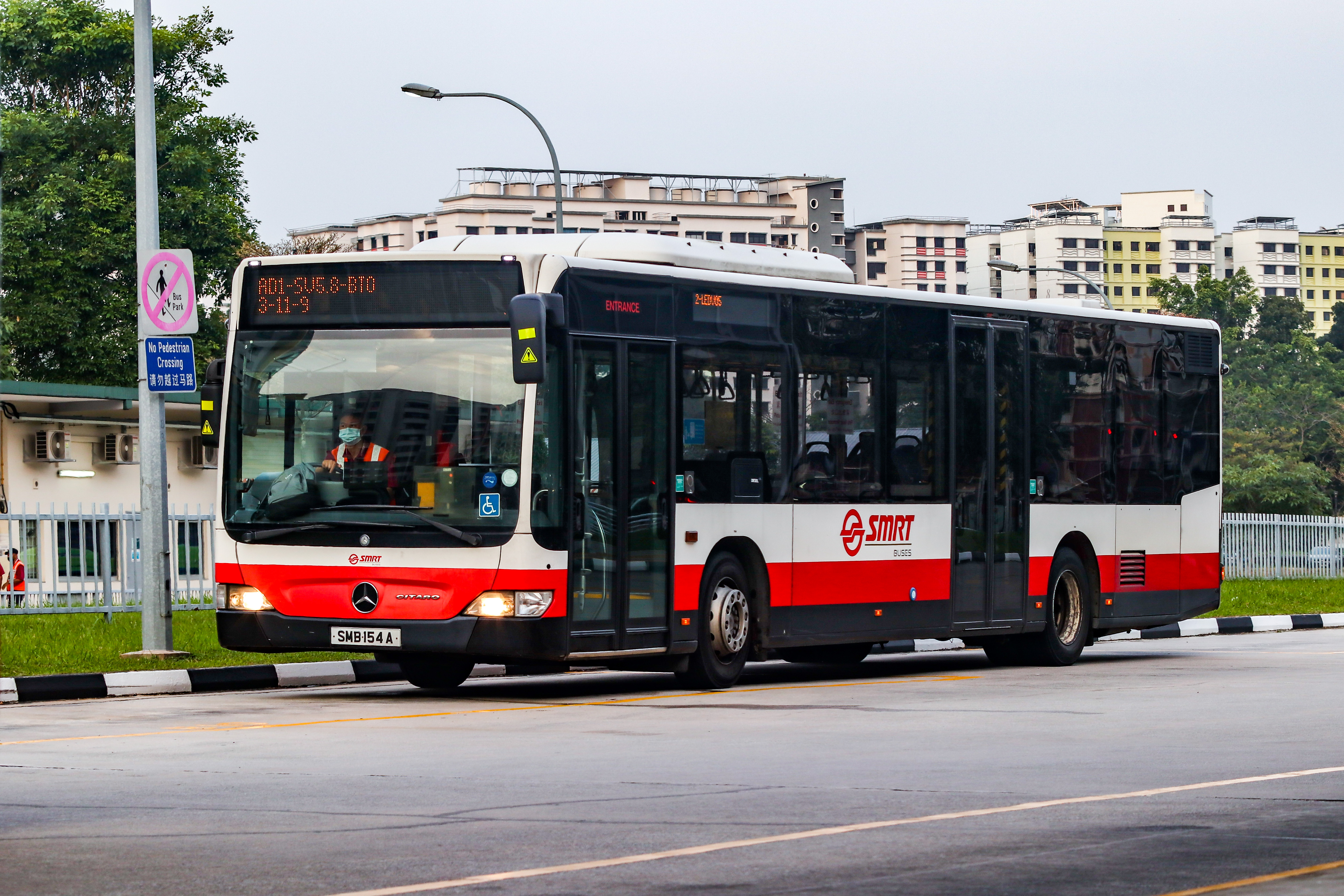
A Citaro operated by SMRT Buses

Other customizations include the number and type of doors as well as the interior layout. Two types of seats are offered as part of the standard range, again with a basic model for urban use and an enhanced version for longer-distance routes, although both also are available on all models.

Aside from the usual diesel engines, the Citaro is also available with a powerful Euro VI natural gas engine M936G rated by 222 kW. It can be optionally combined with the new hybrid system of Mercedes-Benz, which helps to save more fuel and lower emissions.

=== Non-standard bodies ===
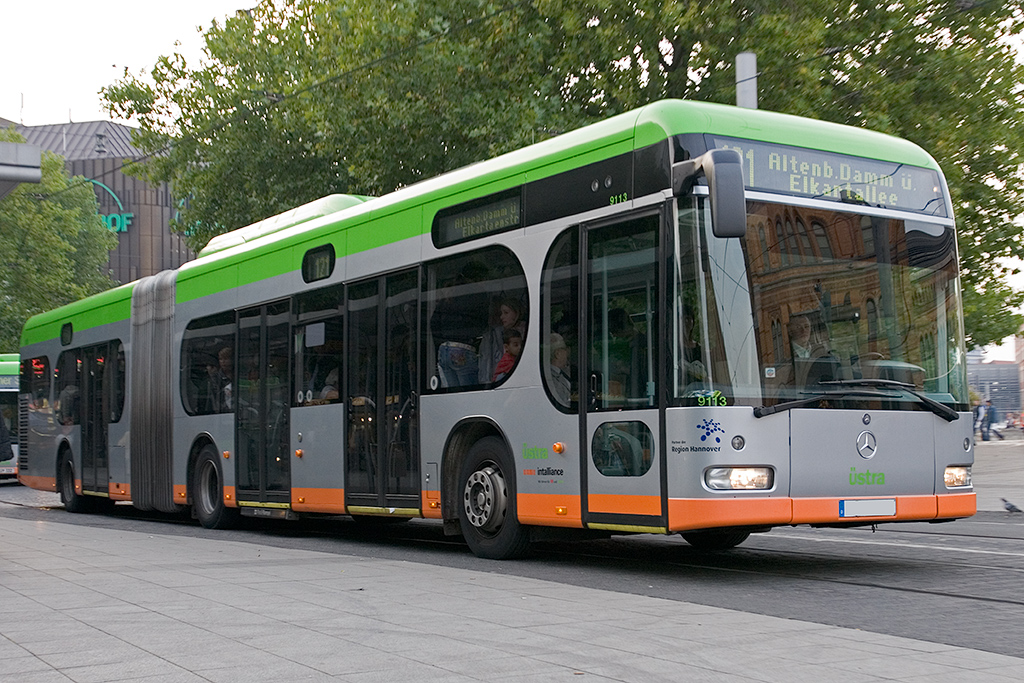
Irvine-Citaro of ÜSTRA Hannover

As a one-off, German operators üstra of Hanover and LVB of Leipzig took delivery of a batch of Citaros bodied to a special design by James Irvine for Expo 2000. Leipzig's vehicles were lent to Hanover for the duration of the exhibition, but subsequently returned to normal service in their home city. All other Citaros bodied by Mercedes-Benz were to standard designs, however a number of chassis were bodied by independent manufacturers, most notably Hess of Switzerland. However, the Citaro has more recently only been sold as a complete product.

In 2007 the workshops of the Szeged (Hungary) bus operator SZKT converted a regular Citaro to a trolleybus. As of April 2010, five such buses are already serving as a trolley and more examples are in preparation in the near future.

In 2009, the Centre of Ambulance Services in Dubai took delivery of three Citaros, which had been modified to become the world's largest ambulances.

In 2010, the French city Rennes ordered a longer version of the Citaro, the Citaro M, which is 13 meters long with an urban arrangement. 15 vehicles were built over the chassis of the Setra S416NF.

=== Hydrogen fuel cell version ===
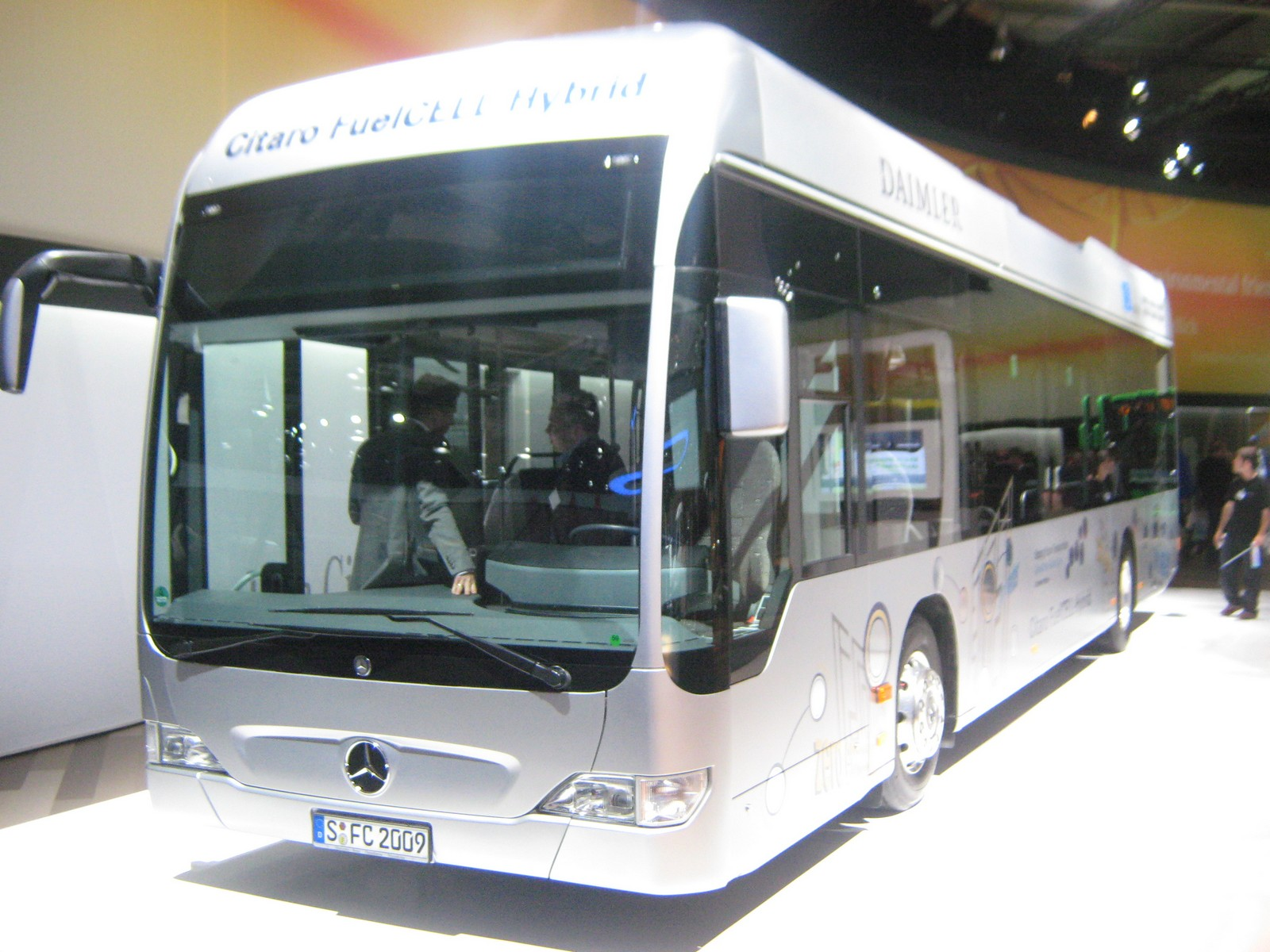
Citaro FuelCell Hybrid 1st generation facelift at IAA Hannover 2010

Even though the usual Citaro models are powered by diesel or natural gas, there is also a hydrogen fuel cell-powered version, designated Citaro BZ or O530BZ (BZ stands for "Brennstoffzelle" in German, or "fuel cell" in English). During the combustion process, only water steam are produced, so the vehicle is very environmentally friendly. The hydrogen tanks are located in the roof, which results an increased vehicle height at 3.68 m (12 ft 1 in). These buses have 3 doors, low floor configurations, and are capable for a top speed of 70 km/h (43 mph). About 35 of these buses have been in service in a variety of different world cities in order to test the feasibility of hydrogen fuel cells in numerous countries or continents (including UK, Australia and China), different operating circumstances and different conditions, especially weather conditions.

=== Hybrid electric version ===
The Mercedes-Benz Citaro G BlueTec Hybrid is a series-hybrid articulated bus with a compact 450 kg, 4-cylinder, 4.8-litre, 160 kW, Euro 4 OM-924LA diesel engine providing power for a roof-mounted 19.4 kWh lithium-ion battery pack, and four 80 kW electric wheel hub motors located on the centre and rear axles. (Contrast a conventional bus diesel engine: 6-cylinder, 12-litre, 1,000 kg.) The battery pack is also charged by regenerative braking (recuperation). The manufacturer anticipates fuel consumption 20% lower than conventional diesel Citaros. In 2010, selected bendy buses were delivered in hybrid version to Wuppertal, Stuttgart, Krefeld, Hamburg and Mülheim. Other buses were also delivered to Essen, Duisburg, Munich, Mainz, Hamburg and Rostock are also in the rigid versions. The Dresden and Leipzig also delivered their Citaro hybrid buses in 2011.

Eventually, Daimler decided not to upgrade BlueTec Hybrid variants to second generation of Citaro. Instead, in 2017, they launched Citaro Hybrid variants of Citaro (diesel) and NGT, which uses mild hybrid drive, much cheaper to manufacture than BlueTec Hybrid drive. It uses 14 kW, disc-shaped electric motor mounted between combustion engine and transmission for energy recuperation and can provide a torque of up to 220 Nm.

=== Battery version / eCitaro ===
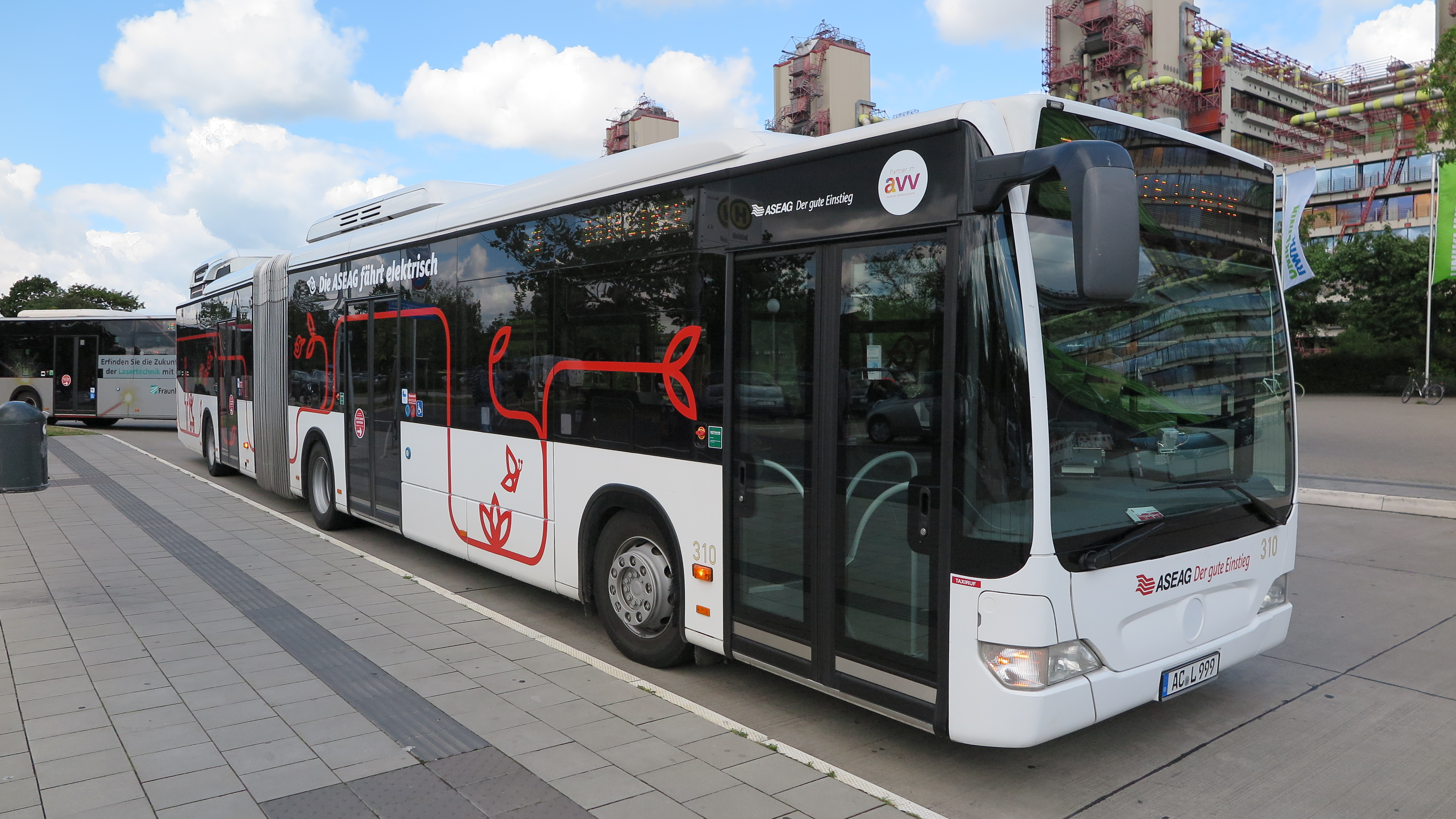
A battery-powered ASEAG Aachen Citaro G (1st generation facelift)

Since 2015, Aachen Transport runs a battery-powered Citaro articulated bus as a test in scheduled operation. The vehicle was converted in 2014 from a hybrid bus to a battery bus. They removed all diesel components and installed 1300 traction batteries with a total capacity of approximately 180 kWh. The axle loads remained unchanged. The vehicle has four wheel hub motors with 60 kW continuous power on the second and third axle and has a range of more than 50 kilometres (30 mi). The conversion was carried out as part of the EU project Civitas (Cleaner and better transport in cities) and was funded by the Aachen Transport Association to 75 percent. The costs for the hardware (e.g. batteries) amounted to approximately 700,000 euros.

Mercedes-Benz tested prototypes of the Citaro with full electric drive. The bus features a modular battery pack design and use the same electric wheel hub motors as the Citaro G BlueTec Hybrid. It was launched at the IAA Commercial Vehicles show in Hanover in September 2018 as eCitaro. It uses modified bodywork of standard Citaro with front adopted from Daimler's concept Future Bus. It was first launched as 12 m solo bus. Later, an articulated 18 m version of eCitaro (also known as eCitaro G) was added to offer.

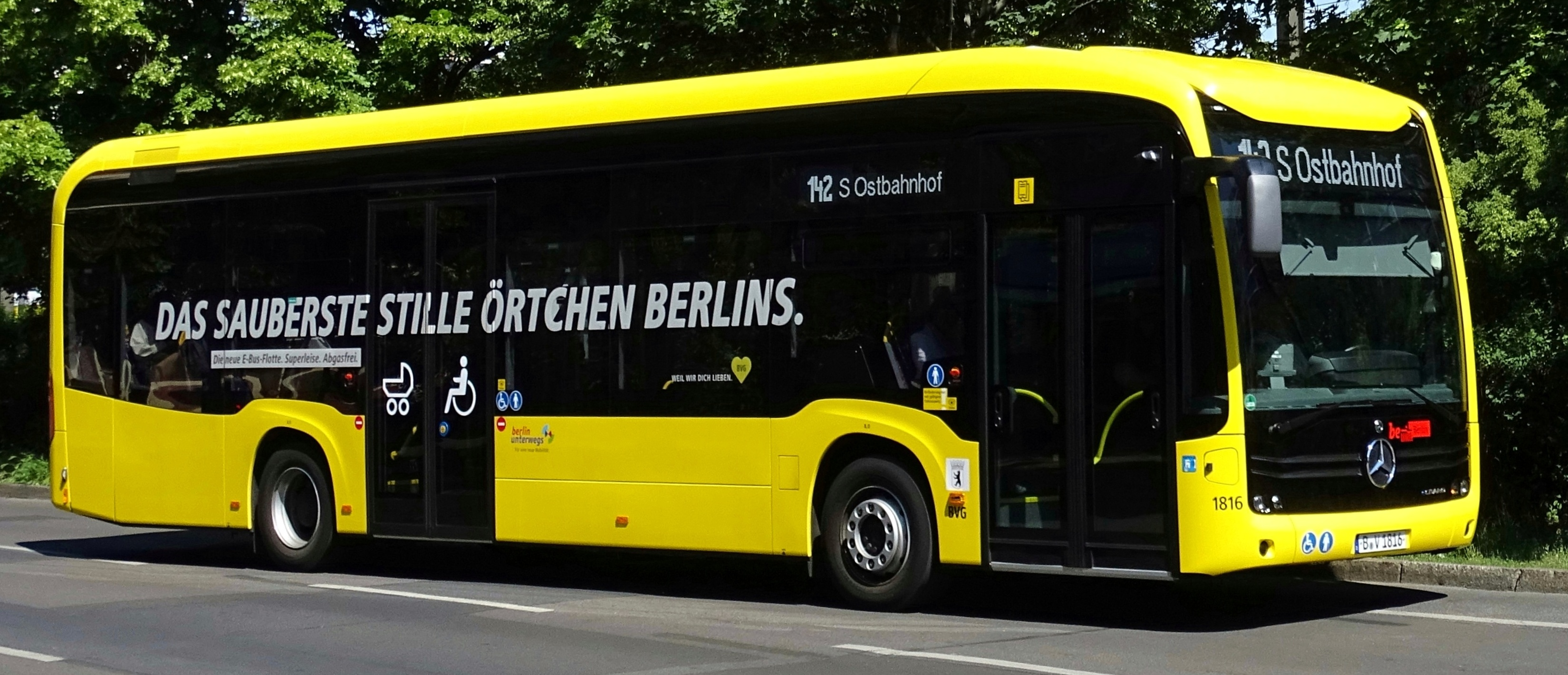
Mercedes-Benz eCitaro in service in Berlin-Mitte

On 15 November 2018, the first series of eCitaro was delivered to its first customer: Hochbahn AG, a public transport company in Hamburg, with a total of 20 at first. In year 2019, more customers started operating eCitaros, including Rhein-Neckar-Verkehr GmbH (RNV), Berliner Verkehrsbetriebe (BVG), Zugerland Verkehrsbetriebe (ZVB), and Bus Ostschweiz (BOS). This was also followed with orders from Verkehrsbetriebe Hamburg-Holstein (VHH) with 16 buses, ESWE Verkehrsgesellschaft mbH from Wiesbaden with 56, and ÜSTRA from Hannover with 48. Mercedes-Benz also received orders from foreign countries, which contains Luxembourg, Norway, and Sweden. In addition, the eCitaro has been crowned to City Bus of the Year 2019 in Spain on 11 February 2019. In 2021, the national bus operator of Hungary, Volánbusz ordered 40 eCitaros, and in 2023, Transdev Blazefield in the United Kingdom ordered 35 eCitaros for their Harrogate Bus Company and Keighley Bus Company subsidiaries, the first 20 of which entered service with the former in November 2024.

In 2023, a version with a Toyota hydrogen fuel cell range extender will be offered, allowing a range of up to 400 kilometres (250 mi), compared to 280 kilometres (170 mi) for the battery electric model.

On 15 September 2024, Mercedes-Benz launched a shorter 10.63-meter version at the IAA Commercial Vehicles show in Hanover. Called the eCitaro K, it featured a 4,398 mm wheelbase and a turning radius of just 17.28 meters. The eCitaro K is powered by a five high-voltage battery packs with a combined capacity of 491 kWh and delivers a range of 300 km under optimal conditions.

=== Overhead wire version ===
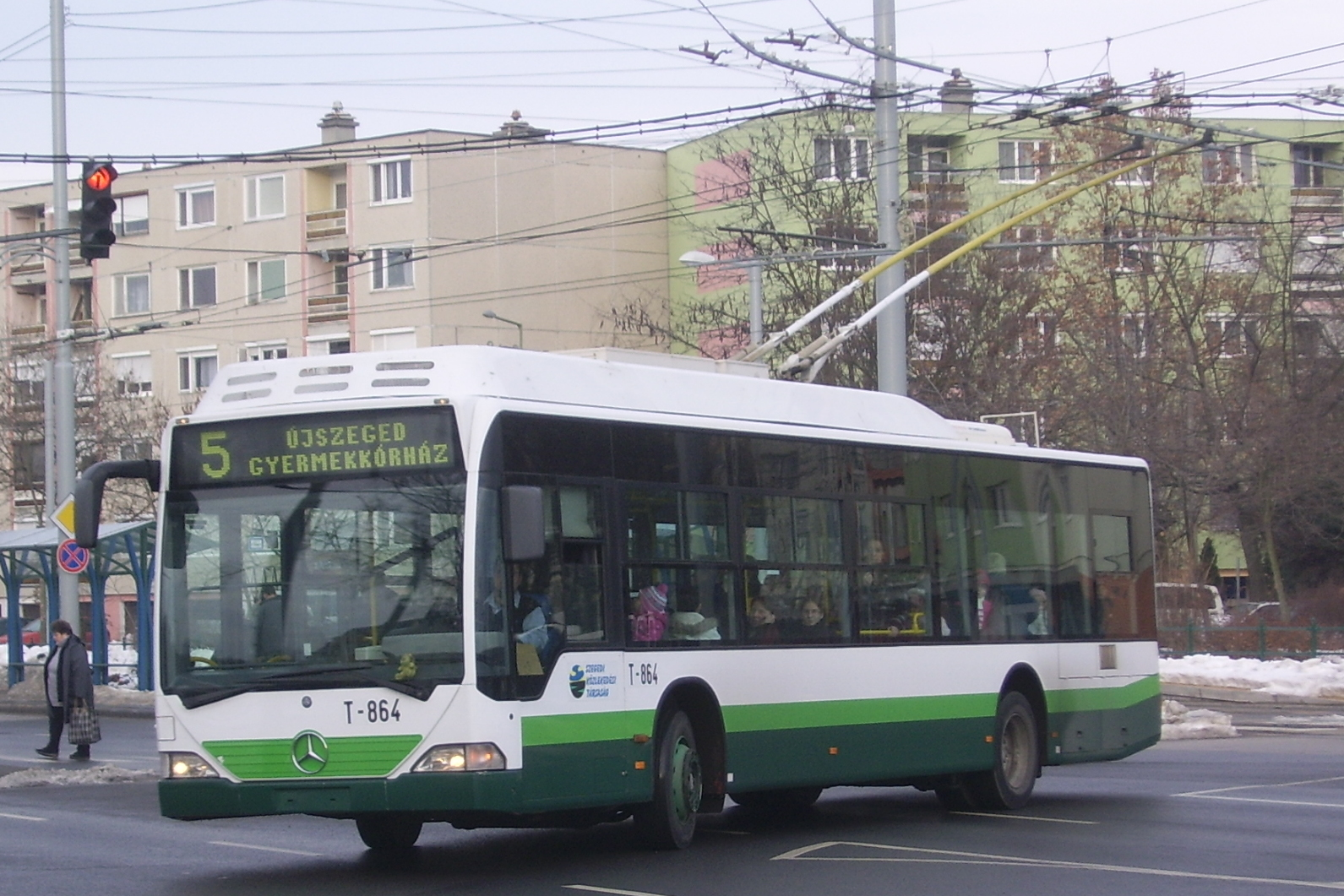
A Citaro 1st generation as trolleybus in Szeged, Hungary

Because EvoBus itself does not offer trolleybuses, the transport companies of the Hungarian city of Szeged independently built six second-hand Citaro solo vehicles into trolleybuses between 2006 and 2010. This is expected to save on spare parts inventory - this can be done together with the same diesel buses of the dispenser series - as well as lower acquisition costs compared to standard production trolleybuses. The modified type designation is O-530 Tr12, the six wagons bear the operating numbers T-860 to T-865.

In 2012, two Citaro trolleybuses also went into operation in Polish Gdynia. The cars with the numbers 3053 and 3054 originated from used acquired diesel buses from Berlin, which had been delivered in 2002.

== CapaCity ==
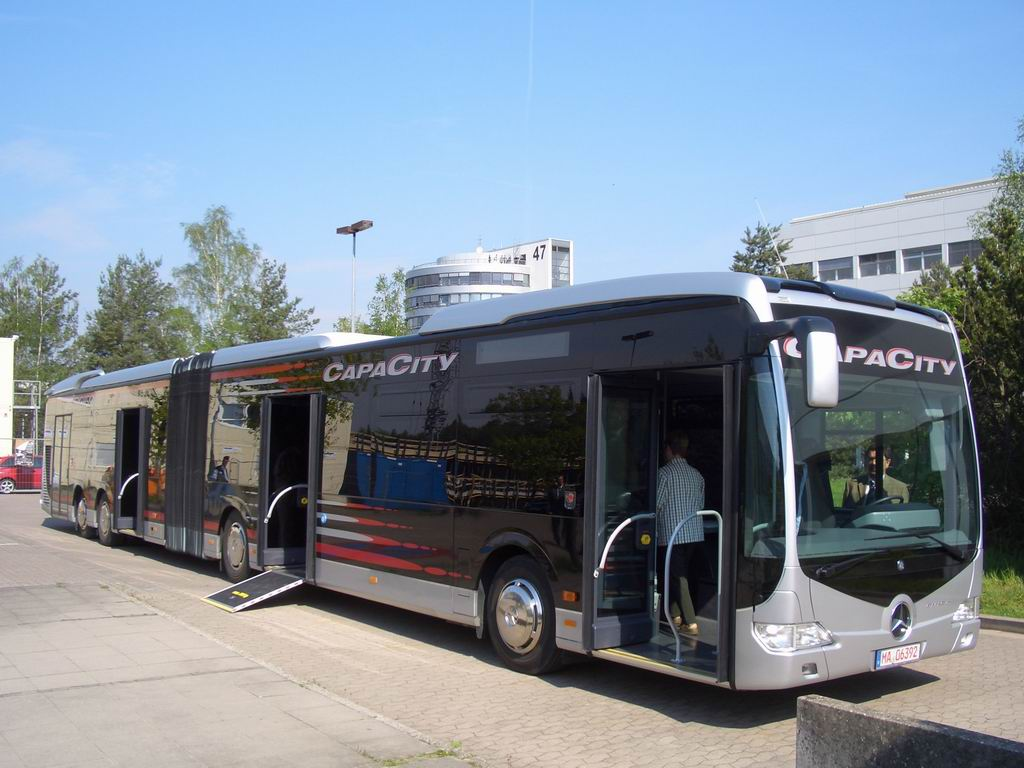
CapaCity 1st generation (MetroDesign)

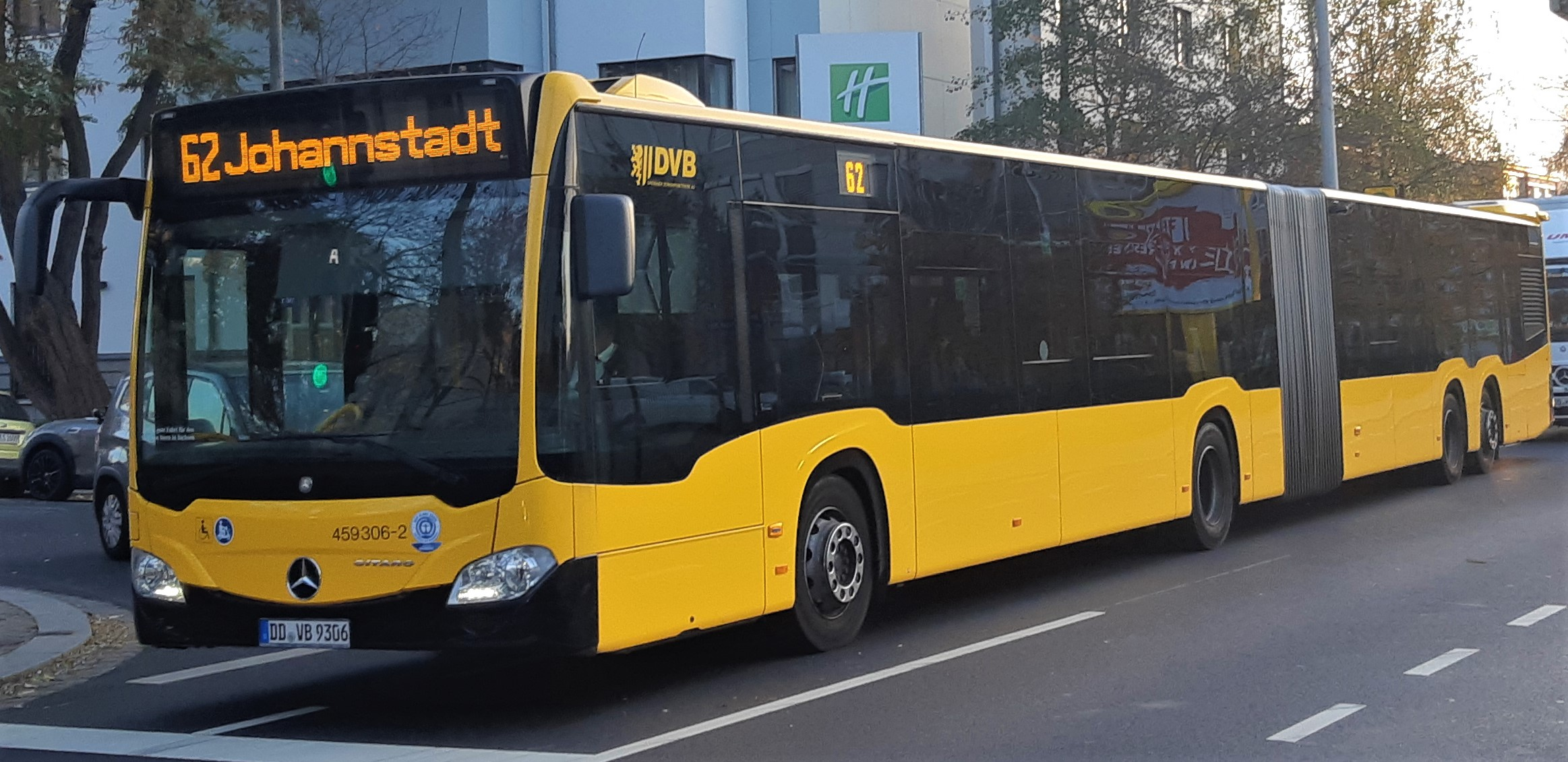
CapaCity L 2nd generation in Dresden

The Mercedes-Benz CapaCity (also known as O530 GL) is a large-capacity articulated bus based on the Citaro G, which was introduced in year 2006. The 1st generation CapaCity was 19.54m long and could carry up to 186 passengers. It featured the same turning circle as that of its shorter related Citaro G (17.94m length) thanks to the actively steered electro hydraulic fourth axle. The safety was guaranteed by Electronic Braking System (EBS), anti-lock brakes (ABS), acceleration skid control (ASR), and the passenger comfort was improved by independent front suspensions. It was both available with 4 and 5 doors. There were also CapaCitys with BRT-Design, which can be recognized by their changed exterior. These buses were in service in Istanbul, Turkey, and Bratislava, Slovakia.

The 2nd generation CapaCity was first presented in year 2014. However, it is the long version "CapaCity L" (21m) which became available at the beginning. The shorter version "CapaCity" with a length of 19.7m was added later. They are all based on the modular system of Mercedes-Benz Citaro. The new feature "Articulation Turntable Controller" (ATC) is designed to prevent jackknifing. The CapaCity L can carry 191 passengers with standard equipment, while the CapaCity can carry 182 passengers. They are offered with four doors by default, but with the "Metro Package", the CapaCity L is also available with five doors, which is better constructed for BRT services. According to Daimler, the CapaCity L is the diesel powered urban bus which uses the least fuel per passenger space.

== Conecto ==
The first generation was offered in 3 variants: the mid-floor C model, the articulated Conecto G, and the high-floor HF model. They were replaced by the Intouro in 2007.

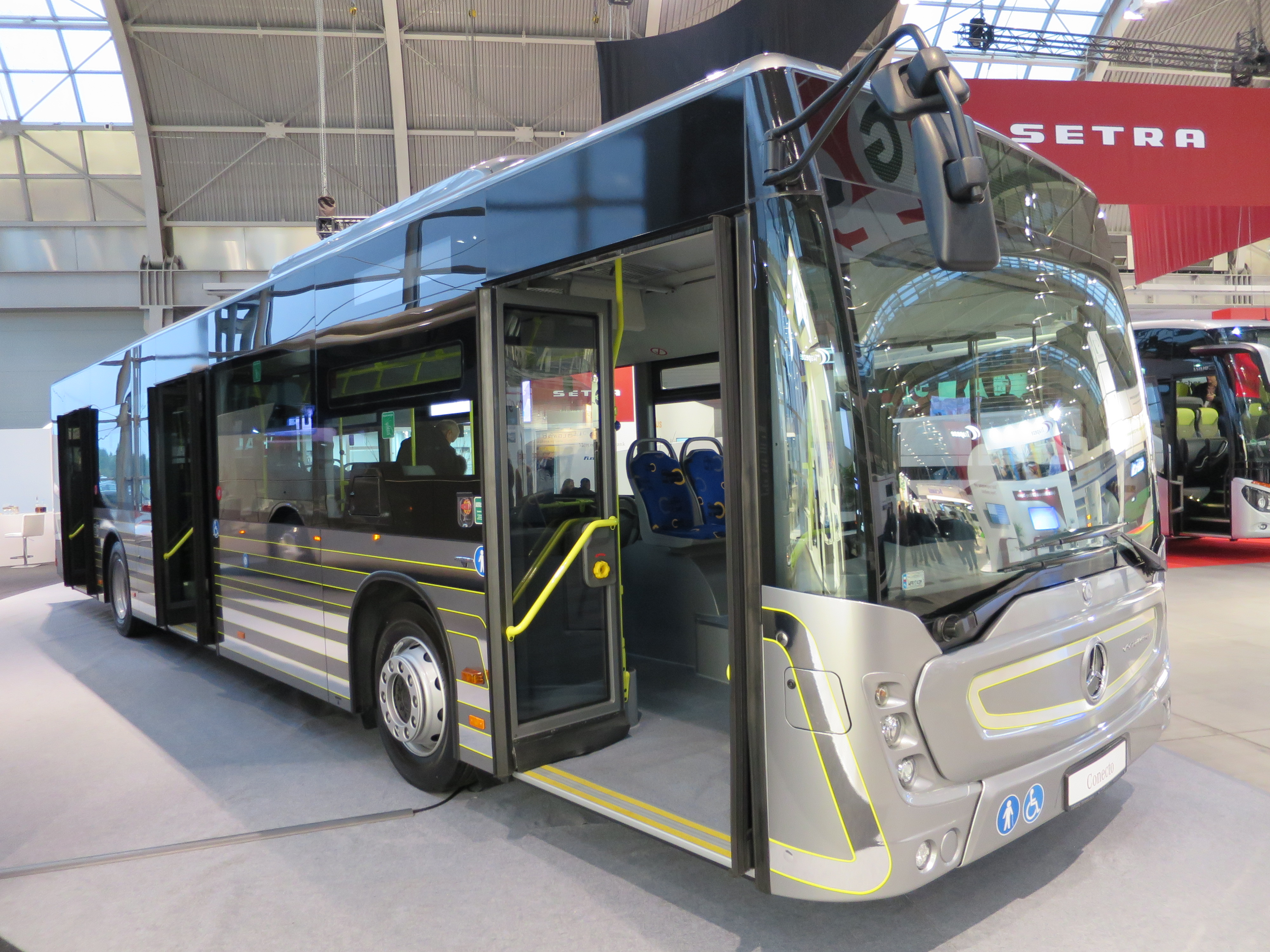
Conecto 3rd generation at TransExpo 2016

Also in 2007, the 2nd generation Conecto was presented and is both available as standard 12m and articulated 18m version. They are however only available with 3 doors (solo version) and 4 doors (articulated version). Unlike its predecessor as an independent model series (a step-entrance bus derived from O405, model designation O345), it is a technically simplified version of Citaro or Citaro G, with low floor configuration and vertical engines. It is recognizable with the changed exterior design and small differences in interior's design in opposition to Citaro and is mainly sold in eastern Europe, the Middle East and west Asia. The 3rd generation is, since 2018, also sold in Italy (when low-floor Conecto was never officially sold before).

Like previous step-entrance Conecto models, the low-floor Conecto is also produced at Mercedes-Benz Türk factory in Istanbul, Turkey.

In September 2016, the 3rd generation Conecto was presented in Warsaw, Poland. Several improvements were done for the new Conecto, as well as driving safety, passenger comfort, handling and Euro 6 engines, while the operation costs still stay low. Examples for high standard of safety are Electronic Stability Program (ESP) on solo versions and Articulation Turntable Controller (ATC) on articulated versions. Conecto and Conecto G NGT powered by natural gas are also available for the first time. Like the 2nd generation, the 3rd generation Conecto is solely available with 3 doors (solo version) and 4 doors (articulated version). In 3rd generation Conecto, only Euro-VI-compliant engines are available (OM936 in 12 m, OM470 in 18 m and M936G in gas versions); the 2nd generation Conecto, with Euro-V-compliant engines (OM926LA in 12 m and OM457LA in 18 m models), continues to be marketed in certain non-EU developing markets in eastern Europe, the Middle East and west Asia, alongside the 3rd generation Conecto.

== Production ==
The Citaro is currently built in factories in Mannheim, Germany, and Ligny-en-Barrois, France. It was also built in Sámano in Spain.

The low-cost-variant Conecto is produced by Mercedes-Benz Türk A.Ş. in Hoşdere, Başakşehir, Istanbul, Turkey.

== Operators ==
=== Europe ===
==== Germany ====
In May 2018, the Berliner Verkehrsbetriebe (BVG) placed an order for a total of 950 new Citaros: 350 Citaros and 600 Citaro Gs, the first of which was delivered on 20 November 2018. Their engines all meet the Euro VI standard, have low fuel consumption and lower emissions. The BVG also placed a second order for 15 eCitaro, which were delivered in the first quarter of 2019.

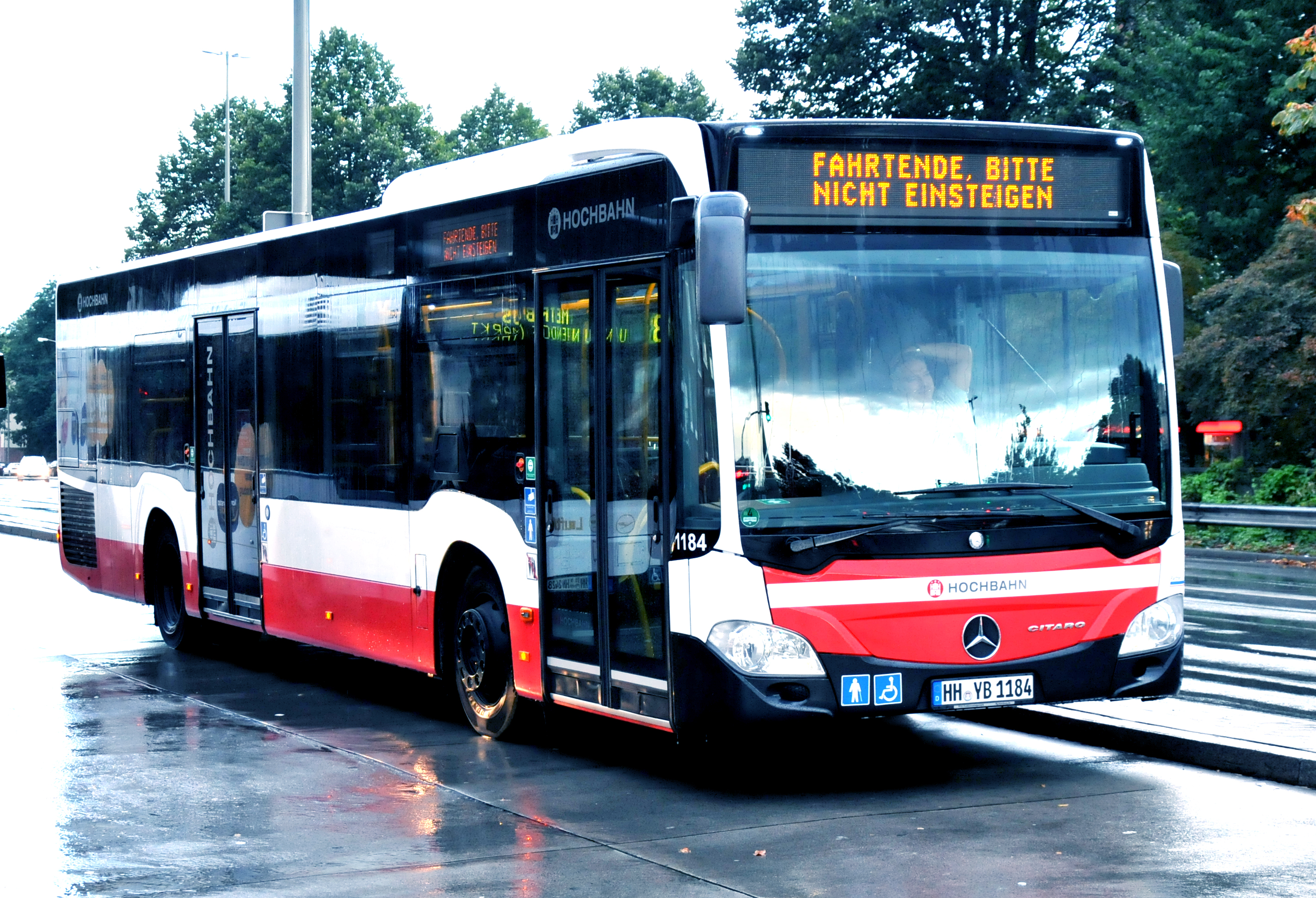
Citaro 2nd generation (Euro V) of Hamburger Hochbahn in Hamburg

The Mercedes-Benz Citaro is also widely used in the rest of Germany. The Hamburger Hochbahn has operated the Citaro since 1997 and has over time, ordered over 1000 in total. DB Stadtverkehr GmbH, a subsidiary of Deutsche Bahn, operates a number of Citaro or rather Citaro G. They are used in scheduled urban and interurban services in numerous federal states and cities, e.g. Aachen, Düsseldorf, Munich, Münster, and Stuttgart.

==== Austria ====
A Blaguss Citaro C2, operated on behalf of Wiener Linien, on the line 27A, in Vienna, Austria.

The Citaro lineup is also very popular in Austria and is used in many cities. There are extensive Citaro fleets in Vienna (134 Citaro L, 227 Citaro G, 62 CapaCity L, 30 eCitaro; augmented by additional Citaro variants operated by private operators such as: Gschwindl, Dr. Richard, Blaguss and Zuklinbus), Graz (174 vehicles of various variants), Linz (55 vehicles), among others.

==== Slovakia ====
In 2008 to 2013 Bratislava ordered 41 large buses of type Mercedes-Benz CapaCity to replace buses of types Ikarus 435 and Diesel buses Karosa B741. The first bus entered into service in December 2008 on route 96 with evidence number 1999. In 2010 ordered in total 25 buses and in 2012 ordered 15 buses. Bratislava also ordered a Citaro CNG with number 2020. Citaro CNG entered to service in November 2009 To February 2018 and today bus Citaro CNG is sold to private owner.

In 2002 Nitra ordered 1 Citaro only for route 28. Original transparents are being replaced in summer 2013 with R&G Mielec.

Public transport in Poprad operates 16 buses of versions C2 K (delivered in 1/22 – 12/22) 8pcs, O 530 2pcs, C2 6pcs delivered in (2020)

In 2022 Blaguss Slovakia purchased 5 buses from Wiener Linien for public transport in Ružomberok.

==== Hungary ====
In Hungary, VT-Arriva (now ArrivaBus Kft.) purchased 159 Citaro C2 EEV buses in 2013 to operate services in Budapest for Budapesti Közlekedési Központ (BKK), followed by two more Euro VI units the year after. After the expiry of the 8+2-year contract with BKK, most of these buses were retired and sold to other transport operators. These buses were replaced by 2-door solo and 3-door articulated MAN Lion's City buses. Some buses continued service with new license plates in Budapest under BKV Zrt., another BKK contractor. In 2025, ArrivaBus Kft. purchased 142 articulated Citaro C2 Euro VI-E buses. These will replace Arriva's existing Conecto series buses. In the same year, BKV Zrt. purchased 65 Citaro K Euro VI-E buses under a contract with Truck-Trailer & Parts Kft.

==== The Netherlands ====
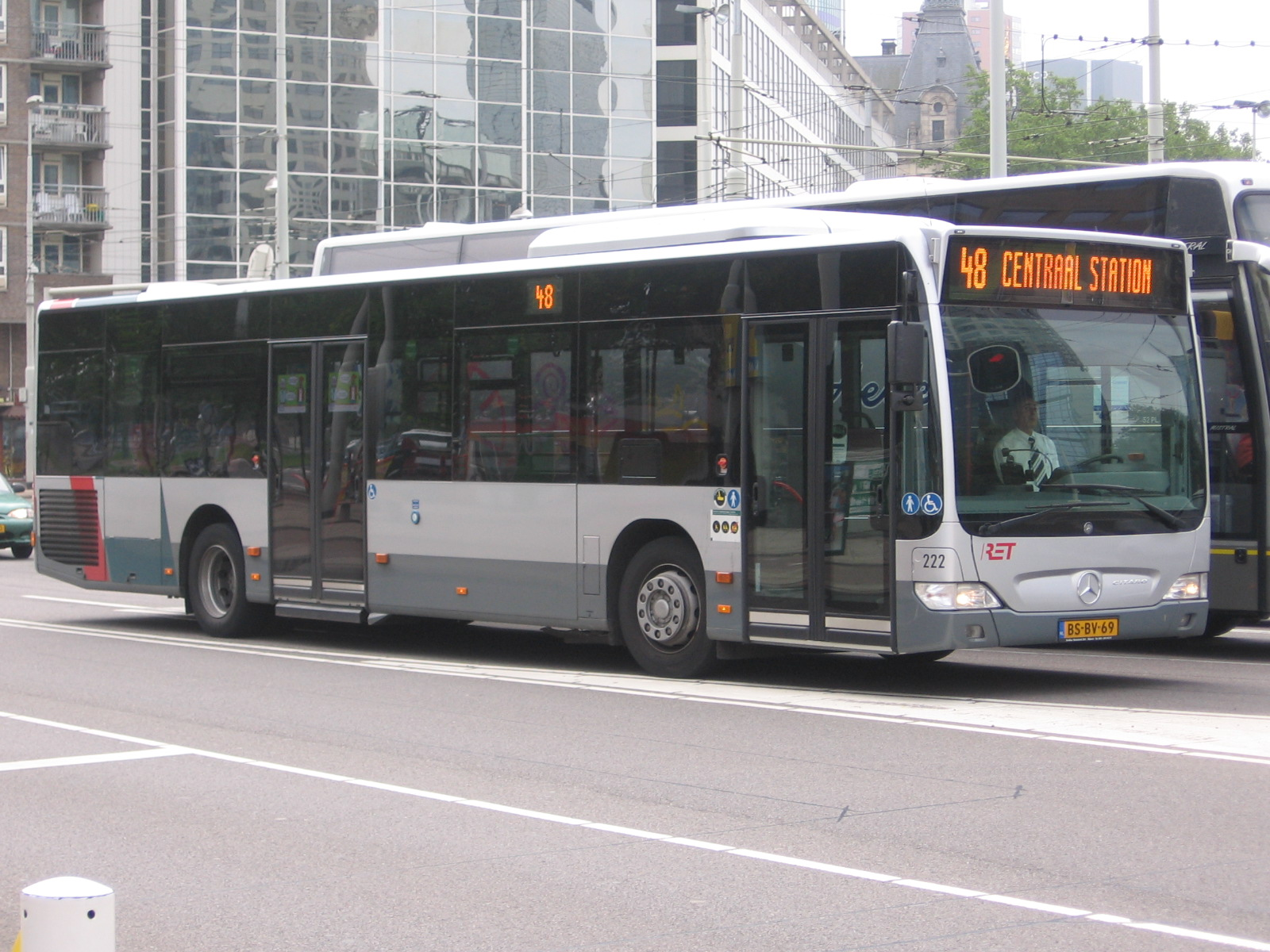
Citaro 1st generation facelift of RET

Connexxion had ordered a total of 255 buses throughout 1998 and 2014. That 255 contains the order of the 75 buses in 2019. Besides that they placed another order of 33 Capacity L buses.

The RET, from Rotterdam, has made 2 orders in 2006 and 2008 for a total of 166 Citaro buses. In 2010 they made another small order of 2 hybrid Citaro articulated buses.

Syntus, in the eastern side of the Netherlands, placed two orders for 33 buses. 11 Citaro CNG single buses under the moniker "Gelderland" and 22 articulated CNG buses under the moniker "Veluwelijn".

In 2009, Qbuzz ordered 390 while Connexxion ordered 75. As of 2018 Connexxion under the R-Net moniker took delivery of several CapaCity L models. In 2014 Qbuzz ordered another 138 buses for Utrecht under the moniker "U-OV."

==== Romania ====
Between 2005 and 2009 Regia Autonomă de Transport București (now called STB) purchased 1,000 Citaros, 500 Euro 3 first model and 500 Euro 4 from the Mercedes-Benz Citaro facelift.

In September 2019, STB ordered 130 Citaro Hybrid buses with deliveries to begin in the spring of 2020.

Citaro C2 Hybrid buses can also be seen in Brașov operated by RATBV.

==== Spain ====
In 2016, Empresa Municipal de Transportes de Madrid (EMT Madrid) ordered 82 natural gas versions of the Citaro, known as the Citaro NGT. The following year, it placed an order for a further 314 buses, and in 2018 it placed another order for a further 276 buses, for a total of 672 buses, all of which are due to enter service by 2020.

==== Portugal ====
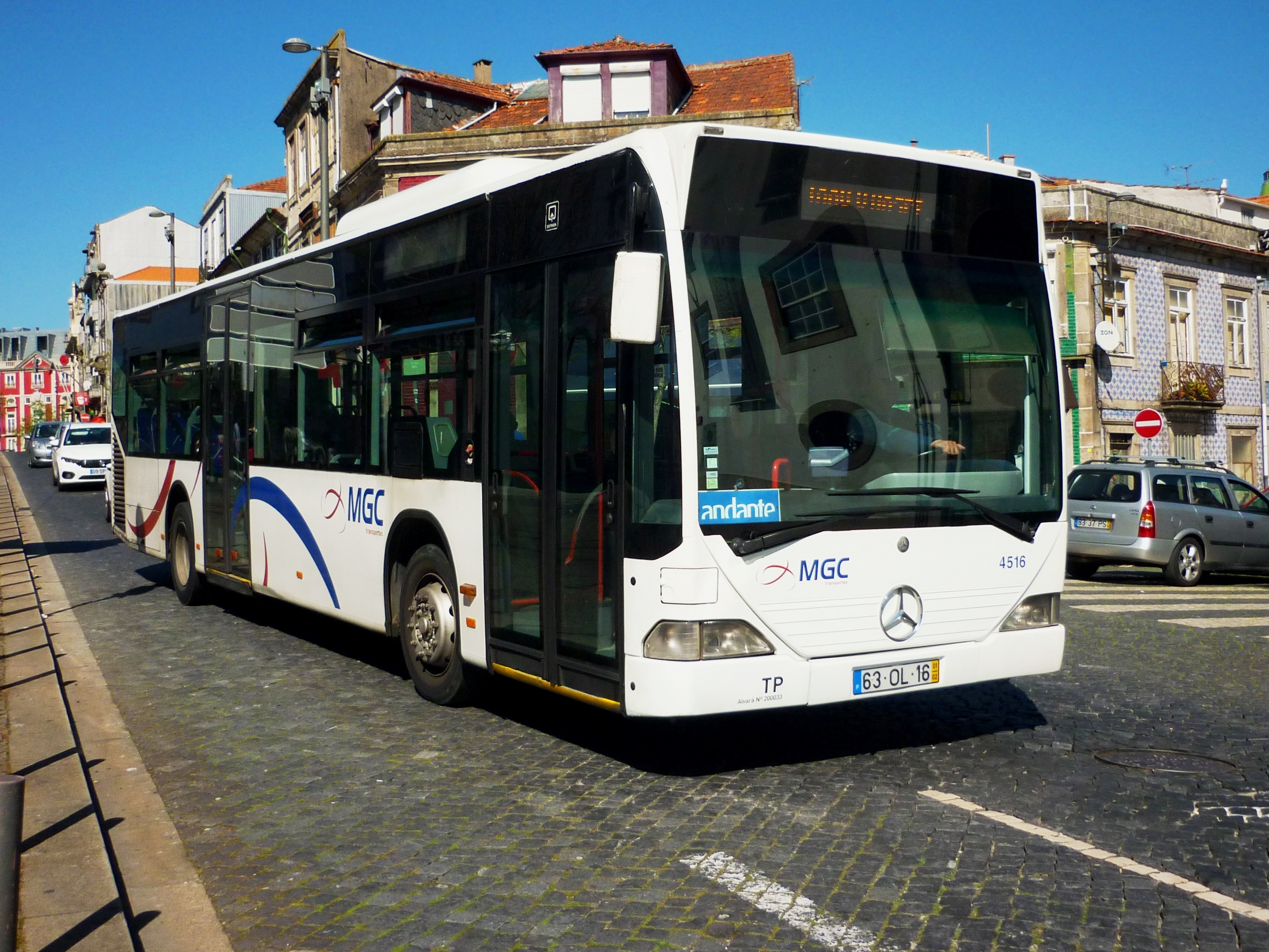
Mercedes-Benz Citaro 1st generation Porto, Portugal

In 2000, Companhia de Carris de Ferro de Lisboa (CCFL) acquired 39 diesel variants of the Citaro, with 3 doors, ZF 5HP502 and OM457hla chassis and, later that year, Sociedade de Transportes Colectivos do Porto (STCP) bought 75 bodywork-based Citaros, with Salvador Caetano CityGold bodywork, OM906hla chassis and Voith D851.3 gearbox, the only series in the world with a 3-speed gearbox. Afterwards, Transportes Colectivos do Barreiro (TCB) and Serviços Municipalizados dos Transportes Urbanos de Coimbra (SMTUC) purchased (since 2001) this model, the case of the first one between the Euro 2, Euro 3, Euro 4 and the Facelift versions, and the second company just the Euro 2 and Euro 3 variants. Both companies also acquired used Citaros, with TCB purchasing four ex-De Lijn vehicles with Euro 3 and SMTUC with a 1997 ex-Hochbahn Citaro (previously owned by Linhares, and also the first used Citaro to Portugal), four ex-Nobina with 3-door and anti-fire system (one already out due to fire) and one with vertical engine, originally a temporary bus, but since 2021 as theirs. In 2022, three Citaro Facelift, originated from TCB after staying out of service for a few years, along with five Volvo B7RLE with Marcopolo Viale Midi buses, both vehicle types from 2009, were purchased for additional service in Coimbra. These vehicles were bought with money originally used to buy a private vehicle for the city council, and they came in a very good condition, although their Voith gearbox have their reatrders always set off, since TCB did disable those on their buses with Voith. Besides the ex-Hochbahn Citaro in Linhares, Rodoviária de Lisboa purchased the Uberland variant of the Citaro, being the second vehicle as second hand purchase.

In 2004, STCP tested three Citaro Fuel Cell models for two years, part of the CUTE project for the hydrogen tests through some European countries. Along with those, three Euro 3 Citaros were offered to the company to complement the Fuel Cell tests. One of the hydrogen buses is saved as part of a possible museum (this one has its engine removed) and two of the Citaros are still in circulation (one of them was burned down caused by the engine in December 2016). Since 2008, CCFL purchased the articulated variant of the Citaro Facelift (Citaro G) in two gearbox segments: Voith Diwa 5 and ZF EcoLife. These ones allowed to replace the older Volvo B10M articulated buses from 1991 through 1993 (20 at 2008 and 30 at 2010). In 2010, Empresa de Transportes Gondomarense bought five Citaro K (midi variant) for bus lines with small numbers of passengers. Since then, various Citaro models were second hand buses from Spain and Germany, mostly. In 2018, part of the PO-SEUR project from the Portuguese Government, CCFL acquired 40 Citaro C2G NGT (natural gas) buses to replace the 1995 and 1997 Volvo B10M articulated buses, along with 125 CaetanoBus bodied MAN 18.310 CNG. Besides these ones, Scotturb also acquired 1+20 Citaro K, 10 of them are hybrid, for the Circuito da Pena line. This is also from the time when second hand Citaro C2 are put in circulation, like in Rodoviária de Lisboa having 2013 C2 ex-Dr. Richard, from Vienna. In 2022, Área Metropolitana de Lisboa (AML) offered 633 Conectos, 157 Intouros and 50 Citaros (all with Euro 6 engines and Voith Diwa 6 gearbox). Maia transportes, an operator based in Portuguese city, Maia, in Porto, also bought some citaros second handed from Germany. Maia transportes also has 2 ex-Rodoviaria de Lisboa Citaro's Ü.

Malta

In 2011, Arriva Malta received 81 ex-London Citaro C1 for service on busy urban routes and semi-express routes, these only ran for just about two years though, as the Government of Malta instructed the then operator to retire the bendy buses from service. In early 2015, the new operator Malta Public Transport loaned 25 ex-Heathrow airside Citaro C1 facelifts for use as city buses from Dawson Group. In early 2020, these buses were taken out of service due to demanded fleet reduction because of the COVID-19 pandemic. Nowadays, ten of these buses are being used as driver trainers, some returned to the UK, and others are being used as school buses in Cyprus.

==== Italy ====
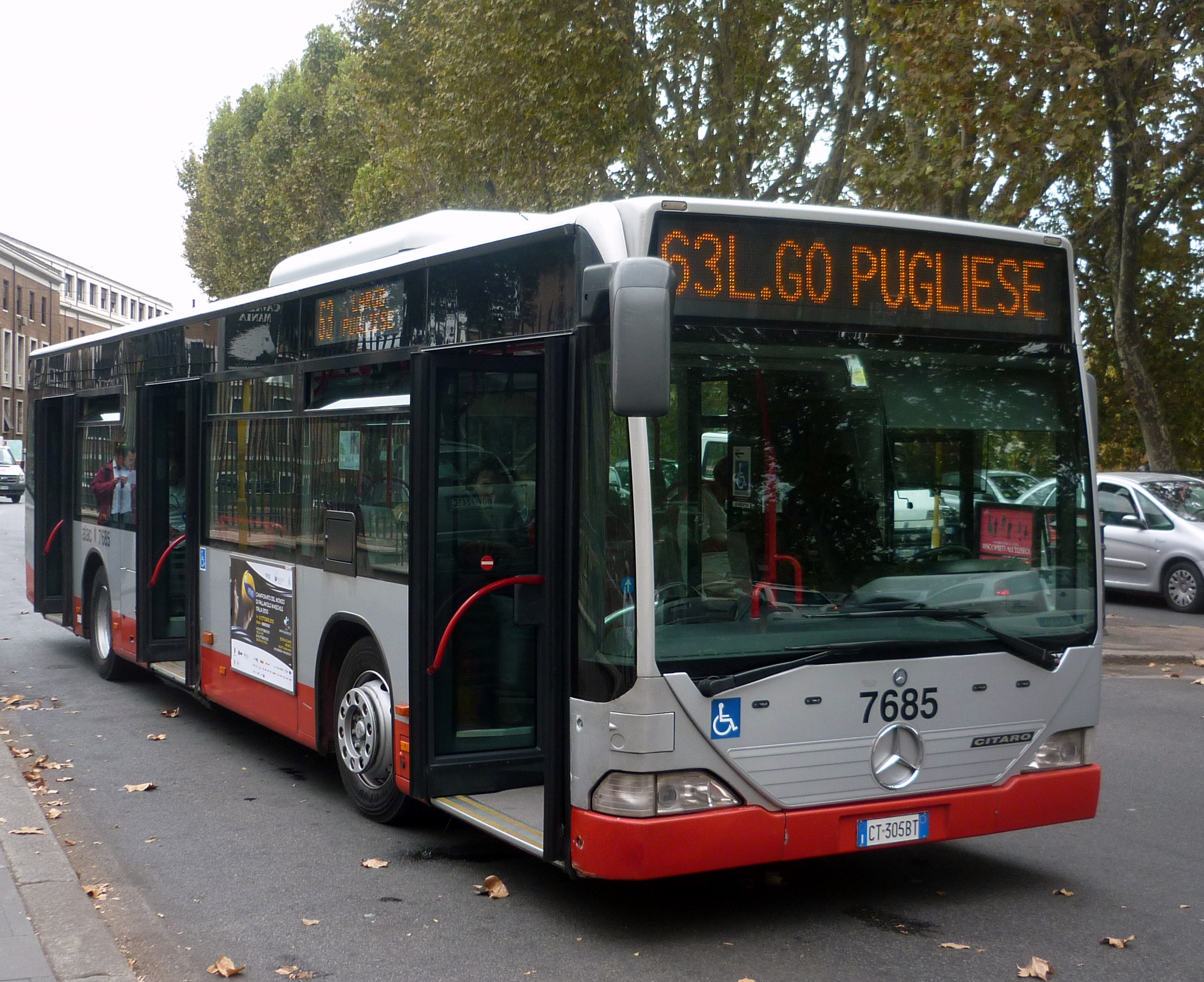
Citaro 1st generation in Rome, Italy operated by ATAC

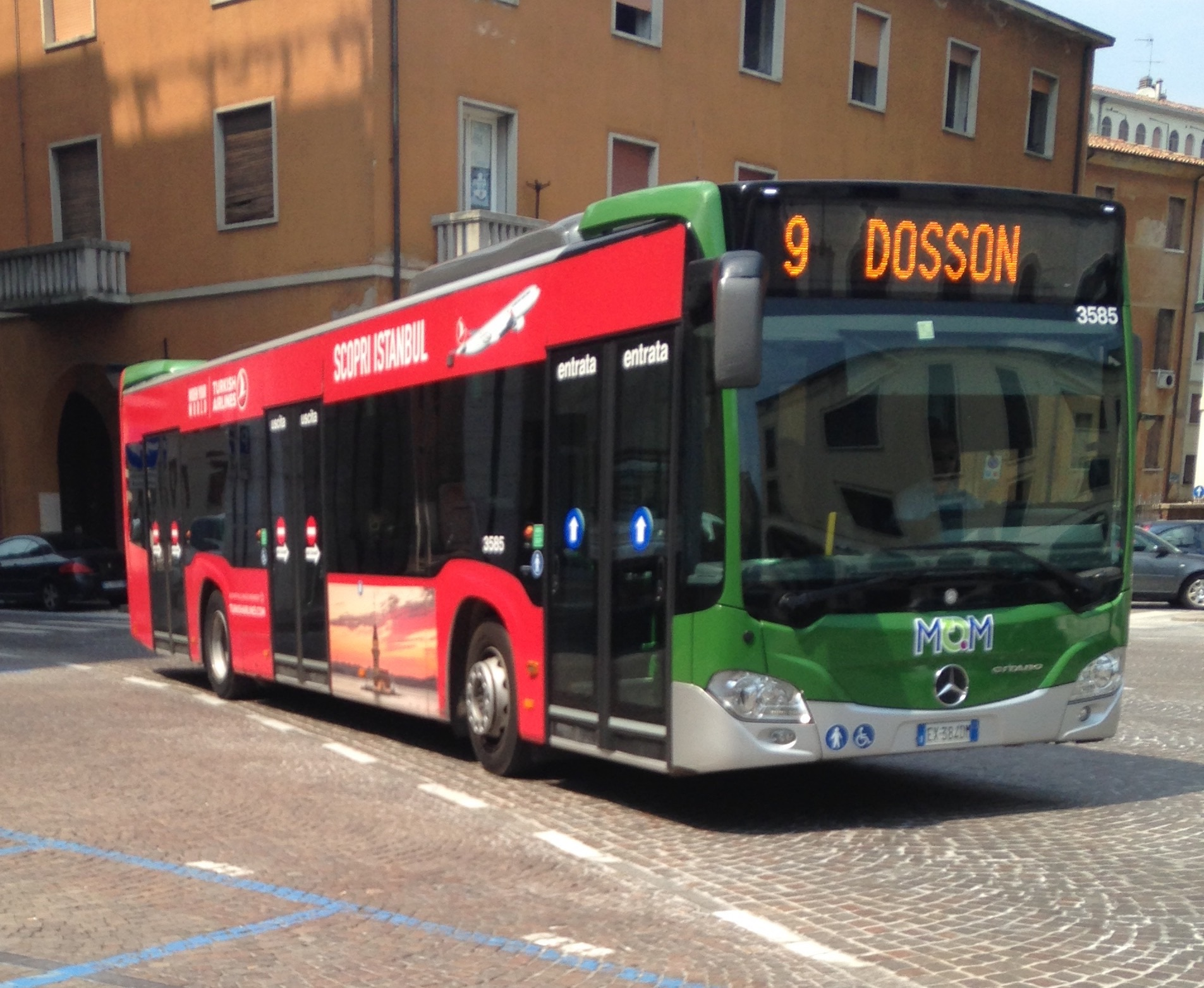
Citaro C2 operated by MOM in Treviso, Italy.

In 2001, ATAC of Rome ordered 183 Citaro MU interurban model with a blue livery and two doors. This was followed by 301 Citaros urban and suburban model in the normal ATAC grey livery with 2 and 3 doors, in 2004. They operate on many routes, including 63, 88, 98, 443, 559, 775 and 881 and many lines around Ostia. ATAC have also introduced 100 new Citaro C2 Hybrid 12m buses entering service in June 2021.

Outside of the capital, ATM of Milan took a delivery of 112 Citaro G articulated buses (in late 2008). These are fleet numbered 2901-2984 (4 door model) and 1300-1327 (3 door model) and are mainly seen on routes 70, 73, 94 (2900–2984), 727 and 729 (1300–1327). This was followed by a batch of 2 Citaro G Hybrid in 2011 (2590 and 2591), only allocated to route 94, as well as 3 Citaro Hydrogen 12m in 2012 (2000 to 2002), allocated to route 84. More Citaros (C2 Hybrid 12m) are currently being delivered to Milan.

In 2008, ANM of Naples took delivery of 44 gas powered Citaro Facelift CNG 12m TPLITALIA.IT. These currently run on routes R2 and 151, but can often be seen on other routes operated from the Via delle Puglie depot (such as 601 and R5). Previously, some of these were branded for the ALIBUS route (Airport to City Centre) route until late 2018, when they got displaced by a new fleet of MenariniBus Citymood 10m buses. The buses were supplied by a regional order by Campania which included a total of 58 buses being ordered. The other 14 went to BusItalia of Salerno (at the time CSTP), fleet numbered CITA01-CITA14 TPLITALIA.IT. Once again by a regional order, a further 20 Citaro K Euro 6 were delivered to Naples, fleet numbered N201 to N220.

Citaros are also operated in Venice (ACTV), Trieste (Trieste Trasporti), Cagliari (CTM and ARST) and Bologna (TPER), among other cities. Some of these companies also run Citaro U interurban buses.

==== Greece ====
In 2007, Thessaloniki local bus operator OASTH introduced 28 Citaro G buses, with 14 more coming in 2012. In 2009, a 12-meter Citaro was ordered for the cultural route of Thessaloniki. It is equipped with screens that display information about landmarks and comes with a microphone for the tour guide to speak. The citaro is also widely used in other cities of Greece. From 2020 to 2023 both Athens and Thessaloniki have rented used Citaro buses from PAPADAKIS BROS S.A. that were previously owned by several European bus operators including Connexxion, Qbuzz, BVG and more.

==== United Kingdom ====
===== London =====
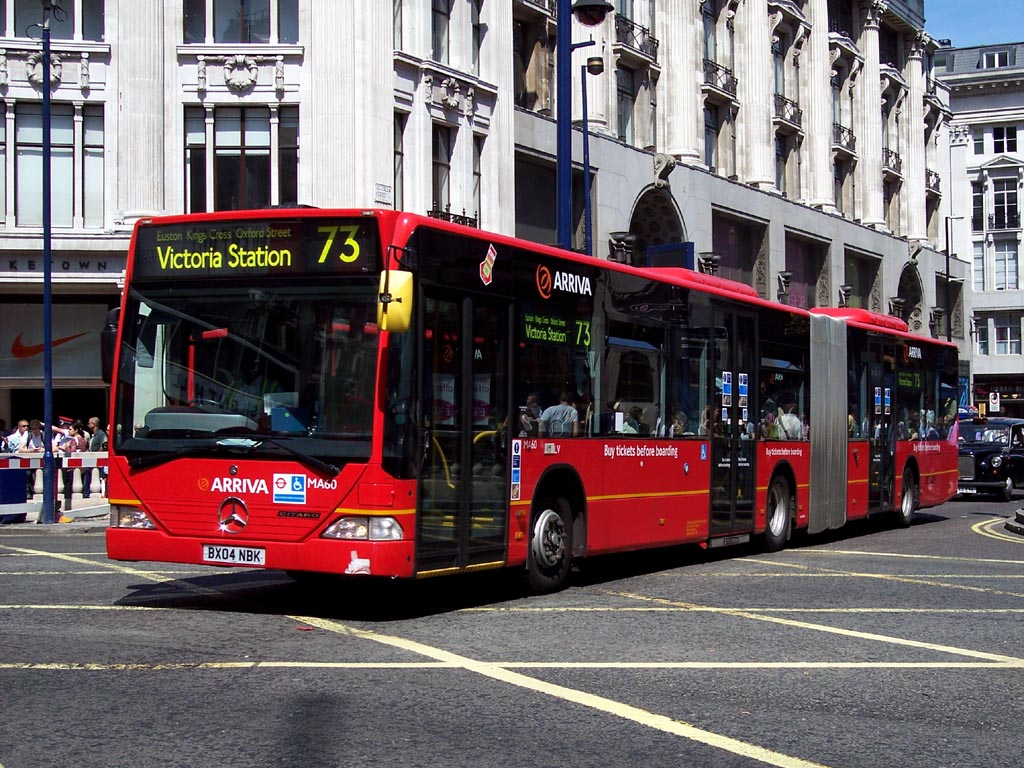
Arriva London Mercedes-Benz Citaro O530G on route 73 at Oxford Circus in June 2006

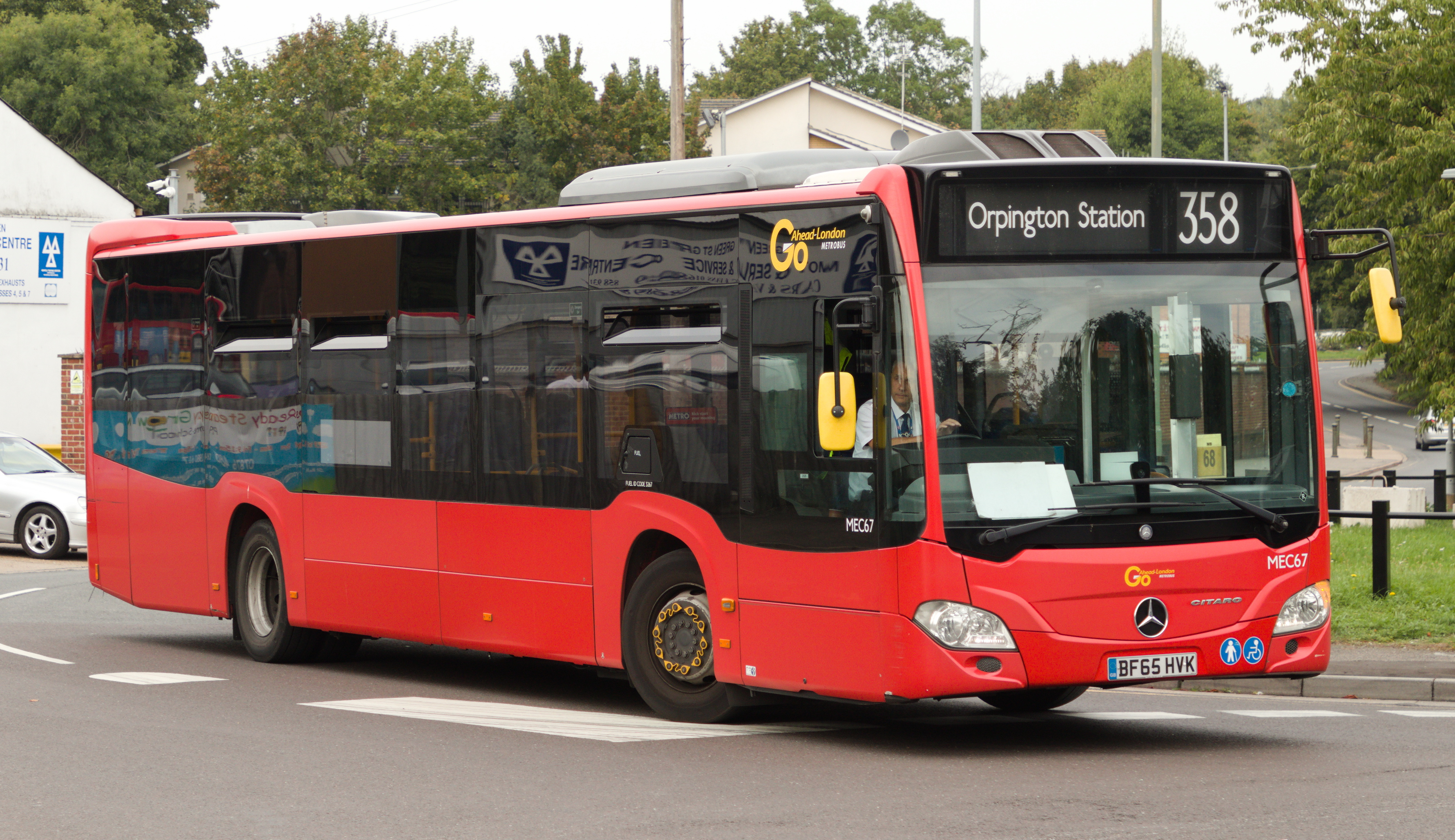
A Go-Ahead London Citaro C2 on route 358 in September 2020

Right-hand drive versions of the articulated Citaro G were introduced in London on 2 June 2002, on routes 507 and 521. They were eventually used on 12 routes across London, and were operated by various Transport for London operators including East London, First London, London Central, London General and Selkent.

In 2003 and 2004, four Citaro Gs caught fire, although there were no casualties involved. One was burnt on its delivery journey. Mercedes-Benz did address the problem, though the buses were withdrawn for some time which the saw the brief return of the just-retired AEC Routemasters. Unfortunately, the fires are said to have marred the reputation of articulated buses in the United Kingdom, and some people nicknaming them Chariots of Fire. The final Citaro G in London was withdrawn in December 2011. Eighty-one of Arriva London's examples were exported for use with Arriva Malta.

The first Citaros in London were 12 rigids introduced by First London on 27 April 2002 on route RV1. Others purchasers of rigids were London General for routes 507 and 521 in 2008, and Quality Line for routes X26 in 2011 and 413 in 2016.

===== Rest of the UK =====
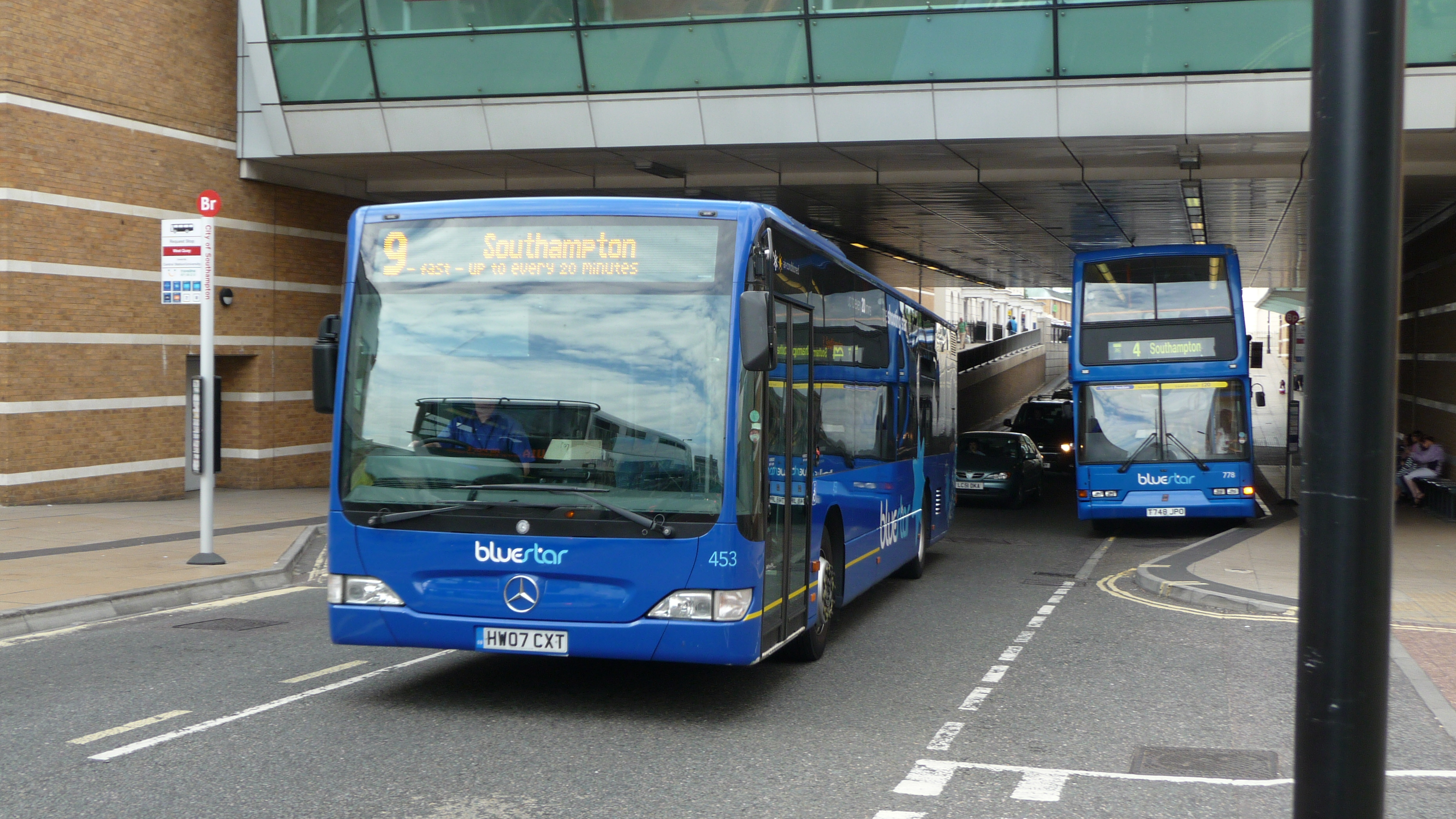
Bluestar Mercedes-Benz Citaro O530 on the Bluestar 9 in 2010

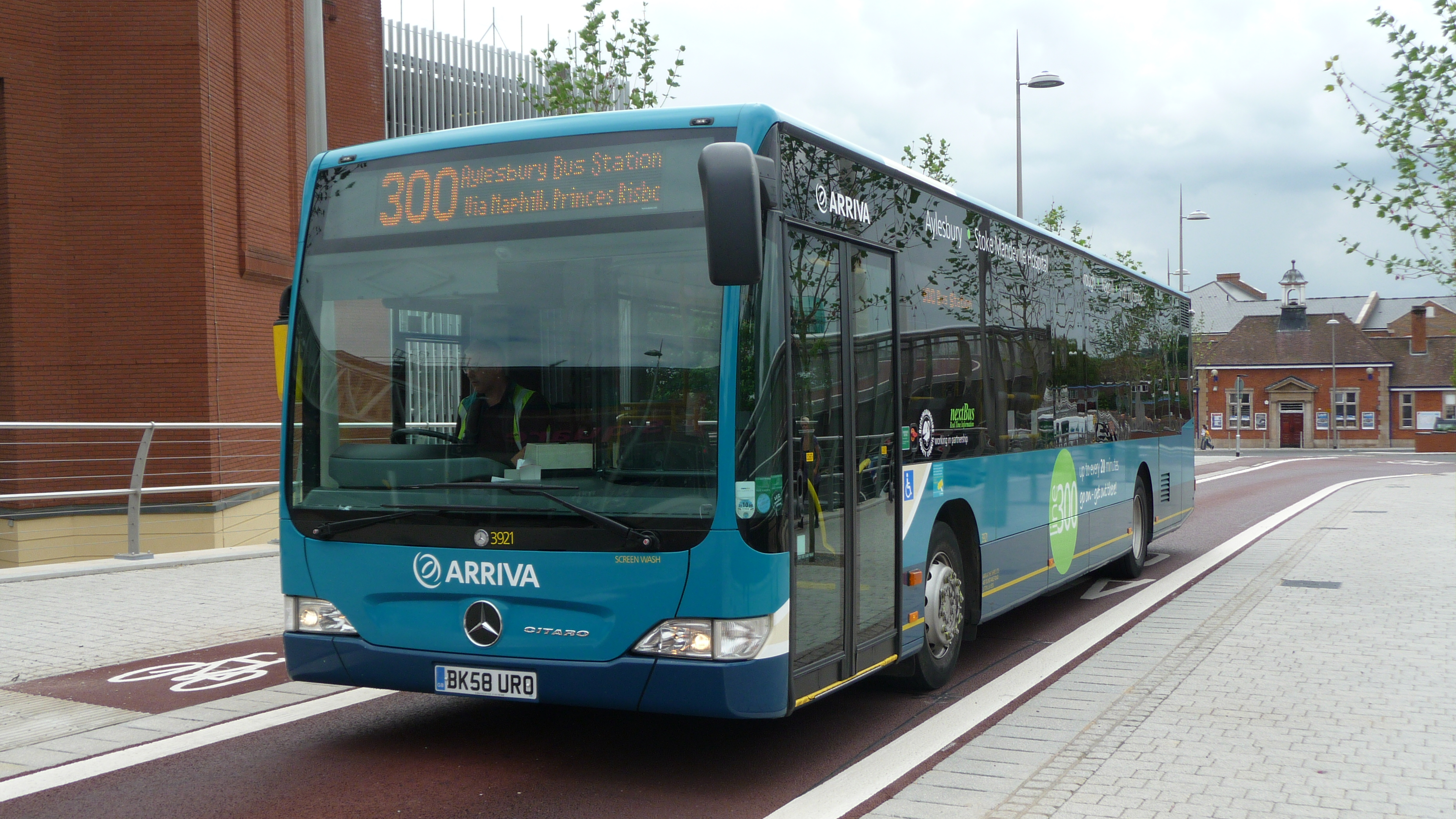
Arriva Shires & Essex Citaro O530 1st generation facelift in Aylesbury in July 2009

Many of the former London Citaro Gs saw further service with various Arriva, FirstGroup, Go-Ahead Group, National Express and Stagecoach Group fleets outside of London.

In 2008, First York purchased 15 Citaro Gs for its York Park & Ride operation. In 2015 Blackpool Transport received 10 Citaros for use on Palladium branded routes. In 2015 Cardiff Bus received 20 Citaros.

In 2025, Transdev in Yorkshire bought 16 Citaro Hybrids, 12 branded for Flyer services between Leeds Bradford Airport, Harrogate and Bradford with 4 in plain grey wrapped in Transdev decals. These replaced the previous Optare Versas which have been sold on for further use.

==== France ====
The RATP Bus Network of Paris operates 426 Citaros of which 349 are standard, 12m length and the other 77 are 18m length articulated buses.

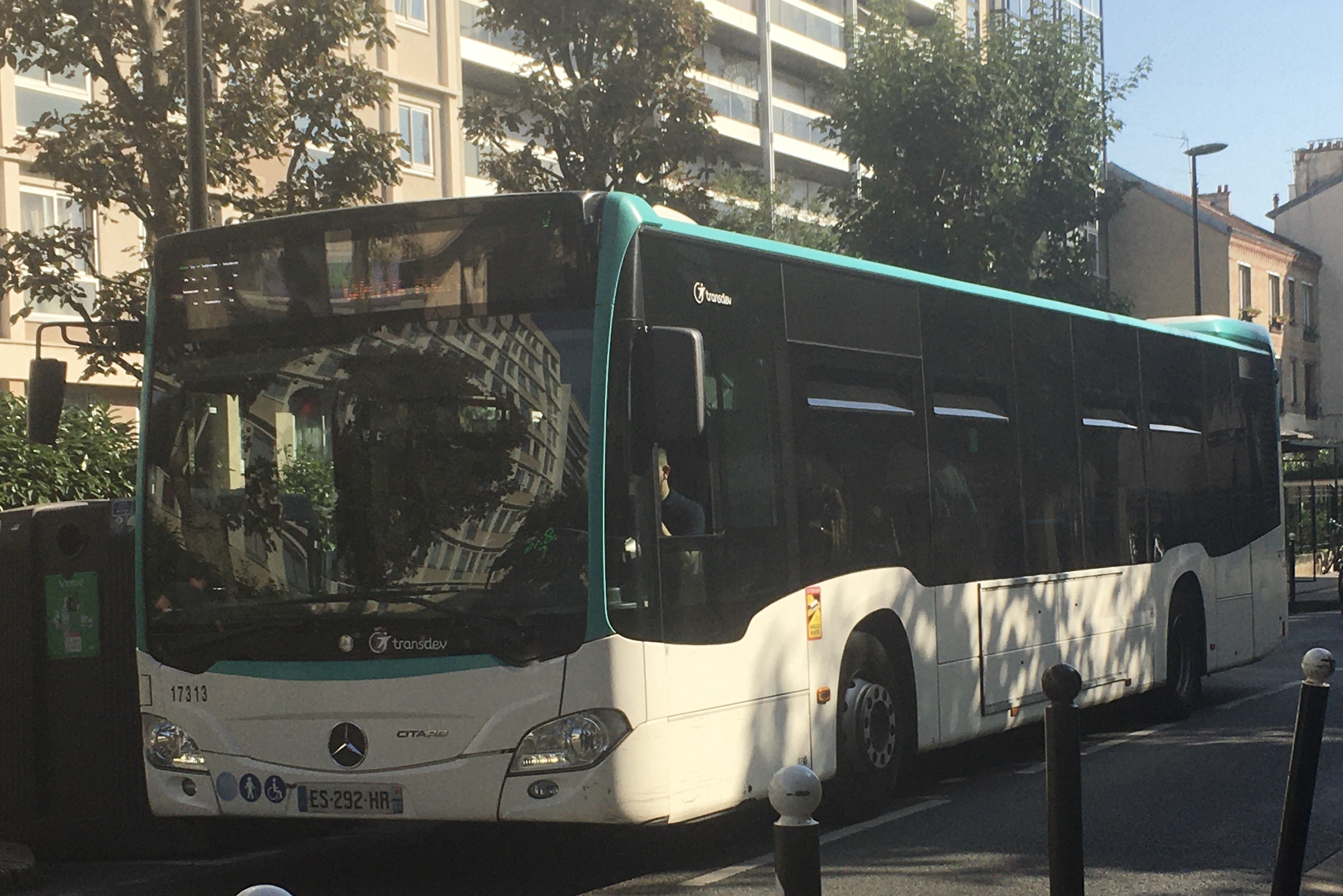
Mercedes-Benz Citaro C2 on RATP line 467 , near Rue de Sèvres, Boulogne-Billancourt

=== Asia ===
==== China ====
In 2006, three hydrogen fuel cell-powered Citaros began trial operations in Beijing, China. They ran on an 18.2 km (11.3 mi) long circular line, which contains 11 stations and uses Summer Palace North Gate as departure/terminal station. The operating hours ranged from 9am to 3pm with a frequency of every 40 minutes. During the trial, these Citaros left a very positive impression on passengers.

==== Japan ====
In 2010, Keisei Bus ordered 15 articulated O530G Citaro G buses, primarily for service in east Tokyo.

Nishitetsu also operates several O530G Citaro G buses on the Fukuoka BRT.

==== Singapore ====
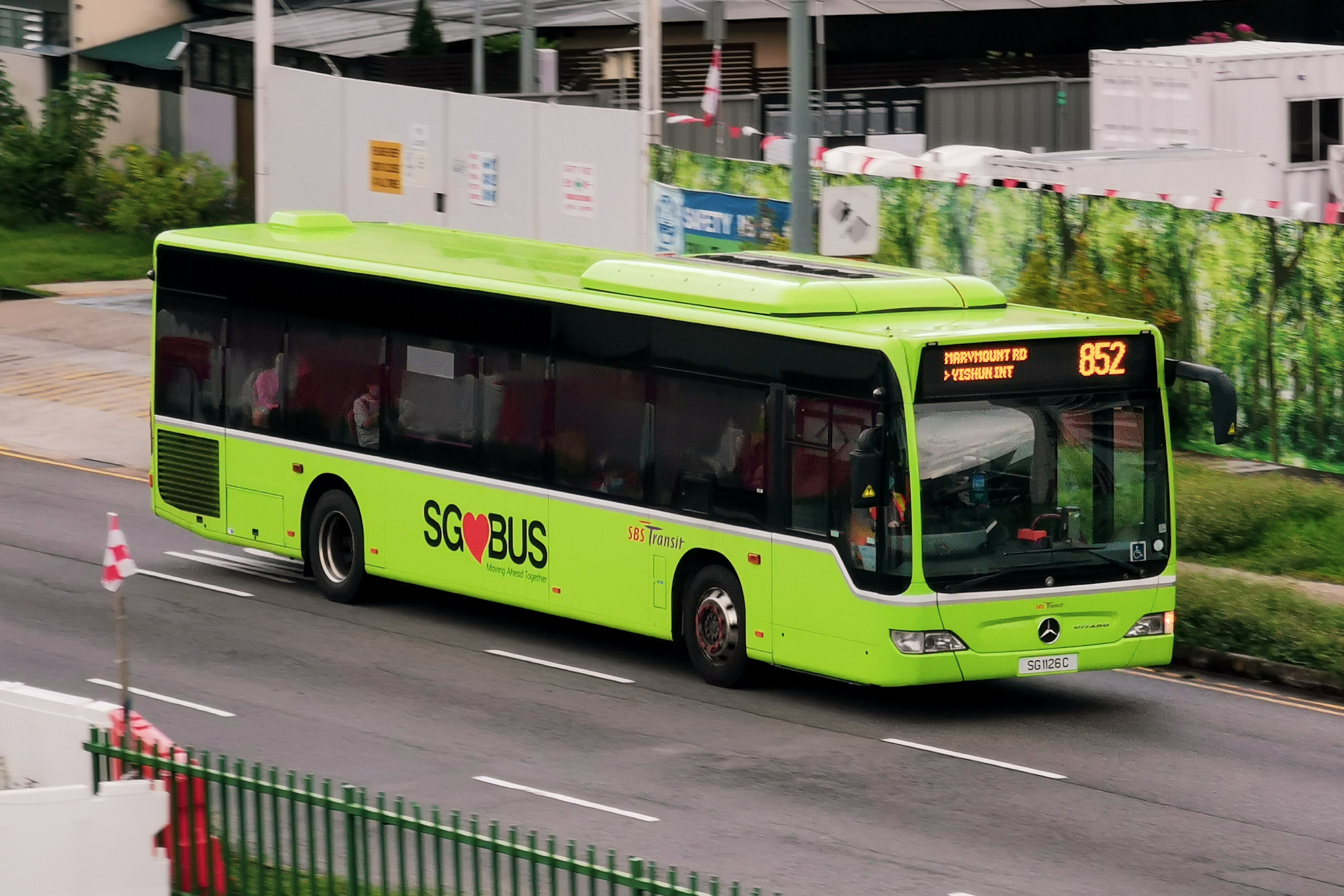
SBS Transit Mercedes-Benz O530 Citaro (SG1126C) on Service 852, leased under the Land Transport Authority's Bus Contracting Model (BCM)

SMRT Buses trialled a Euro V demonstrator unit in 2010 after it was purchased in January 2009, which proved to be successful. The trial bus was registered SMB136C and kept by SMRT after the trial concluded. An additional 10 buses were purchased in December 2009 with a follow-up order of another 40 in July 2010.

In 2010, SBS Transit had made an initial purchase of 300 buses to replace several of the remaining Volvo B10M Mark 3, as well as a few Volvo B10M Mark 4 (Duple Metsec and Walter Alexander Strider). Additional orders were being made to replace all Volvo B10Ms, with another order of 450 (increased to 474) in 2012 and a further 250 (increased to 330) in 2014. SBS Transit technical and interior specifications are quite different from that of SMRT Buses.

By 2017, a grand total of 1,155 Mercedes-Benz O530 Citaro buses have been registered under SBS Transit, SMRT Buses, and through the Land Transport Authority’s Bus Service Enhancement Programme (BSEP) and Bus Contracting Model (BCM). These public buses (including SMRT Buses) are built to SBS Transit specifications. All buses powered with Mercedes-Benz OM906hLA engine (6,374cc), coupled with a 4-speed Voith DIWA 854.5 automatic transmission. While Batch 1 Citaros are fitted with ZF Ecolife 6AP 1200B 6-speed automatic gearbox.

In 2022, SBS Transit had redeployed several MAN (A22) buses and Mercedes-Benz O530 Citaro buses to replace Scania K230UB buses on routes that run across the border between Singapore and Malaysia.

In March 2020, SBS Transit introduced a Mercedes-Benz O530 Citaro C2 hybrid, registered SG4004B as part of the 1-year trial and transition to sustainable transport. It features a Mercedes-Benz OM936h engine (7,700cc), paired with Voith DIWA 854.6 4-speed automatic gearbox, Bluetec Selective catalytic reduction (with Exhaust gas recirculation), common rail fuel injection system. It was deployed only on buses 93 and 272. After trials, the bus was returned to Cycle & Carriage and sent to the United Kingdom with Daimler Buses in December 2023.

=== Oceania ===
==== Australia ====
In Australia, between September 2004 and September 2007, Transperth trialled three hydrogen powered O530BZs. One was preserved by the Bus Preservation Society of Western Australia with the other two scrapped at the end of the trial. In 2016, Brisbane Transport trialled a Citaro demonstrator.

=== Middle East ===
==== Saudi Arabia ====
The Saudi Public Transport Company (SAPTCO), in a joint venture with RATP Group, placed an order for 200 Citaros and 400 Citaro Gs on 16 May 2017. These Citaros are specially adapted for use in the hot desert conditions of Saudi Arabia, with an uprated air conditioning system, circulating air blowers in the doors and double-glazed, darkened side windows. The first vehicles were due for delivery in 2018.

==== United Arab Emirates ====
By 2009, 180 Citaros had been delivered to the city of Al Ain.

=== North America ===
==== United States ====
In 2008, the MTA of New York City trialled a Citaro G Facelift bendy bus.

=== Latin America ===
In Latin America, Citaros are not present in large quantities in public transport systems.

==== Chile ====
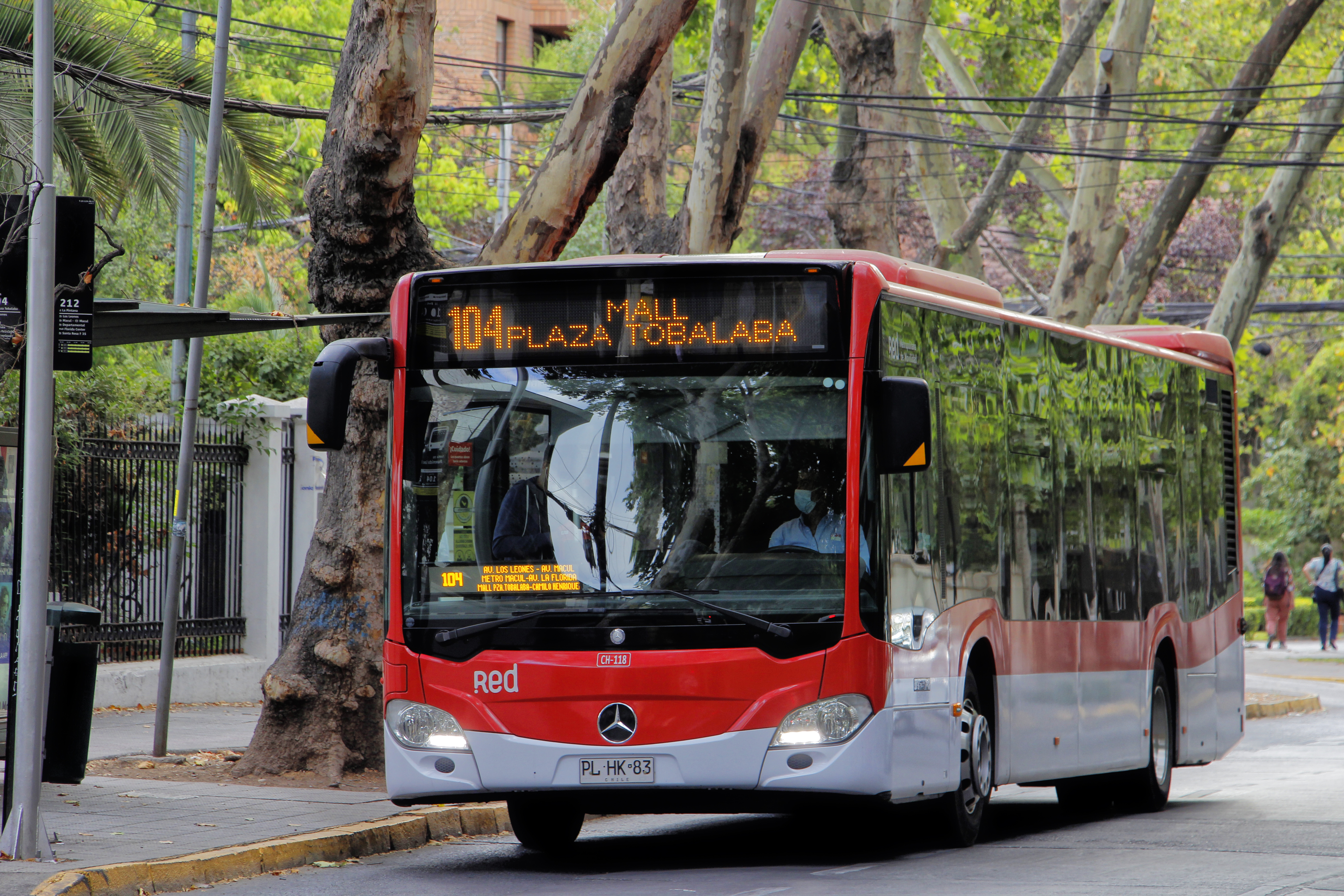
Mercedes-Benz Citaro operating in Santiago de Chile

Currently in Santiago, Chile, operates a single bus on line 104 of Red Metropolitana de Movilidad since 2020.

==== Mexico ====
Mexico City has 14 Spanish-built Citaros for the BRT Internal System of UNAM.
