= Makkink =

Makkink is a Dutch surname that may refer to the following people:

- Bruce Makkink, South African lawn bowler
- Herman Makkink (1937–2013), Dutch sculptor, graphic artist and illustrator
- Rianne Makkink (born 1964), Dutch architect, founder of Studio Makkink & Bey
