= Kortrijk Xpo =

Belgian indoor arena and convention center

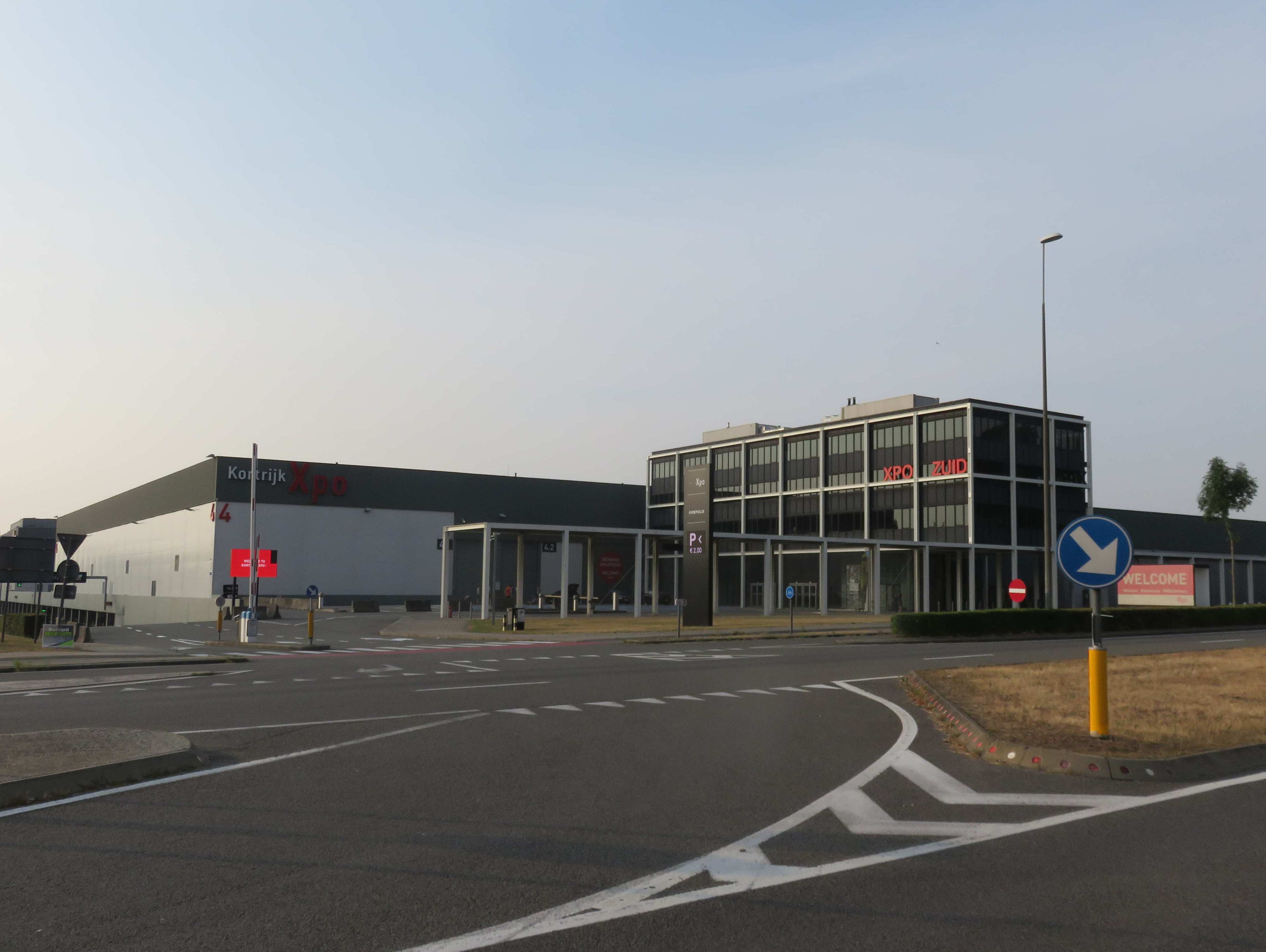
- Kortrijk Xpo in 2022
- Interactive map of Kortrijk Xpo
- Former names: Kortrijk Halls (1967–1999)
- Location: Kortrijk, Belgium
- Coordinates: 50°48′26″N 3°16′41″E

Construction
- Built: 1966–1967
- Opened: April 1967
- Expanded: 2005, 2009

Website
- Official website

Kortrijk Xpo is one of the largest multi-purpose indoor arenas and convention centres in the Benelux, containing 55,000 square metres (590,000 sq ft) of indoor space. The complex is situated in the city of Kortrijk, Belgium and is home to internationally renowned fairs, including the Kortrijk design fair Interieur and Busworld.

== History ==
The City of Kortrijk initiated the construction of the first exposition halls in 1966 in Kortrijk-South (Kortrijk-Zuid), close to the highway exit of the planned E3, the current E17. The Kortrijk Halls were officially inaugurated in April 1967. As a result of the more international approach of the exhibition centre, on 2 December 1999, the name was transformed into Kortrijk Xpo.

The complex covered some 6,000 square metres (65,000 sq ft) of exposition space and 2,500 square metres (27,000 sq ft) of meeting space at the beginning, the complex was later enlarged to 32,500 square metres (350,000 sq ft), to 37,200 square metres (400,000 sq ft) in 2005, and As of 2009 covers 55,000 square metres (590,000 sq ft). This makes the complex one of the biggest fair centres in the BENELUX and even Europe. A new multipurpose hall, 'XXL' was added in 2009.

== Fairs ==
The following trade fairs are held in Kortrijk:

- International Design Fair Interieur
- Busworld
- Euro Dogg Show
- Classics
- Kortrijk Winter Carnival
- Millionaires Fair
- Sea Side Show
- Hairstyle Benelux
- Architect@Work

== Accessibility ==
The Kortrijk Xpo complex can be reached by the Highway E17, exit 2, and the ringroad R8.

The city bus network (operated by De Lijn) ensures a direct connection with the Kortrijk main railway station. Lines 1, 12 and 13 are directly linked with Kortrijk Xpo.
