= Studio Makkink & Bey =

Makkink & Bey is an architecture and design practice based in Rotterdam and also in the Noordoostpolder. The studio, founded in 2002, is led by architect Rianne Makkink and designer Jurgen Bey, and works in various domains of applied arts including public space projects, product design, architecture and exhibition design.

Rianne Makkink and Jurgen Bey are both Art Directors of the brand Prooff, established in 2006. Bey teaches at the Royal College of Art, London, and since 2010 he is the director of the Sandberg Institute, Amsterdam. Makkink teaches at the architecture department of Ghent University, and is a tutor at the Design Academy Eindhoven.

== Awards ==
- 2009 – Nomination for the Rotterdam Design Prize, for Prooff Lab
- 2008 – Awarded with Woonbeurspin 2008, for collected works
- 2007 – Nomination for the Rotterdam Design Prize, for best studio
- 2005 – Prins Bernard Cultuurfonds Award, for collected works
- 2005 – Harrie Tillie Award, Stedelijk museum, Roermond, for collected works
- 2003 – Interior award 2003, Lensvelt / de Architect, for meeting room Interpolis
- 2003 – Nomination the Rotterdam Design Prize, for LinnenkasThuis
- 2003 – Elle Deco Award Lighting and Accessories, for Light Shade Shade
