= Bus Reshaping Plan =

The Bus Reshaping Plan of 1966 was a plan devised by the London Transport Board for the reorganisation of bus routes in London, England. The main features of the plan, which was to be rolled out over ten to fifteen years, were:

- Introduction of one man operation (OMO) to address staff shortages and costs
- Introduction of flat fare routes centred on outer hubs
- A shortening of routes to improve reliability and ease scheduling
- Long single deckers in place of double-deckers

The plan began to be implemented in September 1968, but immediately proved problematic: the public disliked the changes, the new vehicles - "Merlin"s - were found to be unsuitable, and it was difficult to find available land for the proposed suburban transport interchanges. By 1973 the plan had effectively been abandoned, with a decision to retain crew operation and to dispose of the Merlins.

== Background ==
=== Chambers Report ===
By the early 1950s, the London Transport Executive was experiencing difficulty in providing bus services in the capital. The reliability of services was declining as an increase in private motor traffic was causing congestion. At the same time, industrial relations in the organisation were poor, and the retention and recruitment of staff was difficult. The issue of London's public transport had become one of interest to national politicians, and two committees of inquiry had been appointed to investigate the matter. The Chambers Committee, chaired by S P Chambers, deputy chairman of ICI was appointed by the Minister of Transport and Civil Aviation, Alan Lennox-Boyd in April 1953. The emphasis of the committee's work was to find ways of reducing costs "with a view to ascertaining what practical measures can be taken... in order to secure greater efficiency or economy". The committee delivered its report in February 1955, and recommended only limited changes to bus services. The London Transport Executive had forcefully made the case for the wholesale introduction of one man operation, but the committee rejected this option. Indeed, they felt that it would be impractical in much of central London, and would in fact lead to serious delays and a reduction in service efficiency. Instead they suggested that only some routes in the Country Area should be converted to OMO. Flat Fares were also examined, but were felt to be inappropriate in most areas of London. One idea explored by the committee was the "Wheel Plan", suggested by the Greater London Chambers of Commerce. This would divide bus services in London into two groups: radial services in the suburbs, terminating at the edge of the central area; and a separate system of central London bus routes. Passengers moving from the radial services to the central routes would be required to change buses at a number of interchanges at the edge of the central area. The committee found that the Wheel Plan did not reflect the actual traffic patterns, and that it would cause unnecessary hardship and expense to passengers. One innovation that the committee did suggest was the provision of special services in peak hours where there were very heavy traffic flows such as to and from the mainline railway termini. Dedicated "standee" vehicles would be used, which would have a much higher passenger capacity than conventional seated buses.

The Chambers Committee had no powers to compel the London Transport Executive to carry out their recommendations, while the Transport and General Workers Union refused to co-operate. Instead, management attempted to press ahead with conversion of routes to driver-only operation. This met with little success, and in spite of the union recommending acceptance of the changes in exchange for a bonus scheme, it was rejected by the membership in 1959.

=== Phelps Brown Report ===
By the early 1960s, the problems of the previous decade of traffic congestion and recruitment difficulties had intensified. In late 1962 the LTE ordered 33 front entrance Leyland Atlanteans suitable for one man operation. In addition, 6 standee buses were ordered for an experimental central area service as recommended by the Chambers Committee. On 1 January 1963, the London Transport Board replaced the executive, and entered negotiations with the unions to introduce a programme of service reforms. The union countered by submitting a claim for increased pay and a reduced working week, and by October 1963 had instituted a ban on overtime and rest day working. In November 1963, in an attempt to break the deadlock, the Minister of Labour, Joseph Godber, announced that Professor Henry Phelps Brown of the London School of Economics would head a commission of inquiry. The commission's terms of reference allowed them to review the pay and conditions of bus drivers and conductors in light of manpower requirements and working and operating conditions in London traffic. In making their report they were to pay "due regard to the possibilities of increasing the efficiency of London Transport's road services". The committee made an interim report on 12 December recommending new rates of pay, which was rapidly implemented, leading to the ending of the overtime ban. The final report of the committee was issued in April 1964. The report led to an agreement for:

1. The operation of larger buses with more seats, with experimental introduction of front entrance vehicles
2. Extension of one man operation to suburban areas, and conversion of some country double deck routes to OMO using front entrance buses
3. Introduction of standee services as recommended by the Chambers Committee, with flat fares and automatic fare collecting equipment

Following the agreement, the board brought small numbers of front entrance Daimler Fleetlines (XF Class) and Leyland Atlanteans (XA class) with the intention of carrying out trials of one man operation.

=== Red Arrow 500 ===
On 18 April 1966, the first central area "standee" was introduced. "Red Arrow" Service 500 was a Monday-Friday service linking Victoria station to Park Lane in peak hours and to the shopping district of Oxford Street in off peak hours. In a break from tradition, the new buses were not designed specifically for London use, but were based on an existing manufacturer's model. The vehicles chosen were rear-engined 36 foot (11 m) long AEC Swifts, which London Transport christened Merlins. These wore a special red and flake grey livery, and had a standing area for 48 passengers and a raised seating area at the rear for 25 passengers. Passengers entered by the front doors, where there were twin coin-operated turnstiles (known as "passimeters"), with a flat fare of sixpence.

== The plan ==
Following the success of the first Red Arrow route, the board completed the drafting of the Reshaping Plan. It was launched by at a press conference on 14 September 1966 by Maurice Holmes, chairman of the London Transport Board. Describing the plan as a "drastic recasting" of bus services, Holmes explained that the new system could not be brought in "overnight", but would take between 10 and 15 years to complete. Anthony Bull, vice chairman of the board, explained that passengers would be able to buy books of tickets in advance. Purchasers of these "stored fares" would enjoy a substantial discount.

The six main proposals in the plan were:

1. Principal trunk routes from the suburbs to the centre were to remain operated by rear entrance double deck buses with open platforms and conductors in the medium term. A number of routes were to be shortened to counteract the effects of congestion, and thus improve control over running times.
2. Extension of the Red Arrow system of standee buses in the West End and City. A map of possible routes was produced.
3. About forty suburban centres were to have local flat fare networks of short-distance routes. These "satellite" routes were also to act as feeders to the Underground stations and trunk routes. They were to be operated by single deck buses.
4. Suburban routes not suitable for flat fare networks were to retain a "graduated" fare system. They would gradually be converted to one man operated single-deck buses.
5. Services in the country (green) area were to be largely unaffected, although OMO was to be introduced where practical.
6. Green Line Coaches were to continue to operate express services, which were to offer improved connections.

The board published an 18-page brochure explaining the plan, and giving the statistics behind it. This showed that 45.5% of journeys made were less than one mile, 32.2% were between 1 and 2 miles, 12.1% were between 2 and 3 miles, 5.1% were between 3 and 4 miles and 5.1% were of 4 miles and over. The document also identified the different types of journey made.

=== Suburban satellite routes ===
Early drafts of the plan identified 38 suburban hubs where flat fare networks could be established. A new system of numbering was to be used for the networks, with two prefix letters identifying the geographical location. The number of centres was reduced to 36 in the final plan by the exclusion of Barnet and East Ham. Each centre was allocated up to ten route numbers prefixed by a single letter.

- A1–A10: Waltham Cross
- B1–B10: Bromley
- B11–B20: Barking
- B21–B30: Brixton
- C1–C10: Croydon
- C11–C20: Camden Town
- C21–C30: Camberwell
- E1–E10: Ealing
- E11–E20: Enfield
- E21–E30: Edgware
- E31–E40: Eltham
- E41–E50: Edmonton
- F–F10: Walthamstow
- G1–G10: Golders Green
- H1–H10: Harrow
- H11–H20: Hackney
- H21–H30: Highgate
- H31–H40: Harlesden
- H41–H50: Hounslow
- K1–K10: Kingston
- L1–L10: Ilford
- L11–L20: Lewisham
- M1–M10: Morden
- P1–P10: Peckham
- P11–P20: Putney
- P31–P40: Poplar
- R1–R10: Romford
- R11–R20: Richmond
- S1–S10: Shepherd's Bush
- S11–S20: Stratford
- S21–S30: Sutton
- S31–S40: Streatham
- U1–U10: Uxbridge
- W1–W10: Wood Green
- W11–W20: Woolwich
- W21–W30: Wembley

== Preparation and delay ==
Following the publication of the plan, orders were made for the new buses. It was calculated that 450 new buses would be needed per annum. As there was insufficient time to design a bus specifically for London Transport, it was decided to standardise on the 36 foot (11 m) Merlin that had been used for the pioneer Red Arrow service. The long single deck vehicles were able to carry as many passengers as the 26 foot (7.9 m) long RT double deckers they were to replace. The buses for the satellite suburban services were fitted with automatic fare collecting equipment developed jointly by London Transport and Setright Registers. There were two consoles on each bus, situated between the front wheel arches. Although there were to be flat fares on the new routes the machines also had to allow for reduced child fares, and accepted 3d, 6d and one shilling coins. One of the two machines also had a slot to accept pre-paid tickets, although this facility was never used.

The initial order placed in 1966 was for 450 Merlins. They were for delivery in 1968, and were to be allocated as follows: 28 for Red Arrow routes, 253 for suburban flat fare networks, 75 for country town services and 94 for conventional OMO services. Negotiations with the unions began in 1967, while detailed planning of the first route changes was carried out. In July 1966, the government published a white paper (Transport Policy Cmnd.3057) outlining future legislation. The Transport Bill was finally introduced to the Commons late in 1967 and included two financial aids for bus operators: a 25% grant for the purchase of new buses suitable for OMO, and a 75% grant for new interchange infrastructure. Enacted as the Transport Act 1968, the legislation provided that only vehicles registered after 1 August 1968 would qualify for the "New Bus Grant". Accordingly, as the Merlins were delivered they were not placed into service, but into storage, mostly in the open air. The summer of 1968 was a wet one, and the prolonged storage of the buses was to lead to corrosion and problems with their electrical systems.

== Implementation 1968–1969 ==
=== September 1968 ===
The first phase of the plan came into effect on 7 September 1968 as follows:

- Seven additional Red Arrow services were introduced, numbered 501–507. They served Waterloo, Victoria, Liverpool Street, Charing Cross and Marylebone stations. The only mainline terminus not served was London Bridge, due to construction works and congestion in the area. A number of existing double deck routes which entered central London were shortened as a result.
- A flat fare "satellite" network of six routes (W1–W6) based on Wood Green, and the consequent withdrawal or shortening of conventional routes in the area.
- Recasting of services in the Walthamstow area, with the new Walthamstow Central station on the new Victoria line as the hub. Seven new routes were created, and 19 existing ones altered. Of the 45 new buses introduced to the area, 15 were flat fare "standees" and 30 were 50 seater OMO with graduated fares.
- There were also some changes to services in the Potters Bar, Hampstead, Richmond and Kingston areas using existing vehicles.

=== October 1968 ===
The second phase of reshaping was carried out on 26 October 1968, and affected a number of routes in south east London. A flat fare network serving Peckham (P1–P2) was introduced, and a number of existing routes were converted to OMO, and altered or shortened. Engineering works on the Blackwall Tunnel meant it was no longer accessible to double deckers, and Merlins were introduced as a consequence.

=== November 1968 ===
On 23 November Merlins were introduced to the country area for the first time, with routes 305 and 305A from Uxbridge, and 430 from Reigate converting to OMO. The country buses did not have turnstiles, but used "autofare" ticket machines, which issued tickets to different values. Five Green Line routes converted to OMO on the same date. On 30 November a flat fare network serving Ealing Broadway and Greenford (E1–E3) was introduced, while two north London routes (143 and 242) were converted to single deck OMO.

=== Review of plan ===
At the end of 1968, London Transport carried out a review of the changes that had been introduced. While the Red Arrow routes had proven a success, it was clear that the remaining service and vehicle alterations were extremely unpopular with the travelling public. Hundreds of complaints had been received, and it was discovered that in most cases punctuality and reliability had actually worsened on the converted routes. Peak hour services suffered badly, failing to meet scheduled journey times. This was due to two factors: increased passenger boarding times (due to unfamiliarity with the fare collection system), and traffic congestion (the length of the buses prevented them from pulling into bus stops, forcing them to block the road). Off-peak bus users (especially elderly passengers and those with children or shopping) on the suburban schemes also found the buses unsuitable due to the turnstiles. The complicated fare collection equipment chosen by the London Transport Board contrasted with the simpler systems successfully introduced by many bus operators outside the capital at the same time.

The experience of the 1968 changes led to some changes in vehicle orders for 1969. It was recognised that long single deckers had caused congestion, and that the flat fare system would not work in all cases. The inability of the passimeters to issue change also inconvenienced passengers. In order to address the first problem, a number of front entrance double deck Daimler Fleetlines were ordered. On some of the new routes "coarsened" rather than flat fares were to be introduced. The vehicles for these services were to have "split entrances", with two passenger streams. An illuminated screen displayed the various fares from the stop, while a central bar divided the entrance into two doorways. Passengers who had the correct change were to pass to the right and use the coin-operated entry gate, passengers who needed change were to use the left doorway and pay the driver.

=== February 1969 ===
More country area routes were converted to OMO on 15 February. These were in the Hemel Hempstead and Watford areas. On the same day the remaining single deck Green Line services also became one man operated.

=== March 1969 ===
15 March saw more Autofare Merlins introduced to the country area garages: Crawley, Dorking, Gravesend, Harlow and Windsor all received small numbers of the vehicle. A week later on 22 March a new Merlin-operated flat fare service (M1) was formed by the joining of parts of two existing services in the Morden area.

=== May 1969 ===
On 10 May, conventional route 212 serving Muswell Hill and Finsbury Park was replaced by a new Merlin flat fare route, W7, as part of the Wood Green network. Bromley-based route 138 was converted to conventional OMO on the same date.

=== June 1969 ===
On 14 June, route Route 20 in the Epping area was converted to Merlin OMO, at the same time absorbing route 20B. Alterations to the Red Arrow routes saw 505 rerouted and a new route 508 linking Marylebone Station with Central London was introduced. Three routes were converted to flat fare: 272 in the Stratford area became S1, Enfield route 128 became W8 and Harrow route 230 became H1.

=== August 1969 ===
On 23 August, the first "split entrance" Merlins entered service experimentally on routes 110 and 111 based at Hounslow garage. At the same time Airport Express A1, running non-stop from Hounslow West station to Heathrow Airport for a flat fare of one shilling, was introduced. Barnet route 84 and south east London route 122A converted to Merlin OMO.

=== September 1969 ===
With currency decimalisation due in February 1971, it became necessary to replace the coin machines on the Red Arrow fleet as they only accepted sixpence pieces. The Red Arrow fleet was completely replaced on the night of 19 September partly by new vehicles and partly by existing buses transferred from suburban routes, each being equipped with newer coin machines that could accept decimal coinage in addition to 3d and 6d coins.

=== October 1969 ===
With the opening of the third section of the Victoria line on 25 October, a number of services in Central London were altered. North London routes 79 and 79A converted to Merlin OMO. A number of country services became OMO on Sundays. On 27 October a Red Arrow 509 from Victoria to Kensington serving the museums of South Kensington.

=== November 1969 ===
The first double deck route to become OMO was Route 233 serving the Roundshaw Estate near Croydon. XA class Leyland Atlanteans were fitted with periscopes so that the driver could view the upper deck. The vehicles were fitted with Johnson fareboxes, a simpler system of fare collection than the autofare system fitted to the Merlins.

=== Problems with the Merlins ===
Apart from the electrical problems that afflicted the early Merlins, mechanical faults soon became apparent. Gearboxes, throttles and alternators all proved defective, while the 35 imperial gallons (160 L) fuel tanks were insufficient and buses sometimes ran out of fuel. The length of the chassis led to flexing and stress on the structure of the bodywork. The roof sections separated, the front domes became loose and cracks appeared around the windows, with windows occasionally falling out. Remedial work had to be carried out with strengthening straps and plates applied.

By March 1969, it had become clear that the Merlin was unsuited to use in London, and orders were placed for shorter (33 foot (10 m) long) single deck buses. These were again on AEC chassis, and London Transport adopted the Swift name for the shorter vehicles. The first batch of a new class of OMO double deck bus were also placed. These DMS double-deckers were originally dubbed Londoners by LT, a name that was quickly abandoned.

The final batch of Merlins were delivered in October 1969 bringing the total to 665, although they did not enter service until Spring 1970.

== 1970 – 1973: The Greater London Council and change of policy ==
On 1 January 1970, the Transport (London) Act 1969 came into effect. This replaced the London Transport Board with a London Transport Executive (LTE) under the financial control of the Greater London Council (GLC). London Transport's green-liveried country area bus services passed to a new company, London Country Bus Services, a subsidiary of the nationalised National Bus Company.

As the LTE took over the shorter Swift buses were in the course of delivery, with the first examples entering service on 24 January on routes 160 and 160A in the Eltham area replacing RT double-deckers. In spite of being shorter than the Merlins, the new vehicles were unable to a make a sharp left turn from Eltham Hill. The buses had to be diverted until Greenwich Council made alterations to the corner, leading to complaints from passengers. The buses were also too long to be turned at Lower Sydenham railway station, having instead to reverse to the stop.

=== Reversal of policy ===
More Swifts went into service in North West London in June 1970, displacing double-deck vehicles. By this time, it was necessary for the LTE to place orders for buses to be delivered in 1972. The Swifts had proved to be little better than the Merlins, and it was decided that all future deliveries were to be double-deck. The first of the DMS double deckers entered service on 2 January 1971, the first of a batch of 1600 delivered throughout 1971 and 1972.

In 1972, following reliability problems with services converted to OMO and flat fare, the LTE initiated a survey to examine the desirability of continuing the conversion programme on busy central London routes. The "Bus Operations Special Survey" or BOSS took six months to complete, and came to a clear conclusion that the busier routes could not practically be converted from crew operation. Boarding times would more than double, leading to longer journey times. This in turn would lead to loss of passenger traffic, necessitating an increase in the flat fare, leading to further loss of custom. Under the original reshaping plan, much of the AEC Routemaster fleet were due for withdrawal by 1975. It was now decided to continue their use indefinitely, and some of the new DMS double-deckers would now also be crew operated.

=== Disposal of the Merlins ===
By early 1973, the certificates of fitness of the 16 earliest Merlins were due to expire, requiring them to be overhauled. In the event only one (MBS 4) was completed, the overhaul taking 8 months to complete. Such was the cost of the refit, that it was decided to withdraw the remainder of the batch. In the meantime the Merlins had started to display serious mechanical problems, with oil spillage onto the roads leading to complaints from local authorities and the Metropolitan Police. In August 1973 the GLC gave the LTE permission to withdraw the Merlins five years early, and to replace them with new double-deckers.

== Postscript ==
After 1973 OMO was introduced to routes in a piecemeal fashion. By 1977 nearly all the Merlins had been withdrawn with the exception of the Red Arrow vehicles. In that year the LTE received sanction to replace them with Leyland Nationals. The next comprehensive plan for reforming London's bus services - "BusPlan 78" - was announced following the 1977 local elections, when the Conservative Party took control of the GLC.
