= Setright =

Setright may refer to:

- L. J. K. Setright (1931–2005), English motoring journalist and author
- Setright Machine, device for issuing bus tickets
