= London Buses route 507 =

Former London bus route

507
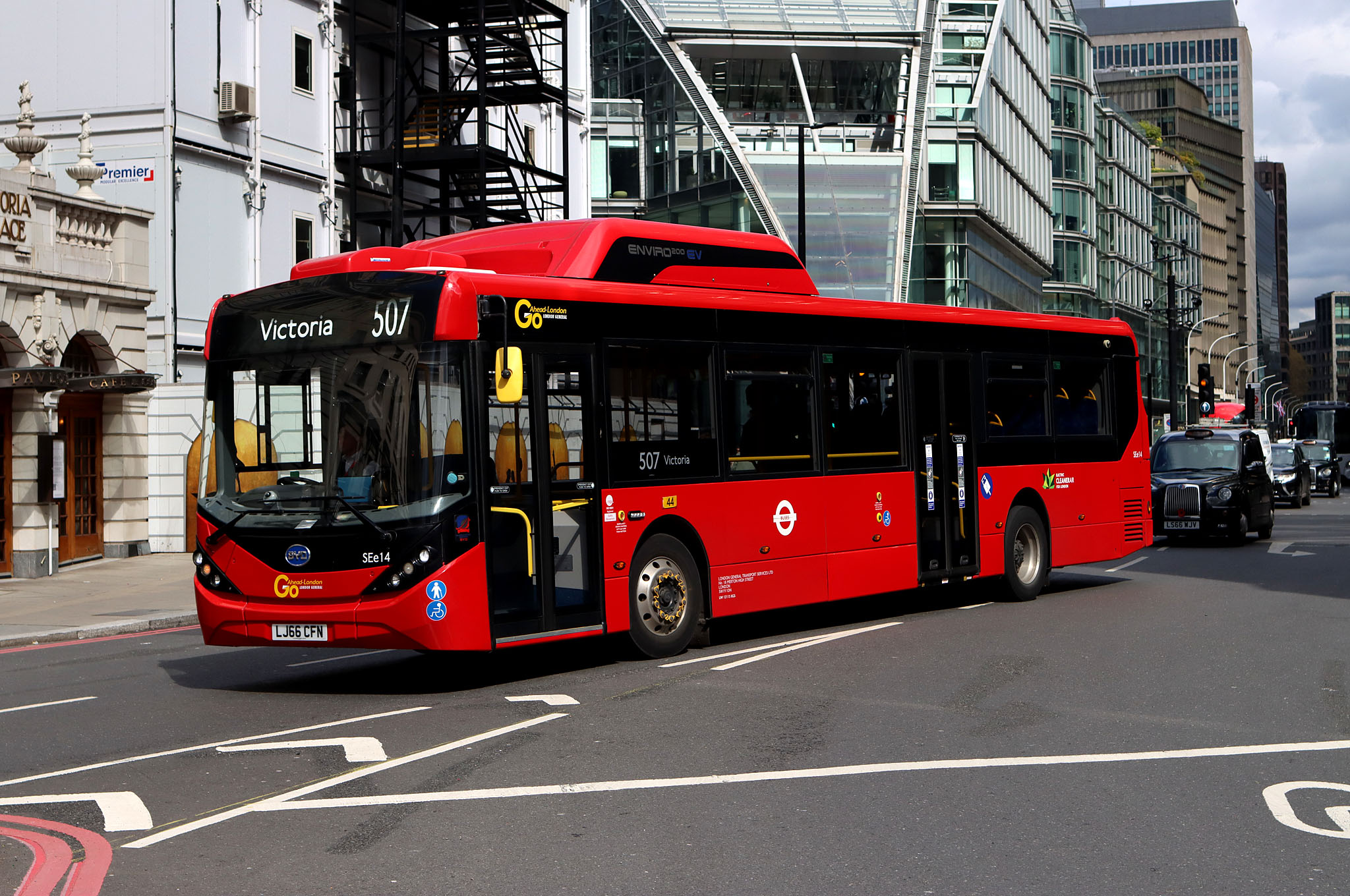
- London General BYD Alexander Dennis Enviro200EV at Victoria station in April 2023

Overview
- Operator: London General (Go-Ahead London)
- Garage: Waterloo
- Vehicle: BYD Alexander Dennis Enviro200EV
- Peak vehicle requirement: 9
- Status: Defunct
- Began service: 7 September 1968
- Ended service: 29 April 2023
- Predecessors: Route 46; Route 70
- Night-time: No night service

Route
- Start: Waterloo station
- Via: St Thomas' Hospital; Lambeth Bridge; Horseferry Road
- End: Victoria bus station
- Length: 2 miles (3.2 km)

Service
- Level: Daily
- Frequency: About every 6-12 minutes
- Journey time: 11-21 minutes
- Operates: 06:25 until 00:32

London Buses route 507 was a Transport for London contracted bus route in London, England. It ran between Waterloo station and Victoria bus station, and was operated by Go-Ahead London subsidiary London General.

It was also one of two Red Arrow branded services. In 2016, routes 507 and 521 became the first battery electric bus routes in Central London, and the second operated by Transport for London, after route 312.

== History ==
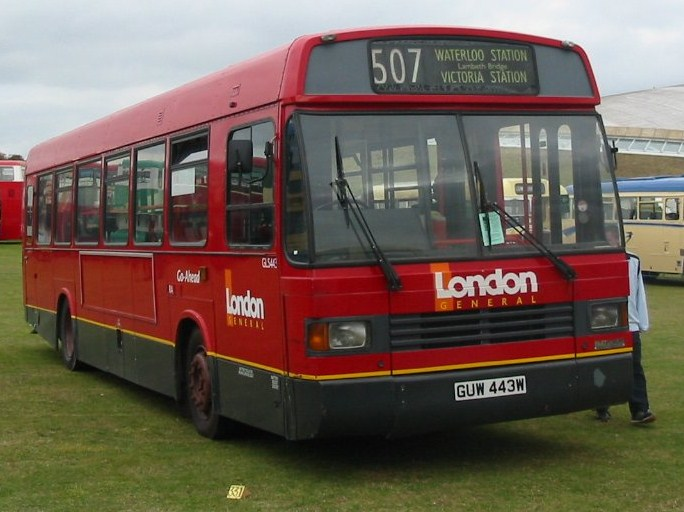
London General Leyland National Greenway as used on route 507 between 1992 and 2002

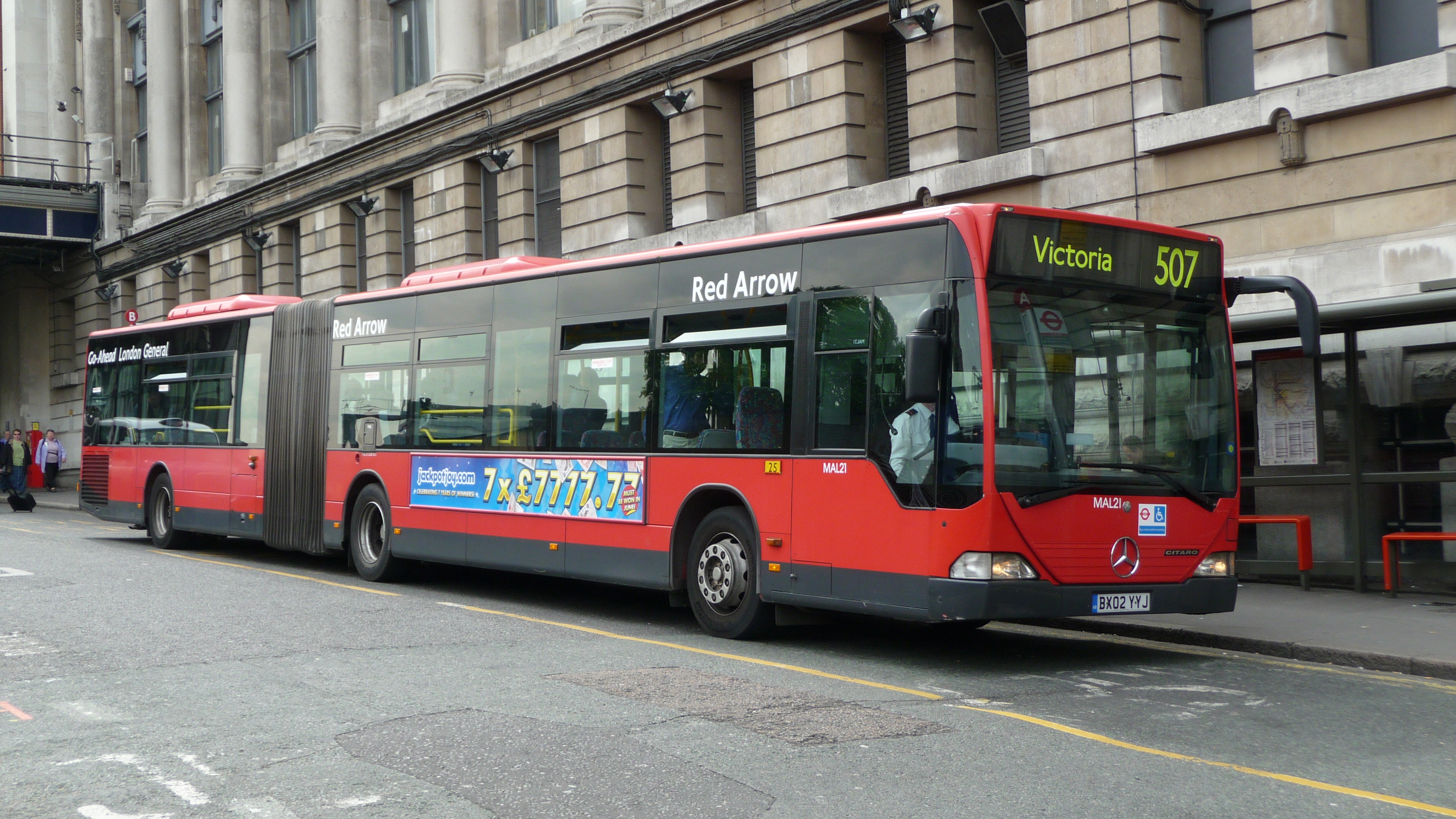
London General Mercedes-Benz Citaro G at Waterloo station in 2009

Red Arrow route 507 commenced operating on 7 September 1968 as part of the Red Arrow network of flat fare bus routes aimed at commuters in Central London linking some of the capital's main railway termini.

On 2 June 2002, along with route 521, the route was the first bus route in London to be converted to articulated bus operations with Mercedes-Benz O530G Citaros.

During late 2003 and early 2004, a series of onboard fires on Mercedes-Benz O530Gs led to withdrawal of the entire fleet, while Mercedes-Benz made some modifications. During this period limited services operated using a variety of different buses on route 507, including double-deckers.

On 25 July 2009, as part of the move to replace London's articulated buses, the O530Gs were replaced by Mercedes-Benz O530 Citaros.

Another criticism of articulated buses was the low number of seats, with only 49 per vehicle. A standard rigid Citaro has 44 seats, however the new ones for route 507 have just 21, with room supposedly for up to 76 standees, leading to criticism the new buses were "cattle trucks" and even more crowded than the buses they replaced.

In December 2013, two trial BYD electric buses were introduced. In September 2016, Alexander Dennis Enviro200EV bodied BYD electric buses began to operate the route, making it and route 521 the first battery electric bus routes in London. In September 2016, the buses on this route and the 521 received new digital route displays.

In 2021, the peak time frequency was reduced from 18 buses per hour to 7.5.

=== Route withdrawal ===
On 23 November 2022, it was announced that route 507 would be withdrawn following a consultation, with route 11 being rerouted to Waterloo to compensate for its loss. These changes were implemented on 29 April 2023.

== Former route ==
Route 507 operated via these primary locations:

- Waterloo station Cab Road
- County Hall
- St Thomas' Hospital
- Lambeth Palace
- Lambeth Bridge
- Millbank
- Westminster Cathedral
- Victoria bus station
