= Alexander Valentine =

British transport administrator

Sir Alexander Valentine OStJ
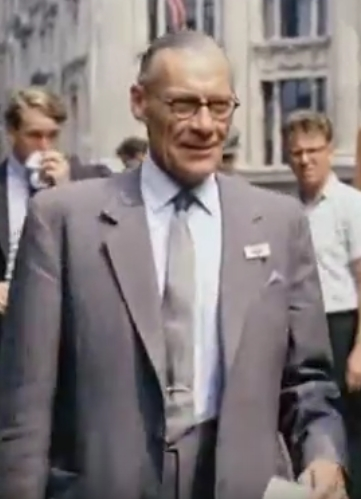
- Sir Alexander Valentine in 1964
- Born: 22 December 1899; Stockport, Greater Manchester, England
- Died: 1 December 1977 (aged 77)
- Occupation: Transport administrator
- Title: Chairman of London Transport Executive/London Transport Board
- Term: 1959–1965
- Predecessor: Sir John Elliot
- Successor: Sir Maurice Holmes

Sir Alexander (Alec) Balmain Bruce Valentine OStJ (22 December 1899 – 1 December 1977), was Chairman of the London Transport Executive from 1959 to 1963 and Chairman of the London Transport Board from 1963 to 1965.

== Family ==
Valentine was born in Stockport, the son of Mr & Mrs Milward Valentine and grandson of Scottish theologian Alexander Balmain Bruce. He married Beryl Barter in 1936 and the couple had three children, one son and two daughters.

== Career ==
Valentine was educated at Highgate School and Worcester College, Oxford before working in the gas industry until 1927. In 1928, he moved to the Underground Group where he worked as assistant to its managing director Frank Pick. After the Underground Group was absorbed into the London Passenger Transport Board (LPTB) in 1933, he remained with Pick (who became the LPTB's vice-chairman) until 1936. Valentine then held a series of senior management positions within the LPTB including Chief Commercial Officer and Operating Manager (Railways).

When the LPTB was nationalised in 1948, Valentine was made a member of the board of the London Transport Executive (LTE), the LPTB's replacement. As part of the board, Valentine argued for the abandonment of Trams in London, seeing them as a major cause of road congestion, which would be relieved by the introduction of buses, with the aesthetic benefit of doing away with overhead wires and the noisy operation of trams. He was also a member of the London Plan Working Party between 1946 and 1948 which led planning for new transport routes in the capital including the Victoria line built in the 1960s and 1970s. He served on the LTE board until 1954 when he moved to the board of the LTE's parent, the British Transport Commission (BTC).

In 1959, while remaining a member of the BTC board, he returned to the LTE as its chairman and remained in that position until the LTE was abolished and replaced with the London Transport Board of which he was also chairman until he retired in 1965.

Valentine was a member of the Channel Tunnel Study Group from 1957 to 1962 and a director of the Channel Tunnel Company from 1956 to 1969. He was a Fellow of the Chartered Institute of Transport and served as its president in 1951–1952 and was President of the Design and Industries Association in 1963–1964. He was Colonel commanding the Engineer and Railway Staff Corps of the Royal Engineers from 1963 to 1964.

Valentine was granted a knighthood in the Queen's birthday honours list in 1964.

Valentine was a keen bird-watcher and walker, and, taking his pen-name from a British wild bird, he wrote articles on country walks as Fieldfare in the Evening News during the 1930s. A collection of these was published as Tramping Round London in 1933.

Business positions
| Preceded by Sir John Elliot | Chairman, London Transport Executive; 1959–1963 | Succeeded by Abolished |
| Preceded by New Position | Chairman, London Transport Board; 1963–1965 | Succeeded by Maurice Holmes |
Military offices
| Preceded by Col. John Elliot | Officer Commanding, Engineer and Railway Staff Corps; 1963–1964 | Unknown |
