= Articulated buses in London =

Long bus used in London

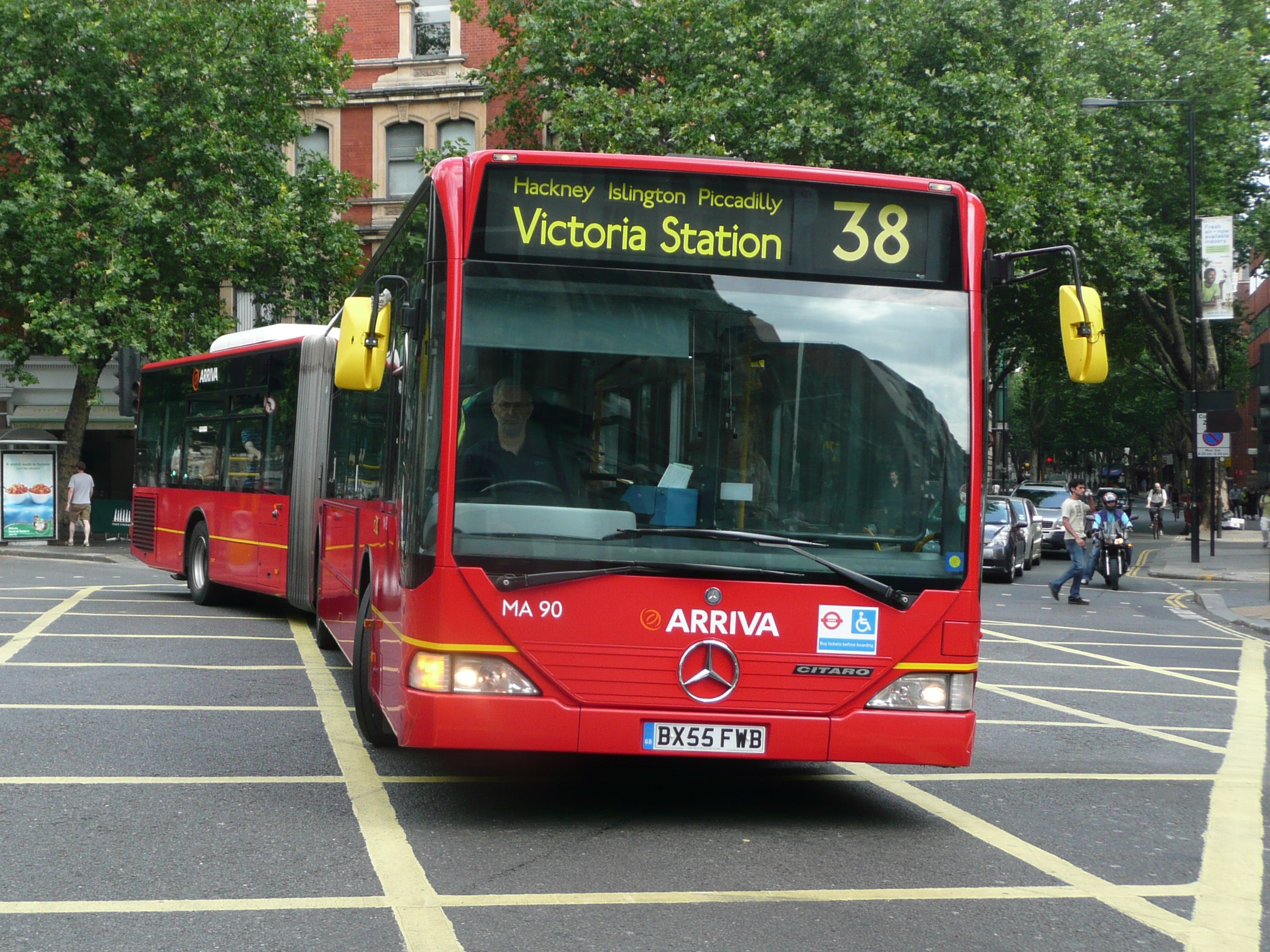
Arriva London Mercedes-Benz Citaro on route 38 in 2008

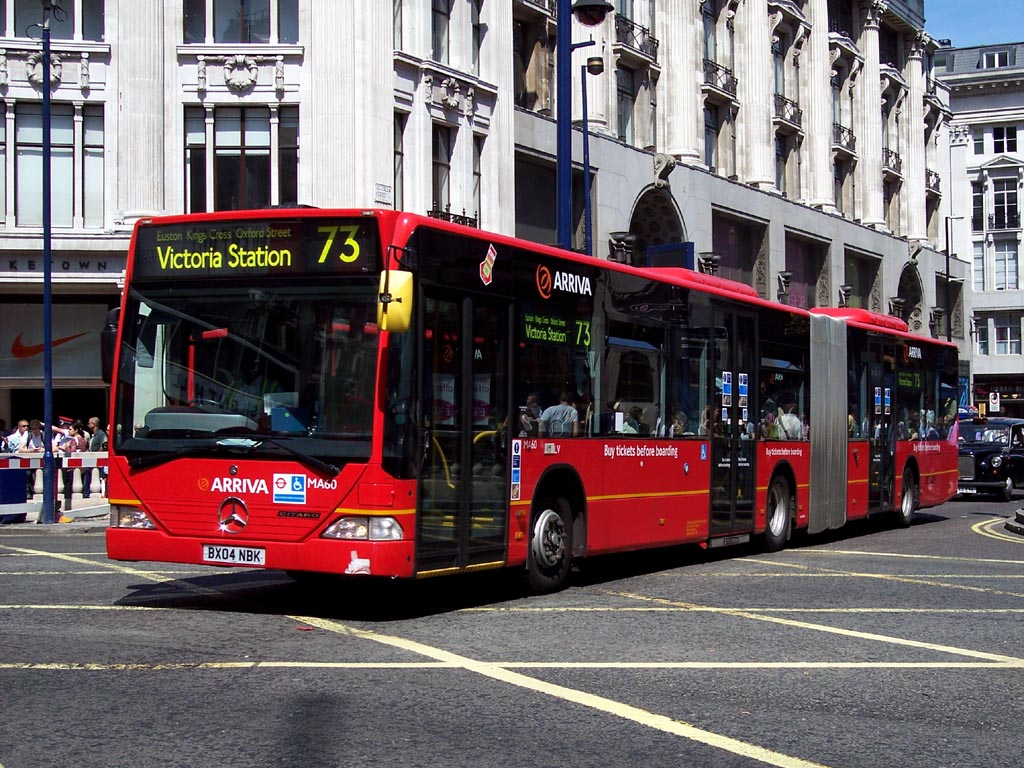
Arriva London Mercedes-Benz Citaro on route 73 in 2006

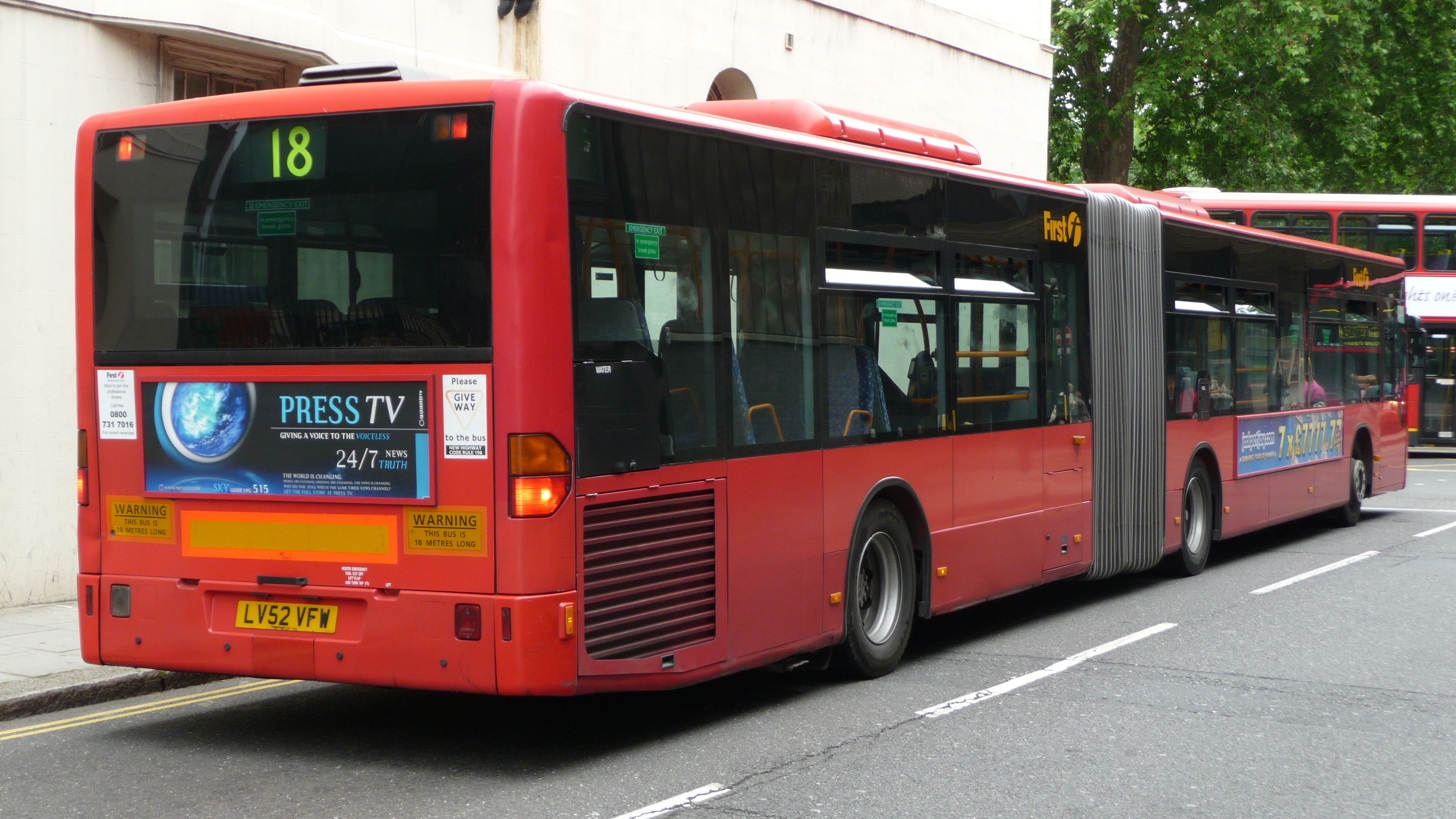
First London Mercedes-Benz Citaro on route 18 in 2009

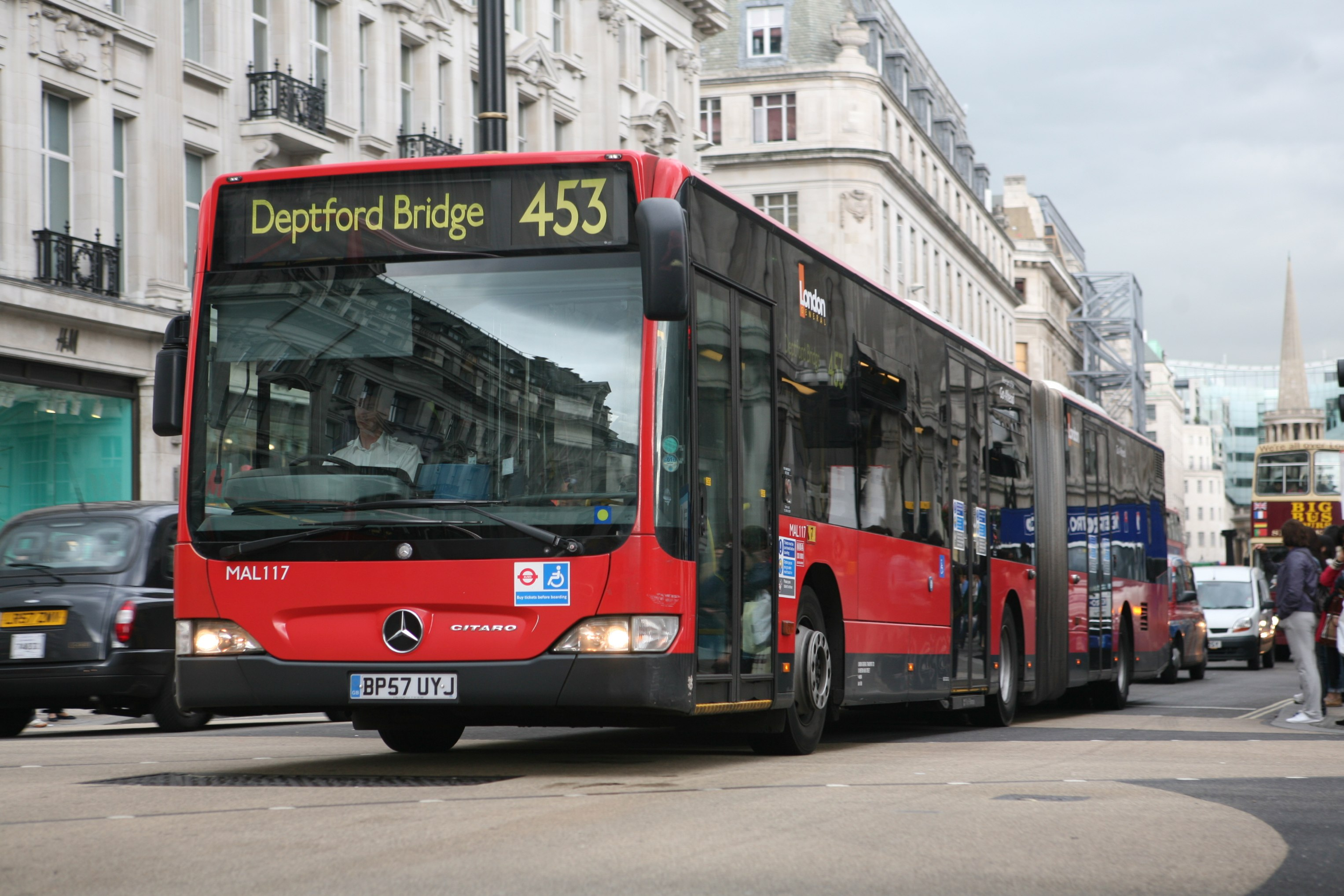
London General Mercedes-Benz Citaro on route 453 in 2011

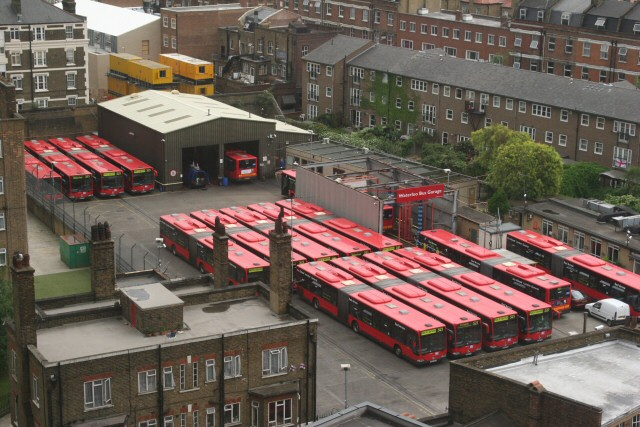
London General's Red Arrow articulated bus fleet at Waterloo garage in June 2006

Articulated buses, popularly called "bendy buses," were introduced to London in October 2001 when two Wright Eclipse Fusion bodied Volvo B7LAs were hired from First Hampshire & Dorset, one of which was repainted into First London's red livery, and six Wright Fusion bodied Volvo B10LAs from First Glasgow for a trial on route 207 between Shepherd's Bush and Hayes-By-Pass.

In June 2002, new Mercedes-Benz Citaro O530Gs were introduced on Red Arrow services 507 and 521. While articulated bus operation had been standard in several other countries for over 20 years, their use in the United Kingdom had been limited, with their introduction in London gaining a lot of press attention. They were later introduced on routes 12, 18, 25, 29, 38, 73, 149, 207, 436 and 453, which were among the busiest routes of the TfL bus network.

During the 2008 mayoral campaign, victorious Boris Johnson pledged to withdraw articulated buses on the grounds that they were unsuitable for London, and to introduce a modern version of the Routemaster bus. Withdrawals began in July 2009, when articulated buses on routes 38, 507 and 521 were replaced with conventional single and double decker buses, and a prototype for the New Routemaster was promised to be on the streets by 2012. The last articulated buses were withdrawn in December 2011.

== Background ==
Articulated buses were introduced on several high-capacity routes in the 2000s, coinciding with withdrawal from passenger service of the AEC Routemaster. With poor accessibility, the Routemasters do not conform to the Disability Discrimination Act 1995. There was a risk of litigation over accidents involving the Routemaster's rear open platform. In March 2003, Peter Hendy, then managing director of Surface Transport for TfL noted that the implementation of a low floor, accessible bus fleet was a higher priority than keeping the historic Routemaster buses.

Articulated buses with multiple doors and simultaneous boarding arrangements are capable of loading passengers in less time than conventional double decker buses and Routemasters. They have a much higher passenger capacity, being able to carry over 140 people per vehicle compared to 77 in a Routemaster, although with far fewer seats. The low-floor design of the buses also improves access for disabled people.

Compared to Routemasters and double decker buses, articulated buses take up around 80% more road space per vehicle: 18 m (59 ft) compared to 9.1 m (30 ft) for a Routemaster and 10 m (33 ft) for a double decker. In terms of road length used per passenger, the increase is 8.7%: 12.8 cm (5.0 in) for an articulated bus passenger, 11.8 cm (4.6 in) per Routemaster passenger.

The increased vehicle size meant they were more likely to block junctions and cause difficulties for other road users. Press coverage regarding cyclists and motorcyclists was generally negative due to the reduced viewpoint of the driver and greater likelihood of cyclists to enter blind spots.

The routes converted to articulated bus operation were:

Route	Commenced	Ceased	Operator	Replaced by
12	6 November 2004	4 November 2011	London Central	double decker buses
18	15 November 2003	12 November 2010	First London	double decker buses
25	26 June 2004	24 June 2011	East London	double decker buses
29	14 January 2006	25 November 2011	Arriva London	double decker buses
38	29 October 2005	13 November 2009	Arriva London	double decker buses
73	4 September 2004	2 September 2011	Arriva London	double decker buses
149	24 April 2004	15 October 2010	Arriva London	double decker buses
207	9 April 2005	9 December 2011	First London	double decker buses
436	8 February 2003	18 November 2011	London Central	double decker buses
453	15 March 2003	23 September 2011	Selkent; London General (1)	double decker buses
507	5 June 2002	24 July 2009	London General	single decker buses
521	5 June 2002	31 August 2009	London General	single decker buses

(1) Route 453 transferred from Selkent to London General on 16 February 2008 after tender renewal

== Incidents ==
=== Fires ===
During the initial stages of deployment of the articulated buses, between December 2003 and March 2004; there were three similar fires on the new Mercedes-Benz Citaro buses, causing concern over the possibility of an in-built risk to the public. In one incident, a bus caught fire on its delivery route to its operator. The fires caused the temporary withdrawal and modification of the entire fleet of 130 buses.

The buses were brought back into service after engineers replaced and modified problematic pipework in the bus engines. A later fire was ruled out as unconnected. The problem resurfaced with ex–Arriva London buses in Malta in August 2013.

=== Increased fare evasion ===
The introduction of articulated buses increased fare evasion as passengers were able to enter through any door, leading to the buses becoming known to Londoners as "The Free Bus". On other UK buses (including articulated buses outside London), entry is only permitted via the front entrance, which is monitored by the driver and thus discourages evasion. As a result, Transport for London recruited an extra 150 Revenue Protection Inspectors to police revenue collection. In 2006 it was reported that conventional buses (i.e. single and double-deckers) accounted for £3,636 each in annual fare evasion, compared to articulated vehicles at £6,333 each.

=== Campaign issue ===
In September 2007, Boris Johnson, the Conservative Party candidate for the 2008 Mayor of London elections, said that his first act as mayor of London would be to "scrap" articulated buses and replace them with a "modern-day AEC Routemaster" with an open rear platform and a conductor. The New Routemaster first entered service in February 2012.

== Withdrawal ==
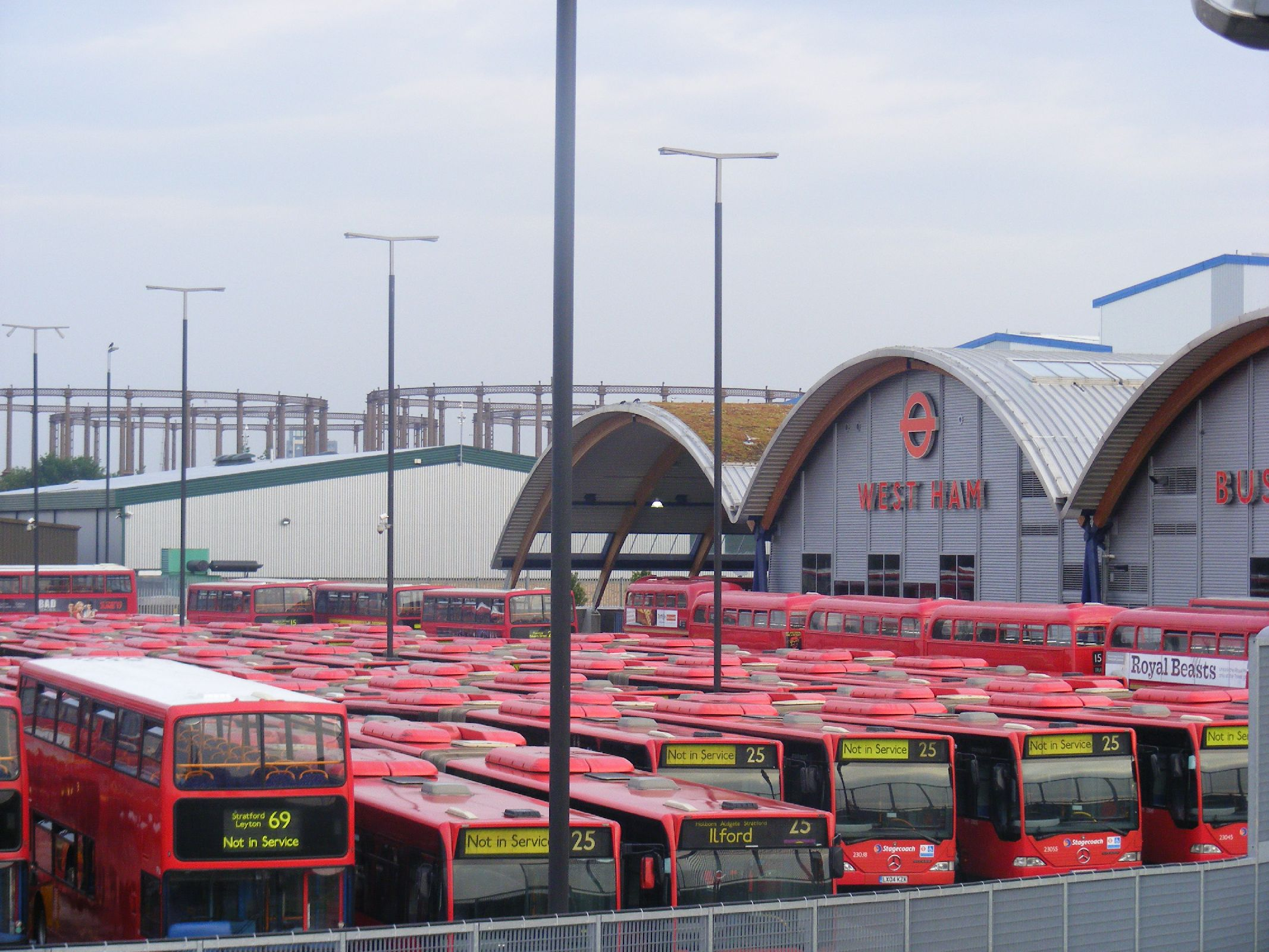
Withdrawn Stagecoach London Mercedes-Benz Citaro at West Ham garage in 2011

In August 2008, following the election of Boris Johnson as Mayor of London, it was announced the articulated buses would be withdrawn as their five-year operating contracts expired, starting from May 2009, and completed by 2013 (or 2015 depending on contract extensions). This was brought forward to December 2011.

Research by London TravelWatch indicated that such a withdrawal could prove costly to TfL. A study conducted in September 2008 found that replacing articulated vehicles on routes 38, 507, and 521, whilst maintaining overall route capacity, would cost an additional £12.6m per annum, due to the additional vehicles necessitated. Additional cost was also incurred with the need to pay early termination fees on leases.

The first articulated vehicles to be replaced were on routes 507 and 521, which were replaced by twelve-metre long single-deck buses in July and September 2009 respectively. Articulated buses were replaced by double-deckers on route 38 in November 2009. Route 207 was the last route to operate articulated buses on 10 December 2011.

Withdrawn buses have found their way to other parts of the UK. Some went to Arriva Midlands in Leicester and Arriva North West in Liverpool. Go-Ahead Group transferred some to its Brighton & Hove, Go North East and Go South Coast divisions. Some were sold to CT Plus, Bristol and McGill's Bus Services, Glasgow. Arriva also exported 81 to Malta in 2011 for use by its Arriva Malta subsidiary.

One articulated vehicle, MAL15 from the Red Arrow batch, has been preserved by the Bromley Bus Preservation Group.

== See also ==
- Articulated bus
- Articulated buses in the United Kingdom
- Buses in London
- List of bus types used in London
