= Red Arrow (London Buses) =

Limited-stop London bus routes, 1966–2009

Red Arrow was a brand name given to several former London bus limited stop routes used as high frequency commuter services in central London. The last Red Arrow services to operate were routes 507 and 521, with the brand being retired altogether in September 2009, only being briefly revived in May 2016 to commemorate its 50th anniversary. On 29 April 2023, routes 507 and 521 were both withdrawn.

== History ==
=== London Transport ===
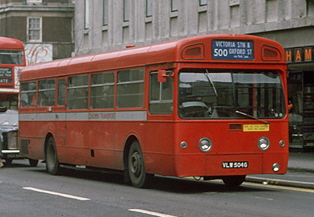
AEC Merlin on route 500 in Oxford Street in 1976

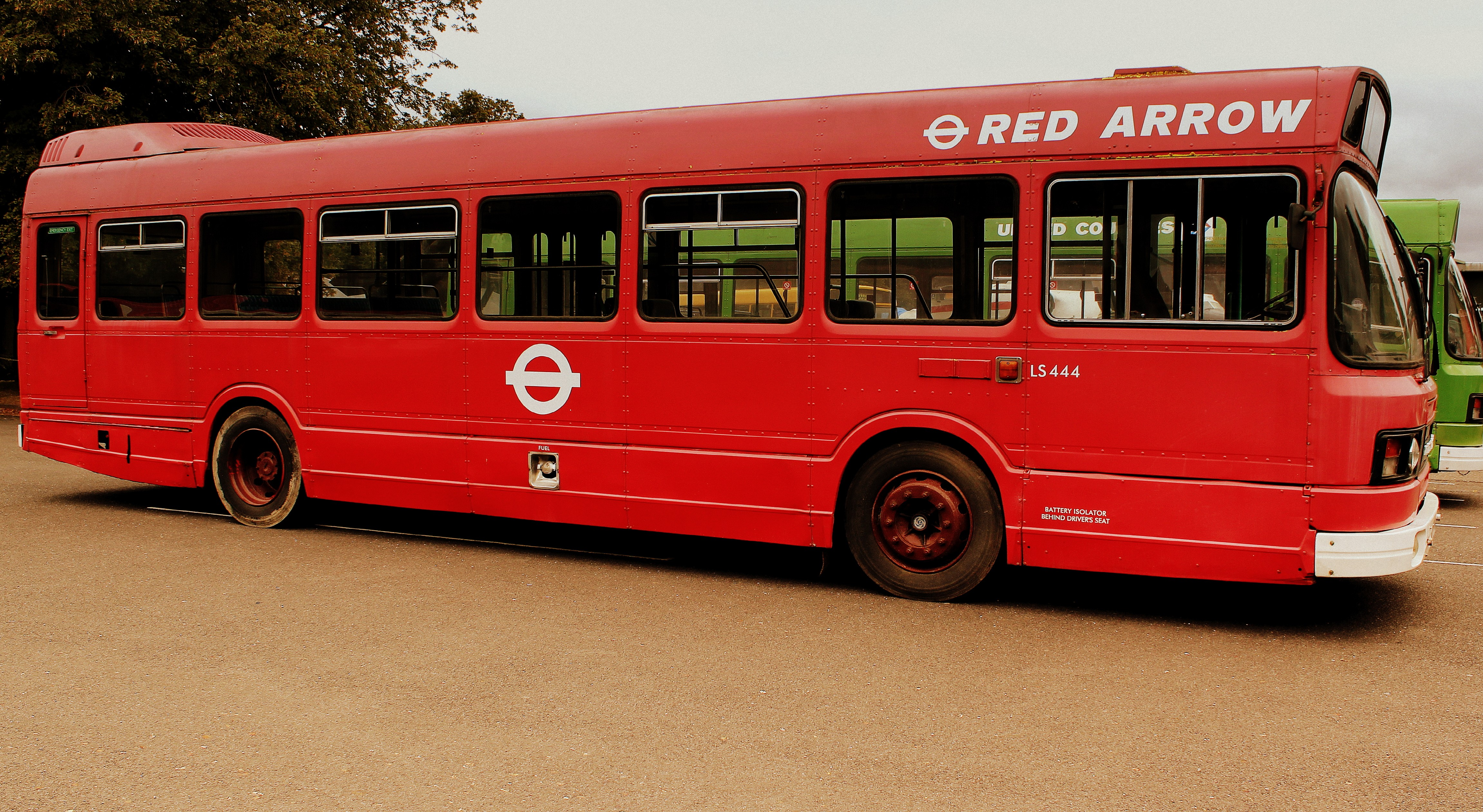
Preserved Leyland National with Red Arrow branding

London Transport had instigated a Bus Reshaping Plan in 1966 to examine bus service operation, and settled on replacing some double-decker buses with long single-decker buses, which would have extra capacity by implementing a 'standee bus' model as used on the continent, whereby the fixed seating in the bus would be minimised to that required off-peak, with hand holds fitted to allow maximum standee capacity at peak times. These buses would also have dual doors.

The concept was introduced with on 18 April 1966 with six AEC Merlin buses on a new express service, route 500, running between Victoria and Marble Arch, extended during shopping hours to Oxford Circus. On 7 September 1968 LT introduced these new buses on more Red Arrow routes, 501–507, along with wholesale introduction on several other route networks around the capital.

The Red Arrow Network as of 1972 was:

- 500 Victoria station - Park Lane - Oxford Street - Marble Arch - Park Lane - Victoria station
- 501 Waterloo station - Aldwych - Holborn - St Paul's - Bank - London Bridge station
- 502 Waterloo station – Aldwych – Fleet Street - St Paul's – London Wall - Liverpool Street station
- 503 Waterloo station – Westminster Bridge - Victoria station
- 505 Waterloo station - Aldwych - Holborn – Old Street – Shoreditch Church
- 506 Victoria station – Green Park – Piccadilly Circus
- 507 Waterloo station – Lambeth Bridge - Victoria station
- 513 Waterloo station - Aldwych - Fleet Street - St Paul's – Cannon Street - London Bridge station

From February 1981, London Transport started replacing its AEC Merlin buses on the Red Arrow services with 69 new Leyland National IIs. Further expansions, contractions and renumbering of the route network occurred, but the core Red Arrow network remained into the 1980s, and into London Buses operation with the London General business unit, as part of the first stage of the privatisation of London bus services.

=== London General ===
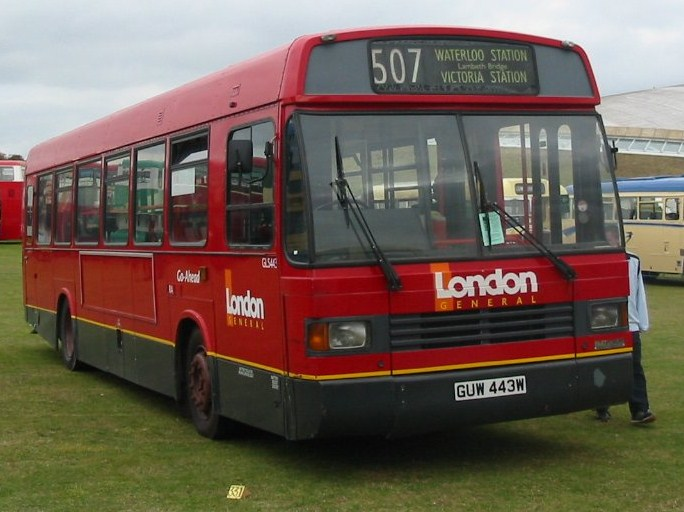
Preserved London General Leyland National Greenway

Between 1992 and 1994, the 41 National IIs on Red Arrow duties were re-bodied and re-engined as Leyland National Greenways, and in 1994 were included in the sale of London General to the Go-Ahead Group. The Greenways were given 'cherished registrations' transferred from disposed of AEC Routemasters, to hide their apparent registration age for seemingly new buses. With a subtle repaint, the Greenways continued operating the Red Arrow branded network, although by 1998 it had been contracted to just four routes, 501, 505, 507 and 521. Route 505 was withdrawn in October 2000, replaced by an extension of route 243 and 501 in 2002.

==== Articulated buses ====
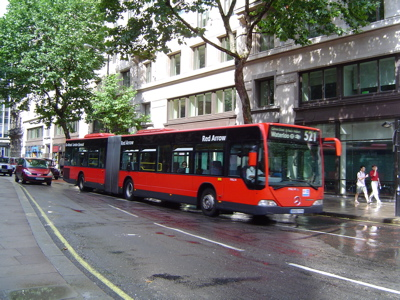
London General Mercedes-Benz Citaro O530G Articulated Red Arrow bus on route 521 at Aldwych in June 2004

On 5 June 2002, the remaining two Red Arrow services, routes 507 and 521 became the first London Buses services to be converted to use articulated buses when a fleet of 31 articulated Mercedes-Benz Citaro O530Gs entered service on both routes. These routes resembled the original Red Arrow standee bus concept, featuring off-bus ticketing at 49 points along both routes. Additionally, route 521 ran through the Strand underpass making double decker operation impossible. The artics still carried the Red Arrow name, although it was much smaller and less pronounced than all the previous versions.

As of 2008, the peak operating requirement was nine buses on the 507 and 19 on the 521. As part of the move to replace London's articulated buses, a commitment made in the 2008 London Mayoral election, the articulated buses on the 507 and 521 were replaced when their contracts expired in 2009.

The articulated Citaros were replaced by new 12 metre rigid versions. On 25 July 2009 a weekend service was introduced on route 507, the first weekend service for a Red Arrow route. Route 521 converted to rigid operation on 1 September 2009. The new Citaros did not carry the Red Arrow name, as it was thought to be associated with articulated buses. This drew criticism, as there was nothing to distinguish the buses from normal services. Another criticism of bendy buses was the low number of seats, with only 49 per vehicle. A standard rigid Citaro has 44 seats, however the new ones for route 507 and 521 had just 21, with room for up to 76 standees, leading to criticism the new buses were "cattle trucks" and even more crowded than the buses they replaced.

==== Demise ====
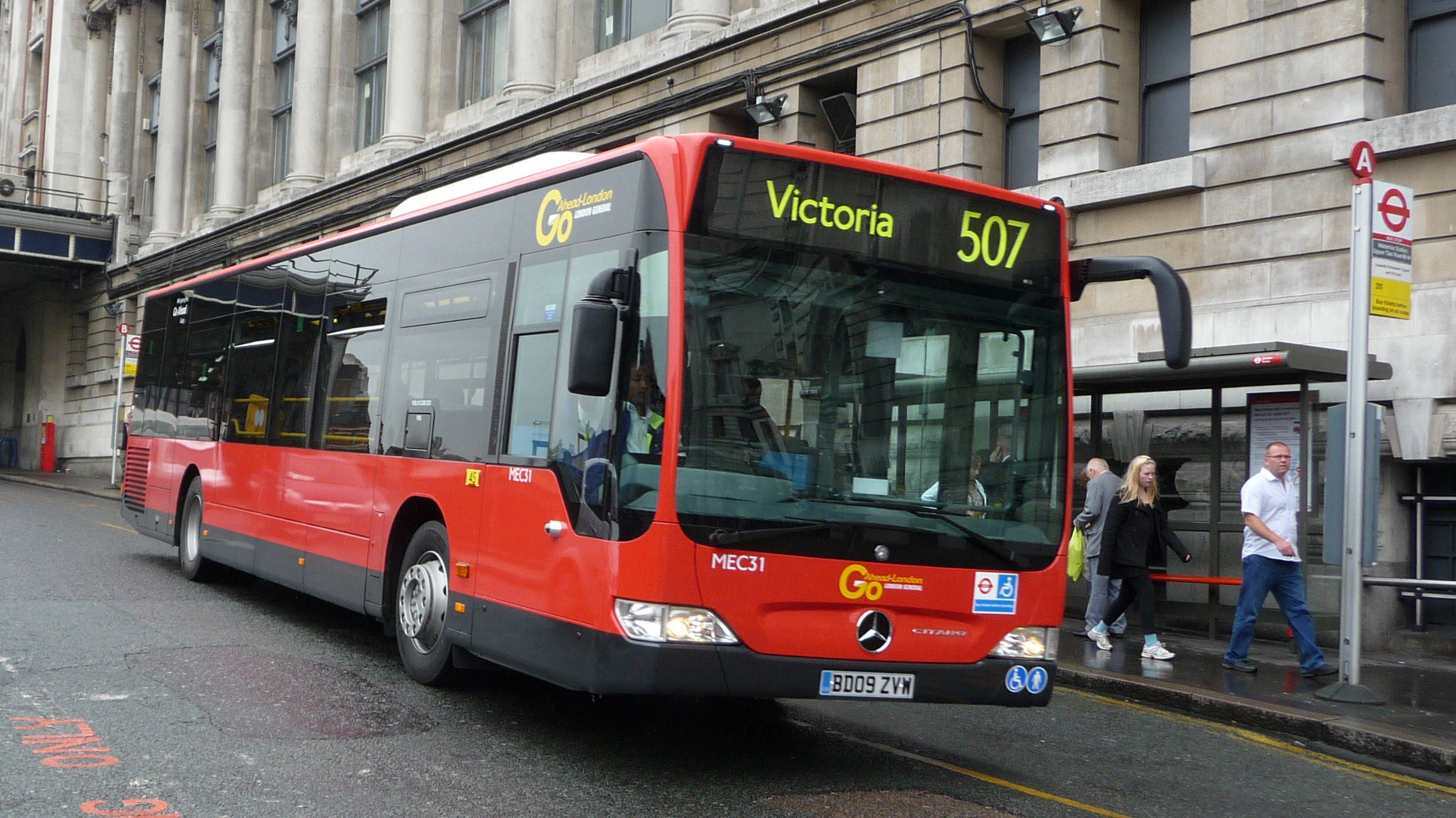
Go-Ahead London Mercedes-Benz Citaro rigid on route 507 at Waterloo station in July 2009

After a public consultation in June 2022, it was announced that on 29 April 2023, both routes 507 and 521 would be withdrawn and replaced with portions of routes 3, 11, 59 and 133, leading to the end of the short-distance commuter buses in central London.

== See also ==
- Buses in London
- Articulated buses in London
