= London Buses route 521 =

Former London bus route

521
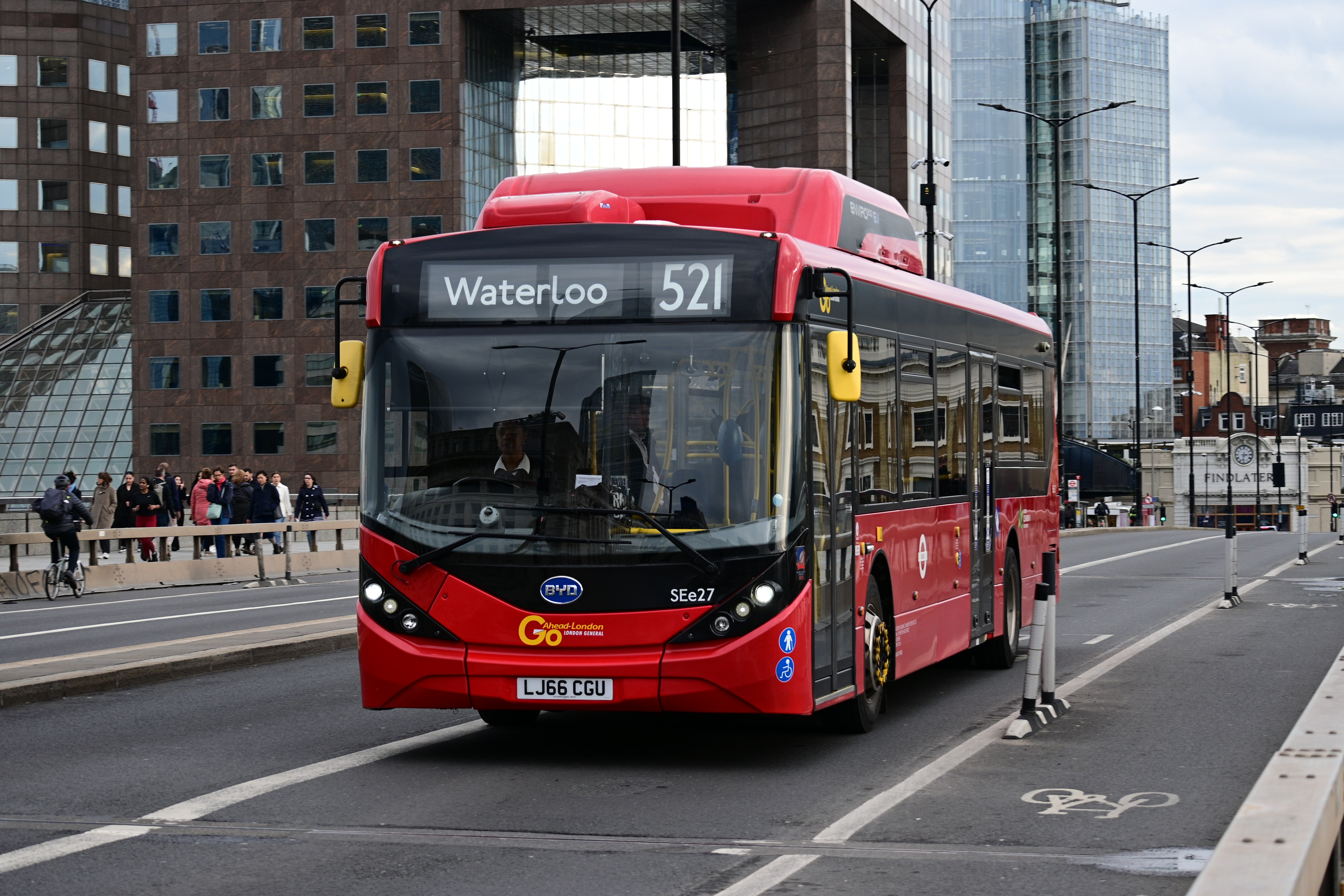
- London General BYD Alexander Dennis Enviro200EV on London Bridge in April 2023

Overview
- Operator: London General (Go-Ahead London)
- Garage: Waterloo
- Vehicle: BYD Alexander Dennis Enviro200EV
- Peak vehicle requirement: 15
- Status: Defunct
- Began service: 18 July 1992
- Ended service: 29 April 2023
- Predecessors: Route 501; Route 513
- Night-time: No night service

Route
- Start: London Bridge bus station
- Via: Cannon Street; St Paul's station Holborn
- End: Waterloo station
- Length: 3 miles (4.8 km)

Service
- Level: Monday to Friday
- Frequency: About every 2-12 minutes
- Journey time: 21-34 minutes
- Operates: 06:29 until 00:33

London Buses route 521 was a Transport for London contracted bus route in London, England. It ran between London Bridge bus station and Waterloo station, and was operated by Go-Ahead London subsidiary London General.

It was also one of two Red Arrow branded services. In 2016, routes 507 and 521 became the first battery electric bus routes in Central London, and the second operated by Transport for London, after route 312.

== History ==
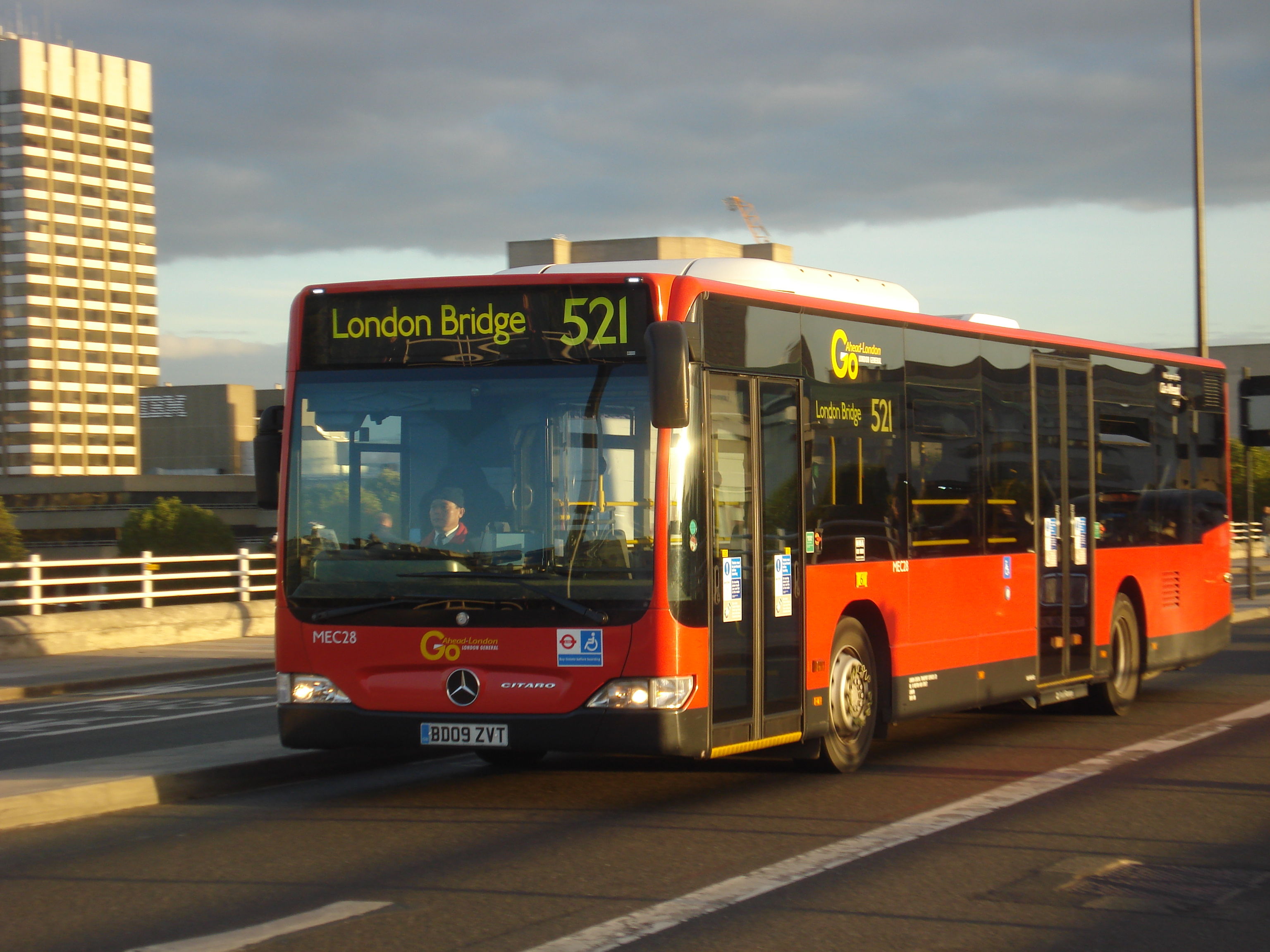
London General Mercedes-Benz O530 Citaro on Waterloo Bridge in 2013

Route 521 commenced operating on 18 July 1992 as part of the Red Arrow network of bus routes aimed at commuters in Central London linking some of the capital's main railway termini.

On 2 June 2002, along with route 507, the route was the first bus route in London to be converted to articulated bus with Mercedes-Benz O530G Citaros.

During late 2003, early 2004, a series of onboard fires on Mercedes-Benz O530Gs led to withdrawal of the entire fleet, while Mercedes-Benz made some modifications. During this period limited services operated using a variety of different buses on route 521.

In September 2009, as part of the move to replace London's articulated buses, the O530Gs were replaced by Mercedes-Benz O530 Citaros.

Another criticism of articulated buses was the low number of seats, with only 49 per vehicle. A standard rigid Citaro has 44 seats, however the new ones for route 521 have just 21, with room supposedly for up to 76 standers, leading to criticism the new buses were "cattle trucks" and even more crowded than the buses they replaced.

In December 2013, two trial BYD electric buses were introduced. In September 2016, Alexander Dennis Enviro200EV bodied BYD electric buses began to operate the route, making it and route 507 the first battery electric bus routes in London. In September 2016, the buses on this route and on the 507 have received new digital route displays.

On 28 August 2021, the PVR was cut to 15 vehicles rather than 32.

=== Route withdrawal ===
On 23 November 2022, it was announced that route 521 would be withdrawn following a consultation, with routes 59 and 133 being rerouted to replace it either side of St Paul's. These changes were implemented on 29 April 2023.

== Former route ==
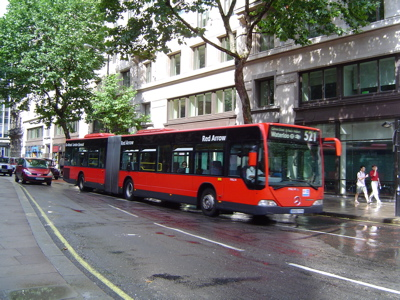
London General Mercedes-Benz O530G Citaro in August 2004

Route 521 operated via these primary locations:

- London Bridge bus station for London Bridge station
- London Bridge
- Monument station
- Cannon Street station
- Mansion House station
- St Paul's station
- City Thameslink station
- Holborn Circus
- Chancery Lane station
- Holborn station
- Aldwych (to Waterloo only; buses to London Bridge skipped the stops in Aldwych via the Strand underpass)
- South Bank Waterloo Bridge
- Waterloo station
