= Setright Machine =

Bus ticket issuing machine

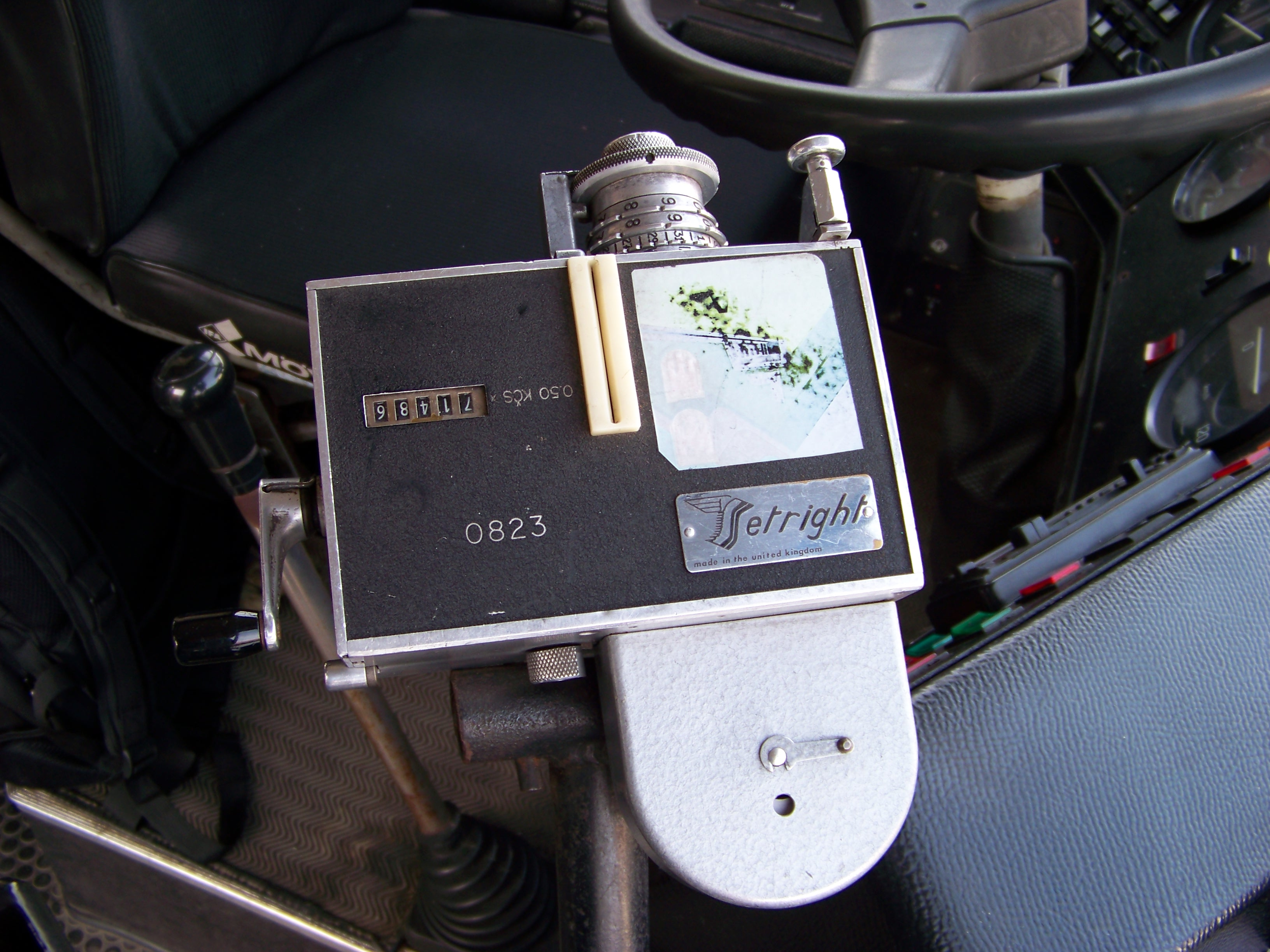
The distinctive case of the machine, with the blank roll carrier below

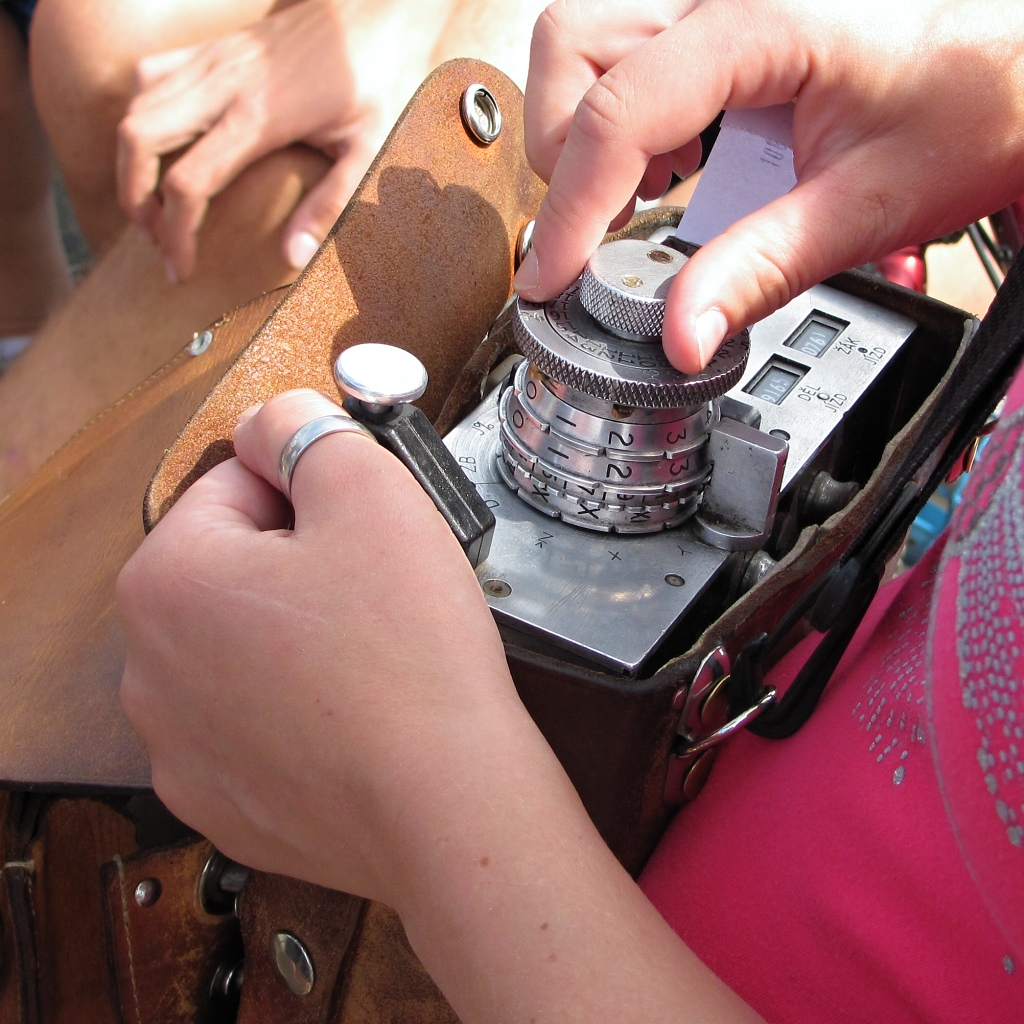
A conductor's view, showing the setting dials

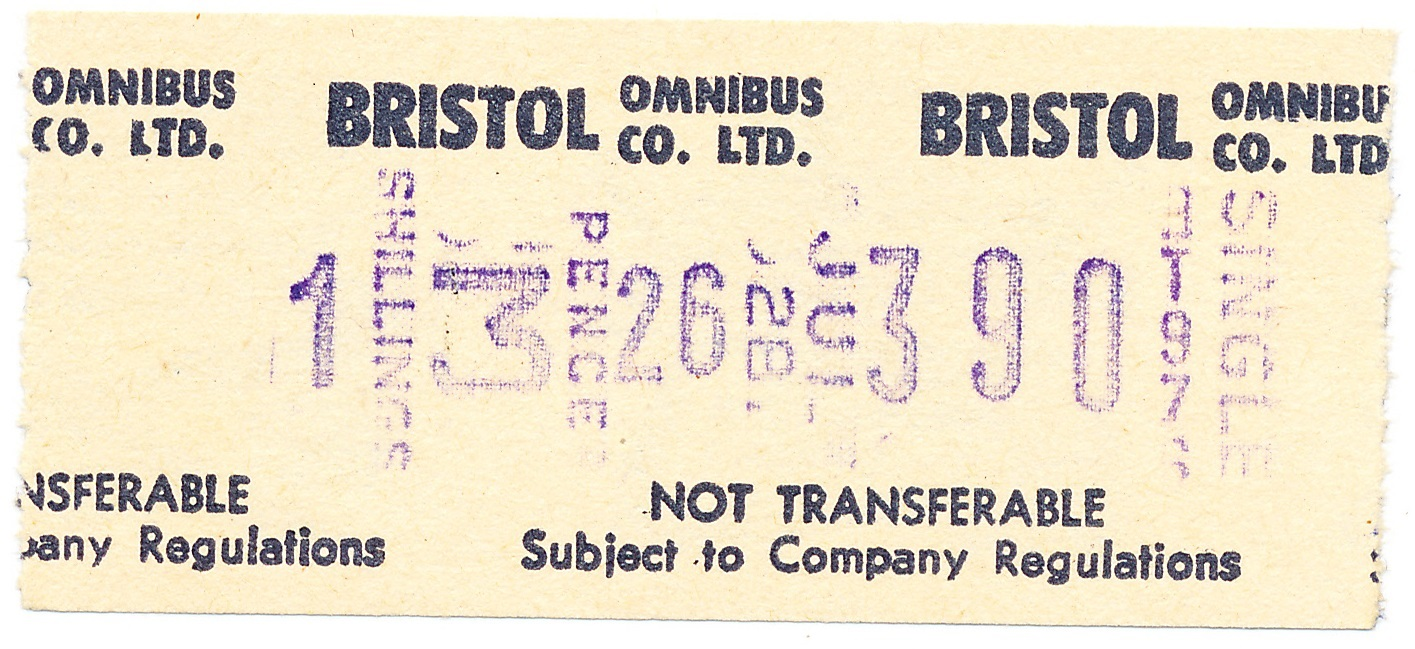
Typical Setright UK bus ticket from 1960 showing left to right: fare paid as 1 shilling and 3 pence, stage boarded as 26, date issued as JUL 28, ticket serial 390, machine number BT976, class of ticket as SINGLE journey

A Setright Machine is a machine operated by a conductor or guard for issuing bus tickets from a blank paper roll. Not only does it print the ticket as a receipt for the passenger to retain as proof of payment, it also has mechanical counters driven internally by the mechanism to count the total amount of money represented by the series of tickets issued. If the user fills in a waybill showing the starting register readings and later the end of duty readings, the total sum of money to be paid to the bus owner is readily calculated. Another counter provides the total number of tickets issued which should be equal to the number of passengers who travelled.

== Technology ==
The Setright "Speed" model can print any value within the range for which it has been designed and can easily deal with changes in fares. A set of concentric dials on the top is used to set the value and levers can set different fares (such as "Adult" or "Child") and other vital information (such as "Inbound" or "Outbound"). The machine is entirely manually powered and requires no external power or batteries, although electric power packs are available for use in one-person operated buses. To print a ticket, the operator releases a small trigger on the base of the case and rotates the crank handle by one turn for each ticket. These actions are easily carried out with one hand. Multiple tickets are quickly printed by simply turning the crank once for each.

Some machines also included a ticket punch attached to the top corner of the case (illustrated).

== Features ==
Only a single paper roll is needed and, unlike other multi-roll machines, this roll does not need to be replaced or re-printed if ticket prices change.

The machines are reliable and unlikely to jam. A distinctive whirring noise is made as each ticket is issued.

== History ==
Australian engineer Henry Roy Setright (Note: Henry Roy Setright was the father of noted motoring journalist L. J. K. Setright.) patented his ticket machine in 1922 and the company Setright Registers Ltd. was formed to manufacture them. In 1955 it occupied Eastway Works, Eastway, Hackney Wick, London E9 and later moved in 1967 to the Fairfield Works, Fairfield Road, Bow, London E3, suitably adjacent to the London Transport bus garage, although LT used the Gibson Machine (produced by Ticket Equipment Ltd, based on the TIM system). The Company moved its main operation to Belfast in 1965 Noteworthy were the vibrant export sales to the former communist countries of Czechoslovakia and the German Democratic Republic where Setright machines were to be found everywhere. In contrast the marque was unknown in the former West Germany.

In Czechoslovakia and then the Czech Republic, these machines were also occasionally used in other areas e.g. in river ship transport, or for entrance tickets (Koněprusy Caves, Lhota swimming lake etc.).
