= Gibson ticket machine =

Handheld apparatus for issuing bus tickets

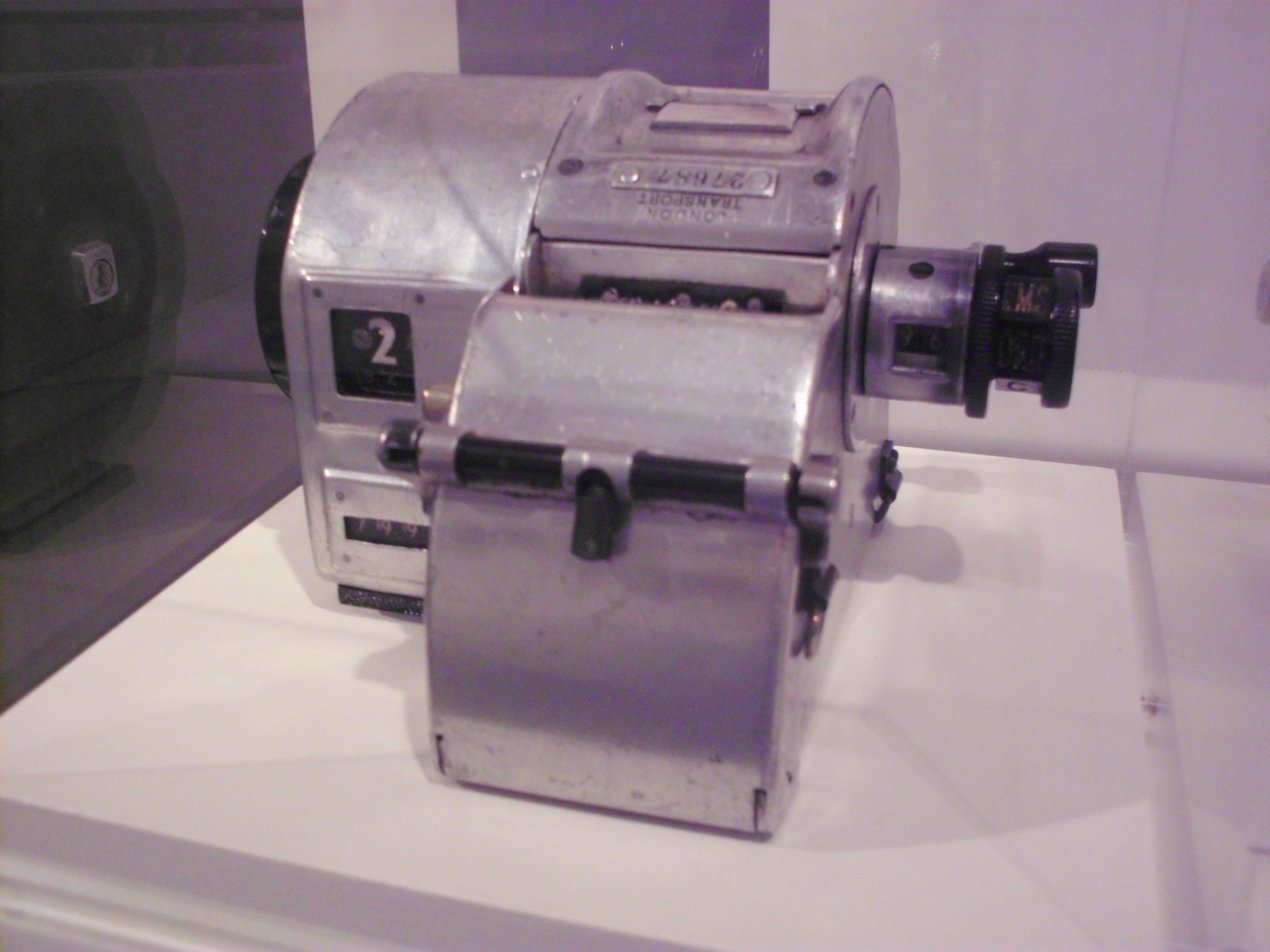
A decimalised Gibson machine

The Gibson A14 ticket machine is a handheld, hand-powered apparatus for issuing bus tickets from a blank paper roll, formerly used by London Transport (LT) and operated by a conductor or guard. It was in use from 1953 until 1993, was designed by former London Transport Superintendent of fare collection at LT's Effra Road ticket machine works, George Gibson. It was manufactured by Ticket Issuing Machines Limited.

== Background ==
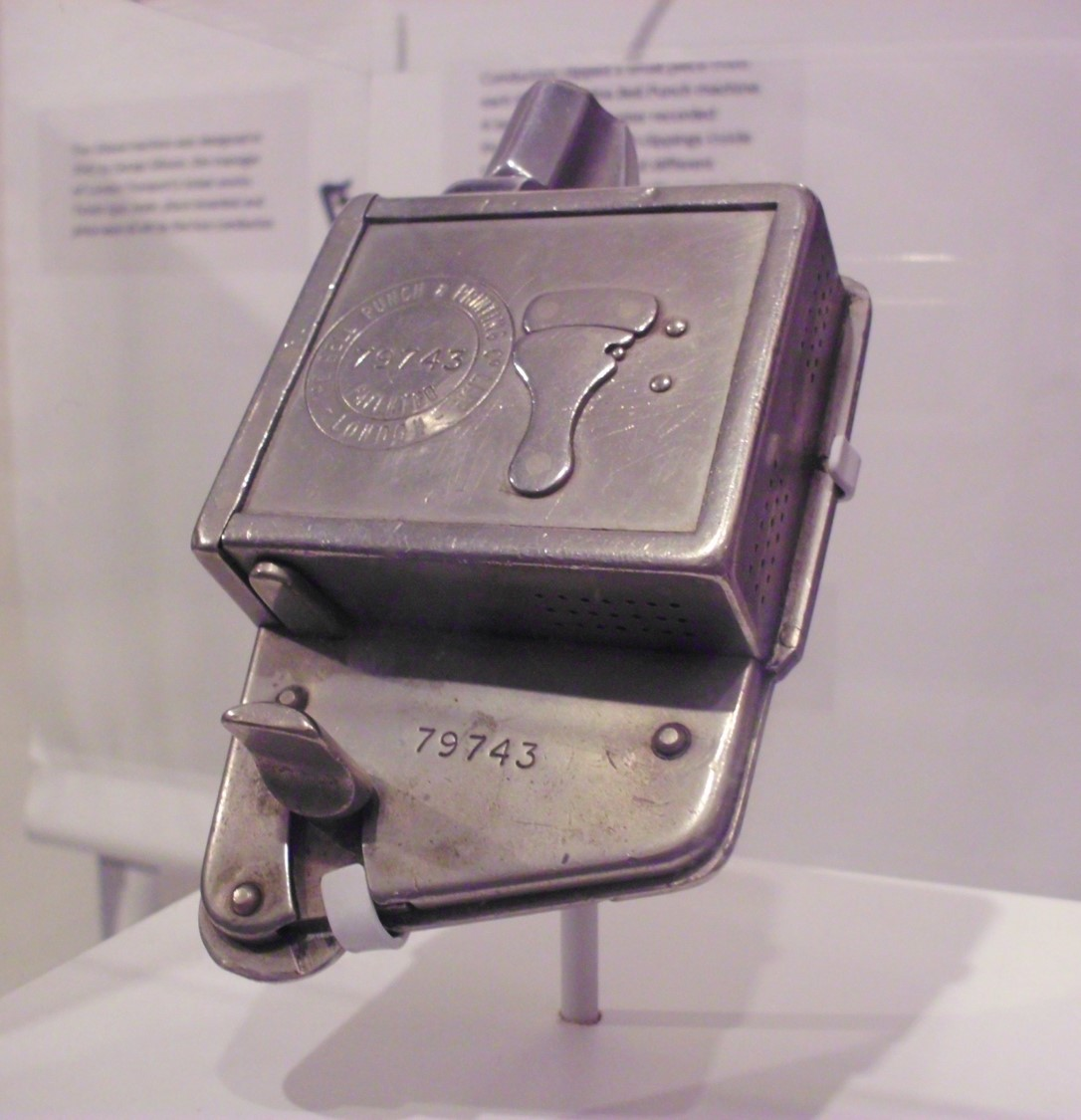
A London Transport Bell Punch Co. ticket machine

Prior to the Gibson, LT and its predecessors had generally used the Bell Punch system. Bell Punch ticket cancellers were invented and used to combat fraud. Some conductors might keep some of the day's takings for themselves, and the driver might get a share. There was no effective method for correlating the money from the number of tickets sold, and the amount of money received at the depot. London General Omnibus Company's plain clothes inspectors attempted to combat this, but were not very effective. The LGOC was so desperate to solve the problem that in 1877, they ran a competition for solutions with a £1000 prize, but none of the 671 entries (including one from famous magician John Nevil Maskelyne suggesting use of serial numbers on tickets) met all of the conditions.

In the Bell Punch system, numbered tickets colour-coded to a specific value were selected from a set in a rack carried by a conductor. Tickets had the appropriately marked section for the journey hole-punched by the machine. The machine stored the chads (punched circles) which could later be counted, and the value of the tickets sold calculated and compared against the takings from the conductor, to stop fraud. The conductor kept their own record of their takings in a waybill. In a further effort to stop misuse, when a hole was punched in a ticket the machine rang a bell, giving a distinctive 'ting' - so that, for example, a conductor could not take the money and simply pretend to punch a ticket (and so prevent the chad being stored in the machine).

They were mainly produced by the Bell Punch Printing Company Ltd, London (who typically also made the tickets to go with them), although other companies, such as Williamson, produced their own varieties of machine.

Bell Punches were first used by London Roadcar, a private bus company and predecessor of London Transport, from its inauguration in 1881, and most companies (including tramway operators) except the LGOC were using them by 1890 (the LGOC was reluctant to, partially for fear of staff strikes). Eventually they were introduced by the LGOC, in June 1891, and in their heyday 4 billion tickets were produced each year for operators in London.

The Bell Punch system had many disadvantages - it could be slow to use, and the conductor was encumbered with both a long rack of tickets and a heavy metal ticket machine. The counting of the chads was necessary to prevent fraud but was very time-consuming and labour-intensive. It was still not impervious to some forms of fraud - some conductors, when handing in their machine, would claim that their counter was broken to account for the missing cash (that they had actually pocketed)

== The Gibson ==
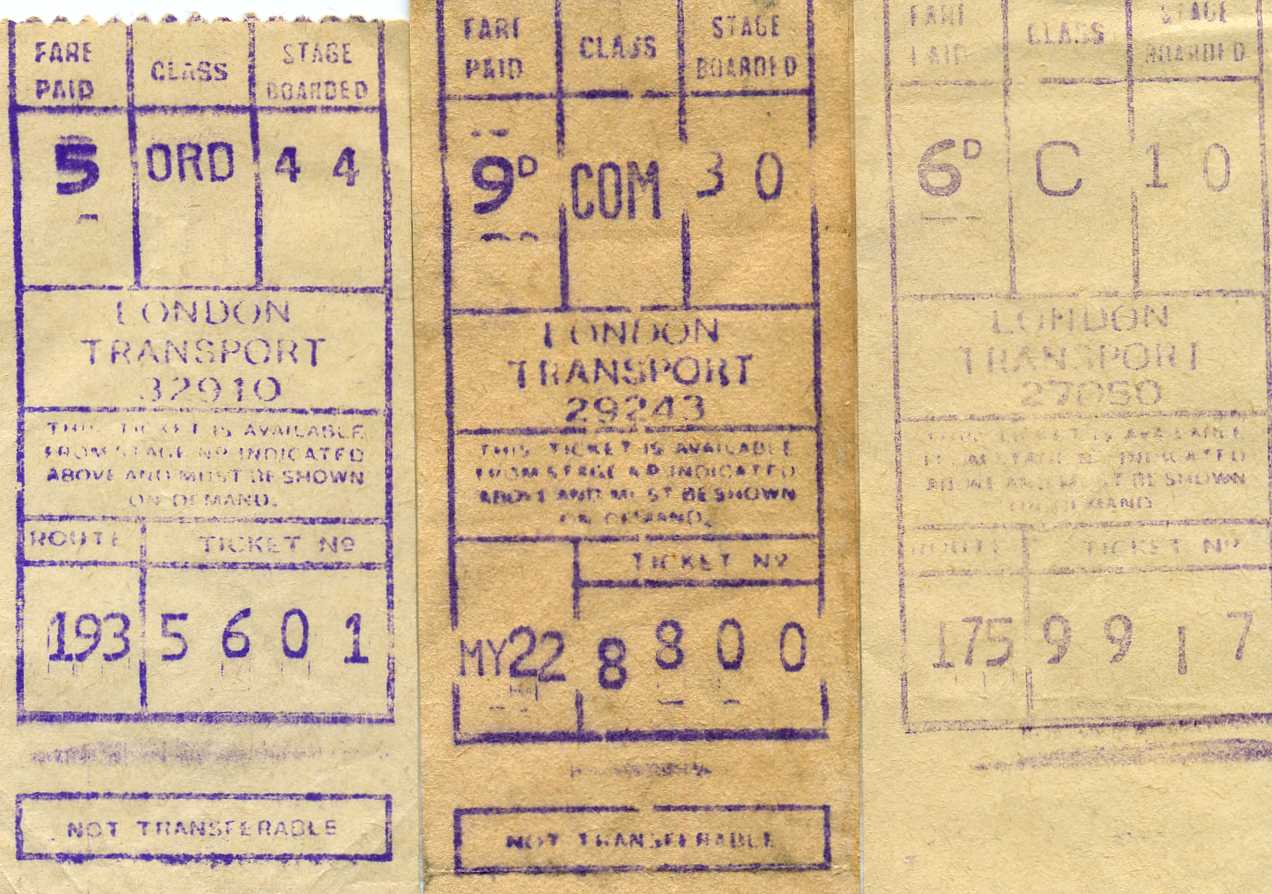
Gibson machine tickets from the Romford area, 1969

The Gibson used a very different system. Rather than using pre-printed tickets, information was printed onto a paper roll as part of the process of issuing the ticket. Altering various dials on the machine could alter the information printed, e.g. the ticket type (adult, child, single, return etc.) or the fare. Therefore, the ticket machine could be made much more compact.

The Gibson also improved upon the Bell Punch system by having meters to record the numbers of each individual type of ticket issued. Other advantages included faster issuing of tickets, that the conductor would have more hands free, and that tickets did not need to be specially pre-printed. The latter also meant that companies was no longer had to account for an asset that needed to be audited, as the paper rolls have very little worth in comparison to a pre-printed ticket that could be stolen/pilfered. By October 1958 Bell Punch machines on LT had been completely replaced (Poplar and West Ham trolleybus depots being the last to use them).

Nearer the end of their use and after decimalisation of UK currency, LT dispensed with having the machines recording specific values for fares, as changing the printed plates at each fare increase was becoming expensive. Instead, the machines used letter codes, and passengers on the bus could see which letter corresponded to which fare by a notice at the entrance to the vehicle. In this way, only the notice would have to be changed at fare rises.

They are often associated with Routemaster buses, as Gibson machines were most often used on crew-operated (driver and conductor) buses. The Routemasters were some of the last buses to be crew-operated in London, due to their open rear entrances. However, some types of buses, including the GS and RF types, did have adapted versions of the machine for use on driver-only buses.

The Gibson was last officially used on 21 August 1993. It has become considered an iconic design within London transport history, due to its longevity, its use on the iconic Routemaster, and also due to the very distinctive whirring sound they produced when the handle was turned to issue a ticket.
