= Oliver Green =

Author and transport historian

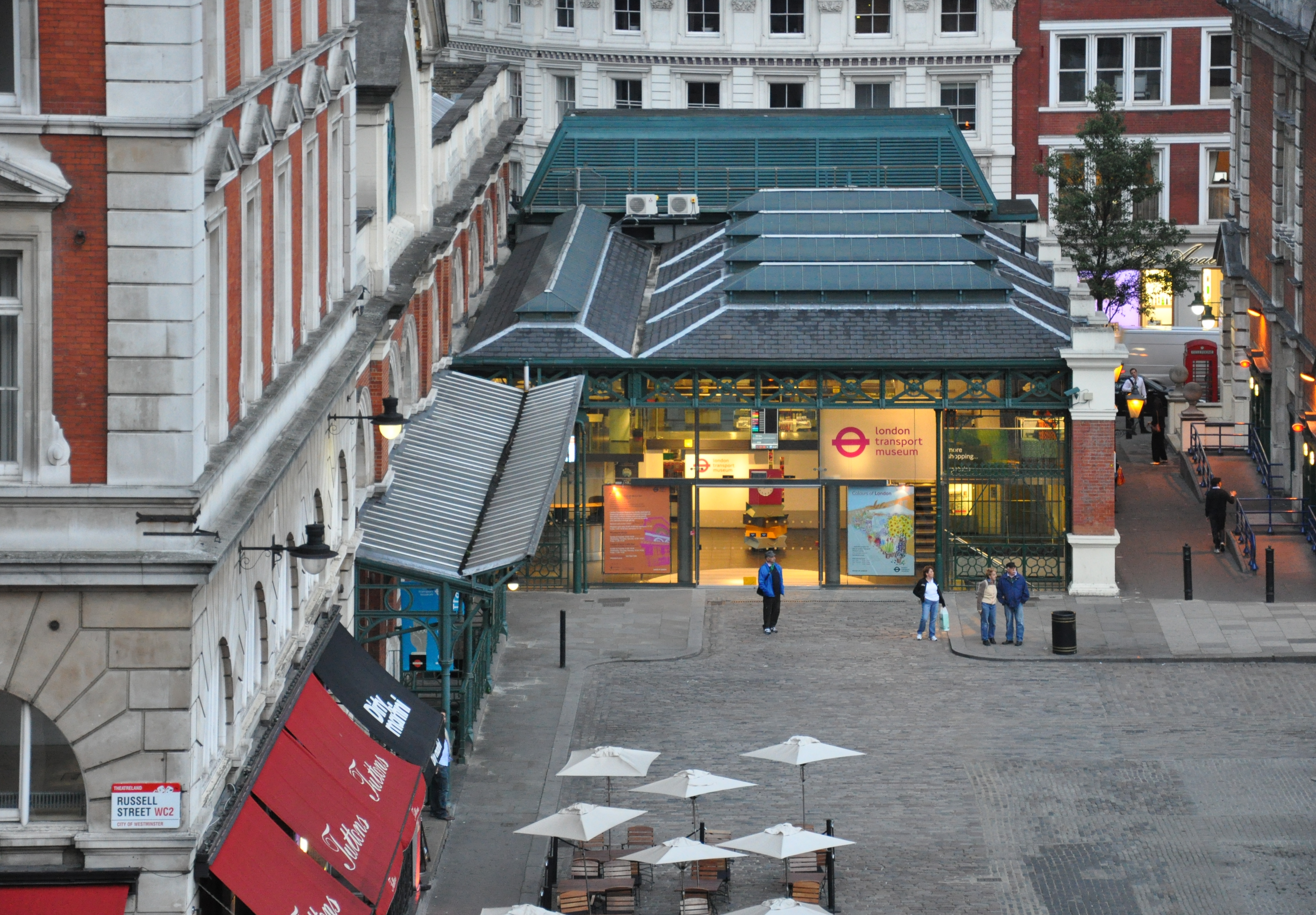
Oliver Green is a research fellow at the London Transport Museum.

Oliver Green (born December 1951) is an author and transport historian who has written widely on the history of public transport in London, and in particular on the art and design of London Transport. He is the former head curator and now research fellow at the London Transport Museum. He lectures at Birkbeck College, University of London, and Gresham College.

== Selected publications ==
=== 1980s ===
- The London Transport golden jubilee book, 1933-1983. Daily Telegraph, London, 1983. ISBN 978-0901684868
- The London Underground: An illustrated history. Ian Allan Publishing, 1987. ISBN 0-7110-1720-4
- Metro-Land: 1932 edition. Oldcastle Books, Harpenden, 1987 (Introduction). ISBN 0-948353-09-0

=== 1990s ===
- Art for the London Underground: London Transport posters 1908 to the present. Rizzoli, New York, 1990. ISBN 9780847811724
- Underground art: London Transport posters, 1908 to the present. Studio Vista, London, 1990. ISBN 9780289800379
- Designed for London: 150 years of transport design. Laurence King, London, 1995. (With Jeremy Rewse-Davies) ISBN 9781856690645

=== 2000s and 2010s ===
- London Transport posters: A century of art and design. Lund Humphries, 2008. (Edited with David Bownes) ISBN 978-0853319849
- Discovering London railway stations. Shire, London, 2010. ISBN 9780747808060
- The tube: Station to station on the London Underground. Shire, London, 2012. ISBN 978-0747812272
- Underground: How the tube shaped London. Allen Lane, London, 2012. (With David Bownes and Sam Mullins) ISBN 978-1846144622
- British aviation posters: Art, design and flight. Lund Humphries, 2012 (With Scott Anthony) ISBN 9781848220843
- Frank Pick's London: Art, design and the modern city. V & A Publishing, London, 2013. ISBN 9781851777570

== See also ==
- Frank Pick
- Johnston (typeface)
