= AEC Swift =

British rear-engined single-decker bus chassis

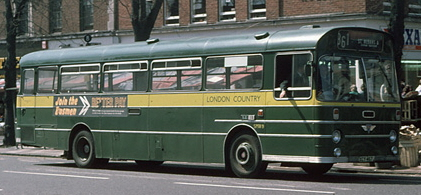
- London Country Bus Services Marshall bodied AEC Swift in St Albans in May 1976

Overview
- Manufacturer: AEC
- Production: 1964–1980
- Assembly: Southall, England

Body and chassis
- Doors: 1 or 2
- Floor type: Step entrance
- Related: Leyland Panther

Powertrain
- Engine: AEC AH505; AEC AH691; AEC AH760
- Capacity: 9.6 litres; 11.3 litres; 12.4 litres

Dimensions
- Length: various
- Width: 2.5 m (8 ft 2 in)
- Height: 3.0 m (9.8 ft)

The AEC Swift was a rear-engined step entrance single-decker bus chassis manufactured by AEC between 1964 and 1980. The chassis design was closely related to the Leyland Panther. It was available in 33-foot (10 m) and 36-foot (11 m) lengths, with an AEC AH505 or AH691 engine.

The design was suitable for driver-only operation which helped bus operators to relieve the problems of labour shortages and high costs, and became one of the alternatives to the British double-decker buses which could only be operated by a driver and conductor, such as the London AEC Routemaster or Bristol Lodekka, as British legislation prevented driver-only operation of double-decker buses until the late 1960s.

== London ==
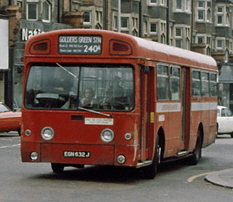
Park Royal Vehicles bodied AEC Swift in Golders Green in April 1978

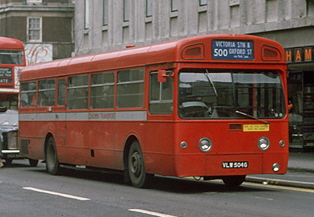
AEC Merlin on Red Arrow route 500 on Oxford Street in 1976

The largest fleet was operated by London Transport and London Country Bus Services, with over 1,500 in total delivered between 1966 and 1972. Bodywork was supplied by Strachans Coachwork (prototypes only), Park Royal Vehicles, Metro Cammell Weymann and Marshall, to basically the same design.

The fleet was made up of a number of variations. The longer 36 ft (11 m) versions were referred to as Merlins, and divided into MB (single or dual door), MBS (dual door), and MBA (dual door with turnstile payment for use on Red Arrow services) classes.

The shorter 33 ft (10 m) versions were known as Swifts. There were three variants of this model upon delivery. In the London central area SM (single door saloon) and SMS (dual door with automatic fare collection) classes were painted red. London Country operated green SM-class dual door, fully seated saloons that had been ordered by London Transport. Subsequently, London Transport converted a number of SMS vehicles to conventional one-man operated saloons by adding more seats and locking the centre exit so it could not be used. These were renamed the SMD class, but retained their original fleet number.

Neither London Transport nor London Country considered either design to be a success and the first examples were withdrawn and sold, many for scrap, in 1972, after just four years service. Most had been replaced by 1981, mainly with Leyland Nationals and MCW Metrobuses.

Some were taken by the Malta Department of Education and remained in their London form apart from a new coat of paint.

== Other operators in the UK ==
AEC Swifts were also sold to several other operators. Over 100 were sold to Leeds City Transport, transferring to West Yorkshire PTE on its formation in 1974. Aberdeen Corporation Transport, Birmingham City Transport and Sunderland Corporation took smaller numbers of Swifts. South Wales Transport ordered 36 in 1971 but they were diverted by the National Bus Company to London Country even though twelve of them had already entered service with South Wales.

Great Yarmouth Transport bought eight Swifts new in 1973; the last of 22 purchased new and three second hand; they continued in service until the late 1990s, and were the last Swifts to run in service with their original operator. Other customers included Blackpool Transport with 55 examples and St Helens Corporation. Three Swifts delivered to Morecambe Corporation in 1970 carried rare Northern Counties bodywork.

Following withdrawal from service with their initial operators, many Swifts were sold on for further use. Staffordshire-based independent Knotty Bus ran a fleet of four Swifts between 1988 and 1995. A small number of former London Transport Swifts ran for a time with Hants & Sussex (now Emsworth & District) on services in south east Hampshire.

British Airways once owned an AEC Swift, with a special body that had an open platform at the front, which was designed for airside duties. Citybus in Belfast purchased 177 Swifts and Merlins between 1977 and 1980 to replace buses destroyed during the Troubles, although most were withdrawn after 1981.

== Exports ==
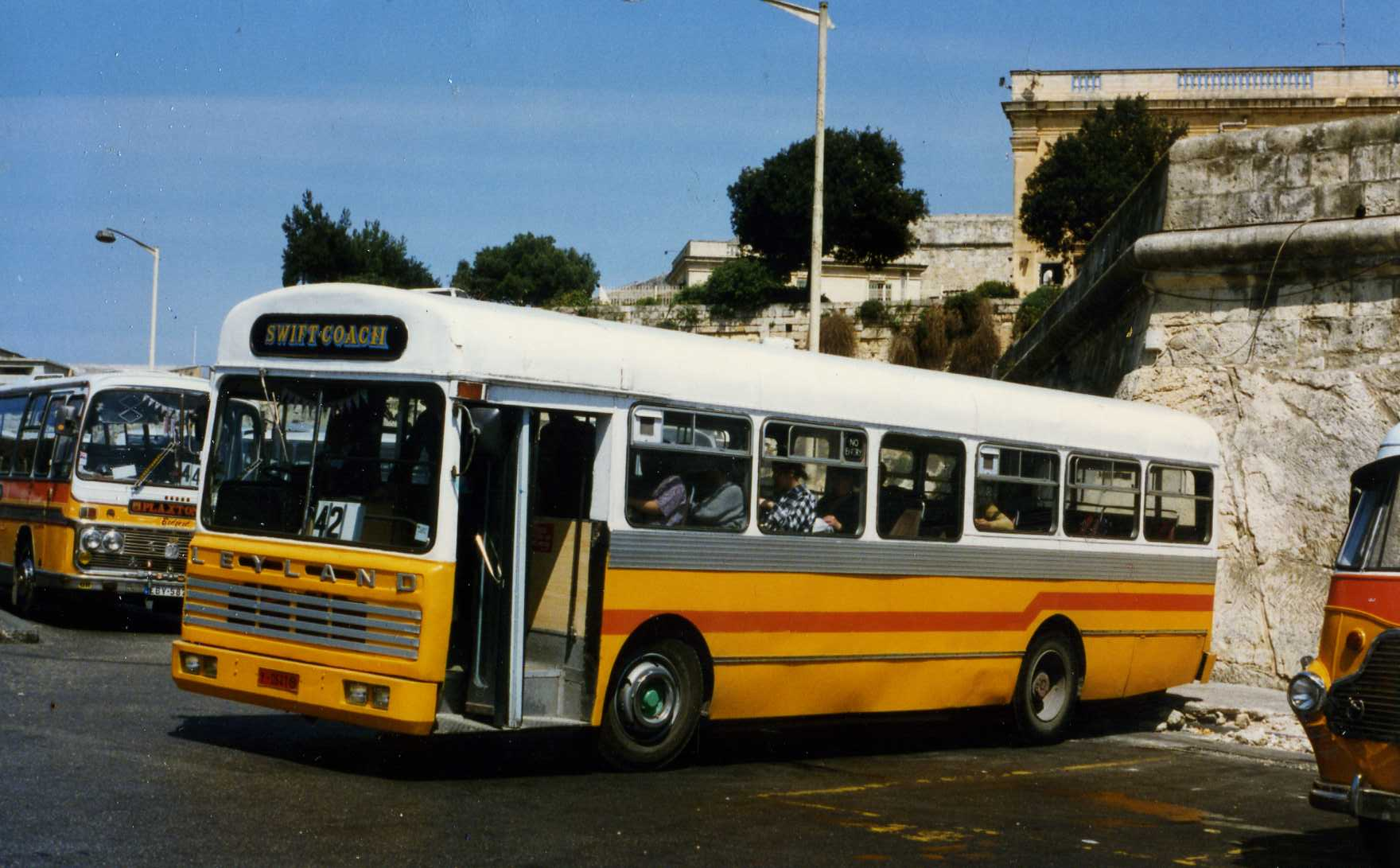
Rebuilt Malta bus AEC Swift in March 1996

AEC Swifts were also sold for the export market, and many were sold abroad after withdrawal. Sixty-five Swifts with bodywork by local builder Bus Bodies were sold to South African operator Durban Transport in 1974.

Australian Capital Territory operator ACTION purchased 101 AH505 powered Swifts between 1967 and 1975. The State Transport Authority of Adelaide, purchased 292 AH691 powered Swifts in 1970-72 followed by 66 AH760 examples in 1978. In 1980/81, twelve AH760 Swifts were bodied by Domino, Pressed Metal Corporation and Pressed Metal Corporation South Australia for Deanes Coaches and West Bankstown Bus Service in Sydney.

Approximately 50 former London Transport Merlins were exported for further use in Australia. Several former London Transport vehicles were sold to Malta bus where, after refurbishment and repowering, they remained in service until 2011. In early 1981, ten Swifts recently withdrawn by London Transport were exported to Italy to act as emergency control centres and shelters in the aftermath of the 1980 Irpinia earthquake.
