= East Lancs Greenway =

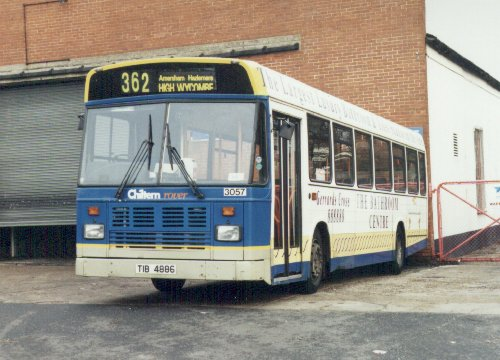
- Chiltern Rover Greenway

Overview
- Manufacturer: East Lancashire Coachbuilders
- Production: 1991-1996

Body and chassis
- Doors: 1-2
- Floor type: Step entrance
- Chassis: Integral

Powertrain
- Engine: Gardner 6HLXB

The East Lancs Greenway, or National Greenway, is a type of bus which is rebuilt by East Lancashire Coachbuilders from a Leyland National single-deck bus.

== History ==
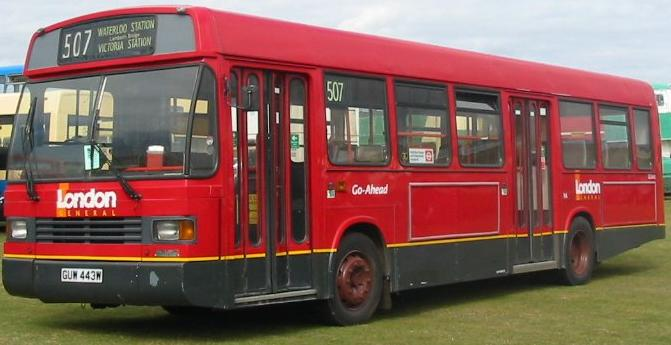
London General Greenway in two-door Red Arrow layout

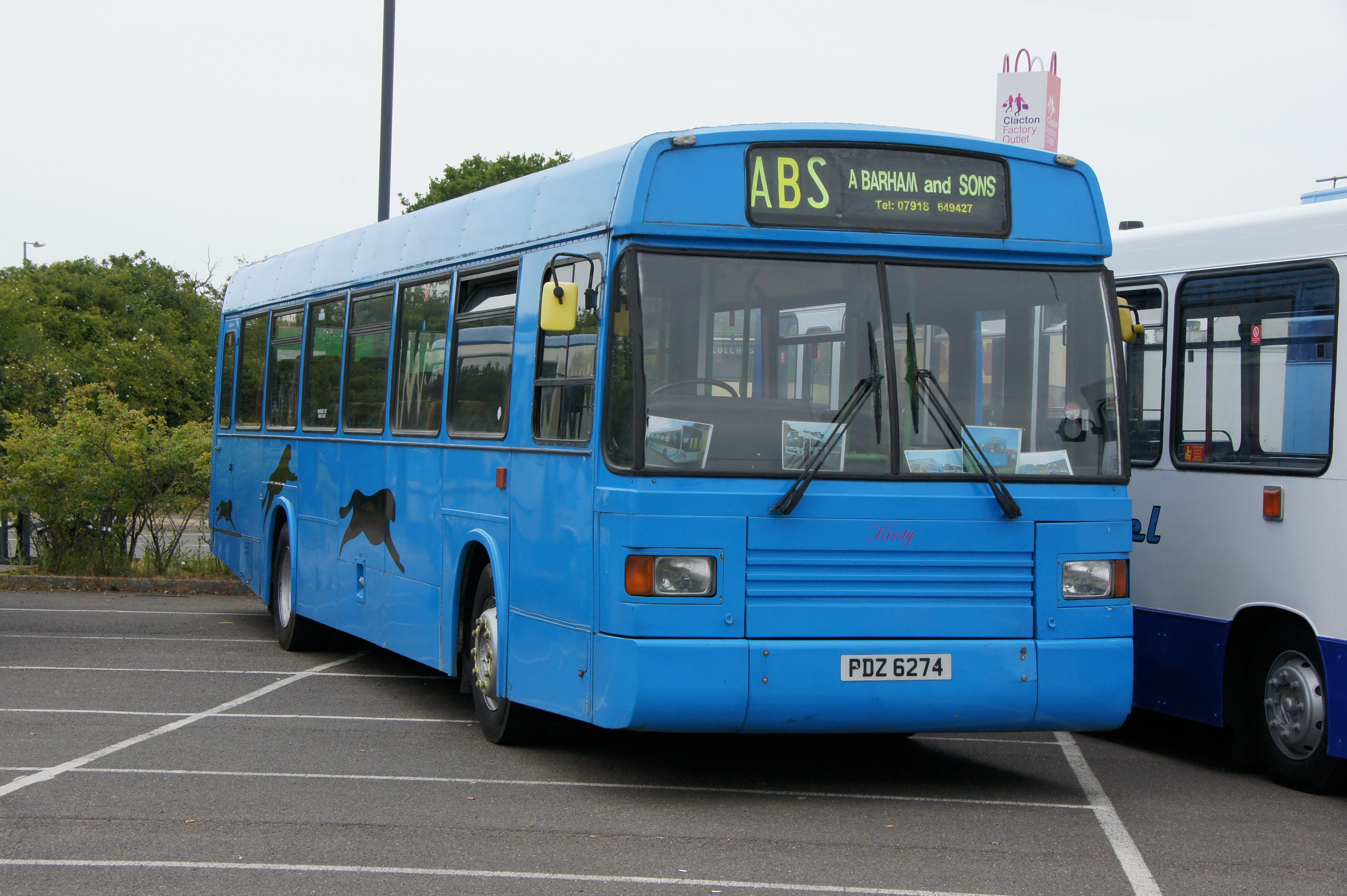
Panther Travel Greenway at Clacton Bus Rally in 2011

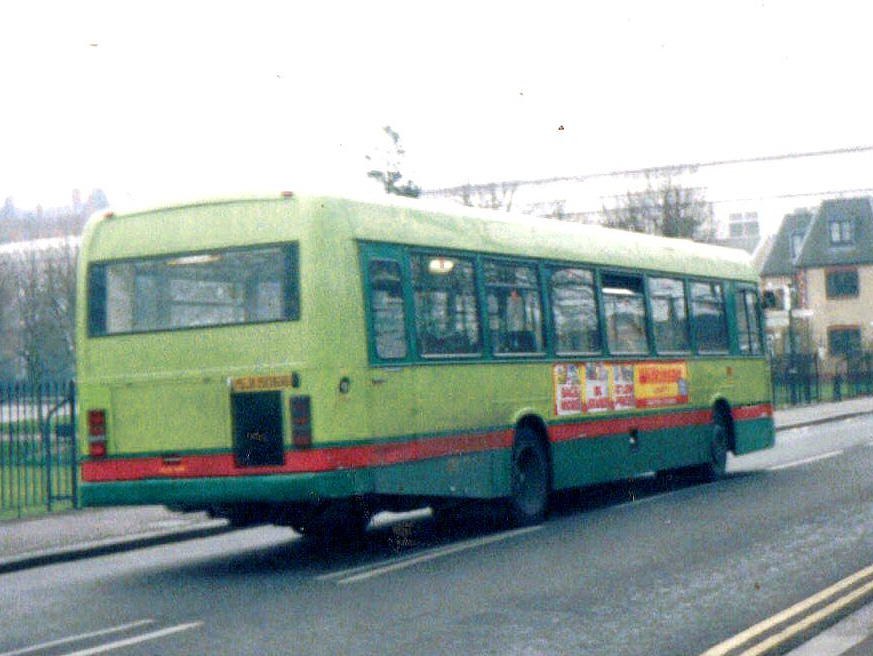
London & Country Greenway rear in Windsor in 1998

The first Greenway appeared in late 1991. It was conceived by London & Country, which at the time was part of the Drawlane Group, which owned East Lancs. L&C began a co-operative venture with East Lancs. The idea was to give some of the Leyland Nationals, of which London & Country still had quite a few, a mid-life rebuild. The engineering work was carried out by London & Country at Reigate, then the buses were sent to Blackburn for the replacement bodywork. Soon East Lancs made the project widespread. Many operators were in the same situation as London & Country. Since the Leyland National had an advanced integral structure which generally remained sound, it was decided that rebuilding was a cost-effective option for them. The project lasted about four years, with the last of the 176 Greenways entering service early in 1996. Another major customer was London General, for the Red Arrow network in Central London.

Many different types of National were included in the rebuilding programme:

- Mk 1 and Mk 2
- 10.3m and 11.3m
- Original, Series A and Series B
- Standard and Suburban Coach variants
- Single- and dual- door

However, apart from the length, these differences between the incoming vehicles made little or no difference to the finished product, since each vehicle was stripped down to the barest rolling shell, which was repanelled and given new windows, front and rear ends, and a complete new interior. The engine was replaced by a horizontally mounted, reconditioned Gardner 6HLXB engine, which was no longer available in new buses as it was non-compliant with new Euro-regulations.

Despite the extensive nature of the rebuilding, vehicles were eligible to retain their original identity, and some did so. However, many operators chose to apply "cherished" registrations (mostly Northern Irish), being reluctant to make it too obvious that what might appear to be a brand new bus, could in fact be anything from nine to 21 years old.

== Appearance ==
The Greenway necessarily retained the basic shape of the Leyland National. The new side windows were of distinctive shape, with square top corners and rounded bottom corners. Plainer panelling was used than on the original National. Most examples were fitted with new doors, with two instead of four leaves. On the roof, the National's familiar "pod", which had housed heating and ventilation equipment, was discarded.

Two distinct designs of front end were fitted. The first had two-piece flat windscreens which met at a slight point in the centre, EL2000-style headlights with separate indicators above, and a shallow, plain bumper. The second (and more common) had a two-piece "barrel" curved windscreen with level top, a slatted grille matching the height of the headlights, indicators in the headlight surrounds, and a noticeably chunkier bumper. Both windscreen styles had quarterlights.

Two distinct designs of rear end were also fitted. The more common was like the EL2000 rear end, having a high-set rear window. The alternative style, used on the London vehicles, had a rear window at approximately the same height as the original, and a space in the bumper for registration plates. Some had the rear route number box under the window, some had an internal box inside the window.

== Naming ==
Although commonly known as just the Greenway, the first example appeared for promotional purposes with National Greenway branding.
