= Maurice Holmes (barrister) =

British barrister

Sir Maurice Andrew Holmes (28 July 1911 – 21 December 1997) was a barrister and Chairman of the London Transport Board from 1965 to 1969.

Holmes attended Felsted School, Essex. During the Second World War he served in the Royal Army Service Corps from 1941 to 1945, achieving the rank of Major. After the war, he was called to the bar at Gray's Inn in 1948 where he practised until 1955.

In 1955, he became a director of Tillings Association Limited and then chairman in 1960, a post he held until 1965 when he became Chairman of the London Transport Board which controlled the London Underground and London's buses. He served as Chairman of the LTB until the end of 1969 when it was replaced by the Greater London Council-controlled London Transport Executive. He then acted as the administrator of the South-eastern Law Circuit until 1974.

Holmes was knighted in 1969.

Business positions
Preceded by Sir Alexander Valentine	Chairman, London Transport Board; 1965–1969	Succeeded by Sir Richard Way; Chairman; London Transport Executive
