= London Transport Executive =

Responsible for public transport in the Greater London area, UK 1948–1962

- Predecessor: London Passenger Transport Board
- Successor: London Transport Board
- Formation: 1 January 1948
- Dissolved: 31 December 1962
- Type: Public body
- Legal status: Dissolved
- Headquarters: 55 Broadway, London
- Region served: Greater London and within 30 miles (48 km) of Charing Cross
- Main organ: London Transport
- Parent organisation: British Transport Commission

The London Transport Executive was the organisation responsible for public transport in Greater London, England between 1948 and 1962. In common with all London transport authorities from 1933 to 2000, the public name and operational brand of the organisation was London Transport.

== Formation ==
On 1 January 1948, pursuant to the Transport Act 1947, the London Passenger Transport Board (LPTB) was nationalised and renamed the London Transport Executive (LTE), becoming a subsidiary organisation of the British Transport Commission, which was formed on the same day. Another subsidiary of the commission was the Railway Executive (which traded as British Railways), which meant that London Transport and the main-line railways were under the same management for the first and last time in their respective histories.

== Projects ==
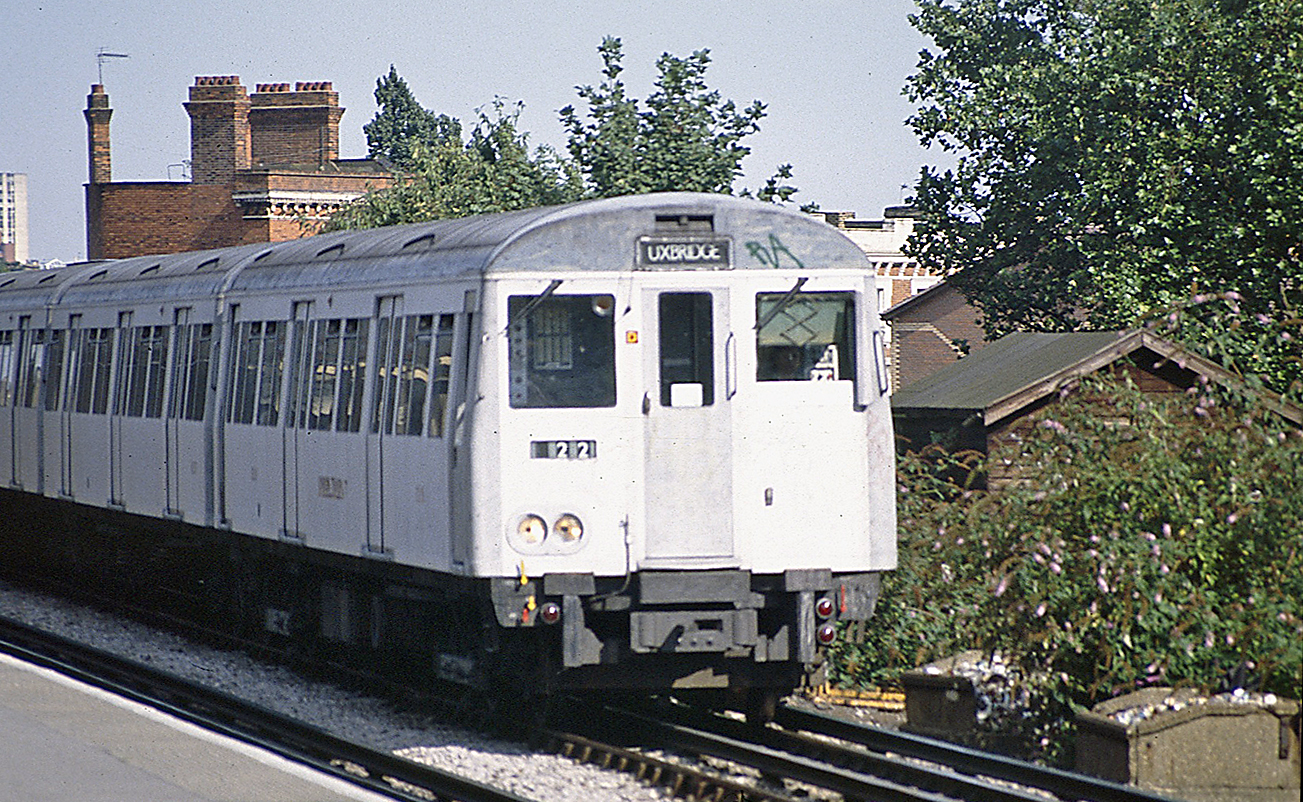
A stock on the Metropolitan line

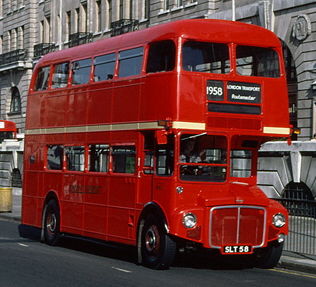
AEC Routemaster

A great deal of the early work of the LTE was spent repairing and replacing stock and stations damaged during World War II. LTE also oversaw the completion of the delayed Central line expansion, which had been part of the 1935–40 New Works Programme begun by the LPTB. By 1949, the westbound extension to West Ruislip and the eastbound extension to Ongar was finished.

The main priority of the BTC was to modernise its main-line railways and many of the uncompleted projects which were part of the New Works programme were postponed or shelved. These included plans to extend the Bakerloo line to Camberwell, and to extend the Northern line to Bushey Heath, linking up the separate branches terminating at Edgware and Mill Hill East in the process. However, this latter scheme (the Northern Heights) was never completed, as the protection of the countryside, under the newly created Green Belt plan, stopped residential building in this area and reduced passenger numbers would not justify the expenditure.

The LTE completed the electrification of the outer sections of the Central line and the Metropolitan line.

On the Central line, steam locomotives were still operating between Greenford and West Ruislip in the west and between Leytonstone and Ongar in the east. Electrification to West Ruislip was completed in 1948, leading to the start of passenger trains, which did not require locomotive changes, on 21 November of that year. On the same day, electrification round the Fairlop loop in the east was completed. And from 25 September 1949, electric tube trains were in operation between Loughton and Epping. This left a steam shuttle service operating between Epping and Ongar, which was not electrified until 18 November 1957. New trains were introduced on the line in 1959.

The modernisation of the Metropolitan line, the final part of the New Works programme which had not been completed or scrapped, was finally given the go-ahead by the BTC in 1956. This consisted of electrification from Rickmansworth to Amersham and Chesham, some station reconstruction and quadruplication, and replacement of the rolling stock. Steam locomotives were fully withdrawn from the underground network on 9 September 1961. By the end of 1962, new A stock trains had replaced all the pre-war stock on the Metropolitan line.

The LTE started direct recruitment in Ireland and the Caribbean in the 1950s.

The LTE oversaw the elimination of London's trams in 1952 and the trolleybus system in 1962. In terms of bus transport, the AEC Routemaster bus was first introduced in 1956.

== Abolition ==
By the late 1950s the BTC was in serious financial difficulties, which were largely due to the economic performance of the railways. It was criticised as an excessively bureaucratic system of administering transport services which had failed to develop an integrated transport system (such as integrated ticketing and timetabling). It was abolished by Harold Macmillan's Conservative government by the Transport Act 1962. This replaced the LTE with the London Transport Board, which was directly accountable to the Ministry of Transport.

== Reuse of name ==
The London Transport Executive was also the title of the arm of the Greater London Council that ran public transport in London between 1970 and 1984.

== Bibliography ==
- Bonavia, Michael R. (1981). British Rail: The First 25 Years. Newton Abbot: David & Charles. ISBN 0-7153-8002-8.
- Cooke, B.W.C., ed. (September 1964). "The Why and the Wherefore: London Transport Board". The Railway Magazine. 110 (761). Westminster: Tothill Press.
- Day, John R.; Reed, John (2008) [1963]. The Story of London's Underground (10th ed.). Harrow: Capital Transport. ISBN 978-1-85414-316-7.
- The Monopolies and Mergers Commission; Eccles, J.D.; Bunting, M.B.; Hammond, E.A.B.; Prest, A.R.; Swayne, Ronald; Wallis, J.J. (February 1984). London Transport Executive: A report on the arrangements made by the Executive for the maintenance of buses and coaches (PDF). London: Her Majesty's Stationery Office. ISBN 0-10-191330-3. Archived from the original on 2 March 2005.

Preceded by London Passenger Transport Board	London public transport authority 1948–1962	Succeeded by London Transport Board
