= London Transport Board =

Operator of public transport in London (1963–1969)

- Predecessor: London Transport Executive
- Successor: London Transport Executive (GLC)
- Formation: 1 January 1963
- Dissolved: 31 December 1969
- Type: Public body
- Legal status: Dissolved
- Headquarters: 55 Broadway, London
- Region served: Greater London and within 30 miles (48 km) of Charing Cross
- Chairman: 1962-65 Alexander Valentine 1965-69 Maurice Holmes
- Main organ: London Transport
- Parent organisation: Government of the United Kingdom

The London Transport Board was the organisation responsible for public transport (except main-line trains) in London, England, and its environs from 1963 to 1969. In common with all London transport authorities from 1933 to 2000, the public name and operational brand of the organisation was London Transport.

== History ==
The London Transport Board (LTB) was established on 1 January 1963 pursuant to the Transport Act 1962 and replaced the London Transport Executive (LTE) upon the dissolution of the British Transport Commission. It was an independent statutory undertaking reporting directly to the Minister of Transport, whose responsibilities were similar to those of the LTE, but with the addition of some railway lines previously the responsibility of British Railways. The first Chairman was Alexander Valentine, who had been the Chairman of the LTE.

The LTB was responsible for the London Underground and for bus and coach services within the London Passenger Transport Area, an area with a radius of about 30 miles from Charing Cross established when the London Passenger Transport Board was formed in 1933.

Services were generally maintained and not cut as elsewhere in the country, as train services were under the Beeching cuts. The board was responsible for the Bus Reshaping Plan in 1966, a comprehensive programme of changes to bus services.

By 1970 the roads in London had become so congested that the Greater London Development Plan included in its scope policy to reduce dependence on the car. On 1 January 1970 responsibility for public transport within Greater London passed to the Greater London Council (GLC) under the Transport (London) Act 1969, with the London Transport brand retained by the GLC. Bus services outside the GLC area and Green Line Coaches were passed to a new company, London Country Bus Services, formed on 1 January 1970 as a subsidiary of the National Bus Company.

== Notes ==
Preceded by London Transport Executive	London public transport authority 1963–1969	Succeeded by London Transport Executive (GLC)
