= AEC Routemaster =

British double-decker bus

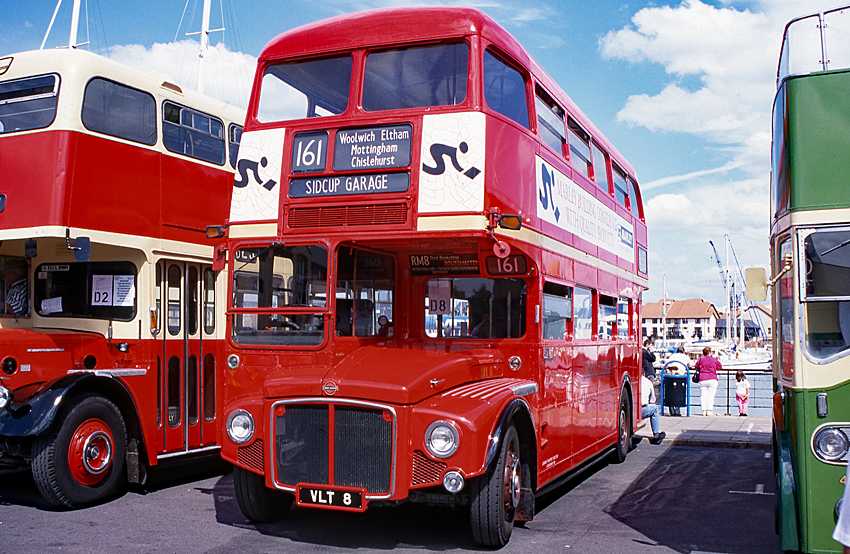
- RM8, first production Routemaster, at a bus rally in 1995

Overview
- Manufacturer: Associated Equipment Company (AEC); Park Royal Vehicles
- Production: 1954–1968
- Assembly: Southall, London Borough of Ealing, England
- Designer: Douglas Scott

Body and chassis
- Layout: Front-engine, rear-wheel-drive
- Doors: 0 passenger doors, 1 permanently-open entrance at the back and 1 driver's door
- Floor type: Step-entrance
- Chassis: Integral, with front and rear subframes

Powertrain
- Engine: AEC AV590 9.6 L or AEC AV690 11.3 L or Leyland O.600 9.8 L 6-cylinder diesel Retrofits: Cummins ISCe/Cummins ISBe; DAF; Iveco; Scania
- Capacity: 57–72 seated
- Power output: 115 hp (86 kW) (AEC AV590)
- Transmission: AEC 4-speed automatic/semi-automatic

Dimensions
- Length: 27 ft 6 in (8.38 m); 30 ft 0 in (9.14 m)
- Width: 8 ft (2.44 m)
- Height: 14 ft 4 1/2 in (4.38 m)
- Kerb weight: 7.35 long tons (7.47 t; 8.23 short tons)

Chronology
- Predecessor: AEC Regent III RT
- Successor: New Routemaster

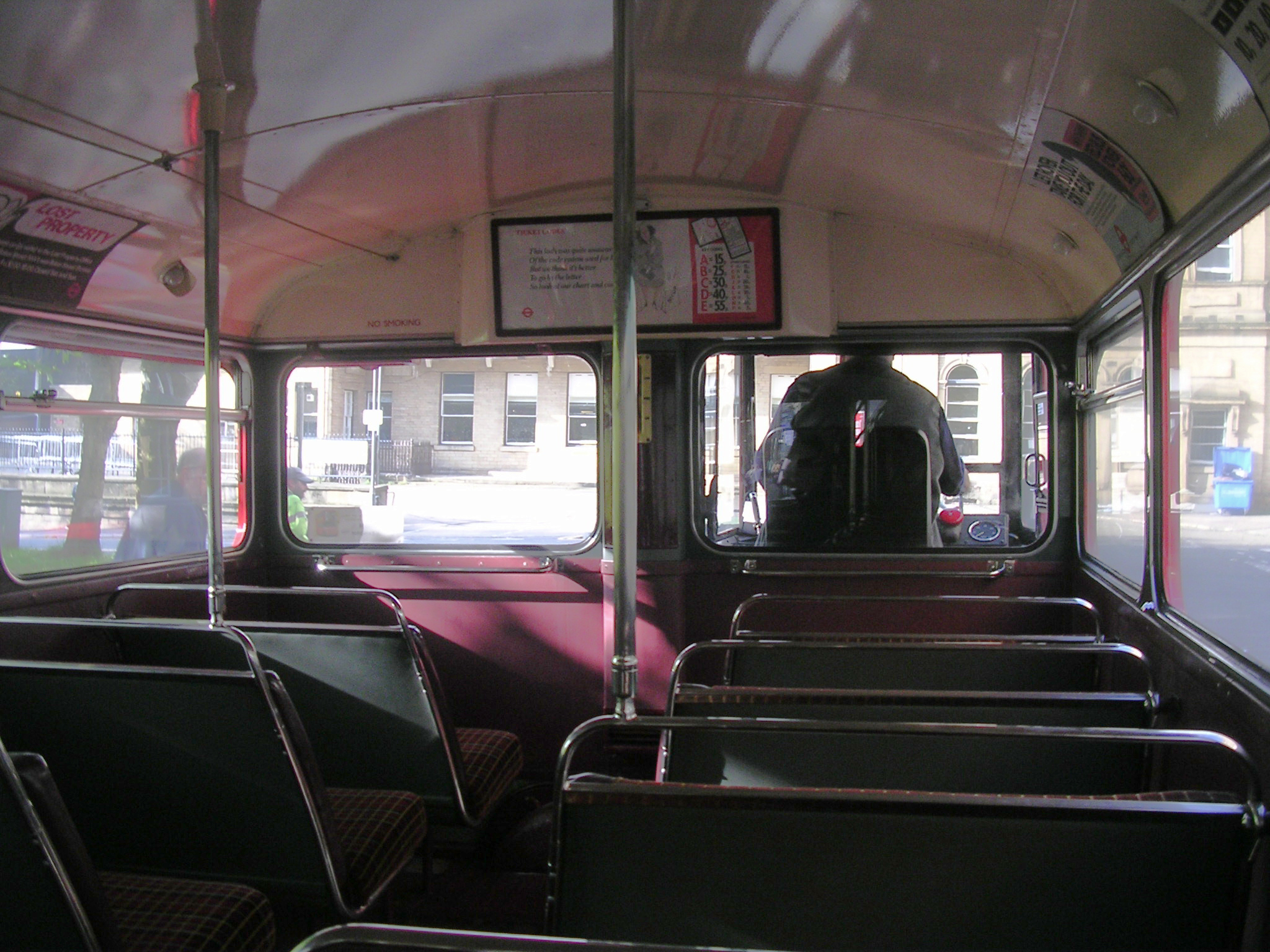
RM1414 lower deck in October 2006

The AEC Routemaster is a front-engined double-decker bus that was designed by London Transport and built by the Associated Equipment Company (AEC) and Park Royal Vehicles. The first prototype was completed in September 1954 and the last one was delivered in 1968. The layout of the vehicle was conventional for the time, with a half-cab, front-mounted engine and open rear platform, although the coach version was fitted with rear platform doors. Forward entrance vehicles with platform doors were also produced as was a unique front-entrance prototype with the engine mounted transversely at the rear.

The first Routemasters entered service with London Transport in February 1956 and the last were withdrawn from regular service in December 2005, although two TfL heritage routes were subsequently operated by Routemasters in central London until 2019.

Most Routemasters were built for London Transport, although small numbers were built for British European Airways and the Northern General Transport Company. A total of 2,876 Routemasters were built, of which 1,230 are still in existence as of September 2024.

A pioneering design, the Routemaster outlasted several of its replacement types in London, survived the privatisation of the former London Transport bus operators and was used by other operators around the UK. In modern UK public transport bus operation, the old-fashioned features of the standard Routemaster were both praised and criticised. The open platform, while exposed to the elements, allowed boarding and alighting in places other than official stops; and the presence of a conductor allowed minimal boarding time and optimal security, but with greater labour costs. Compared to modern buses, the high floor design was inaccessible for disabled people, and made boarding with heavy luggage or pushchairs challenging.

In 2006, the Routemaster was voted one of Britain's top 10 design icons which included Concorde, the Mini, the Supermarine Spitfire, the London tube map, the World Wide Web and the K2 telephone box. In 2009, the Routemaster was selected by the Royal Mail for their "British Design Classics" commemorative postage stamp issue. In the late 2000s, work began on a New Routemaster bus inspired by the Routemaster's traditional design. It entered service in February 2012.

== Design ==
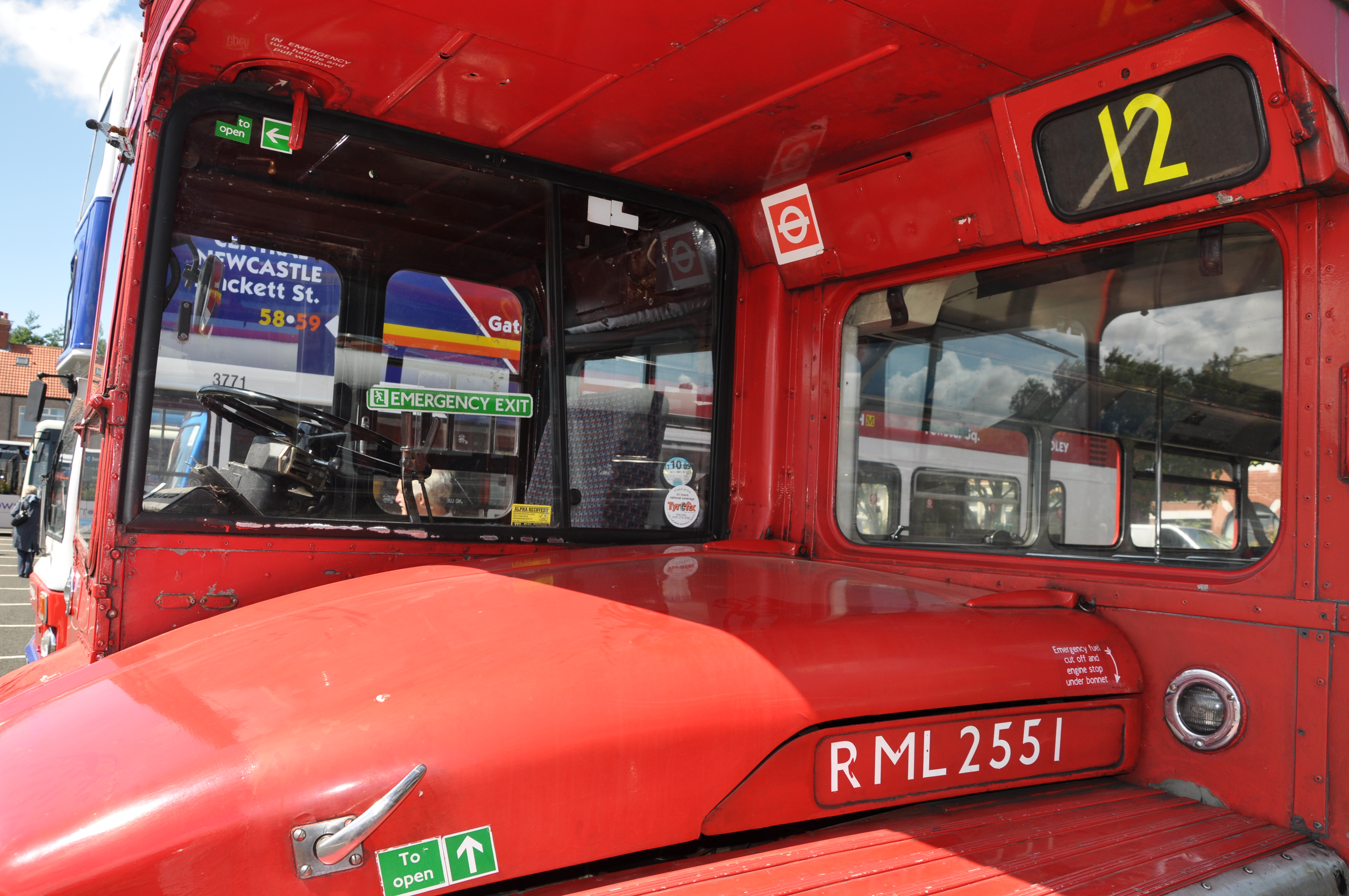
Driver's cab of RML2551

The Routemaster was developed between 1947 and 1956 by a team directed by AAM Durrant and Colin Curtis, with vehicle styling by Douglas Scott. The design brief was to produce a vehicle that was lighter (hence more fuel-efficient), easier to operate and that could be maintained by the existing maintenance practices at the recently opened Aldenham Works, but with easier and lower-cost servicing procedures. The resulting vehicle seated 64 passengers, despite being three-quarters long ton (0.84 short tons; 0.76 t) lighter than buses in the RT family, which seated 56.

The first task on delivery to service was to replace London's trolleybuses, which had themselves replaced trams, and to begin to replace the older types of diesel bus. The Routemaster was designed by London Transport and constructed at Park Royal Vehicles, with the running units provided by its sister company AEC. Both companies were owned by Associated Commercial Vehicles, which was taken over by Leyland Motors in 1962.

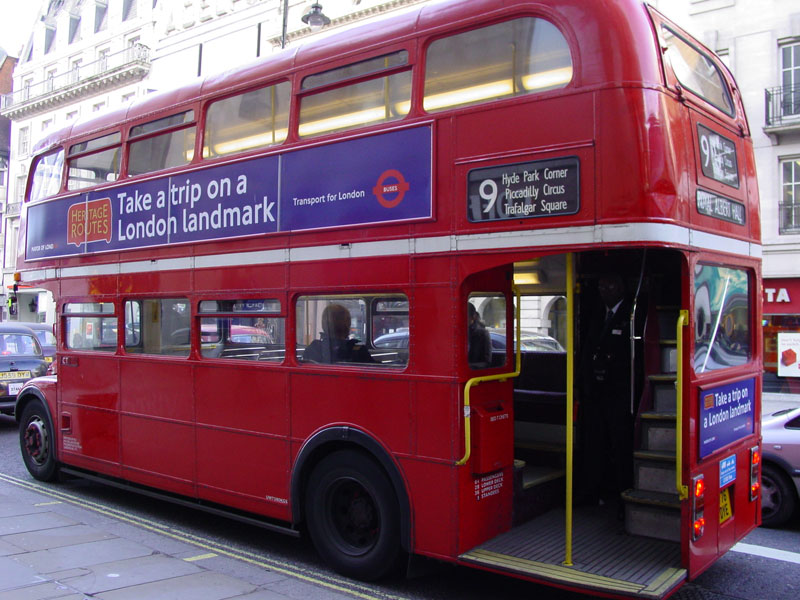
Rear platform of a Routemaster, with updated hand-rails for Heritage Route operation, pictured in 2005

It was an innovative design and used lightweight aluminium along with techniques developed in aircraft production during World War II. As well as a novel, weight-saving integral design, it also introduced for the first time on a bus independent front suspension, power steering, a fully automatic gearbox and power-hydraulic braking. This surprised some early drivers, who found the chassis unexpectedly light and nimble compared with older designs, especially as depicted on film on tests at the Chiswick Works skid pan. Footage of RM200 undergoing the skid test at Chiswick was included in the 1971 film On the Buses.

The Routemaster was a departure from the traditional chassis/body construction method. It was one of the first "integral" buses, with a combination of an "A" steel sub-frame (including engine, steering and front suspension) and a rear "B" steel sub-frame (carrying rear axle and suspension), connected by an aluminium body. The gearbox was mounted on the underside of the body structure with shafts to the engine and back axle. Later pre-war London trolleybuses, however, had previously adopted chassisless construction.

== Prototypes ==
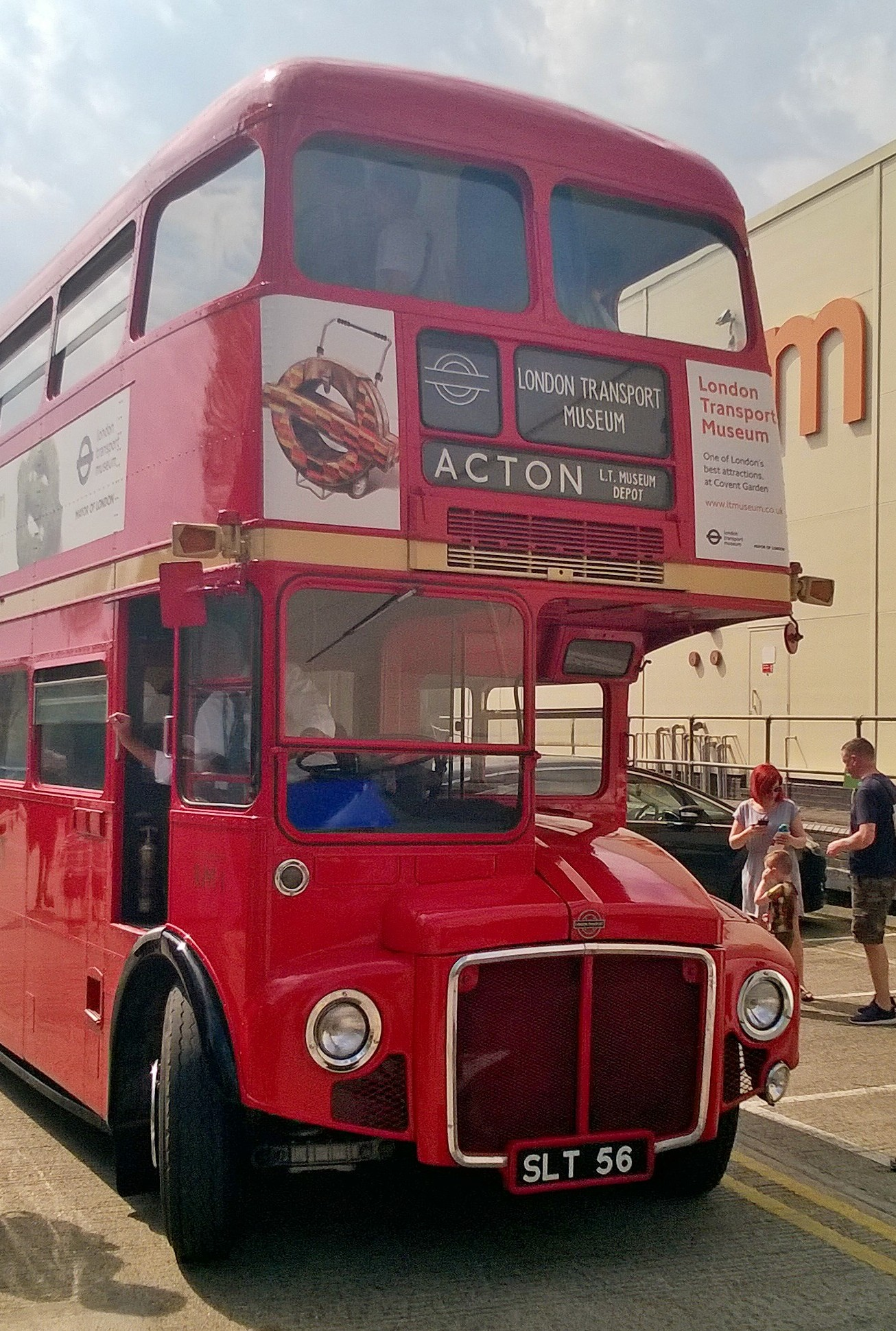
RM1 at the London Transport Museum Depot in 2018; this vehicle was originally built with a different front end, before being fitted with the standard design in 1958.

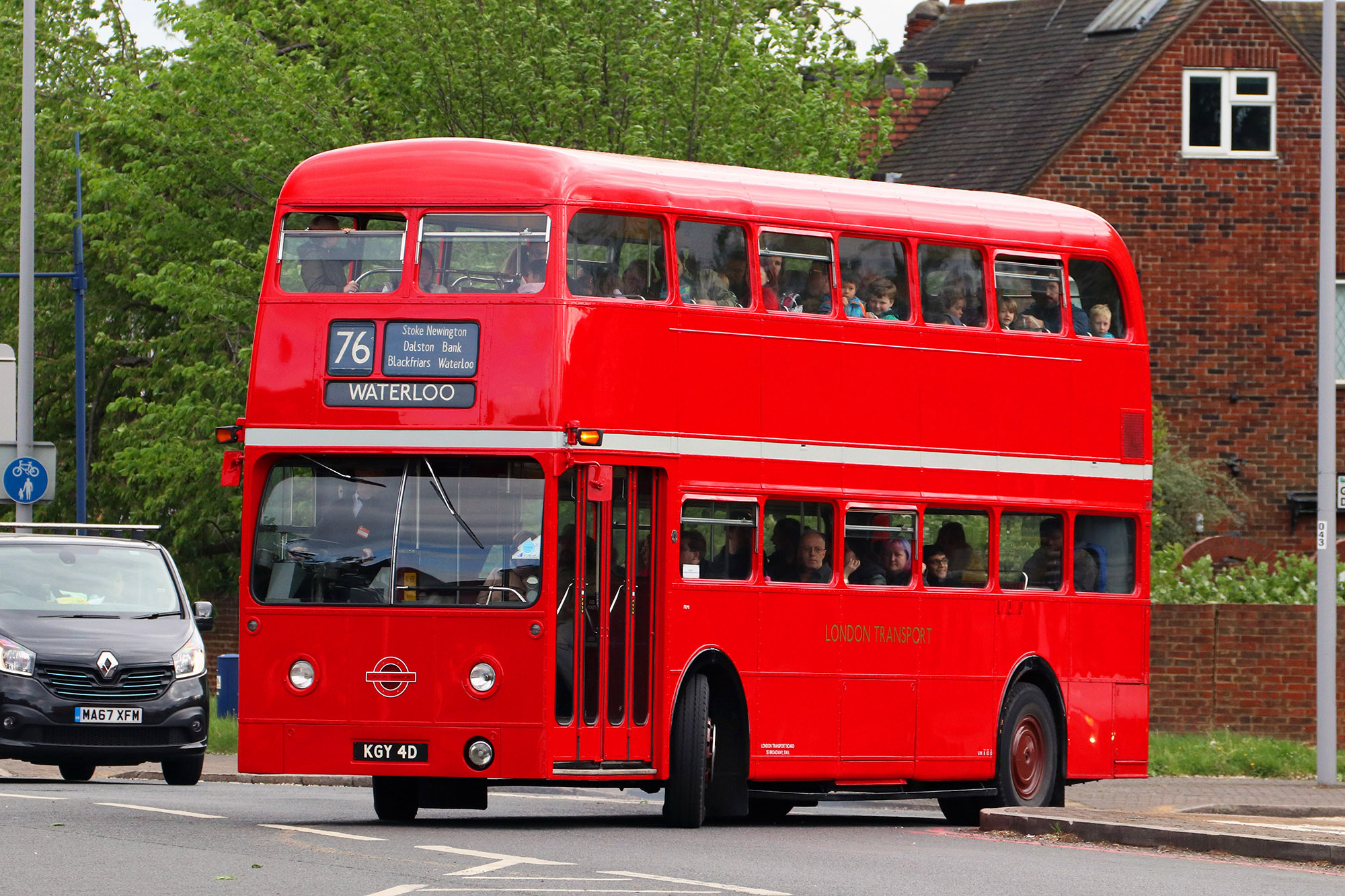
FRM1, the rear-engined Routemaster prototype, in April 2019

London Transport placed four prototype Routemasters in service between 1956 and 1958. The first two were built at the London Transport works at Chiswick, the third by Weymann at Addlestone and the fourth, an experimental Green Line coach, at Eastern Coach Works at Lowestoft. The third and fourth had Leyland engines and mechanical units. The Routemaster was first exhibited at the Earl's Court Commercial Motor Show in 1954, and the first bus went into public service on 8 February 1956.

In 1961, 24 longer Routemaster Lengthened (RMLs) (30 ft [9.14 m] compared with the standard 27 ft 6 in [8.38 m]) were built as a test, going into production from 1965. In 1962, the front entrance concept was tried, with Routemaster Front Entrance (RMF)1254 based on the trial RMLs. This was exhibited and toured, leading to the production of a small number of RMF and Routemaster Airways (RMA) buses.

In 1964, just before commencement of mainstream production of the RML, the final front-engined Routemasters, AEC started work on a front-entrance, rear-engined prototype, FRM1. Completed in 1966, it saw regular London service, then it was reallocated onto London Coaches tour operations until it was eventually withdrawn in 1983 and donated to the London Transport Museum. It was nicknamed the 'Fruitmaster'.

== Production ==
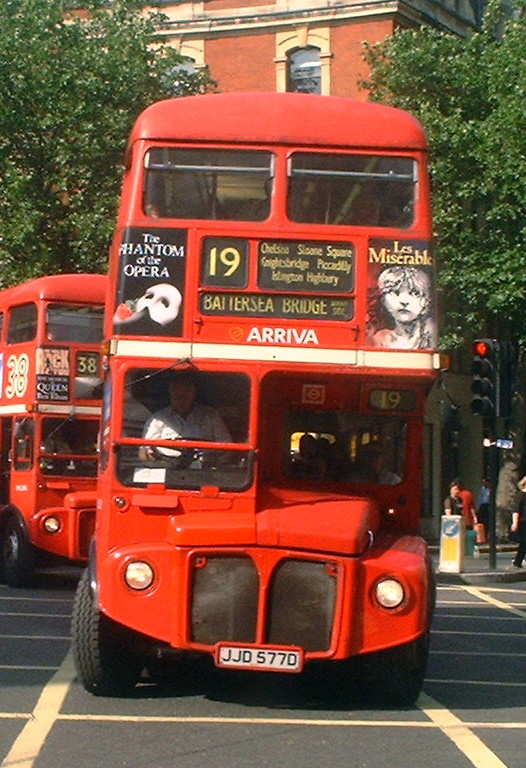
Arriva London RMLs on routes 19 & 38 at the intersection of Tottenham Court Road & Shaftesbury Avenue in August 2004

Production of mechanical components was undertaken chiefly at AEC's Southall site (though a significant number had Leyland engines) with body construction and final assembly at Park Royal Vehicles.

Although regulations already permitted 2-axle double deck buses up to 30 feet (9.14 metres) in length by the time the Routemaster went into full production, the majority of production examples were 27 feet 6 inches (8.38 metres) long, the introduction of 29 feet 11 inches (9.12 metres) "long" types being delayed by union resistance to the extra work for conductors.

Class	Type	Headlights	Length	Number	Notes
RM	standard bus; rear staircase; open rear entrance	Single	27.5 feet (8.38 m)	2,123	
RML	long bus; rear staircase; open rear entrance	Single	29.91 feet (9.12 m)	524	
RMC	standard coach; rear staircase; doored rear entrance	Twin	27.5 feet (8.38 m)	69	
RCL	long coach; rear staircase; doored rear entrance	Twin	29.91 feet (9.12 m)	43	
RMF	long bus; front staircase; front entrance doors	Single	29.91 feet (9.12 m)	51	all except one for Northern General Transport Company
RMA	standard coach; front staircase; front entrance doors	Twin	27.5 feet (8.38 m)	65	for British European Airways and used with a luggage trailer
FRM	stretched bus; front staircase; front entrance doors	Single	31.3 feet (9.54 m)	1	new shaped rear engined single operator prototype

=== RM & RML class ===
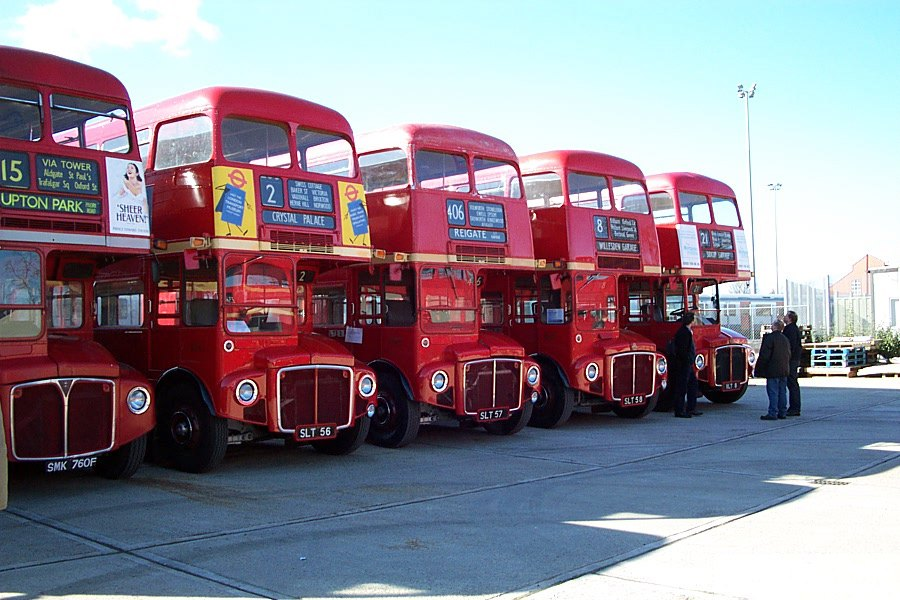
Last built RML2760 with prototypes RM1, RM2 & RML3 at Acton in March 2002

London Transport took delivery of 2,123 RMs and 524 RMLs. The RML was a standard RM with a distinctive and seemingly out of place half-window section added in the middle giving eight extra seats. This was not a dramatic change, as it took advantage of the modular design approach of the Routemaster that would be copied by other manufacturers. The RML code was originally used to identify the "Routemaster Leyland", with what became the RML originally designated the ER (Extended Routemaster). The RM and RML had an area beneath the rear staircase where, when not collecting fares, the conductor could stand without obstructing boarding/alighting passengers. Seating was provided for 64 passengers on RMs (72 on RMLs).

=== RMC & RCL class ===
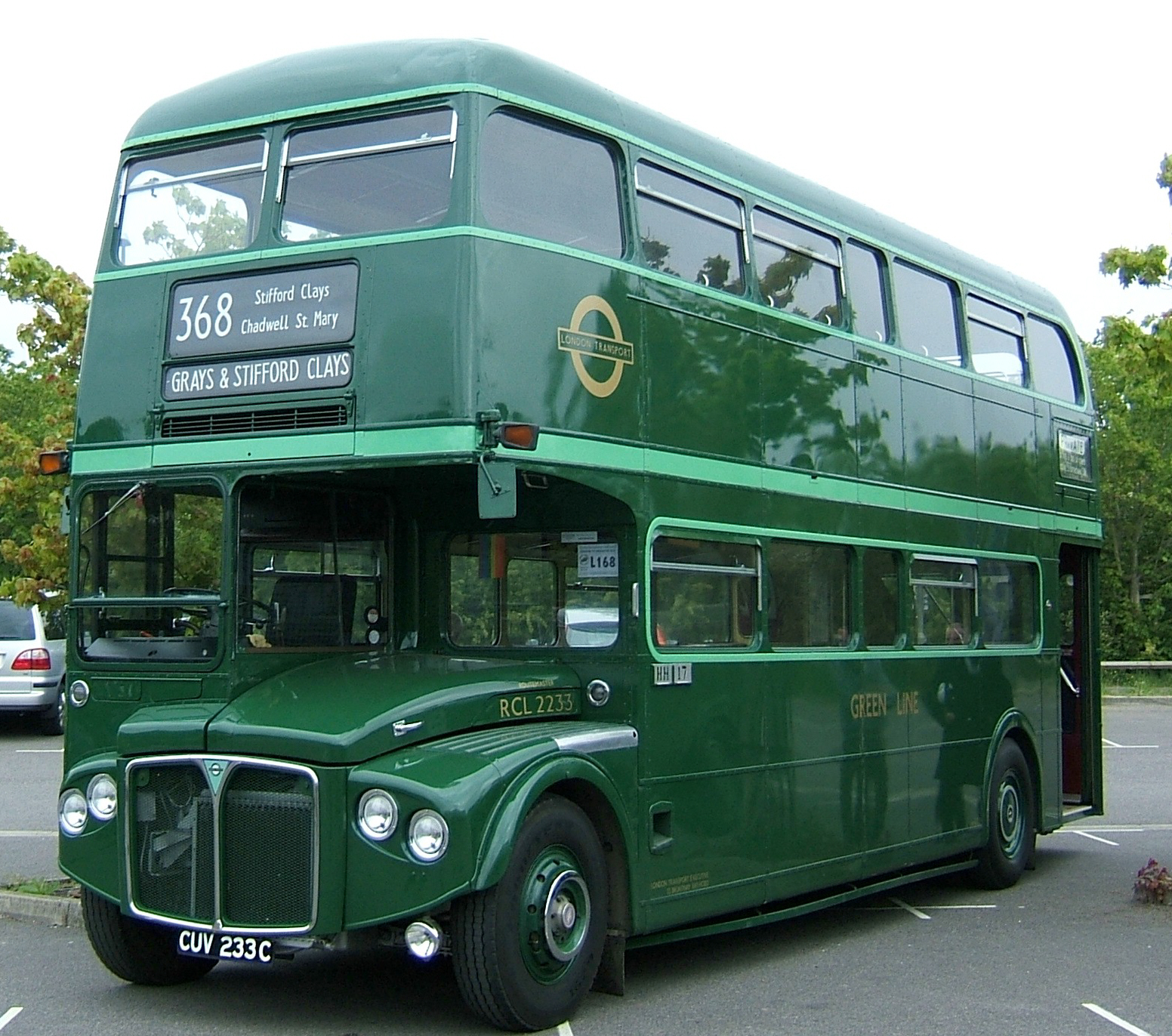
Preserved RCL2233 in London Transport Green Line livery

The RMC was a coach version for Green Line routes. RMCs had modified suspension and interiors to allow a longer range and more comfortable running, an electrically operated door instead of an open platform, and a semi-automatic gearbox with higher gear ratios. The RCL was a long version of the RMC with a larger engine and similar coach-style features. Seating was provided for 57 on RMCs and 65 on RCLs.

=== RMF & RMA class ===
The RMF and RMA class were production versions of the front entrance Routemaster, primarily for non-London and airline use. Like the RMC/RCL they had an electrically operated door, but at the front of the bus, along with the staircase. After being exhibited and demonstrated to other operators, the RMF attracted little interest, apart from an order from Northern General Transport Company (RMF) and, in a short version, from British European Airways (RMA).

==== Northern General ====
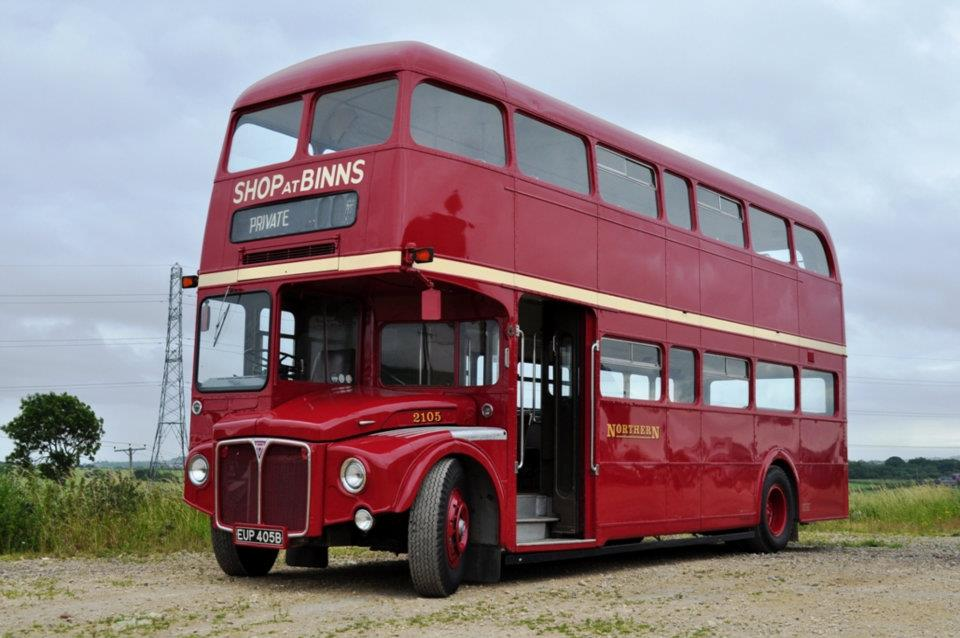
Preserved Northern General Transport Company 2105 in livery as delivered

The British Electric Traction subsidiary Northern General Transport Company introduced the RMF in 1964/65, with an initial batch of 18, followed by another 32 and later joined by the prototype RMF1254. This order created considerable interest and raised eyebrows within the bus industry, as Northern had been one of the biggest investors in the new rear-engined Leyland Atlanteans.

However, Northern shared many routes with the United Automobile Services, which operated the Bristol Lodekka, and the Atlantean did not match their performance and passenger satisfaction, so Northern brought in the RMFs as a better match. They were fitted with Leyland engines and a higher-ratio rear axle for operation on longer trunk routes. Other notable differences were a standard, single-panel front destination blind, sliding windows and a one-piece driver's windscreen.

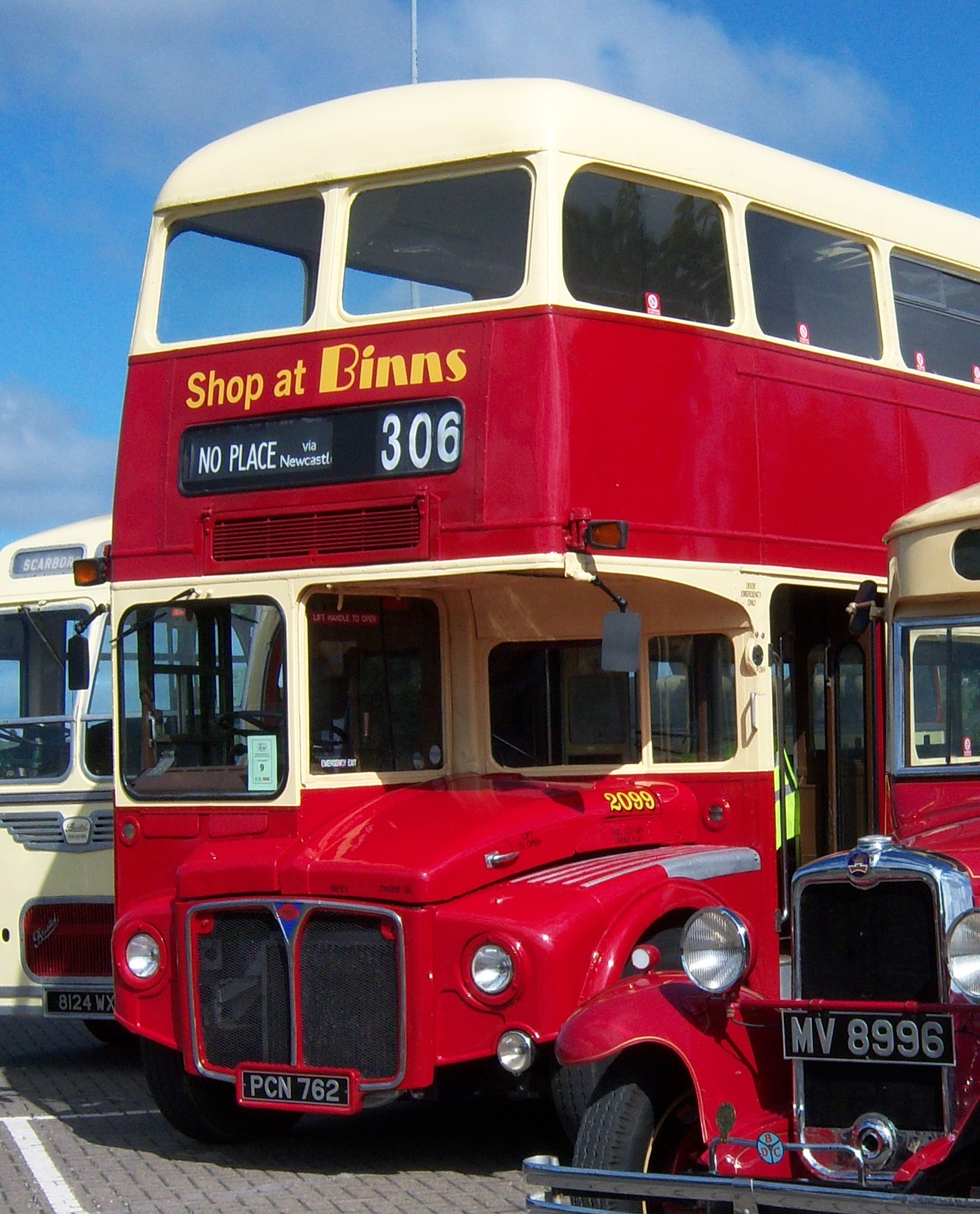
Preserved Northern General Transport Company 2099 in red and cream pre National Bus Company livery

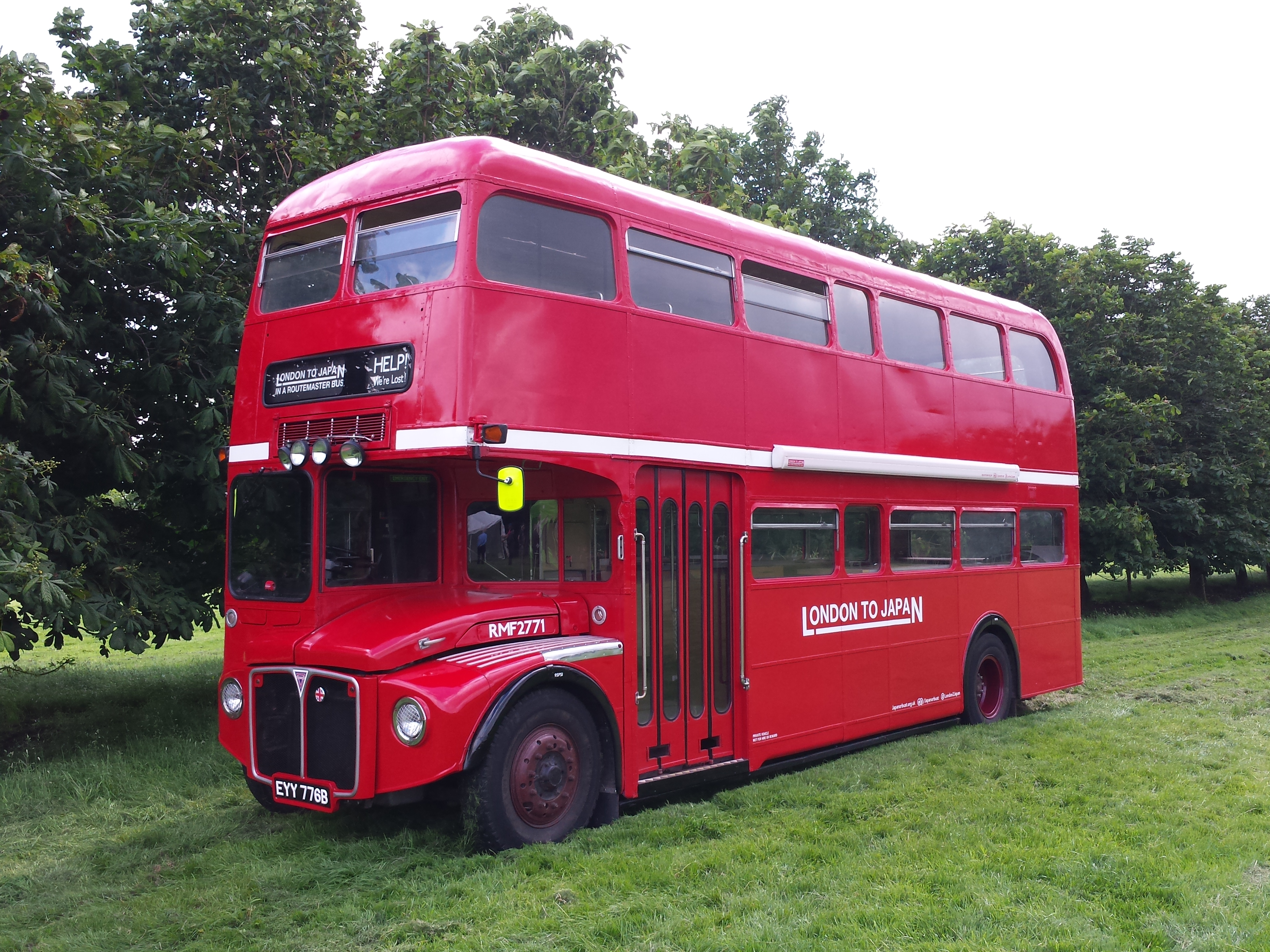
Modified Northern General Transport Company 2101 originally RCN701 (Beatrix – EYY 776B)

They operated in various Northern red and cream liveries, receiving the poppy red corporate livery and NBC Northern fleetnames in the National Bus Company era. The RMF fleet wore the long-standing adverts characteristic of buses in the north-east of England, "Shop at Binns". Northern Routemasters were well liked by their crews: the high axle ratio meant a good turn of speed on long-distance routes such as Newcastle to Darlington, and power steering was well appreciated on busy urban services in Gateshead and Sunderland. Their service in the north also produced the odd sight of a Routemaster with a rollsign "X1 Scandinavia", connecting with the DFDS ferry from North Shields to Scandinavia.

However, throughout the 1970s it became increasingly uneconomic to have conductors on inter-urban services. Despite driver and customer satisfaction, Northern had little option but to replace them. Northern placed a large order for Bristol VRs with Eastern Coach Works and Willowbrook bodywork in 1977 to replace them. Withdrawals began in May 1977 with the last withdrawn in October 1980. Most were scrapped although 14 were sold to London Transport. Only one entered service, as an open-top with London Coaches.

==== British European Airways ====
British European Airways purchased 65 RMAs, geared for 70 mph (110 km/h) running on the M4 motorway and featuring luggage trailers, between 1966 and 1967 for use on its airport bus service between the West London Air Terminal and Heathrow Airport, replacing one-and-a-half decker AEC Regal IV coaches. Withdrawals of the BEA Routemasters started in January 1975, with British Airways discontinuing the service in March 1979 after the opening of the Heathrow branch of the Piccadilly line. All 65 of these Routemasters were eventually sold to London Transport.

== Safety ==
The open platform could be dangerous, as passengers could board, alight, and stand on the platform at any time, even with the bus travelling at speed. Because of this, people could fall and seriously injure themselves. The presence of a conductor to regulate access to the platform helped improve safety, but the conductor also had to collect fares throughout the bus, and even if on the platform could not prevent all incidents. Former London mayor Ken Livingstone said in 2013 that the Routemasters were too dangerous, with around 12 people a year losing their lives after falling from them during his mayoralty.

== Colour schemes ==
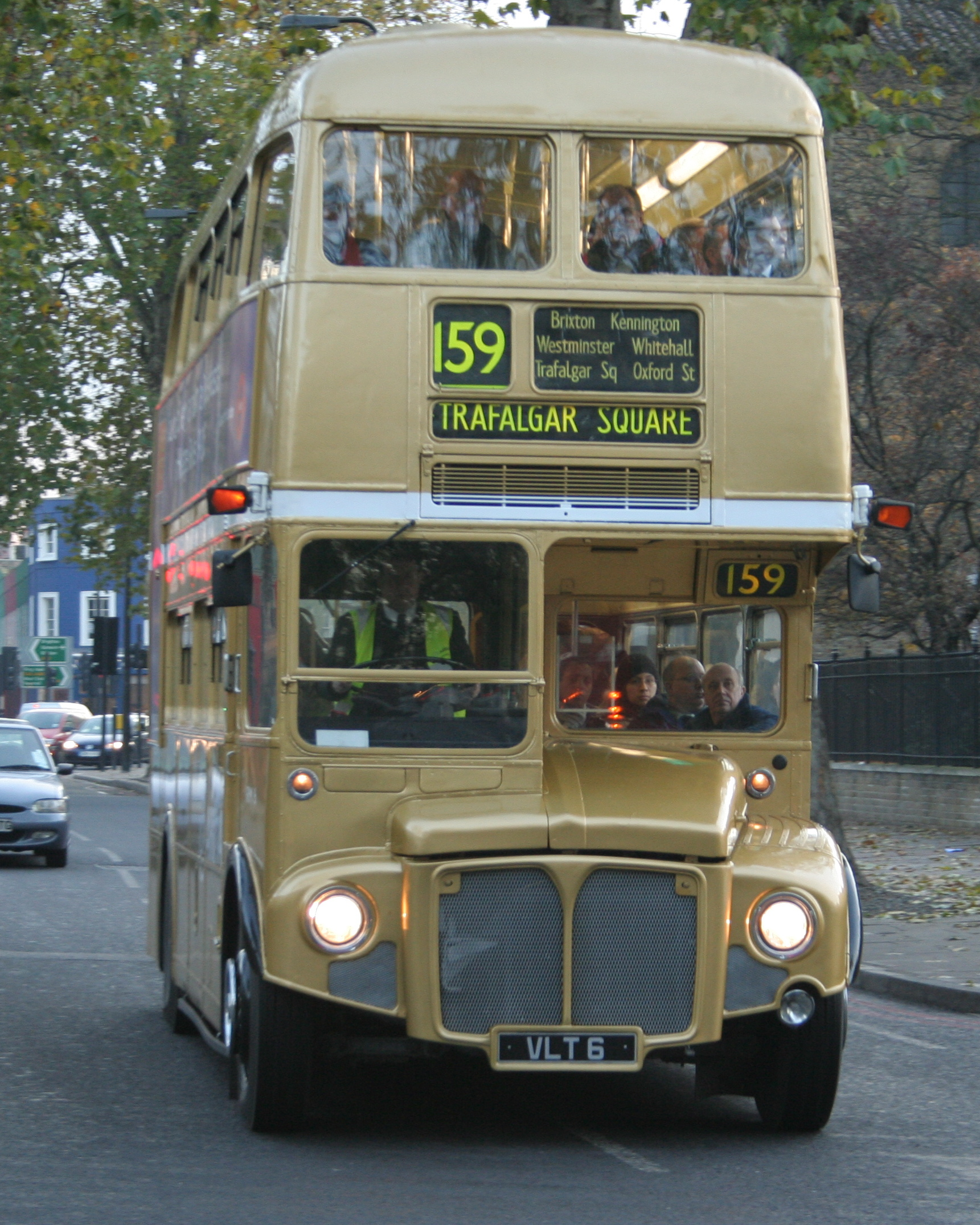
RM6 on route 159 in December 2005 in Golden Jubilee colours

With the Routemaster's longevity, examples were painted to celebrate both the Queen's Silver and Golden Jubilees. In 1977, 25 Routemasters were painted silver and temporarily renumbered SRM1 to SRM25 to celebrate the Silver Jubilee and, in 2002, 50 buses were painted gold including three RMs and 12 RMLs.

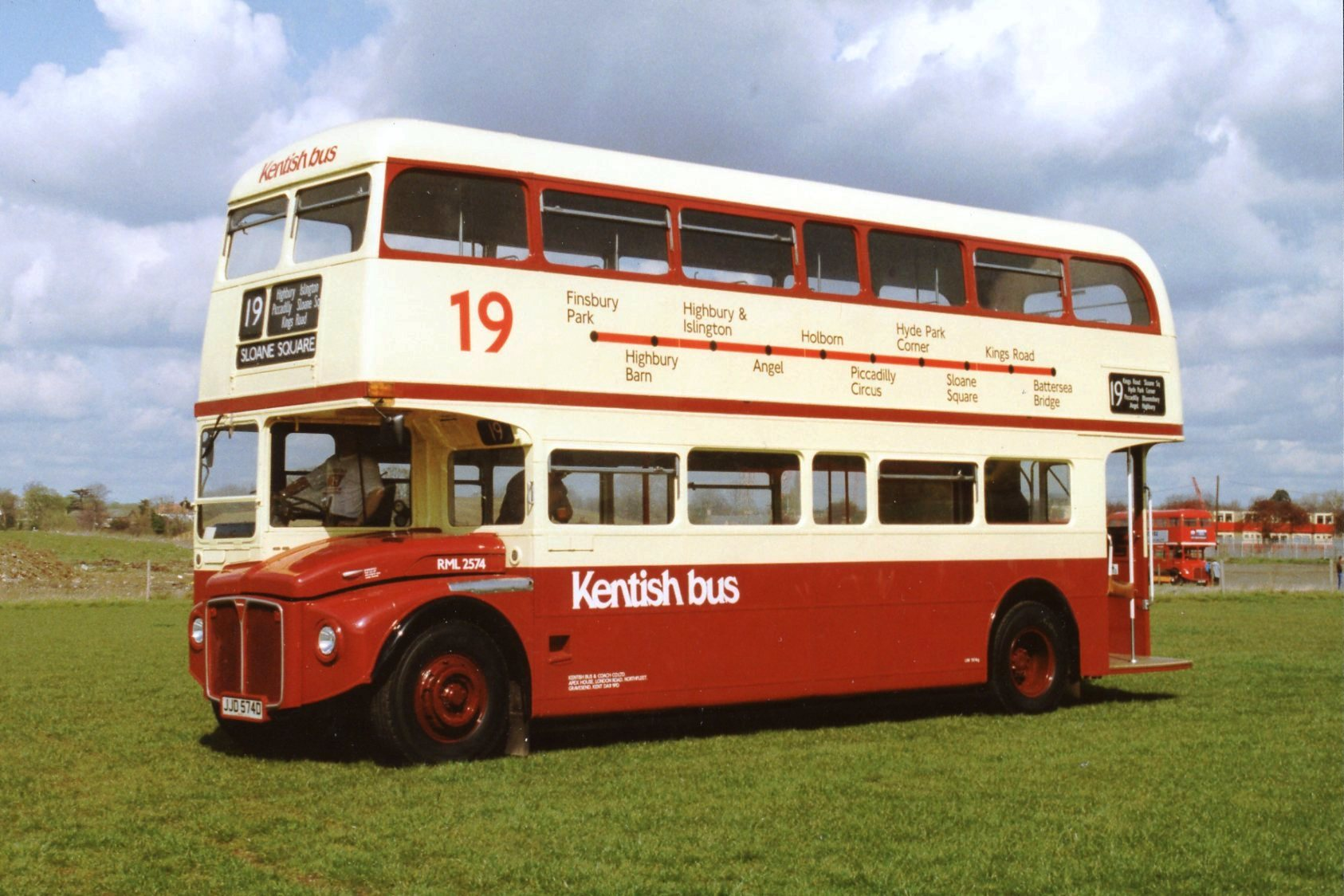
Kentish Bus RML2574 in July 1993

During privatisation in London from 1986, several private operators won contracts to operate services, including Routemaster-operated routes. Before an 80% red rule for liveries was introduced in 1997 by London Transport, the contract tendering authority, some of these new entrants ran Routemasters in non-red liveries, most notably Kentish Bus on route 19 and Borehamwood Travel Services on route 13.

The Routemaster appealed to the many new operators outside London that appeared post-1986 in the UK following bus deregulation. Several traditional operators purchased second-hand Routemasters as a cheap way of expanding their fleets in response to competition from new operators after deregulation, and new operators also chose it as a distinctive-looking bus. Painted in a variety of colours, they were used in regular service in Bedford, Blackpool, Burnley, Carlisle, Corby, Doncaster, Dundee, Glasgow, Hull, Manchester, Perth, Rotherham. Scarborough, Southampton and Southend-on-Sea.

One of the earliest examples, if not the earliest, of deregulated use of Routemasters was early in the history of the Stagecoach Group, by 2014 one of the largest operators in the UK. Stagecoach used vintage Routemasters in its new corporate livery of all-over white with red, orange and blue stripes, to start one of its first operations, Magic Bus, in Glasgow in the late 1980s.

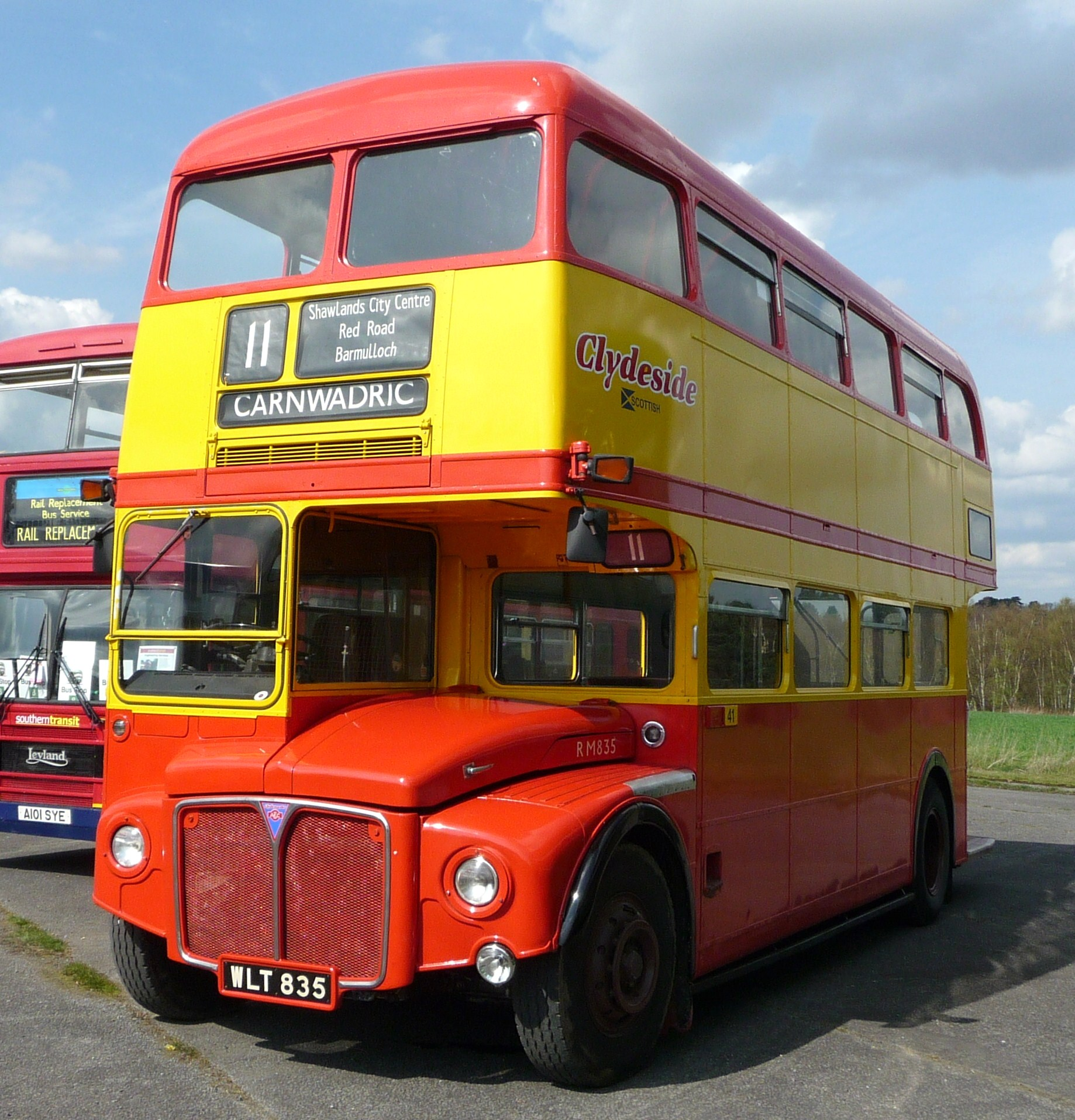
Clydeside Scottish RM720

In the mid-1980s Clydeside Scottish purchased 114 Routemasters for use in Glasgow, with many repainted at Aldenham Works. Most were withdrawn in 1990.

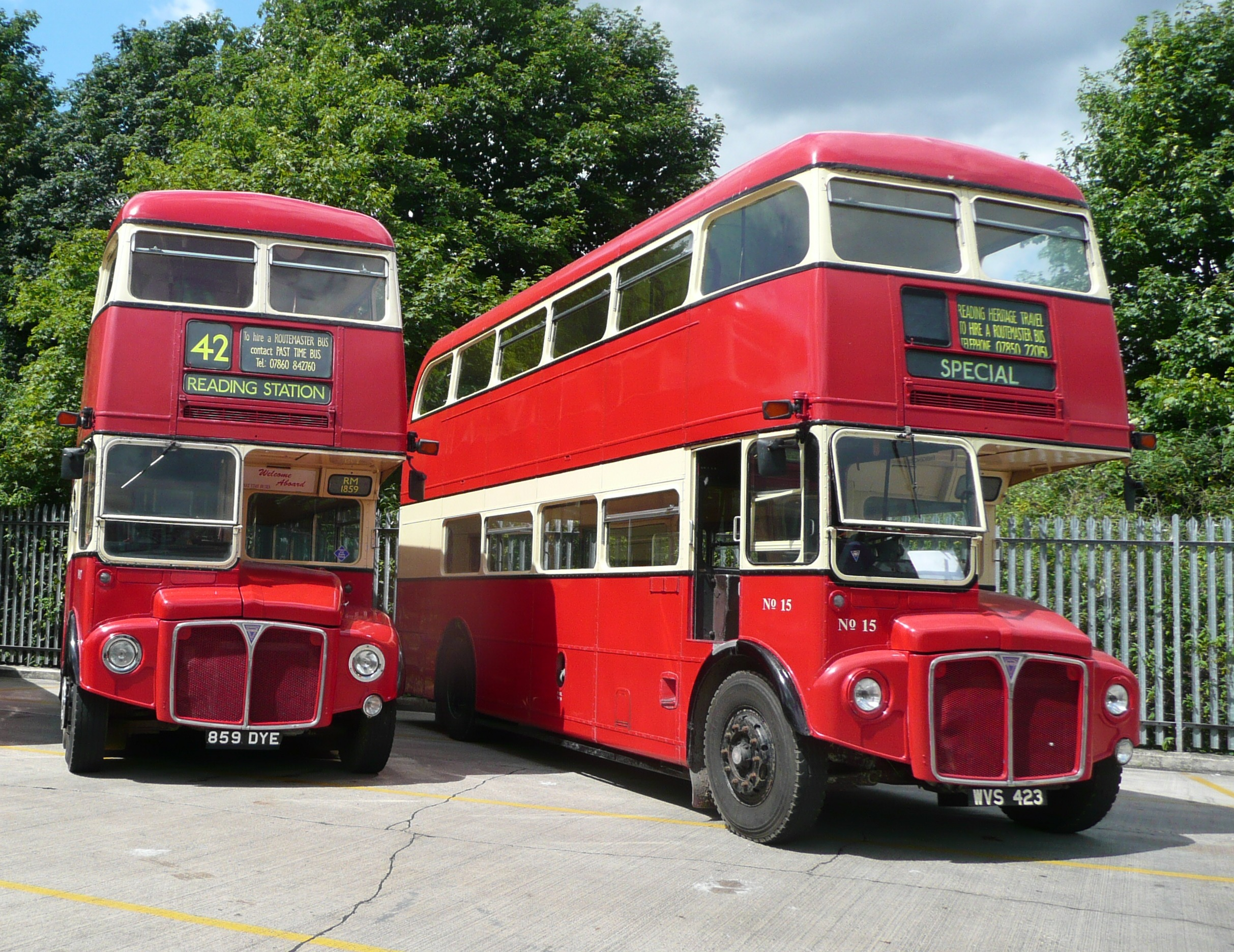
Preserved Reading Mainline RM1859 and RM999 in July 2008

Towards the end of this period, in July 1994 in Reading, new operator Reading Mainline built up a 45-strong Routemaster fleet to compete with the established operator, Reading Buses, in the process becoming the largest operator of Routemasters outside London. They used conductors to compete on speed in the town centre and, in the outskirts, took advantage of the rear platform to operate hail and ride sections of route. In 1998 Reading Mainline was sold to Reading Buses; some Routemasters continued in use until July 2000.

With the costs of running elderly two-crew buses, and with a general reduction in the number of operators, buses, and services in the years following deregulation as competitors merged or closed, use of Routemasters outside London declined through the 1990s. Many of these buses found their way back to London to assist with the refurbishment programme, as spares donors or to increase fleet size.

Withdrawal from mainstream London service saw another resurgence in the use of Routemasters outside London, but on a smaller scale than immediately after deregulation. After 2000 Routemasters were mostly used on small novelty or seasonal routes.

=== Green livery ===
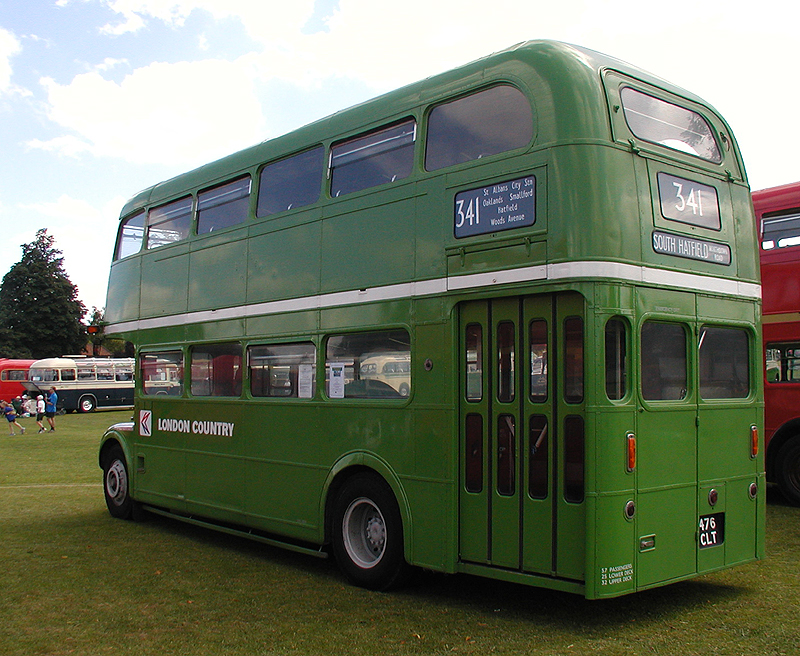
Preserved RMC1476 coach with rear folding doors, in NBC Green livery of London Country Bus Services, lighter than London Transport Country green

The first green Routemasters, apart from prototype CRL4, now RMC4, were 69 RMCs (Routemaster Coach) for Green Line work. These were the same length as the RMs but had luxury seating, luggage racks, strip lights and platform doors. The later 43 RCLs (Routemaster Coach Lengthened) were the same length as the RMLs but again with coach seating and platform doors.

One hundred green Routemasters, based on the RMLs, were delivered in 1965/66 for Country area bus work. Three of these were transferred to the Central (Red) fleet in 1969 in exchange for three XA Leyland Atlanteans.

On 1 January 1970, these green Routemasters were transferred to the newly formed London Country Bus Services, a National Bus Company subsidiary formed to take over London Transport's Country Area. London Country announced that it intended to convert all its services to one-man operation, which it achieved by 1981, making all the Routemasters redundant. Many were sold back to London Transport, the RMCs becoming trainers along with most of the RCLs.

Most of the ex-Country RMLs that were sold back to LT in the late 1970s served longer with red livery than with their original green (Most did 14 years as green buses but over 20 as red buses). Some RCLs had the platform doors removed and entered service as red buses. RMC4 (ex CRL4) was kept by London Country but was later sold when the NBC was sold off.

== Rise and decline ==
=== Peak use by London Transport ===
The peak era of the Routemaster was in its first 25 years of operation, until September 1982, when the type started to be withdrawn and transferred to training fleets due to service reductions.

The first London bus route to be operated by the Routemaster was route 2, on 8 February 1956, with RM1. The same bus, with a revised front end, appeared at the Lord Mayor's Show in November 1956. The RM class entered service from 1959 to replace trolleybuses, which finished in May 1962. Subsequent Routemasters, the last 500 of which were RMLs, began replacing the previous generation of buses, the AEC Regent RT and Leyland Titan RTL and RTW. RMLs also displaced RMs on central routes to cope with higher loadings. The last Routemaster entered service in March 1968.

The original concept included the routine overhaul and refurbishment of the fleet at LT's Aldenham Works, usually every five years. The buses were completely stripped down and rebuilt, and left the works almost as new. As the number of Routemasters declined, financial cutbacks and newer buses not suited to this practice were introduced, the overhaul routine was abandoned and Aldenham Works closed in November 1986. The thoroughness of the Aldenham system was the primary reason why the Routemaster and its predecessors lasted so long in London service.

=== Decline in London ===
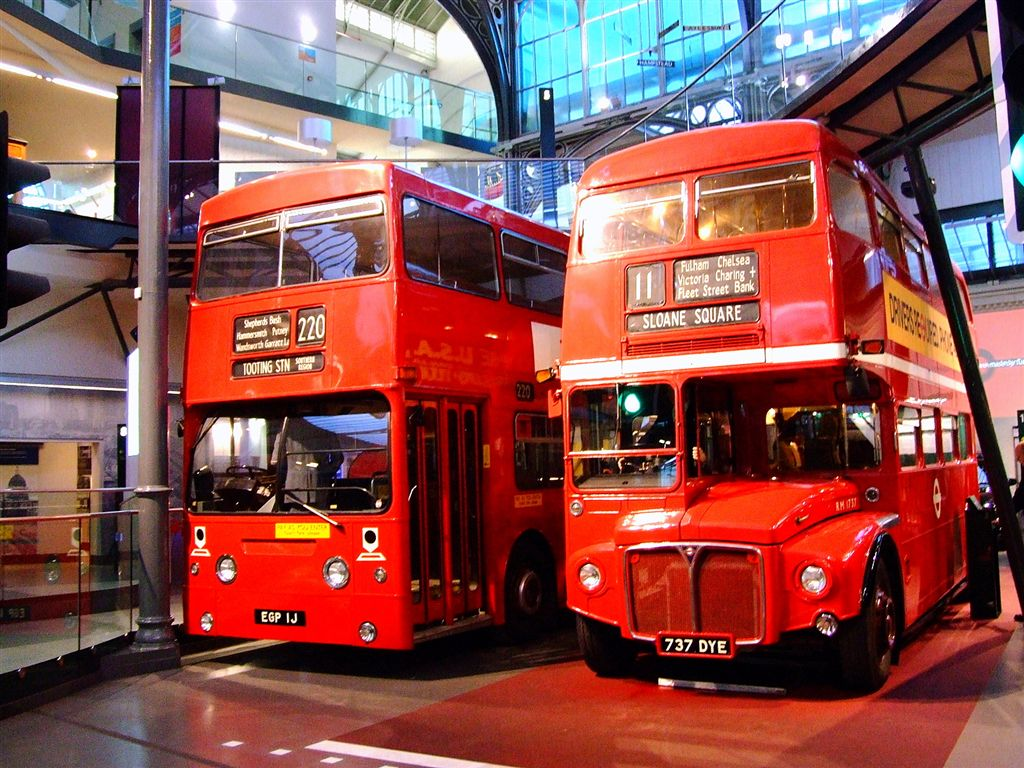
Daimler Fleetline DMS1 and RM1737 at the London Transport Museum in January 2008

Many routes were converted to driver-only operation ("DOO" or "OMO") in the 1970s, to reduce operating costs and in response to staff shortages. There was also for a time a parts shortage for Routemasters, aggravated by the closure of AEC. With the introduction of single-deck Red Arrow services and successful conversion to modern, rear-engined OMO buses around the country, London Transport considered replacing Routemasters with modern buses.

The operation of the Routemaster gradually contracted to central areas only, with RMLs replacing RMs, where it was felt that the Routemaster still provided an efficient means of transporting large enough numbers of people to justify the economics of two-crew operation. The rapid acceleration and rugged construction of the Routemaster proved to be more suited to urban conditions than some more modern designs.

The fleet remained largely intact for around 15 years after production ended in 1968, with withdrawals mainly due to fires. Following the defeat of the Greater London Council in the House of Lords over its subsidised fare scheme, major service reductions followed in September 1982. Consequently, the first withdrawals commenced, with many of these early disposals being for scrap. The continued practice of route conversion to one-person operation resulted in a steady trickle of withdrawals. This practice had largely halted by 1988, with comparatively few withdrawn up to 1992. 12 of the withdrawals were purchased by Southend Transport in 1988 and were run until 1993.

In 1986 some of the Routemasters purchased from British European Airways, London Country and Northern General, which had doors rather than an open platform, were overhauled at Aldenham Works and put in service on London Transport's revived sightseeing operation The Original London Sightseeing Tour, alongside RCLs (some converted to open top buses), RMFs and RMAs.

=== Privatisation of London Buses ===
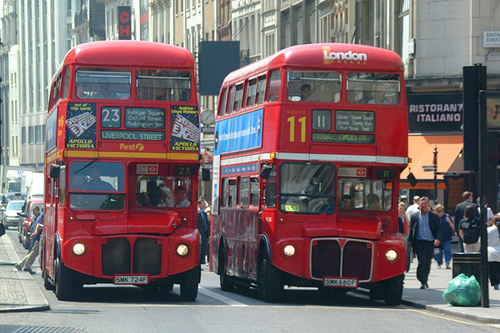
RML2724 and RML2680 wearing First London and London General post-privatisation paint schemes

In April 1989, in preparation for the privatisation of London bus services, London Buses was divided into 11 arm's-length business units based on different garages. Eight units inherited Routemasters: CentreWest, East London, Leaside, London Central, London General, London Northern, London United and South London. During this time, following the failure and premature withdrawal of heralded replacement vehicle classes such as the Daimler Fleetlines, the Routemasters that had not yet been disposed of saw their lives extended for use until privatisation. Where new route tenders called for Routemaster operation, these were leased from London Buses.

Between September and November 1994, all of the business units were sold. In the new London route tendering process, all but one of the Routemaster-operated routes (139) retained their now privately owned Routemasters for the five-year contract period and further refurbishments resulted.

=== Life extensions ===
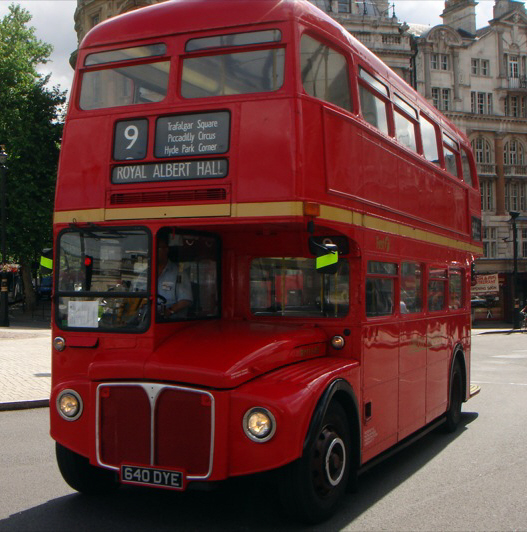
First London Marshall Bus refurbished RM1640 on Heritage route 9 in July 2006

Following the ending of production at AEC Southall, and the later closure of the Aldenham Works, new options for extending the life of the Routemaster became necessary if they were to continue to run. This made sense as, even by 1987, when some buses looked decidedly worn out, inspections by London Buses revealed the basic structure of the buses was still sound, requiring only replacement of engines and interior/exterior renewal.

From 1992 to 1994, all but two of the RMLs were refurbished for ten years' further service. This work, which included updating the interior to modern tastes and substituting Cummins or Iveco engines, was carried out by South Yorkshire Transport, TB Precision, Nottingham Truck & Bus and by one of the new London Buses business units, Leaside Buses. One hundred RMs were also re-engined. Post-privatisation, in 1996, London Central's RMs on route 36, Stagecoach London's RMLs for routes 8 and 15, and Arriva London's RMs for route 159 received new Scania engines and a number of subtle reworks including hopper style windows.

In 2001/02, under new Mayor of London Ken Livingstone, Transport for London (TfL) purchased 50 RMs from a variety of sources, including Reading Mainline and two from Italy. Of these, 43 were refurbished by Marshall Bus between May 2001 and August 2002, receiving Cummins engines coupled to an Allison automatic gearbox. They also received a full body overhaul including new hopper windows. The first 22 were leased to London Sovereign for use on route 13 with ten going to Arriva London for use on route 38 and others to First London, London Central and London United. After Marshall Bus went into administration, Arriva London completed a further six, albeit without the heavy body overhauls and retaining the quarter-drop windows.

=== Withdrawal from London ===
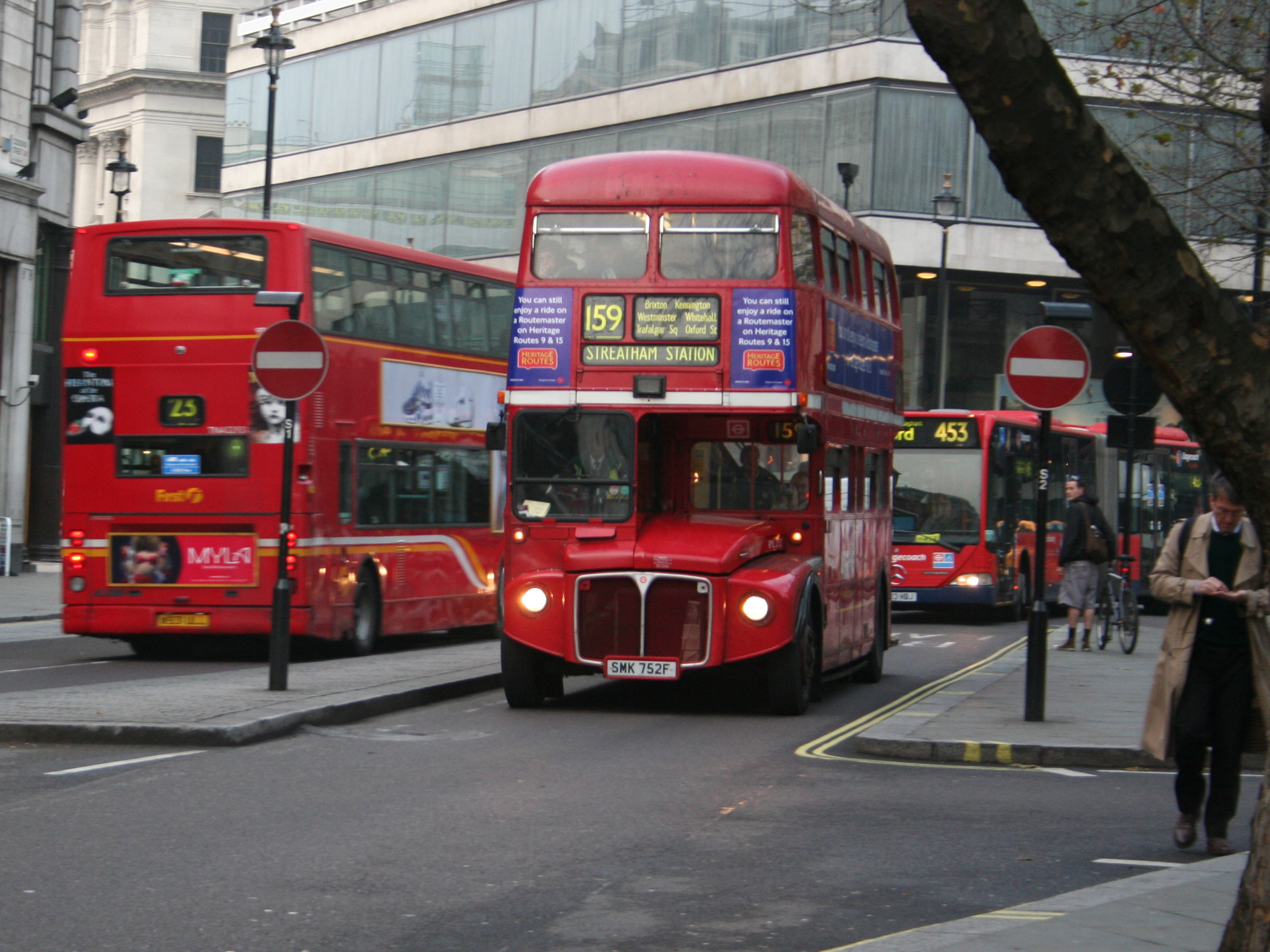
Arriva London's RML2574 on route 159 in December 2005 with its replacements, a modern double-decker and an articulated bus

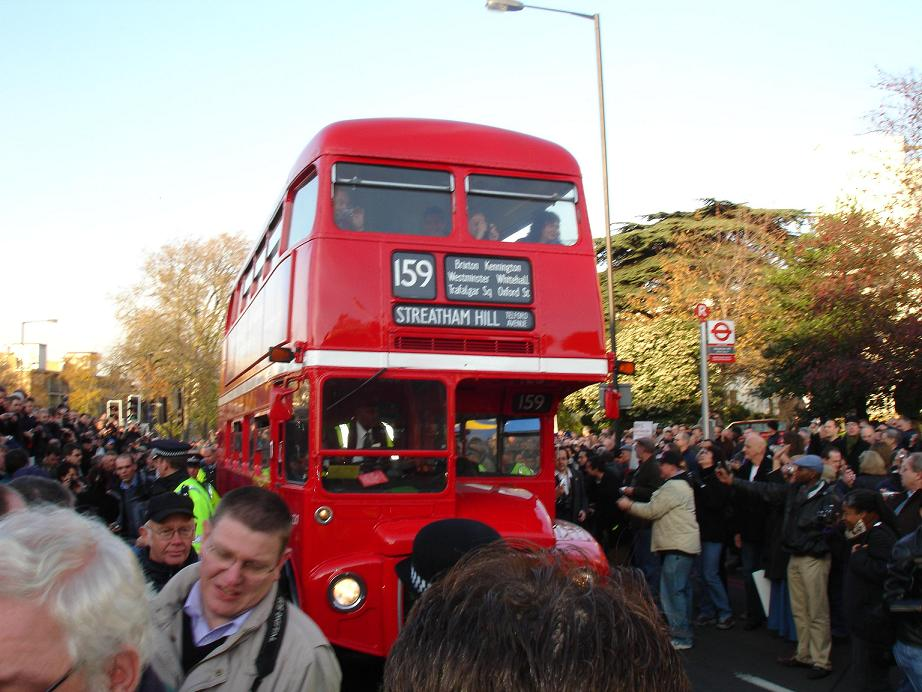
Arriva London's RM2217 arrives at Brixton bus garage with the last scheduled Routemaster service on 9 December 2005.

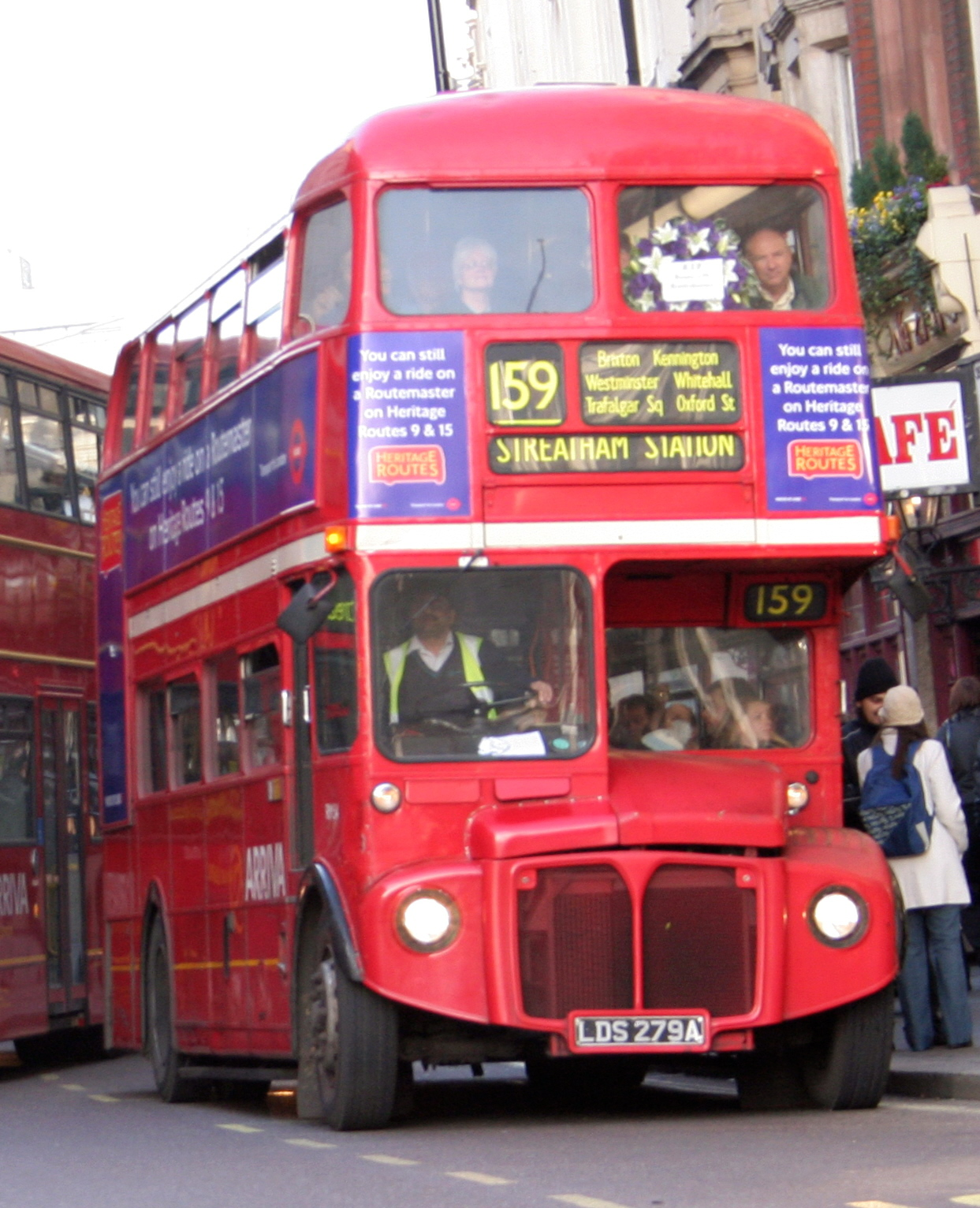
Arriva London's RM54 on Whitehall on 9 December 2005

At the beginning of the 2000s, there was debate concerning the issue of whether to replace or retain the Routemaster in London service. Supporters cited its continued mechanical fitness, speed of boarding and tourist potential, while opponents pointed to the economics of running increasingly elderly buses when newer, larger, accessible buses were now available. Opponents also pointed specifically to the lack of accessibility of the Routemaster in light of impending relevant legislation, which meant all new buses now entering service in London would be required to have a low-floor design. The emergence of off-bus ticketing technology also reduced the argument for better dwell times, whereby the Oyster card and off-bus ticket machines would reduce the time it took passengers to board the bus.

Livingstone was initially supportive of retaining the Routemasters and their conductors, reintroducing 49 refurbished buses into service. However, Livingstone decided to replace the Routemaster fleet with low-floor buses, following a campaign by disabled rights groups, the large number of people injured by falling off the open rear platform and a realisation of the difficulty of trying to use high-floor buses with his children.

In March 2003, Peter Hendy, then managing director of Surface Transport for TfL noted that the implementation of a low-floor, accessible bus fleet was a higher priority than keeping the historic Routemaster buses. Despite criticism from the media and the public, remaining services were consequently replaced from August 2003 onwards by low-floor double-decker or articulated buses, as existing bus contracts were renewed.

Withdrawals began on the dates below as the five-year contracts expired.

Route	Ceased	Operator	Replaced by
15	29 August 2003	East London	double-deckers
11	31 October 2003	London General	double-deckers
23	14 November 2003	First London	double-deckers
94	23 January 2004	Transdev London United	double-deckers
6	26 March 2004	Metroline	double-deckers
98	26 March 2004	Metroline	double-deckers
8	4 June 2004	East London	double-deckers
7	2 July 2004	First London	double-deckers
137	9 July 2004	Arriva London	double-deckers
9	3 September 2004	Transdev London United	double-deckers
73	3 September 2004	Arriva London	articulated buses
390	3 September 2004	Metroline	double-deckers
12	5 November 2004	London Central	articulated buses
36	28 January 2005	London Central	double-deckers
19	1 April 2005	Arriva London	double-deckers
14	22 July 2005	London General	double-deckers
22	22 July 2005	London General	double-deckers
13	21 October 2005	Transdev London Sovereign	double-deckers
38	28 October 2005	Arriva London	articulated buses
159	9 December 2005	Arriva London	double-deckers

On 8 December 2005, 24 special buses, including preserved RMs and RMLs and their predecessors from the AEC Regent III RT bus family made guest appearances on route 159.

On 9 December 2005, the last Routemasters ran on route 159. On police advice, instead of doing a normal shift until around 23:00, the last Routemaster services ran in the middle of the day. RM2217 operated the final departure from Marble Arch at 12:08. Heavily delayed, it took 10 minutes to turn the final corner into Brixton bus garage, arriving at 14:06. The last services were greeted by crowds of bus enthusiasts, as well as disability rights protesters welcoming the withdrawal.

As a consequence of the withdrawal, all London bus routes used low-floor buses by January 2006, thanks to the largest accessible bus fleet in the world.

== After 2005 ==
=== London heritage routes ===
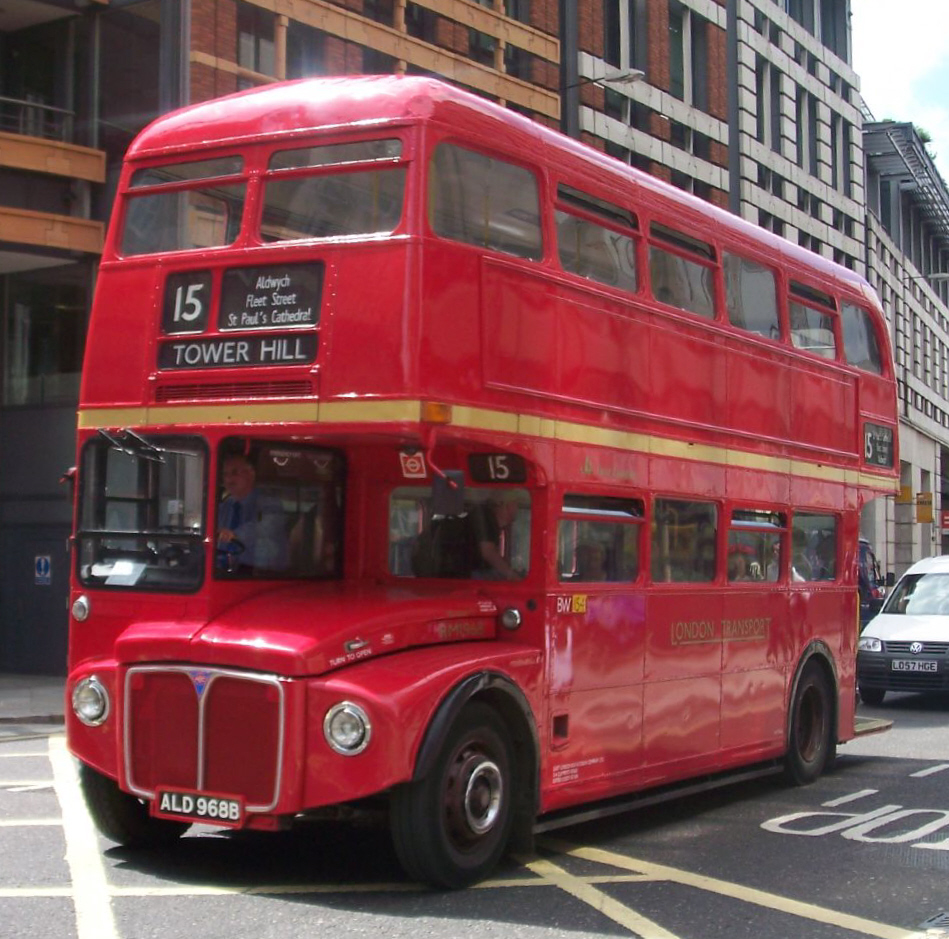
East London Routemaster on Heritage route 15 on Ludgate Hill in June 2008

In November 2005 heritage routes 9 and 15 were introduced, operating daily until 18:30, duplicating short sections of two regular London bus routes. Heritage Routes 9 and 15 were withdrawn on 25 July 2014 and 29 September 2019.

The two operators, First London and Stagecoach London, each operated ten buses selected from the batch overhauled by Marshall Bus in 2001/02.

During the operation of Heritage Route 15, Stagecoach East London refurbished their Routemasters, removing some of the modern features that had been added during the Marshall refurbishments and replacing them with replicas of the original equipment. This was done by Hants & Dorset Trim, and involved a full overhaul and repaint inside and out, the return of gold lettering, black registration plates and fitting of modern LED indicators on the front and LED indicators and lights on the rear. (The LED assemblies were designed to appear similar to the round lights that were originally fitted.) The yellow hand rails were replaced with white-coated steel ones, also a nod to the original design. The first refurbished vehicle was delivered back to Stagecoach East London in January 2016.

TfL confirmed the cancellation of the heritage routes in 2021, thus ending scheduled service with the Routemaster temporarily anywhere in London. The last five Routemasters owned by TfL, latterly operated by Stagecoach London from West Ham bus garage, were placed up for auction in February 2026.

In 2022, TfL approved the opening of a privately operated tourist heritage route, by operator Londoner Buses. From 15 October 2022, Route A commenced from Waterloo station to Piccadilly Circus. The route goes past iconic attractions like Big Ben and Westminster Bridge, and is solely operated by AEC Routemaster buses. Unlike previous heritage routes, a higher price is charged than the standard TfL bus fare, however the ticket is valid all day. In October 2023 route A was replaced by route T15, which mostly parallels TfL's previous Heritage route 15 and runs from Waterloo station via Charing Cross, Aldwych, and the city, to Tower Gateway DLR station.

=== Running days ===
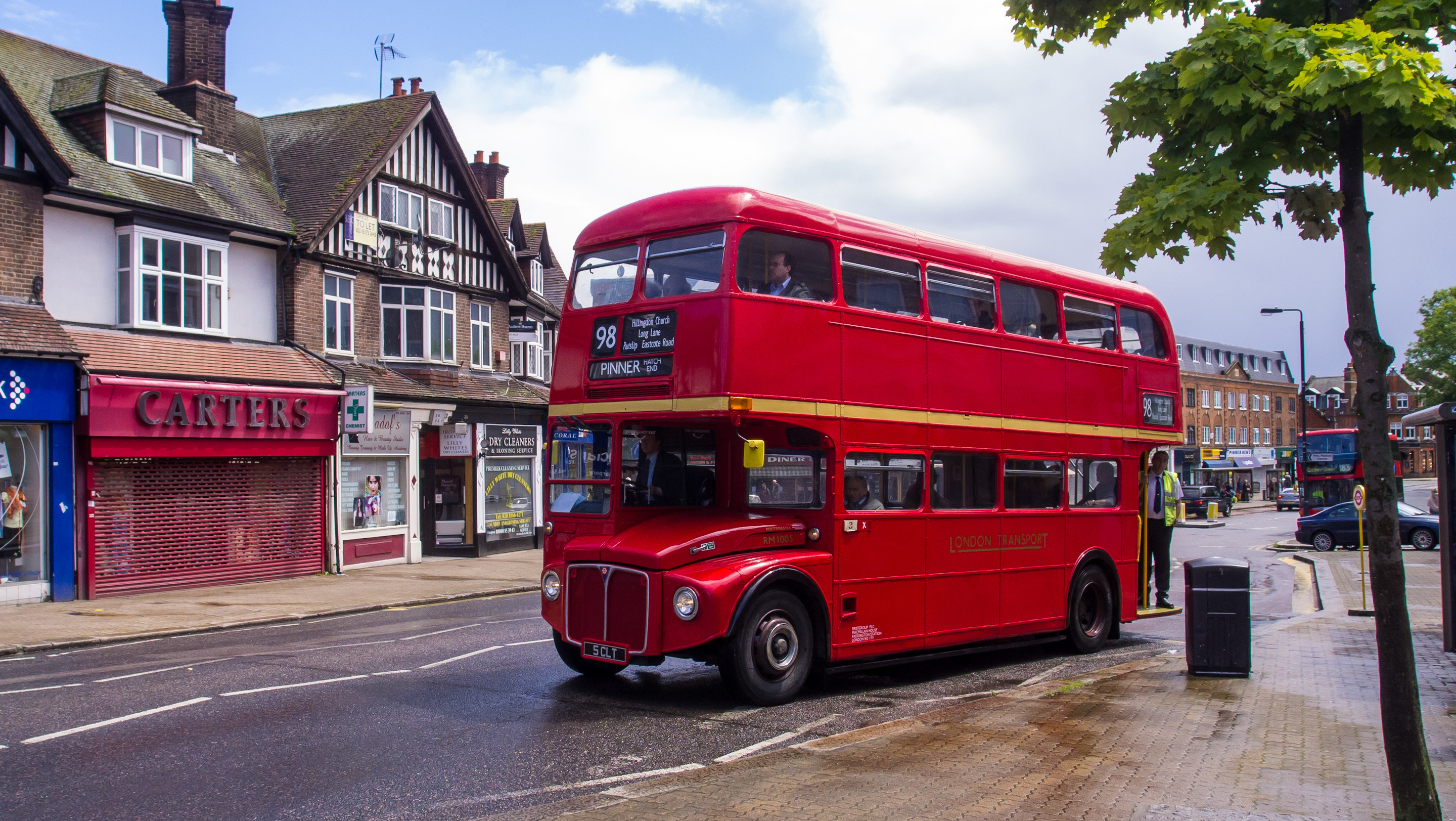
Routemaster RM1005 in Pinner in 2012, during a running day

The London Bus Museum as well as other transport societies sometimes hold events once or twice a year with a Routemaster (or other bus vehicles) running a certain route and open to the public.

=== Tour and charter use ===
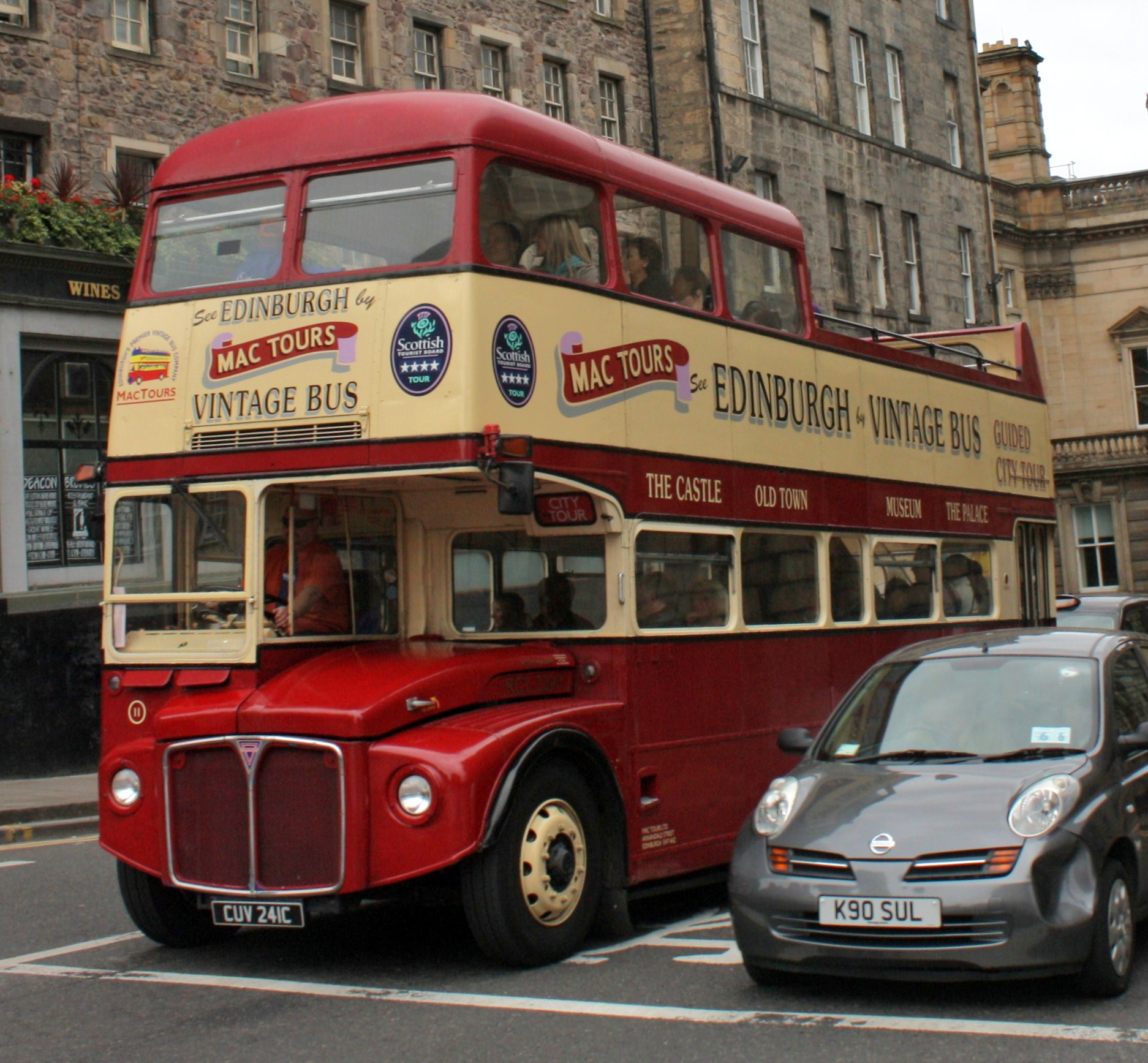
Open top RCL2241 on a Mac's Tours service in Edinburgh in August 2010

Aside from the London heritage route, the last major operation of Routemasters was in Edinburgh, where Lothian Buses' tour operation, Mac Tours used open-top Routemasters on regular tours. The last were withdrawn in October 2016.

The Afternoon Tea Bus Tour operates as a tourist service in London. Many Routemasters remain in service as charter buses, both with the companies that operated them in London and with niche charter operators.

Routemasters have also been exported, with some seeing further service in Australia, Canada (Victoria, British Columbia, Niagara Falls, Ontario and Toronto), China, Colombia, Croatia, the Falkland Islands, Malaysia, New Zealand, Sri Lanka and the United States. A number of Stagecoach Routemasters have been exported to Montreal in Canada, where Stagecoach provides a tourist service around the city.

== Uses in popular culture ==
The red double-decker bus is an emblem of London. The BBC states, "ubiquitous black cabs and red double-decker buses all have long and tangled stories that are deeply embedded in London’s traditions". It featured at the 2008 Summer Olympics closing ceremony in Beijing, where David Beckham, Jimmy Page and Leona Lewis represented Britain during the handover segment for the 2012 Olympics (to take place in London) with the three riding a Routemaster into the stadium and Page and Lewis performing "Whole Lotta Love".

In December 2014, the PepsiCo brand 7 Up worked with the inventor of yarn bombing, Magda Sayeg, to completely knit an original Routemaster bus. The "Number 7up" as it was called, took to London's streets for 2 days in December 2014.

In June 2015, Music Heritage London introduced a scheduled bus service using Routemaster RMLs on a loop between Richmond, Twickenham and Teddington to highlight the immense impact the area made to one of the most defining decades in 20th Century Britain and the counterculture that spawned Swinging 60s London. The Swinging 60s Shuttle Bus route and bus number was the 60s with 18 allocated bus stops along its one-hour route. This shuttle service ran until the end of the Rugby World Cup in October 2015 and has now been replaced by the Swinging 60s Tour Bus which still uses Routemaster RMLs on its many tours around London music venues and locations.

The Prodigy used the bus for the cover of their 2018 album No Tourists. The opening of Episode 1 of Series 7 of Hustle employed an open-top AEC Routemaster on Westminster Bridge in which the Hustle crew showed Japanese investors available properties for purchase, and closing a sale implicitly including Big Ben and/or the Houses of Parliament.

== New Routemaster ==
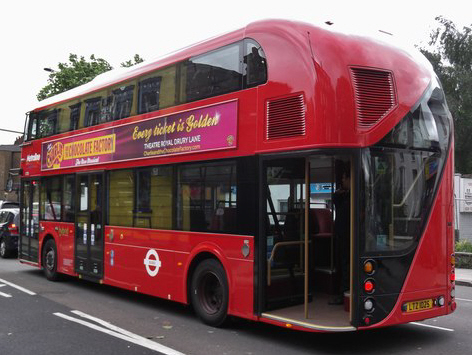
Metroline New Routemaster on route 24 in Camden Town in June 2013

Such was the popularity of the Routemaster that many calls continued to be made for a new version of the vehicle to be produced. On 3 September 2007, Conservative mayoral candidate Boris Johnson announced that he was contemplating introducing a modern-day version of the Routemaster (and scrapping articulated bus operation). In December 2007, UK magazine Autocar commissioned leading bus designer Capoco, designer of the innovative Optare Solo, to come up with detailed proposals for a new-generation Routemaster.

Johnson backed the Capoco design in principle and suggested that he would hold a formal design competition to develop a new Routemaster if he became London mayor in 2008. After he was elected, this competition was held for general ideas and detailed designs, with cash prizes for the winning entries. The results of the competition were published on 19 December 2008, with the winning and other good proposals being passed to bus manufacturers to draw up a final design. The winners included two joint "whole bus" designs, one submitted by Capoco and one submitted by Aston Martin and Foster + Partners.

Initially named the New Bus for London and later the New Routemaster, eight prototypes entered service on route 38 in February 2012, with route 24 being the first route fully converted in June 2013. By 2017, the fleet numbered 1,000.

== Skopje City Master ==
In 2010, the government of the Republic of Macedonia ordered 202 double-decker buses from the Chinese manufacturer Yutong, two of which were cabriolet buses with removable roofs to be used by tourists, and the remaining 200 as city buses for the capital city of Skopje. The buses were to be in a "retro" style, similar to Routemasters. Former London double-deckers were used in Skopje until the 1963 Skopje earthquake in which 75%–80% of the city's infrastructure was destroyed.

The prototype bus appeared on the streets of Skopje on 1 March 2011. The first cabriolet buses (with removable roofs) and 65 city buses entered service on 6 September 2011, all under the name City Master. The rest of the buses, as well as another 15 cabriolet buses ordered in late 2011, were due to arrive by the end of 2013.

== Preservation ==
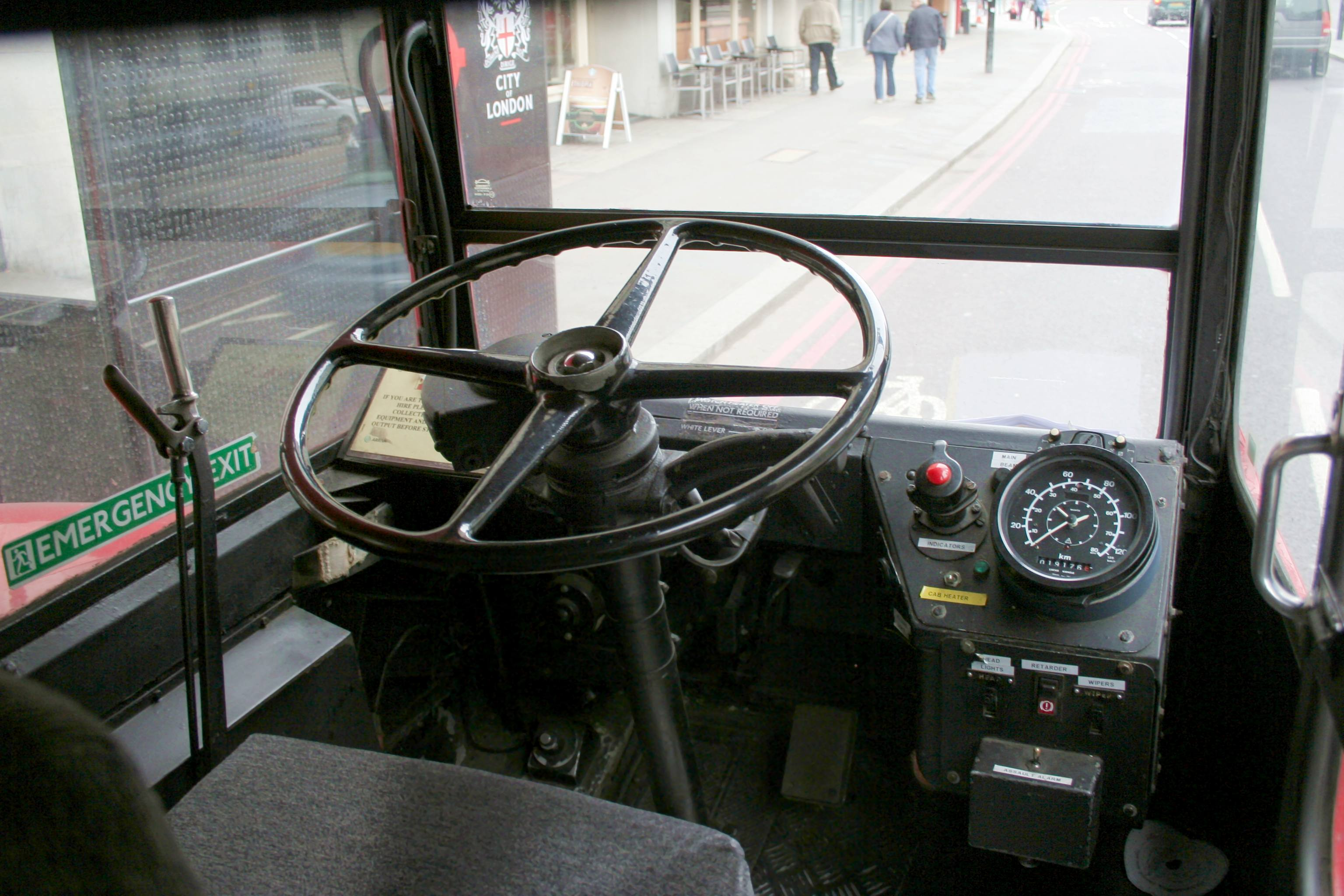
Driver's cab of RM2217 with some controls labelled

Owing to its design and status, a relatively large number of Routemasters have ended up in the hands of private owners and companies after being withdrawn from use in London.

=== Ensign ===
Bus dealer Ensignbus handled disposals of the Routemasters, as it had long done for other London buses. In December 2004, Ensignbus held a raffle for 32 Routemasters, available for £2,000 each to those who could prove they had the finances to store and care for them.

=== Anniversaries ===
On 25 July 2004, 98 Routemasters were lined up in Finsbury Park in celebration of the 50th anniversary of the first appearance of RM1. A repeat event occurred in July 2014 for the 60th anniversary, with 136 Routemasters attending. Routemaster 70 was held at Finsbury Park in July 2024 to commemorate the 70th anniversary.

=== Notable examples ===
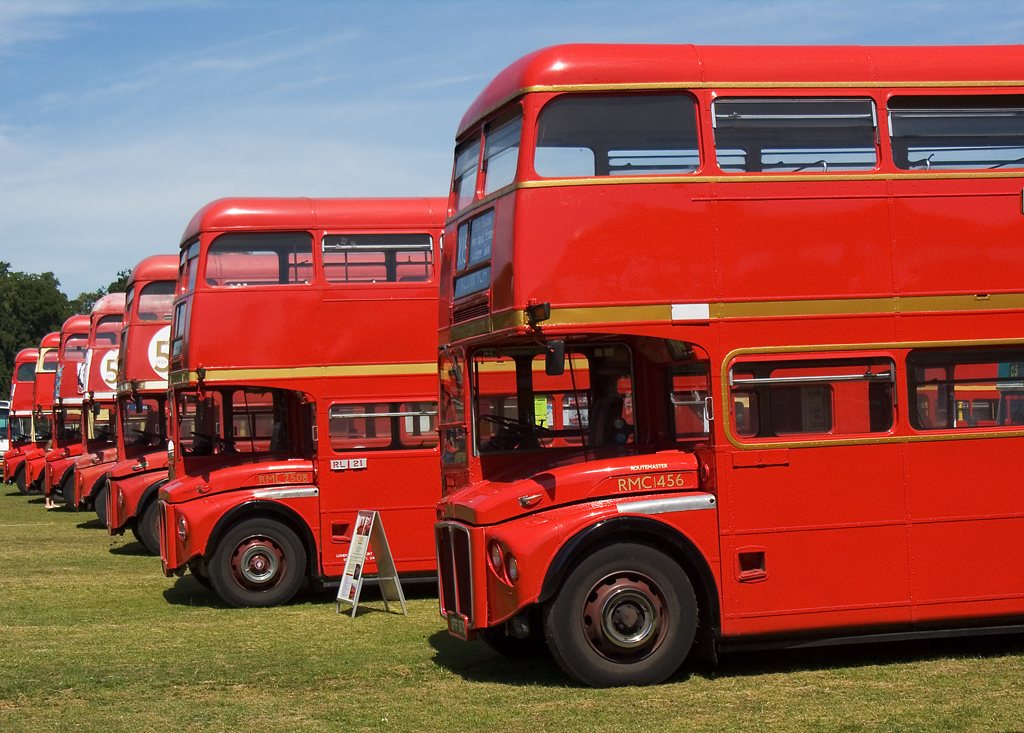
Routemasters at Alton bus rally in June 2006

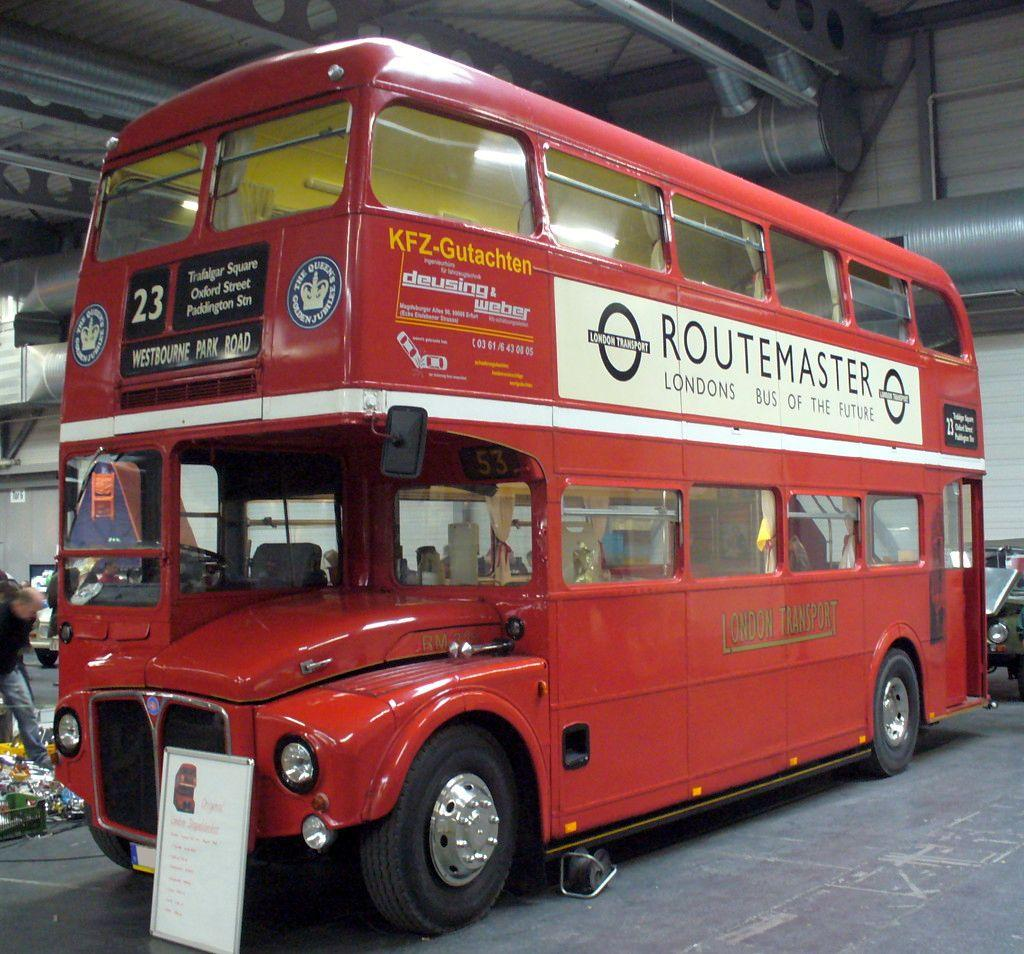
RM339 on display in Erfurt, Germany in January 2008

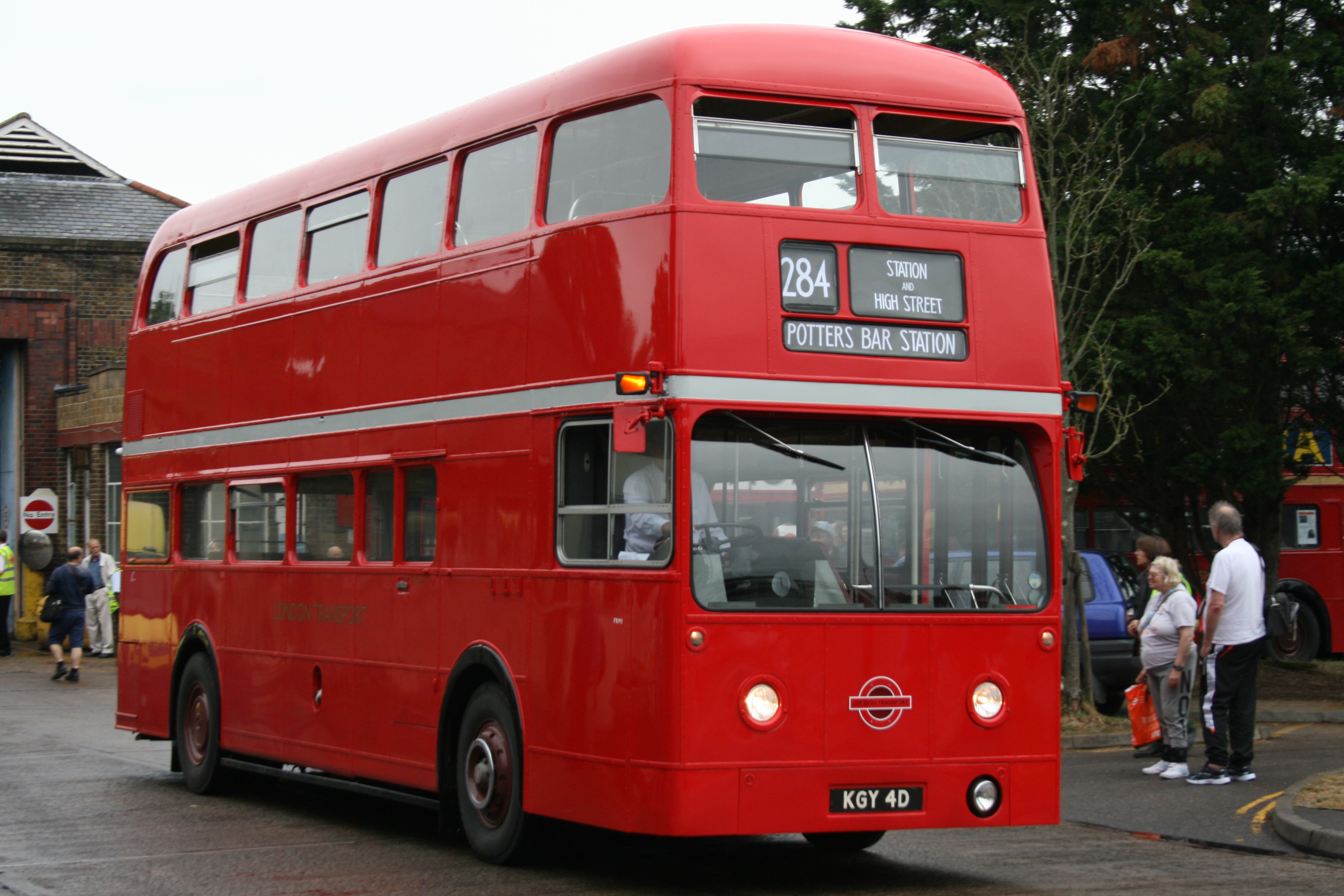
The solitary rear-engined Routemaster, now in preservation

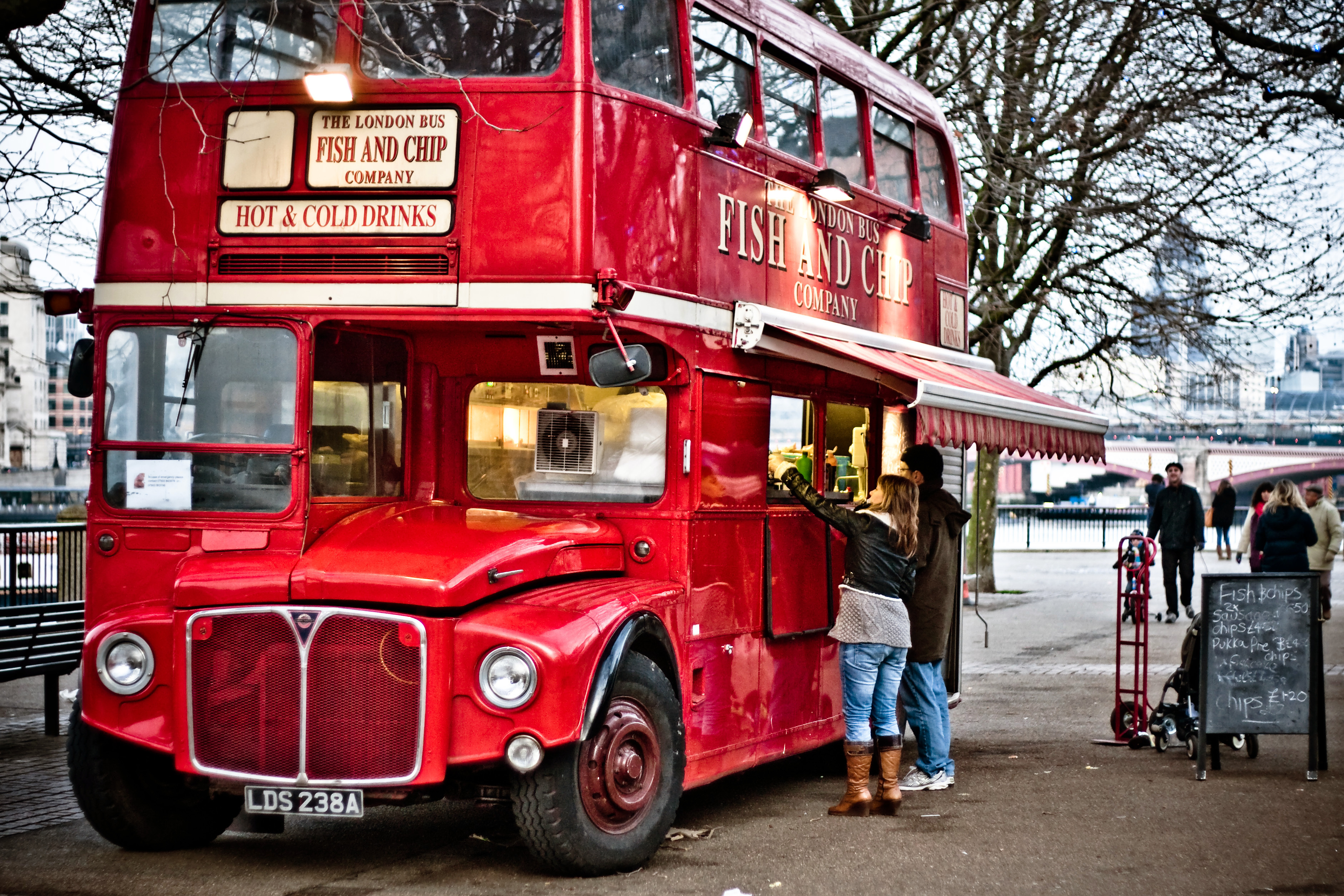
Routemaster converted into a mobile "chip van". This is operated by The London Bus Fish And Chip Company.

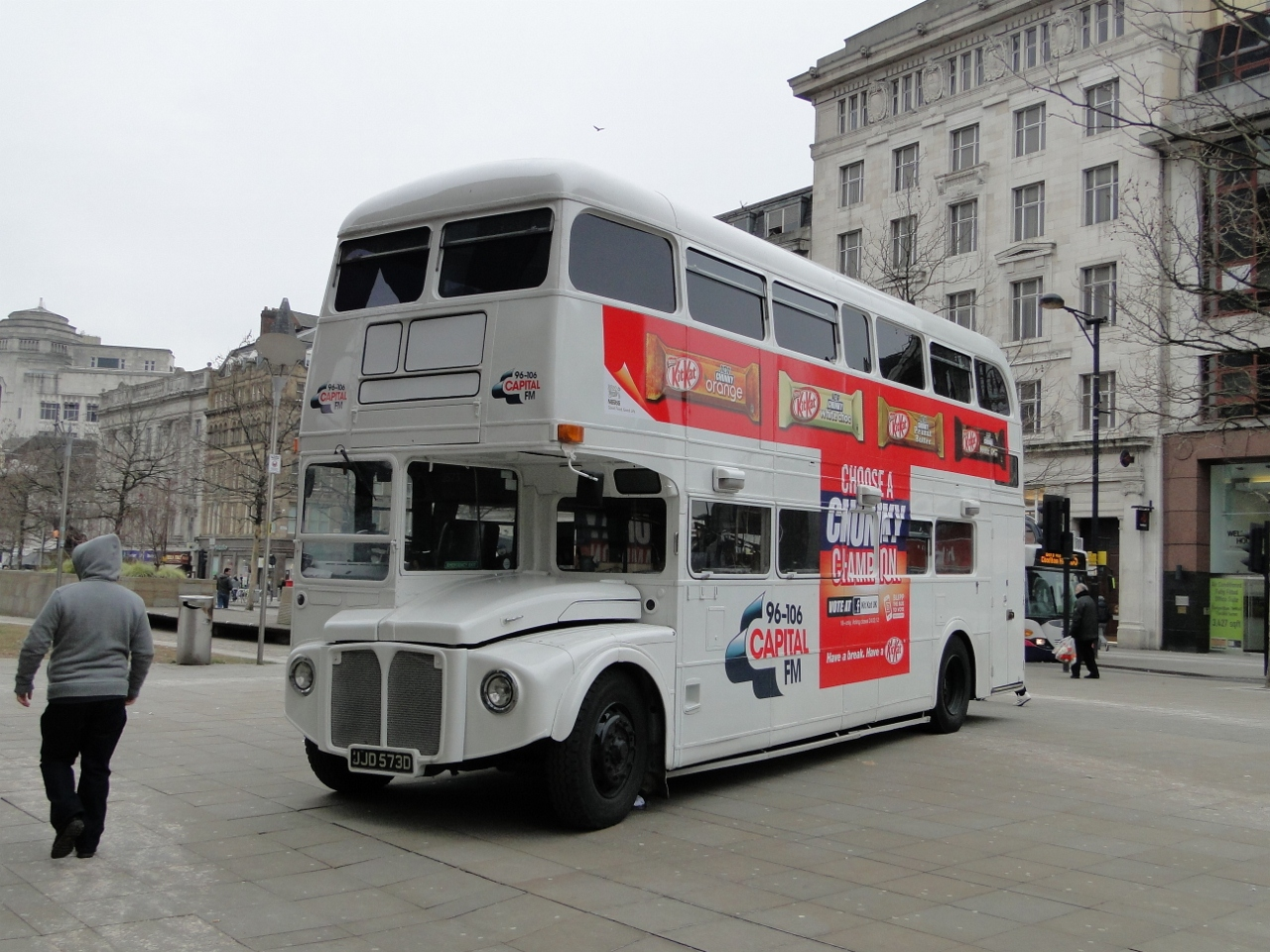
Routemaster (painted white and advertising four varieties of Kit Kat chocolate bar) converted into a mobile radio station by Capital London

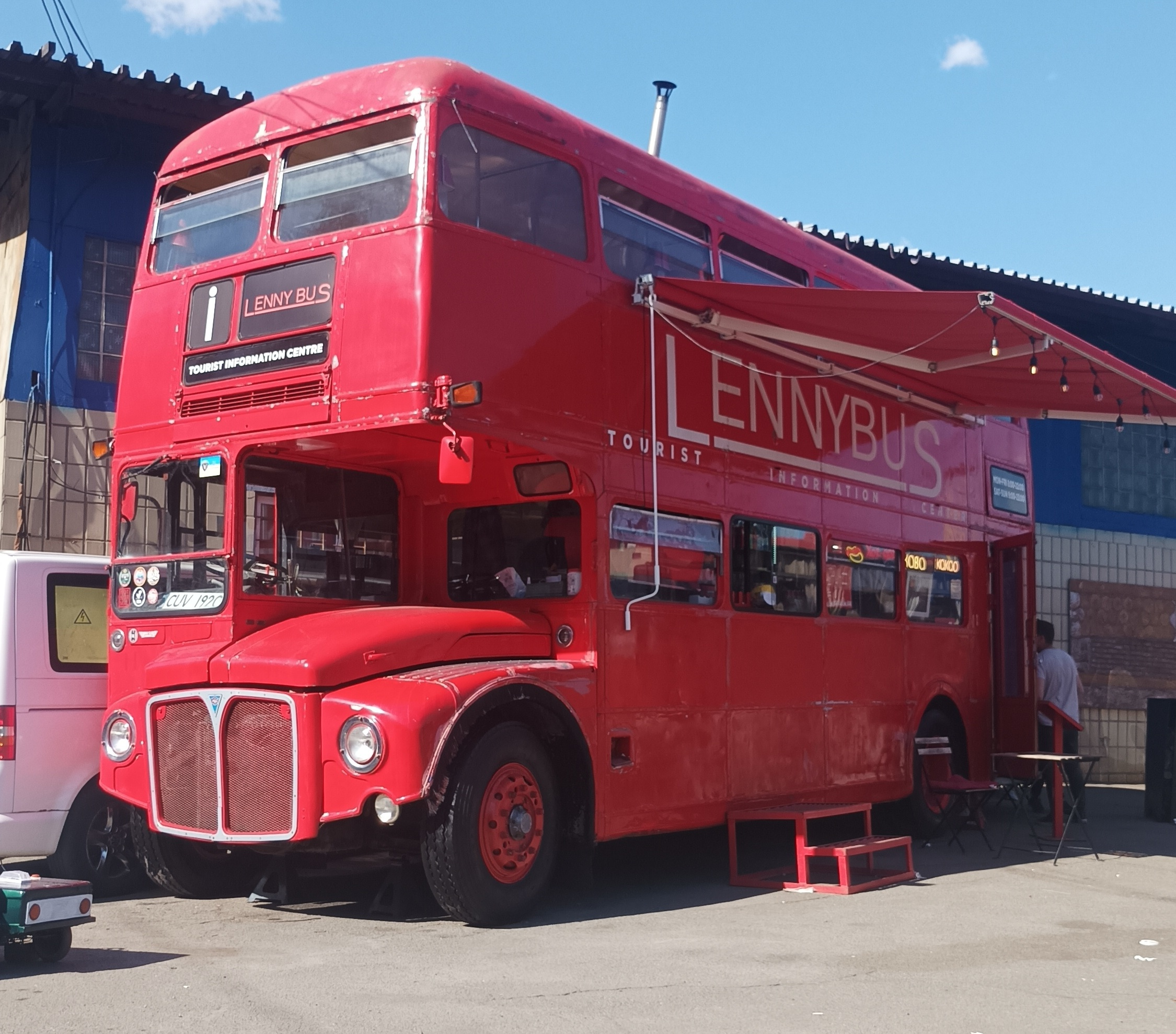
RM2192, converted into a mobile cafe and named "Lennybus", at the Old Car Land festival in Kyiv, Ukraine

- In February and August 1986 RM1 and RM2 were placed in the custody of the London Transport Museum
- In February 1974 RML3 was sold to Cobham Bus Museum (now the London Bus Museum) (L in this case stood for Leyland). This vehicle has had a replica of its original front fitted.
- Prototype coach RMC4 (originally CRL4) is preserved by Roger Wright of the London Bus Company and is being fitted with a replica of its original front.
- On 28 April 2010, Roger Wright repatriated RM1371 and RM1620, along with seven RTs and two RTLs from Charlottetown, Prince Edward Island, Canada. London Bus Company purchased the fleet from Charlottetown-based Abegweit Tours and Travel Agency Inc., which had operated them since 1965. The buses were driven to Halifax, Nova Scotia for shipment to the UK. Some are destined for tourist operation in London while the remainder will be preserved in museums.
- The first production Routemaster, RM8, is preserved by the RM8 Club. It was displayed at the 1958 Commercial Vehicle Show as the new bus for London. It was employed at Chiswick Works as an experimental vehicle upon which many Routemaster modifications were tested. The bus finally entered public service at Sidcup garage in March 1976, being the last Routemaster to enter service and the last open-platform bus to be introduced into service in the UK. It served LT at Sidcup garage until the garage went "one-person" in 1985. It was then preserved by the RM8 Group, which subsequently became the RM8 Club. In July 2008, the bus was restored to its 1958 Commercial Vehicle Show appearance, complete with replica posters and blinds.
- The 1,000th Routemaster, RM1000, was handed over to London Transport with a ceremony at Southall Works on 16 October 1961, and adopted as a showbus by staff at Croydon garage; it passed to the RM1000 Preservation Group for preservation in May 1987.
- The unique rear-engined front entrance Routemaster, FRM1, was donated to the London Transport Museum for preservation in 1983.
- RM1737 was the show bus of Ash Grove bus garage in the early 1980s. It passed into TfL ownership and is displayed at the London Transport Museum.
- RM737 was the show bus at Harrow Weald garage and, despite being in daily service on route 140, was regularly seen at preservation rallies. Purchased by the show bus team when route 140 was converted, it was the first standard example in preservation. It is now operated for private hires by The Red Bus Ltd. in Edinburgh.
- RM1403 was the first Routemaster to be converted to an open-top. It was converted in 1984 at Aldenham using a special, curved roof design only seen on two Routemasters. RM1403 is the only open-top Leyland Routemaster in the world and is currently owned by A Route 2 Hire. The bus has made several notable public appearances including the transport of the Watford football team and Brawn GP F1 team.
- RM2217, which operated the last regular Routemaster service in London in December 2005, has been retained by Arriva London in its Heritage Fleet, along with RM5 and RM6, and the first production RMC coach RMC1453, among others. The bus also appears as the front cover picture (with the author as the driver) of Ian Nairn's 1966 book Nairn's London.
- RML2408 was sent to Macau in 2021 and is permanently placed at The Londoner Macao.
- RML2537 is preserved in open-top form at Long Beach, California and operated in connection with the Queen Mary, which is permanently berthed there as a floating hotel.
- The last Routemaster built for London, RML2760, is retained by Stagecoach London.
- The first RCL, RCL2218, is preserved at the Nottingham Transport Heritage Centre.
- Several RMAs are operated by Joe Letts and the Big Red Bus Company.
- RML 2520 is owned by the CERN's IdeaSquare, and is housed in their working space in Switzerland. It is used as a two-floor meeting room and is in fully operational condition, having made the drive from London to Geneva.
- In 2000, Routemaster RM2192, CUV192C "Lennybus", was converted into an information centre and cafe in Kyiv, Ukraine. Since 2024, this has been touring the city, visiting different shopping centres and events throughout the city of Kyiv.

=== Hong Kong ===
RM1288 (Hong Kong #1) and RM1873 (Hong Kong #2) were sent to Citybus to attend the "British Exhibition" held at the New World Center in Tsim Sha Tsui in 1984. In 1985, the rear stairs and the boarding platform were swapped left and right to make them suitable for left-hand drive traffic in mainland China. After the completion of the project, RM1288 and RM1873 were shipped to Guangzhou and Beijing respectively for promotion purposes, hoping to find further uses for the Routemaster, which was being retired from London at the time. RM1288 was withdrawn in 2015, sold to Great European Carnival (HKGEC) and then converted into a static exhibit at Kam Tin campsite in Forest Valleyland.

RM1873 was converted into an antique tour bus in autumn 1990, with most of the roof retained. It was licensed in Hong Kong with license plate ES4007 and team number 2 but the market reaction was not as expected. Two years later, Citybus arranged to convert it into an open-top bus. RM1873 was withdrawn in 2010s after a fire had burnt the bus.

In 1991, Citybus purchased RM1703 as bus #3 and retained most of the original Park Royal bodywork when it was released. It was converted into an open-top bus in 1992 and advertised the Peak Tram. After many years of service, the #3 was decommissioned and dismantled in 1999.

RM870 was purchased in 1991-92 but was scrapped in 1993 as it failed to pass the Transport Department's vehicle inspection.

== See also ==
- FRM and XRM
- List of bus types used in London
