= Northern General Transport Company =

Defunct Bus company in North East England

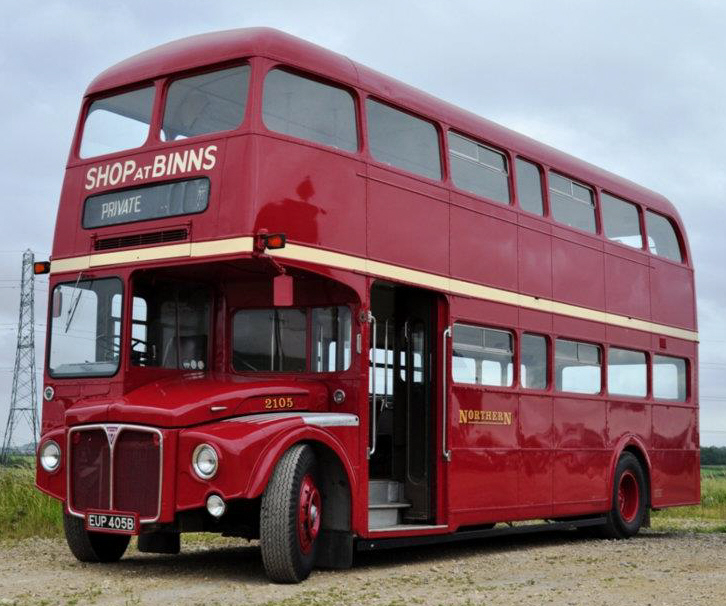
- Preserved AEC Routemaster in December 2011
- Parent: National Bus Company
- Founded: 1913
- Ceased operation: February 1987
- Headquarters: Gateshead
- Service area: County Durham; Northumberland; Tyne & Wear
- Service type: Bus operator
- Fleet: 730 (February 1987)

The Northern General Transport Company was a bus company in North East England from 1913 to 1987.

== History ==
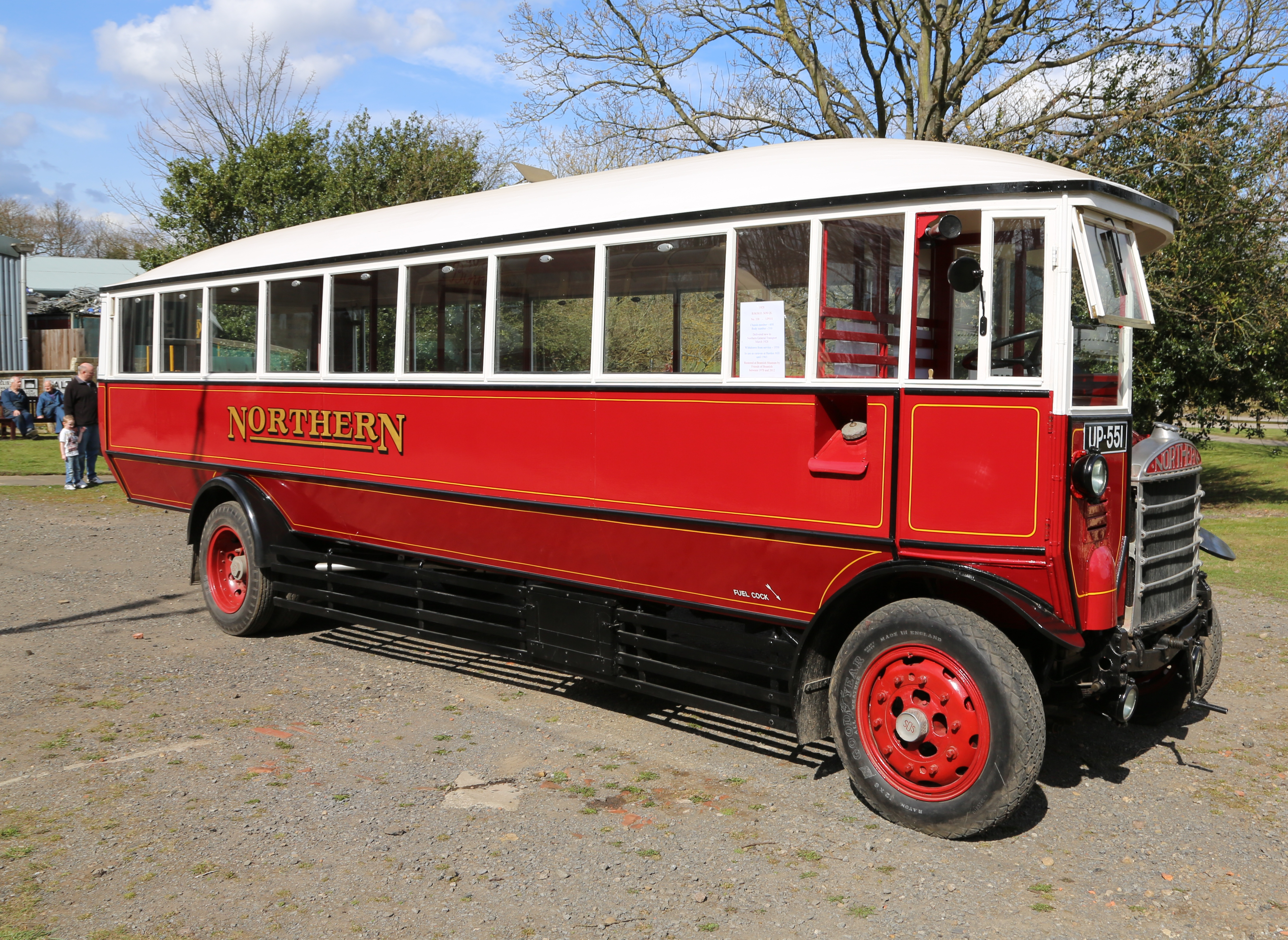
Preserved Northern General Transport Company BMMO-built SOS QL single-decker built in 1928

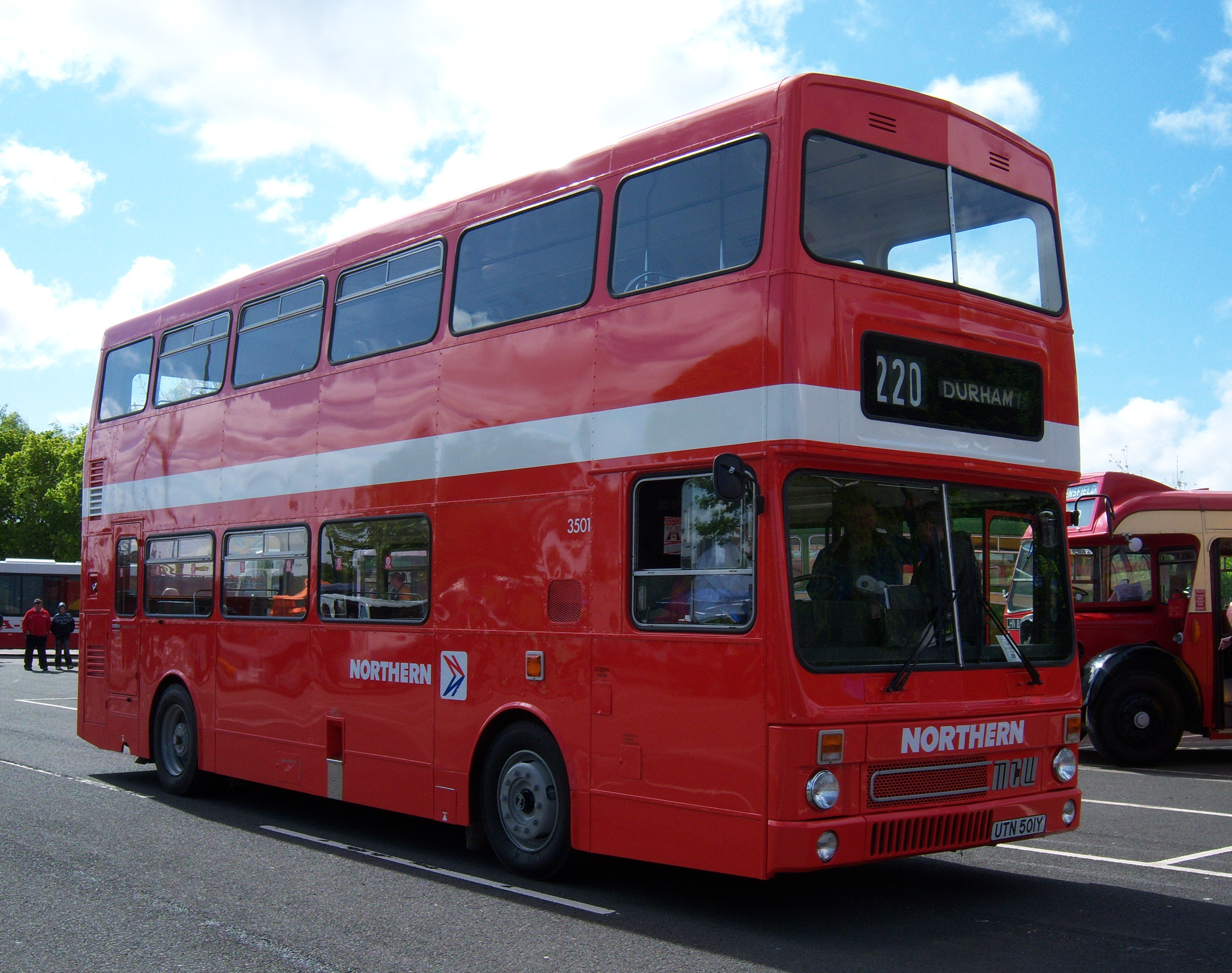
Preserved MCW Metrobus in May 2009

=== Early history ===
Northern General originated in the early 1900s when Gateshead and District Tramways asked Parliament's permission to extend their Tramway, which finished at Low Fell, to Chester-le-Street. Parliament denied this, so the directors decided to set up a motor bus operation instead. Hence the Northern General Transport Company was formed and its first depot was built at Picktree Lane, Chester-le-Street in 1913. Gateshead Tramways was a subsidiary of British Electric Traction.

The first motor bus service was from Chester-le-Street, via Birtley, to Low Fell, where there was a connection to the Gateshead trams. The service was quickly extended to Gateshead and within a few years crossed the River Tyne to finish in Newcastle.

Other motor bus routes quickly developed from Chester-le-Street, its central location being ideal for other towns and colliery villages nearby. Northern even built the bus station in Durham (as a terminus) before Tilling's United Automobile Services arrived there. After World War I, services really got going. In Newcastle two bus stations were opened, Marlborough Crescent and Worswick Street. Depots were built in Stanley and Gateshead which was to become the workshops and in 1933 the head office.

Throughout the 1930s smaller independents were bought out and British Electric Traction in the North East began to convert to motor bus operation, expanding into Sunderland and North Tyneside taking over the declining tramway routes and expanding the bus routes further. By now Northern even built their own buses to accommodate the high passenger numbers with the very low bridges in the area (meaning three-axle single deckers). There were by now excursion services, parcel deliveries and long-distance services to other cities including London Victoria Coach Station.

=== Post-war ===
After 1945, Northern and United started more co-operation on routes and further expansion in the Chester-le-Street and Stanley areas. As for vehicles, Guy, Leyland and Crossley were quite common. In the 1950s Northern bought up more smaller bus operators and with expanding industry at the time rebodied quite a few of their prewar buses. However, by the late 1950s these were showing their age, so in 1959 Northern General placed one of the first big orders for the new Leyland Atlantean.

By now the friendly rivalry between Northern and United was at its peak, and United being a Tilling Group company had Bristol Lodekkas and the underpowered Atlanteans put Northern at a disadvantage. After assessing and testing a demonstrator AEC Routemaster, Northern placed an initial order for 18, followed by another 32, and later prototype RMF1254 was purchased. They were fitted with Leyland engines and a higher-ratio rear axle for operation on longer trunk routes. However, throughout the 1970s it became increasingly uneconomic to have conductors on inter-urban services. Despite driver and customer satisfaction, Northern had little option but to replace them. Northern placed a large order for Bristol VRs with Eastern Coach Works and Willowbrook bodywork in 1977 to replace them.

=== Nationalisation ===
On 1 January 1969, Northern became part of the National Bus Company. On 1 May 1970, neighbouring Venture Transport was purchased with 86 buses.

=== Privatisation ===
In February 1987, as part of the privatisation of the National Bus Company and by now trading as Go-Ahead Northern, Northern General Transport was sold in a management buyout, becoming the first company of what is now the Go-Ahead Group. The Northern General Transport Company Ltd was renamed Go Northern Limited in June 1998, and is still owned by the Go-Ahead Group although the company has been dormant since approximately 2009. See the Go-Ahead Group article for more information on the operating history since privatisation in 1987.
