= Bus transport in London =

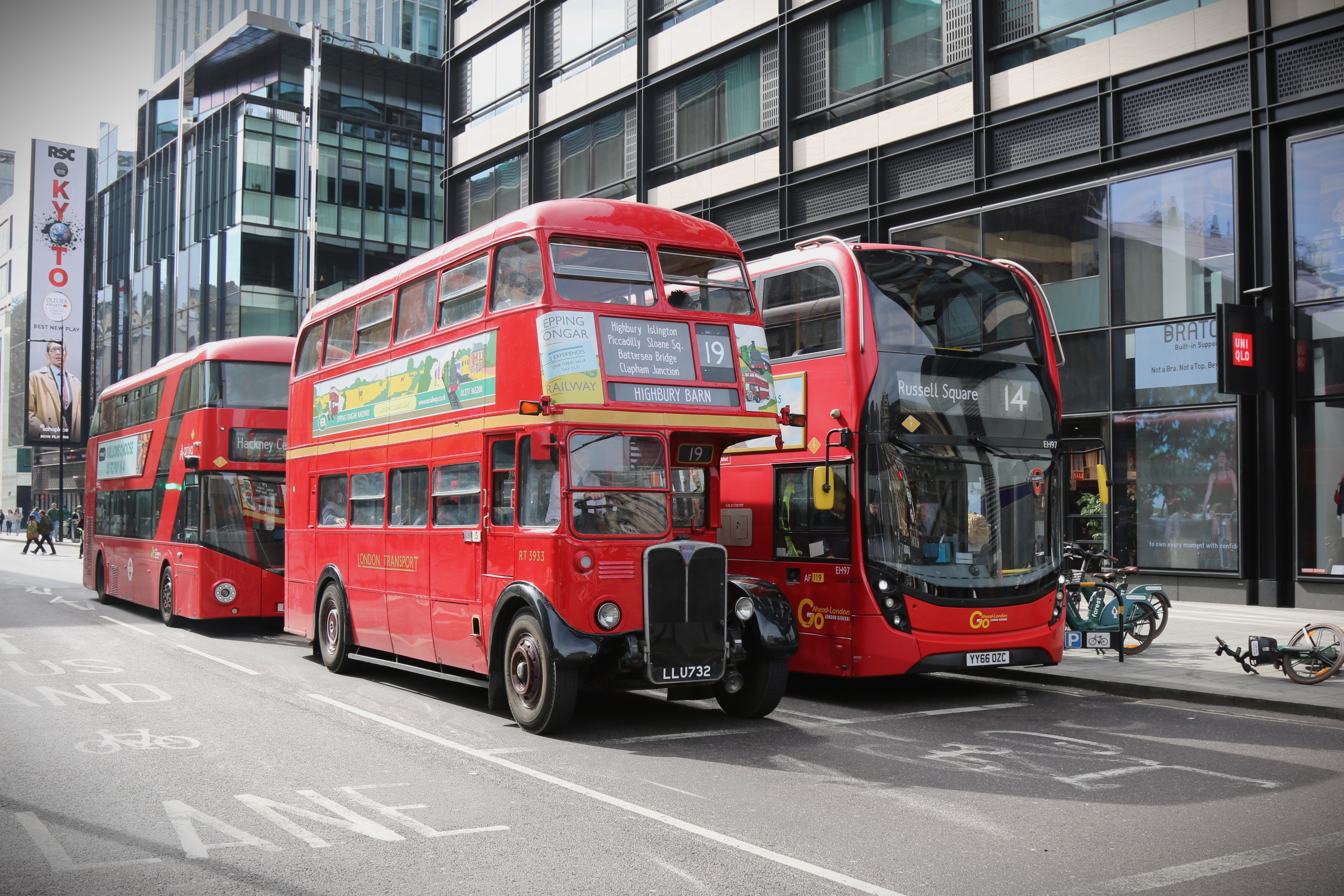
A 1950s AEC Regent III with several modern London double-decker buses on Charing Cross Road in 2025

Buses have been used as a mode of public transport in London since 1829, when George Shillibeer started operating a horse-drawn omnibus service from Paddington to the City of London. In the decades since their introduction, the red London bus has become a symbol of the city. In 2019, buses accounted for 11 percent of trips taken in the city.

As of 2025, London has 675 bus routes served by over 8,900 buses, almost all of which are operated by private companies under contract to (and regulated by) London Buses, part of the publicly owned Transport for London. Over 3,000 buses in the fleet are battery electric and hydrogen fuel cell buses, the largest zero emission bus fleet in Europe (ahead of Moscow). In December 2005, London became one of the first major cities in the world to have an accessible, low floor bus fleet.

== History ==
Management of London Transport 1933-2000
Dates	Organisation	Overseen by
1933–1947	London Passenger Transport Board	London County Council
1948–1962	London Transport Executive	British Transport Commission
1963–1969	London Transport Board	Minister of Transport
1970–1984	London Transport Executive (Greater London only)	Greater London Council
1970–1984	London Country Bus Services (Green Line only)	National Bus Company
1984–2000	London Regional Transport	Secretary of State for Transport
2000–	Transport for London	Mayor of London

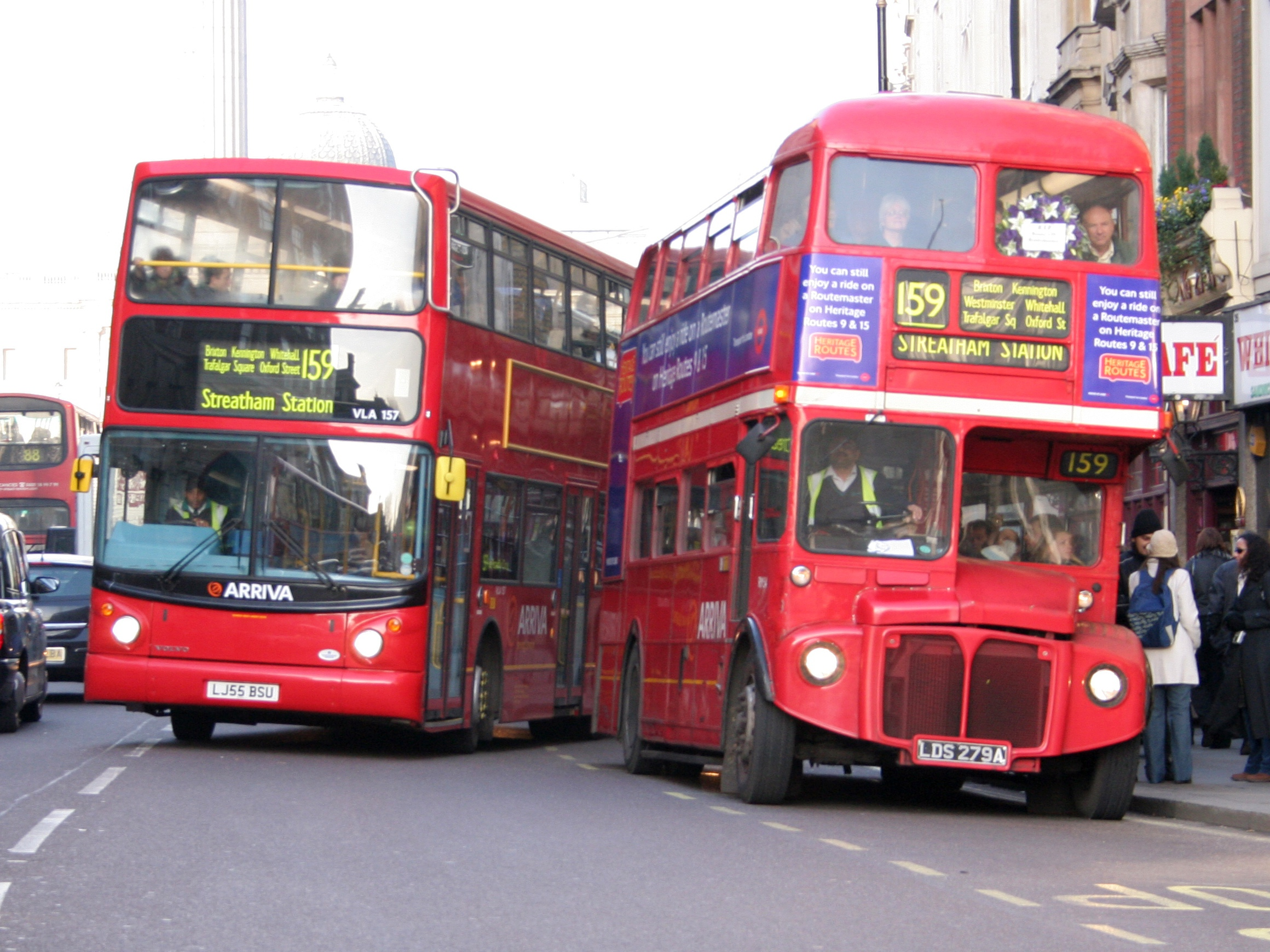
A 2005 Alexander ALX400 passing a 1963 AEC Routemaster

Buses have been used on the streets of London since 1829, when George Shillibeer started operating his horse-drawn omnibus service from Paddington to the City. In 1850, Thomas Tilling started omnibus services, and in 1855 the London General Omnibus Company (LGOC) was founded to amalgamate and regulate the horse-drawn omnibus services then operating in London.

The LGOC began using motor omnibuses in 1902, and manufactured them itself from 1909. In 1904, Thomas Tilling started its first motor bus service. The last LGOC horse-drawn omnibus ran on 25 October 1911, although independent operators used them until 1914.

In 1909, Thomas Tilling and the LGOC entered into an agreement to pool their resources. The agreement restricted the expansion of Thomas Tilling in London, and allowed the LGOC to lead an amalgamation of most of London's bus services. However, also in 1909, Thomas Clarkson started the National Steam Car Company to run steam buses in London in competition with the LGOC. In 1919, the National company reached agreement with the LGOC to withdraw from bus operation in London, and steam bus services ceased later that year.

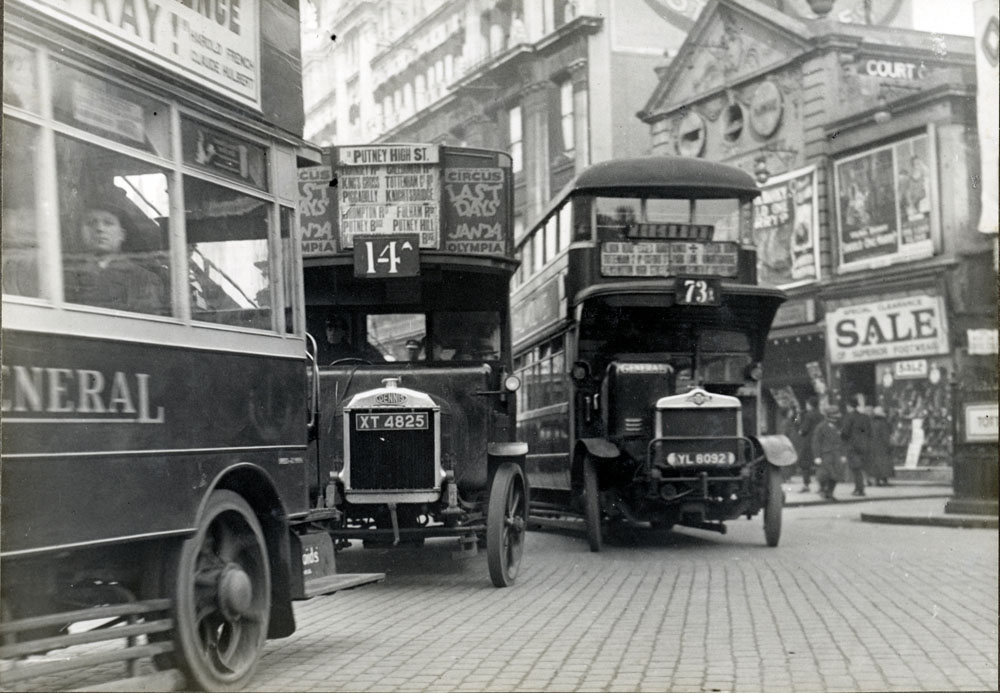
Early days: London General omnibuses in 1927

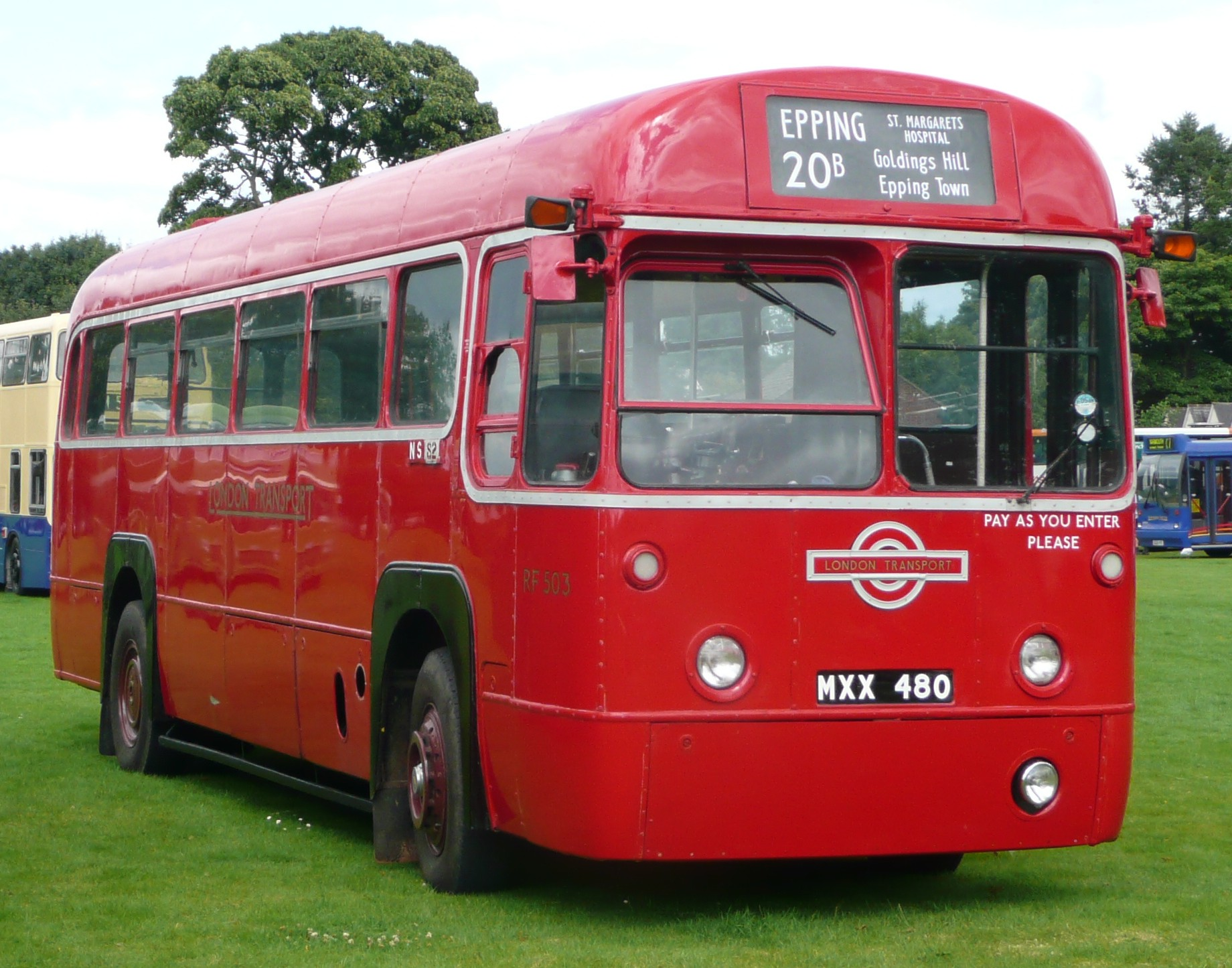
The London Transport brand continued on buses until 1986

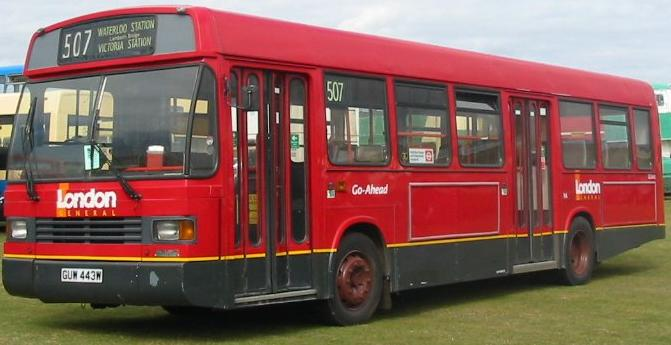
A post-privatisation London bus bearing private operator branding

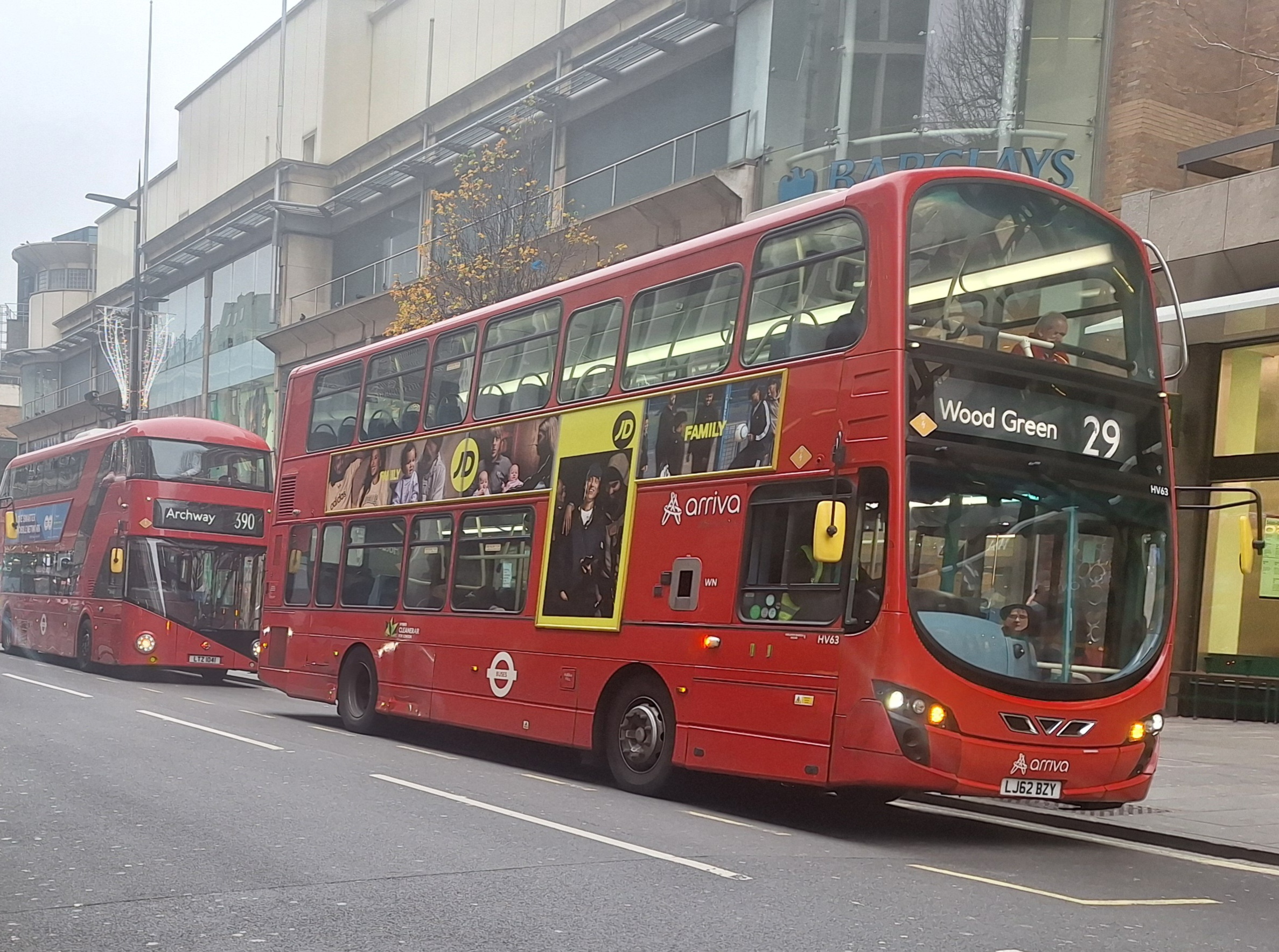
Modern buses bearing TfL branding and current London Red livery

Initially, buses in London were regulated with very limited oversight, licensed by the Police in a similar manner as taxicabs are licensed today, anyone could provide a bus service according to their best commercial judgement. After the First World War, many demobilised soldiers had learned to operate and maintain heavy vehicles like buses and established bus companies. In 1922, the Chocolate Express ran its first services, and many other independent operators entered the market until by 1924, the market was saturated with small independent bus companies which depressed patronage from established railways and larger bus companies – the worst affected being the London County Council's tramways which ran at a deficit. Management's efforts to control costs lead to a strike across the whole network, which was shortly followed by the major bus companies and railways in London.

Some of the bus operators in London included;

- London General Omnibus Company
- Admiral Omnibus
- Amersham & District Motor Bus & Haulage Co.Ltd
- Ashley and Westwood Omnibuses
- Birch Brothers
- Capitol Buses
- Chocolate Express
- City Motor Omnibus Ltd.
- Darenth Bus Service
- East Surrey
- Elite Omnibus Service of Watford
- Henry Turner of Wandsworth
- Imperial of Romford
- London Public Omnibus Company
- National Omnibus Company
- Orange Omnibus Company Ltd.
- Overground
- Premier Omnibus Company
- Prince Omnibus
- The Reliable Omnibus & Motor Coaches
- Renown
- Royal Highlander
- Sevenoaks Motor Services
- St. Alban's & District
- Thomas Tilling
- United
- Watford Omnibus
- Westminster Omnibus Company
- Woking & District

=== London Passenger Transport Board to London Regional Transport ===
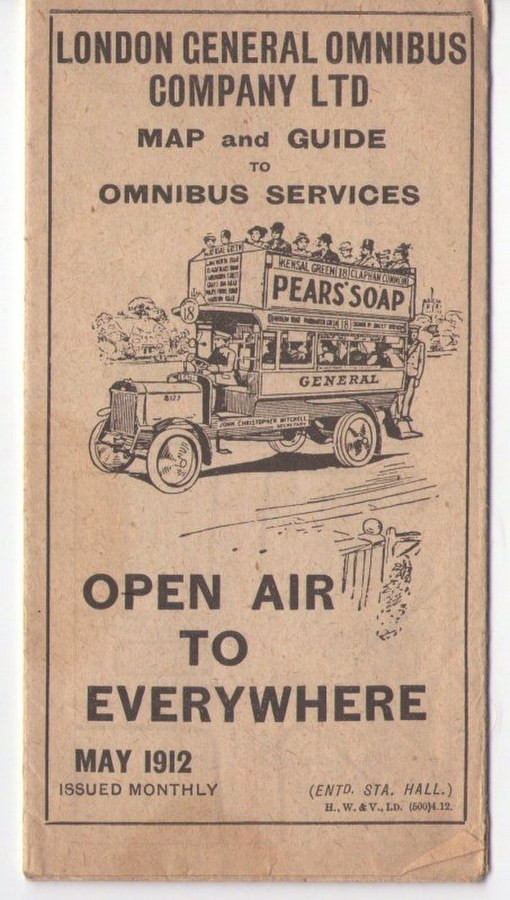
Cover

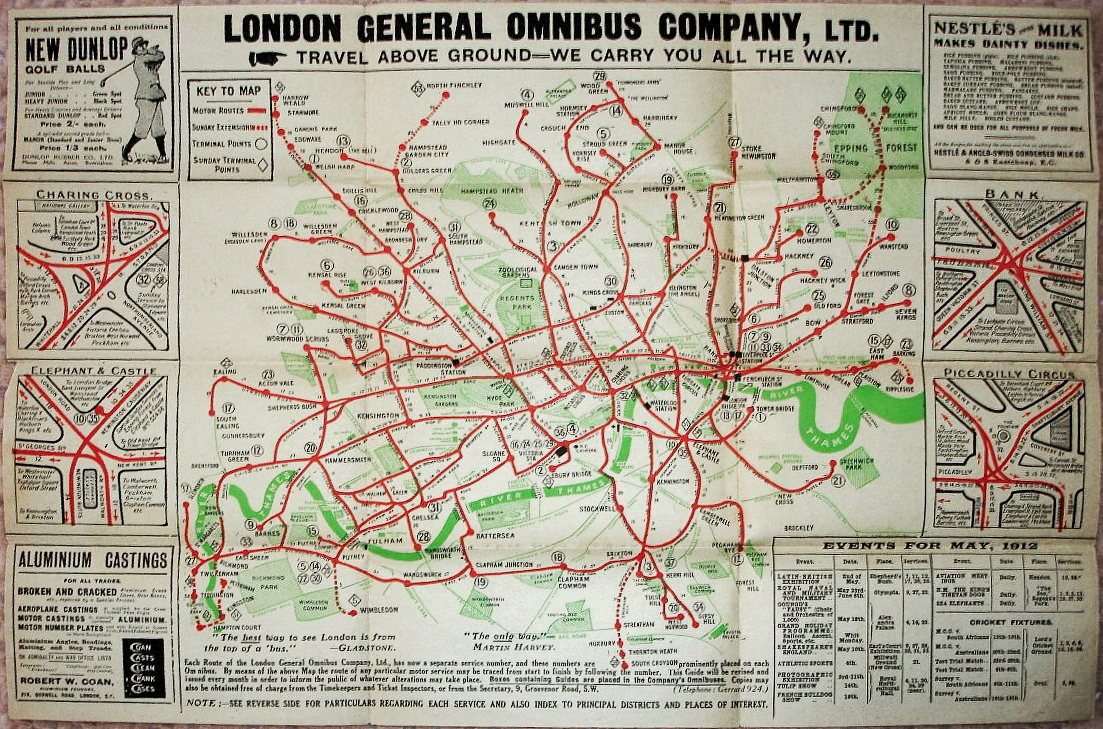
Map

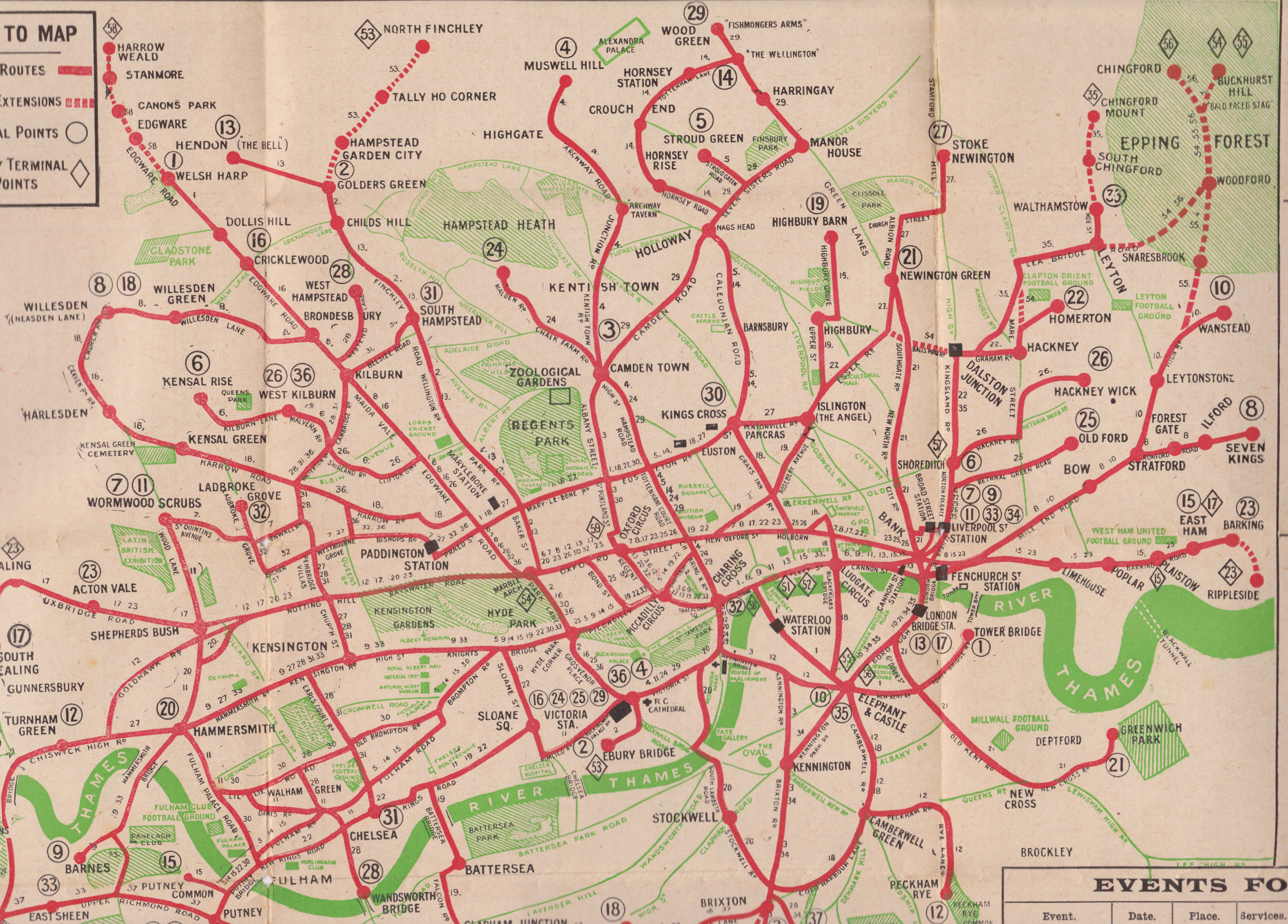
Zoom of central area

May 1912 London General Omnibus Company route map, showing the first 50 or so bus routes, many of which are broadly unchanged to the present day

In 1912, the Underground Electric Railways Company of London (UERL), which at that time owned most of the London Underground, bought the LGOC. In 1933, the LGOC, along with the rest of the UERL, became part of the new London Passenger Transport Board (LPTB). The name London General was replaced by London Transport, which became synonymous with the red London bus.

Bus numbers were first used in 1906. When the independent firms started in 1922, they used General route numbers, along with alphabetical suffixes to denote branch routes, so, for instance, the 36A ran parallel to the 36 for most of its route. In 1924, under the London Traffic Act, the Metropolitan Police was authorised to allocate route numbers, which all buses had to carry.

Under the direction of the Chief Constable responsible for traffic, A. E. Bassom, the LGOC were allocated numbers 1-199; the independent bus companies 200-299; country routes north of the Thames, working into the Metropolitan Police area, 300-399; country routes south of the Thames, working into the Metropolitan Police area, 400-499; Thames Valley routes working into the Met area, 500-510. All short, early morning, weekend or other special duties were to be given a suffix from the alphabet. To make way for these suffixes, previous suffix routes, denoting a branch, had to be renumbered in the one hundreds, so therefore, 36A became 136. Soon there were not enough route numbers and the police had to allocate 511-599 to the independents and 600-699 to the LGOC.

This ultimately led to chaos, and in the London Passenger Transport Act 1933 the power to allocate route numbers was taken away from the police and handed once again to professional busmen. Suffixes were gradually abolished over the decades, the last such route in London being the 77A, which became the 87 in June 2006.

The LPTB, under Lord Ashfield, assumed responsibility for all bus services in the London Passenger Transport Area, an area with a radius of about 30 miles from Central London. This included the London General country buses (later to be London Transport's green buses), Green Line Coaches and the services of several Tilling Group and independent companies.

London buses continued to operate under the London Transport name from 1933 to 2000, although the political management of transport services changed several times. The LPTB oversaw transport from 1933 to 1947, when it was nationalised and became the London Transport Executive (1948 to 1962). The responsible authority for London Transport was then successively the London Transport Board (1963 to 1969), the Greater London Council (1970 to 1984) and London Regional Transport (1984 to 2000). However, in 1969, a new law transferred the green country services, outside the area of the Greater London Council, to the recently formed National Bus Company. Trading under the name London Country, the green buses and Green Line Coaches became the responsibility of a new NBC subsidiary, London Country Bus Services, on 1 January 1970.

Despite a comprehensive replacement of the bus fleet in the early 1950s, bus ridership fell dramatically – from 4.5 billion in 1950, to 3.1 billion by 1962 – while private car ownership rapidly increased. A seven week strike from April to June 1958 led to £2m in lost revenue to London Transport and contributed to a 4,000 shortage in drivers and conductors at that time. In addition, a fall in London's population by over a million people exacerbated the fall in ridership.

A former network of express buses operated by London Transport in Central London was the Red Arrows. The routes, all numbered in the 500s, ran from main line stations to various locations in the West End and City. They were introduced in 1966 and expanded in 1968, but in the 1990s they were gradually phased out, with the last two routes withdrawn in 2023.

In 1974, Jill Viner became the first female bus driver for London Transport.

In 1979, the operation of London's buses under the GLC was divided among eight areas or districts:

District	Area	Logo (positioned above LT roundel)
Abbey	West central	Coronet
Cardinal	West and Southwest	Bust of Thomas Wolsey
Forest	East and Northeast (after Epping Forest)	Squirrel
Leaside	North (after River Lea)	Swan
Selkent	Southeast	Hops
Tower	East central	White Tower
Wandle	South (after River Wandle)	Water wheel
Watling	Northwest	Bust of Roman soldier

The districts were later reorganised and reduced to six (with the abolition of Tower and Watling), and, following the Transport Act of 1985, were done away with in 1989 with privatisation imminent.

=== Privatisation ===
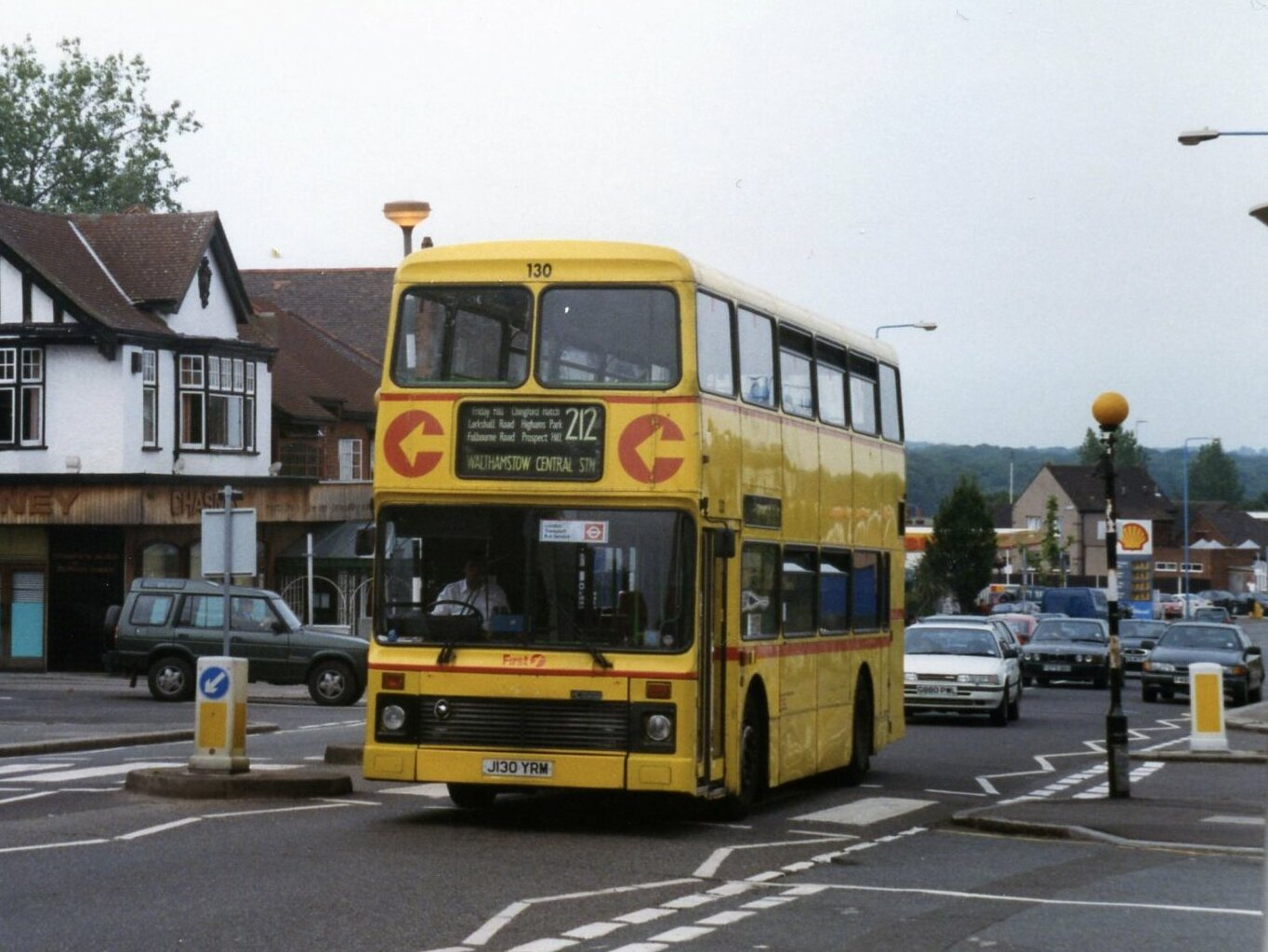
Bus operators did not have to paint their buses red - such as this Capital Citybus in 1999

In the 1980s the government of Margaret Thatcher decided to privatise the bus operating industry in Great Britain. At the time, local bus transport was dominated by London Transport in London, and in other major cities by large municipally owned operators, as well as by the government-owned National Bus Company and Scottish Bus Group elsewhere. The Transport Act 1985 brought about bus deregulation throughout Great Britain which opened up local bus operation to private operators and required municipal companies to operate independently of local government on a commercial basis.

However, the Transport Act 1985 did not apply in London – instead, the London Regional Transport Act 1984 required that an arms-length subsidiary company of London Transport called London Buses to be set up. London Buses would specify details of routes, fares and services levels, and the running of bus services would be contracted to private companies on a tendered basis. From 1985, bus routes were gradually tendered out to private companies, with London Buses split into business units from 1989. These business units were sold off in the private sector in the mid 1990s. Controversially, private operators were allowed to run buses in colours other than the traditional red. Following a campaign by tourism groups, tender specifications since 1997 specify that buses in London be 80% red.

Despite proposals from the Government in the 1990s to deregulate bus routes in London, the bus tendering regime is still in place today, with individual bus routes put out to competitive tendering by private companies. In 2024, Mayor of London Sadiq Khan pledged to bring bus routes back into public ownership as contracts expire.

=== Growth ===
In 2000, as part of the formation of the new Greater London Authority, the management of buses in London moved from the central government controlled London Regional Transport to the Mayor of London's transport body, Transport for London (TfL). Upon appointment in 2000, the new Mayor of London, Ken Livingstone did not have the power to improve Tube service. Instead, investment was directed to increasing the number of, and the frequency of London's bus routes, as well as introducing more bus lanes – assisted by income from the congestion charge. Flat fares were introduced in 2004, to speed boarding. From September 2005, under 16's were able to ride buses for free.

Bus ridership subsequently rose rapidly, with a 19 per cent growth in passengers between 1999/00 and 2002/03, with ridership was at levels last seen in the late 1960s. Between 2000 and 2006, ridership growth was at 40 per cent in London, while ridership in the rest of the country fell by 6 per cent. The bus fleet grew to cope with demand, from around 5,500 buses to over 8,000. Traffic speeds across London improved, and levels of air pollution in central London decreased. By 2010, bus journeys in London had increased by 69 per cent since 2000, despite the growth rate in passengers slowing since the late 2000s.

From 2013 onwards, bus ridership fell slowly, with TfL blaming traffic congestion and roadworks, and some commentators blaming the introduction of Cycle Superhighways under Mayor Boris Johnson. The fall in ridership was mitigated by the introduction of the hopper fare in 2018, which allowed passengers to make multiple bus journeys within 1 hour. In 2019, buses accounted for 11% for daily trips in London.

=== Proposed bill of rights ===
In July 2026, Keith Prince, a Reform member of the London Assembly, introduced a motion he called a "bill of rights", which proposed certain employment rights for bus drivers including measures to improve safety, rest, toilet facilities, dignity, air cooling and heaters. There were rallies outside the Transport for London headquarters in August and October.

In September 2026, TfL agreed to provide additional permanent toilet facilities, while Sadiq Khan rejected the proposal for potentially going out-of-date very soon. In October 2026, TfL agreed to fund certain temporary toilet facilities for routes without facilities at either terminus. As of September 2026, TfL has implemented three of the twelve measures in the motion.

== Vehicles ==
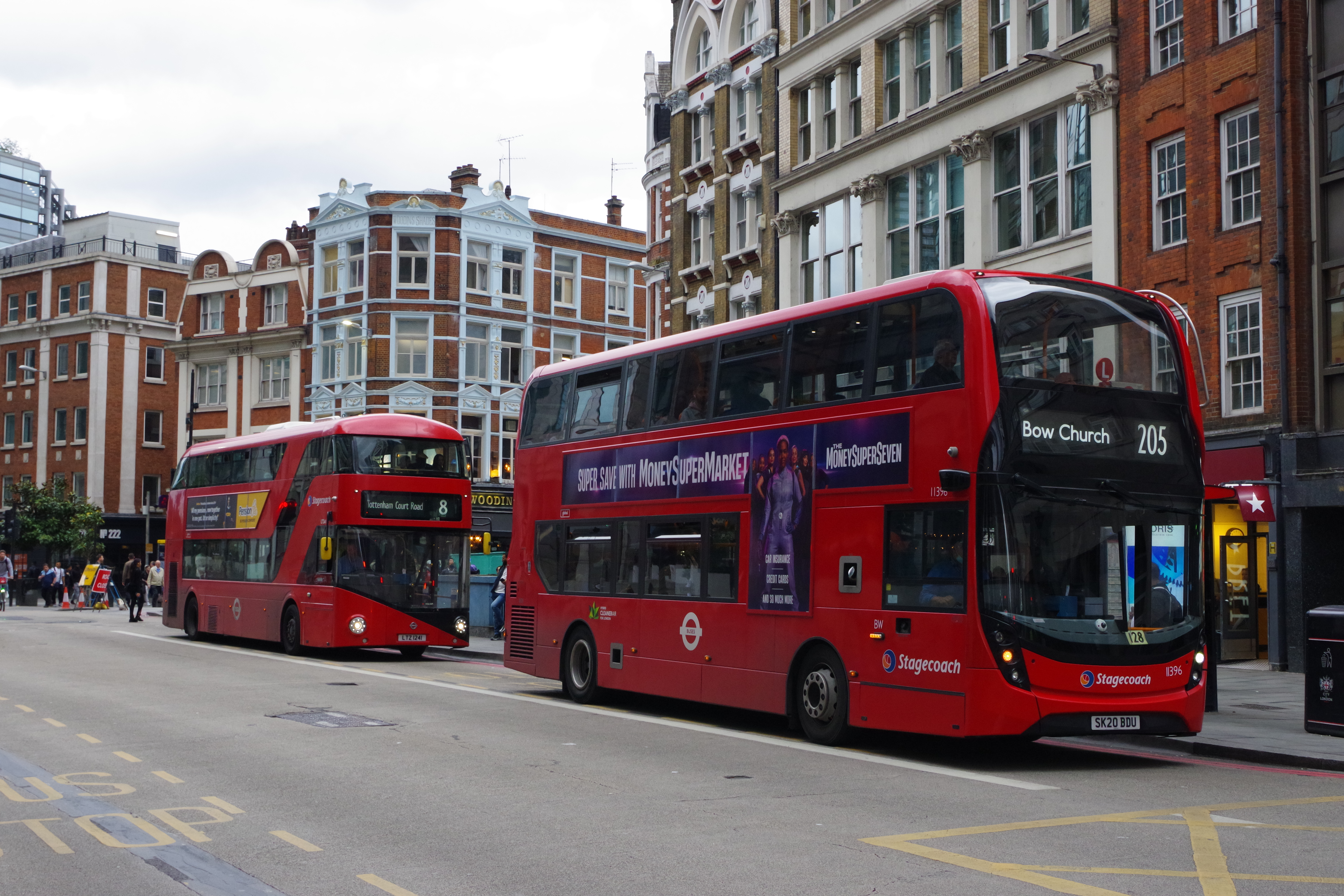
Double decker buses in Bishopsgate in June 2020, showing the traditional red colour livery

As of March 2025, the London Buses fleet total of 8,797 buses includes 3,776 hybrid buses, 1,951 battery electric buses, and 20 hydrogen fuel cell buses. All buses have been accessible and low floor since 2006, one of the first major cities in the world to achieve this.

The various bus operators operate a wide variety of vehicles, about the only immediately obvious common feature being their use of a largely red livery (mandatory since 1997). For each bus route, London Buses sets a specification for buses to be used, with the choice of particular vehicle that meets the specification left up to the operator. Particular examples of London Buses specification include the use of separate exit doors (increasingly unusual on buses in the United Kingdom outside London) and, on double-deckers, the use of a straight staircase. Additionally, London Buses has previously specified that vehicles operating in London use traditional printed roller destination blinds, whereas in most other parts of the country, electronic dot matrix or LED displays are the norm on new buses.

=== History ===
From the early days of motor bus operation by the London General Omnibus Company (LGOC) in the 1900s (decade) until the 1960s, London went its own way, designing its own vehicles specially for London use rather than using the bus manufacturers' standard products used elsewhere. The Associated Equipment Company (AEC) was created as a subsidiary of the LGOC in 1912 to build buses and other equipment for its parent company, and continued in the ownership of LGOC and its successors until 1962. Many of London's local service buses over this period were built by AEC, although other manufacturers also built buses to London designs, or modified their own designs for use in London.

The last bus specifically designed for London was the AEC Routemaster, built between 1956 and 1968. Since then, buses built for London's local services have all been variants of models built for general use elsewhere, although bus manufacturers would routinely offer a 'London specification' to meet specific London requirements. Some manufacturers even went so far as to build new models with London in mind such as the Daimler Fleetline and Leyland Titan.

London did see the introduction of several of the newly emerging minibus and midibus models in the 1980s and 1990s, in a bid to up the frequency on routes, although the use of these buses dropped off to the level of niche operation on routes not suitable for full size buses.

==== Introduction of low floor buses ====
London was one of the earliest major users of low-floor buses, with the first low-floor single decker vehicles entering service in 1993 and the first low-floor double decker vehicles entering service in 1998. From 2002, the mainstay of the fleet, double-decker buses, were augmented with a fleet of articulated buses, rising to a peak fleet size of 393 Mercedes-Benz Citaros. These were introduced to help replace the (high-floor) AEC Routemaster, as well as to cope with an increased capacity. Following withdrawal of older, high floor vehicles, the bus fleet became fully accessible at the end of 2005, 10 years ahead of the national requirement.

==== New Routemaster and bendy bus withdrawal ====
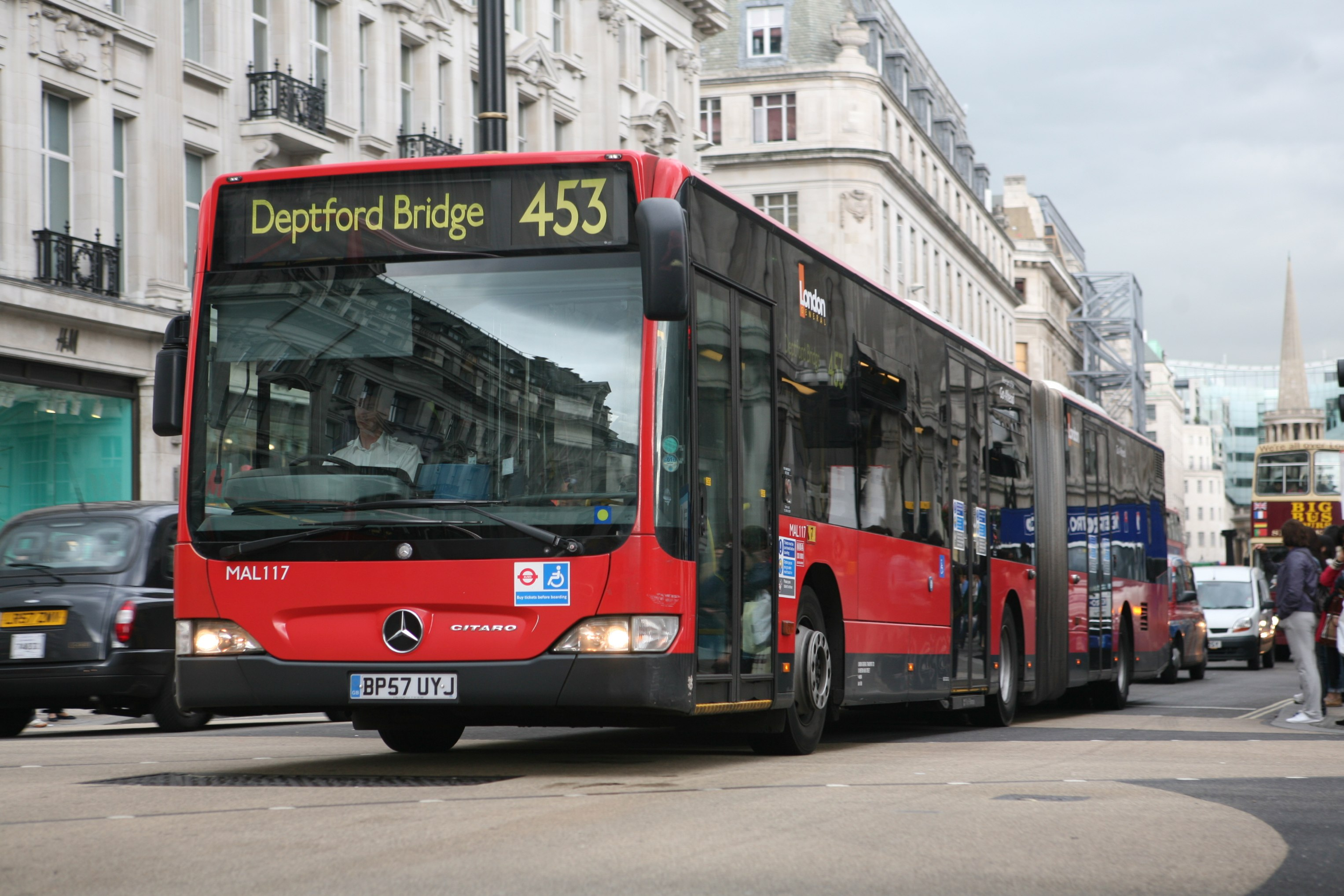
London General Mercedes-Benz Citaro articulated bus

In the 2008 London mayoral election campaign, prospective mayor Boris Johnson made several commitments to change the London Buses vehicle policy, namely to introduce a new Routemaster, and remove the bendy buses. Johnson was elected to office on 4 May 2008, and on 4 July 2008 TfL announced the New Bus for London Competition, in which conceptual and detailed design proposals would be sought for a new hybrid Routemaster, with development of a design that could be put into production hoped for completion by 2012 (the expected date of the next mayoral election).

In August 2008, the Commissioner of Transport for London Peter Hendy announced that the withdrawal of the bendy buses would take place, starting in 2009. To reduce additional costs to TfL, the articulated buses would be withdrawn as their 5-year operating contracts came up for renewal, with the replacement buses being decided by operators. Options for replacement would not preclude such measures as tri-axle buses. However, research by London TravelWatch in 2008 indicated that replacing articulated buses with double decker models would be more expensive, as additional vehicles would be required to maintain overall route capacity (capacity of 85 per bus versus 120).

The first buses to be withdrawn would be the Red Arrow fleet on routes 507 and 521 in May 2009. The last were withdrawn on 9 December 2011.

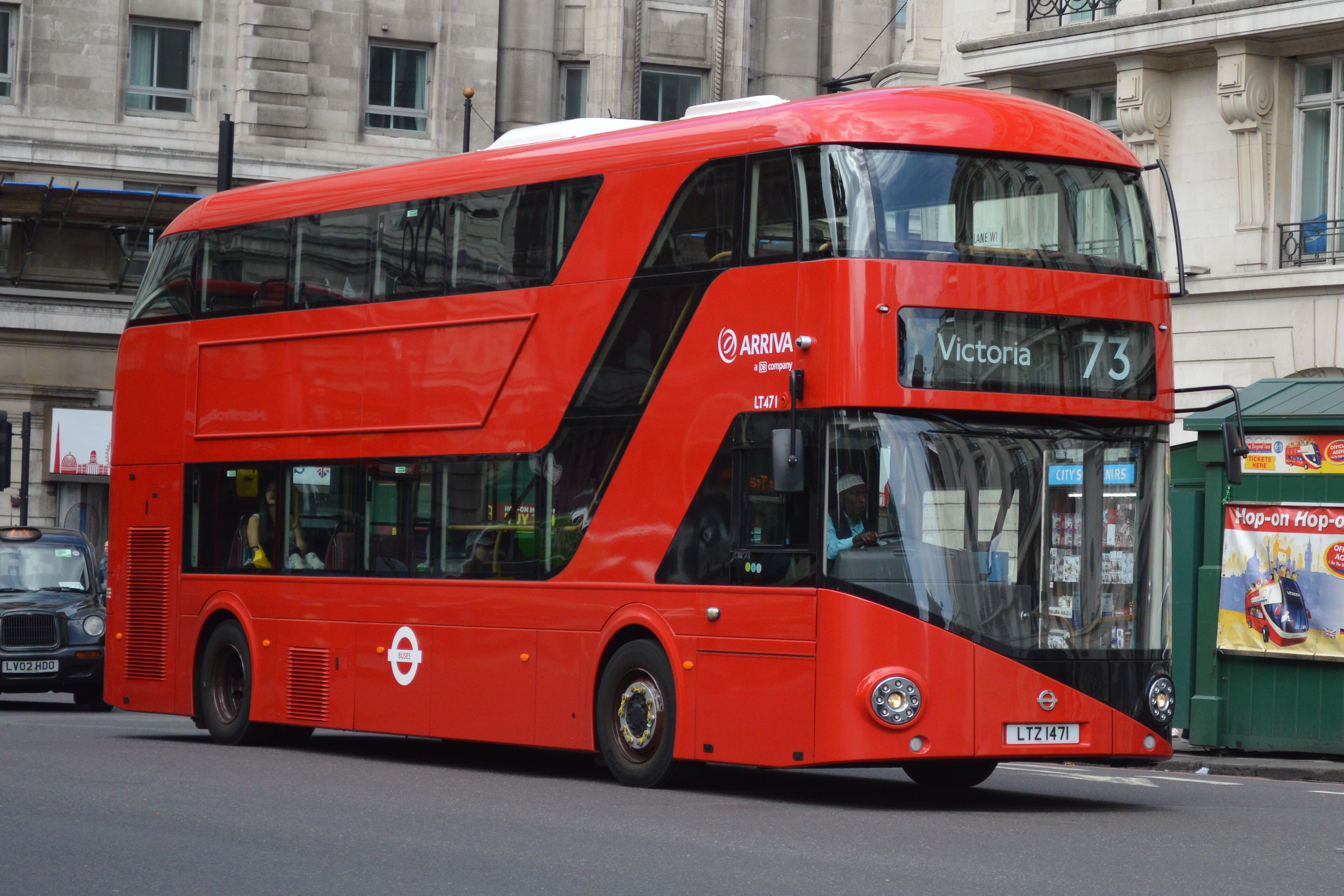
New Routemasters gradually replaced all articulated buses in London

In May 2010, Mayor of London Boris Johnson unveiled the design of the New Routemaster, the proposed replacement for the Routemaster as an iconic standard bus for exclusive use in London. The buses, designed by Heatherwick Studio and built by Wrightbus feature two staircases, three doors and an open platform allowing passengers to hop on and off, and commenced operating in 2012. In December 2011 the British car magazine Autocar praised the New Routemaster in a road test, rating it ahead of contemporary and historic buses.

However, in December 2016 the new Mayor of London Sadiq Khan decided that no more orders would be placed for the bus after only 1,000 of Johnson's envisaged fleet of 2,000 had been procured. In 2020, TfL announced that the New Routemasters would be converted so passengers only enter by the front door, with the middle and rear doors becoming exit-only. This was done to reduce fare evasion, which had been double that of other London buses.

==== Transition to zero emission bus fleet ====
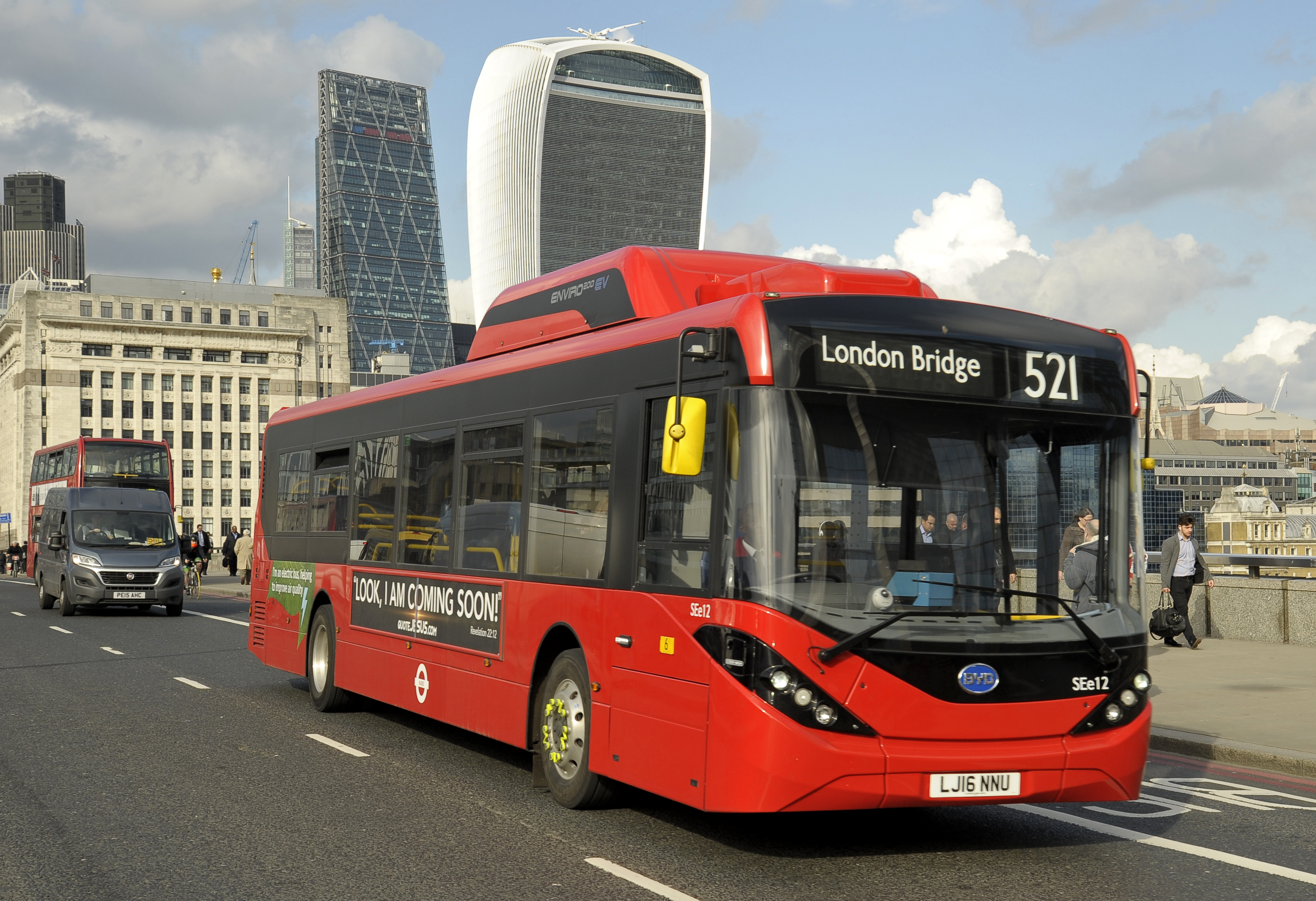
Zero-emission buses were introduced in London in 2013

Since the early 1990s, efforts have been underway to reduce the emissions of the bus fleet. Early work involved replacing older buses like the AEC Routemaster and fitting particulate filters to exhausts. In the 2000s, hybrid and hydrogen fuel cell buses were trialled – and the first hybrid buses entered service in 2006. It was originally intended that every bus introduced into service after 2012 would be a hybrid, but this requirement was later dropped.

Battery electric buses first entered service in 2013, and double decker hydrogen fuel buses were introduced in 2021. London now has the second largest zero-emission bus fleet in Europe with over 2,000 battery electric and hydrogen fuel cell buses in service. In 2021, it was announced that all buses in the fleet meet or exceed Euro VI emission standards, following the phasing out of older buses, the retrofitting of diesel vehicles and the introduction of new hybrid & electric buses.

The Mayor of London is currently aiming for a zero emission bus fleet by 2037. From 2021, all new buses entering the fleet are either electric or hydrogen zero emission buses. In June 2026, TfL announced that over 3,000 zero emission buses were in service, with 135 zero emission bus routes.

== Operation ==
=== Local buses ===
The typical design of a London bus stop flag. Light blue denotes a "night bus".

Most local buses within London form a network managed by London Buses, an arm of Transport for London. Services are operated by private sector companies under contract to London Buses. With the introduction of the London congestion charge in central London and because at peak times the Underground is operating at maximum capacity, many bus service improvements have been undertaken, and central bus services are currently enjoying something of a resurgence.

Although the rear-entrance double-deck AEC Routemaster is the archetypal London bus, they were withdrawn in the early 2000s owing to their age, their inability to comply with disability legislation or accept wheelchairs or pushchairs, and their requirement for a two-person crew.

All other local bus services are now operated by modern low-floor buses, which may be single-deck or double-deck. Most buses operating in London have two sets of doors, and passengers board the bus using the front door and alight using the rear door, whilst some buses on less busy routes have only one door. Since 2006, all buses are low-floor and accessible, accepting passengers in wheelchairs and other mobility impaired passengers.

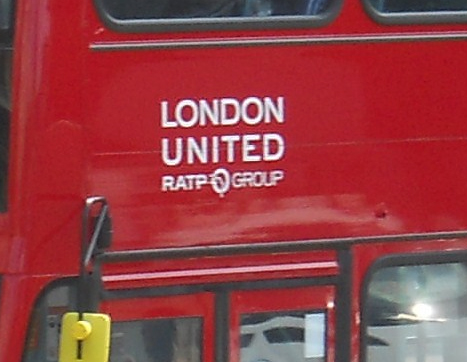
A London United bus bearing the logo of the RATP Group

Following the privatisation of London bus services in the 1990s, the operating contracts for local buses in London are subject to a system of competitive tender. A wide range of companies now operate bus routes across London. Many services have been contracted out to leading transport groups such as Arriva, ComfortDelGro, FirstGroup, Go-Ahead Group, Stagecoach and Transport UK Group. Abellio, Transit Systems. Connex, National Express, RATP Group and Transdev previously operated services in London.

Company	Routes	Parent company	
Company	Routes	Nationality	Name
Arriva London	London	(United Kingdom)	Arriva
Carousel Buses	Buckinghamshire	(United Kingdom)	Go-Ahead Group
First Beeline	Berkshire	(United Kingdom)	FirstGroup
First Bus London	London	(United Kingdom)	FirstGroup
Go-Ahead London	London	(United Kingdom)	Go-Ahead Group
Green Line Coaches	Express services to Berkshire & Hertfordshire	(United Kingdom)	Arriva
Metrobus	South & South East London, parts of Surrey, Kent, West and East Sussex.	(United Kingdom)	Go-Ahead Group
Metroline	North & West London	(Singapore)	ComfortDelGro
Stagecoach London	South & East London	(United Kingdom)	Stagecoach Group
Transport UK London Bus	South & West London, Surrey	(United Kingdom)	Transport UK Group
Uno	Hertfordshire & North London	(United Kingdom)	University of Hertfordshire

==== Limited stop / Express routes ====
A small number of bus routes (namely routes BL1, SL1, SL2, SL3, SL4, SL5, SL6, SL7, SL8, SL9 and SL10, run a daily limited-stop service, travelling a long distance but serving few stops in its route. These routes are now part of the wider London Superloop express bus network.

==== Other bus services ====
Some local bus routes in the outer areas of London cross the London boundary. London Buses services that cross the boundary have standard red buses, and charge London fares for the whole length. Buses from outside London that cross into London are in their operators' own colour schemes, and may not accept the London fares even within the boundary.

Privately run bus services may also be operated independently of the regulated London bus network, but still require a permit from TfL. This permit applies to any service which has a stop in London and another within 15 miles of Greater London, such as commuter coaches, school buses and supermarket shuttle buses.

=== Night buses ===
Night buses began running as early as 1913, and they form part of the London Buses network. For many years until 1961, the night routes were numbered from around 280 to 299. But the imminent withdrawal of trolleybuses meant that numbers between 1 and 299 were in short supply. The 280+ route numbers were freed by giving night bus routes a prefix N for the first time. For example, while route 9 travels from Aldwych to Hammersmith, route N9 continues a further 16 miles (26 km) from Hammersmith to Heathrow Terminal 5.

There are also 24-hour routes, which run throughout the day and night. These do not have distinguishing numbers. Some of these only run at night during weekends, whereas others run throughout the week.

=== Heritage routes ===
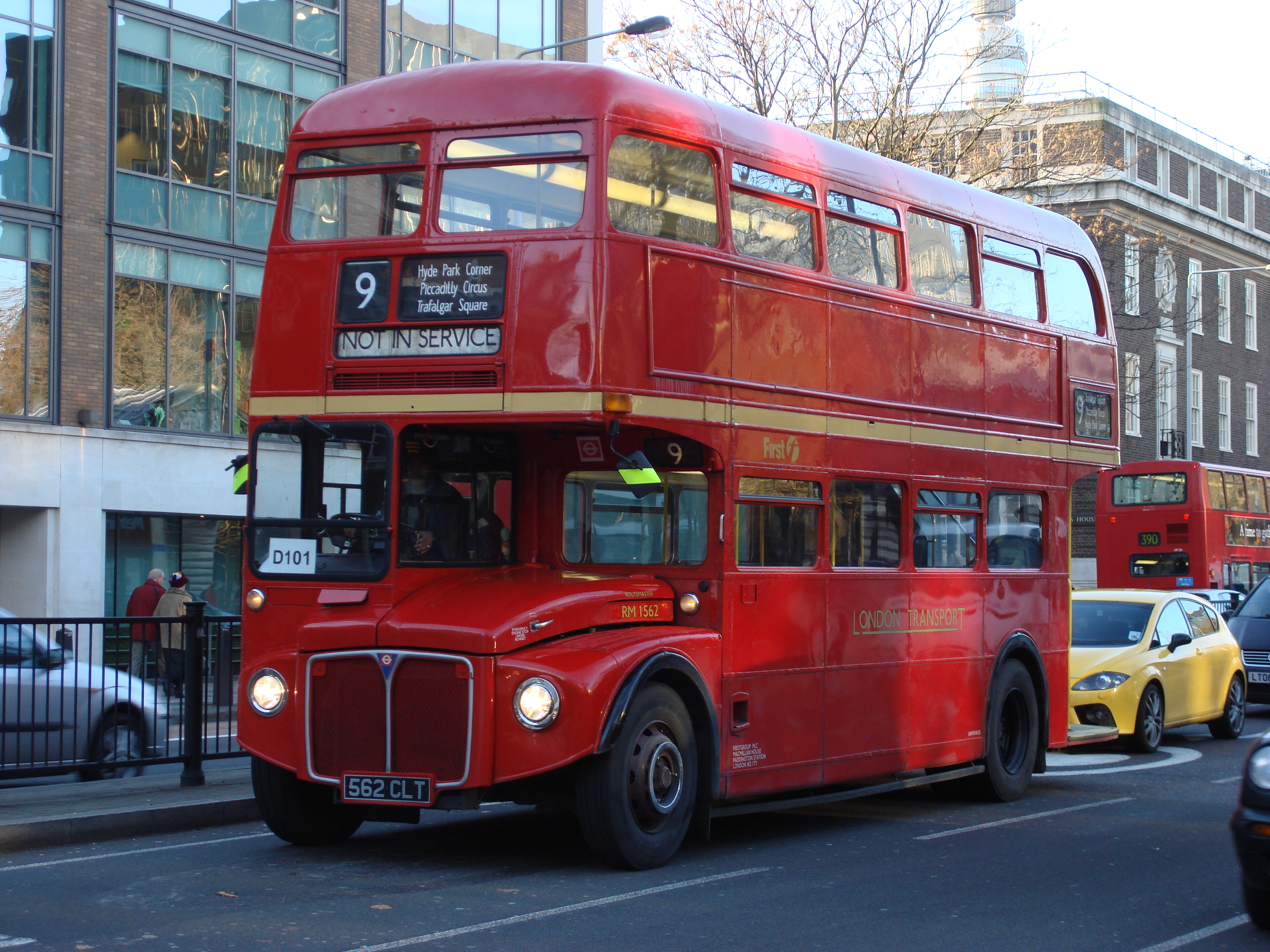
A First London AEC Routemaster on heritage route 9

Following the withdrawal of rear-entrance double-deck AEC Routemaster from all regular service routes in 2005, a small fleet was retained to operate on heritage routes. As the AEC Routemaster buses were not accessible to passengers in wheelchairs and other mobility impaired passengers, the heritage route was operated as a short-working of a regular service route bearing the same route number, thus ensuring that passengers unable to board the heritage buses are offered equivalent alternative transport arrangements.

Initially running on route 9 and route 15, Route 9H was withdrawn on 26 July 2014. In 2019, the remaining heritage route 15 was cut back to a seasonal service, running on weekends and bank holidays through the summer. In 2021, TfL announced that the heritage route would not return following the COVID-19 pandemic.

In 2022, a private operator started operating 'Route A', a tourist focused heritage route between Piccadilly Circus and London Waterloo using AEC Routemaster buses. Unlike previous heritage routes, a higher fare is charged.

=== Tour buses ===
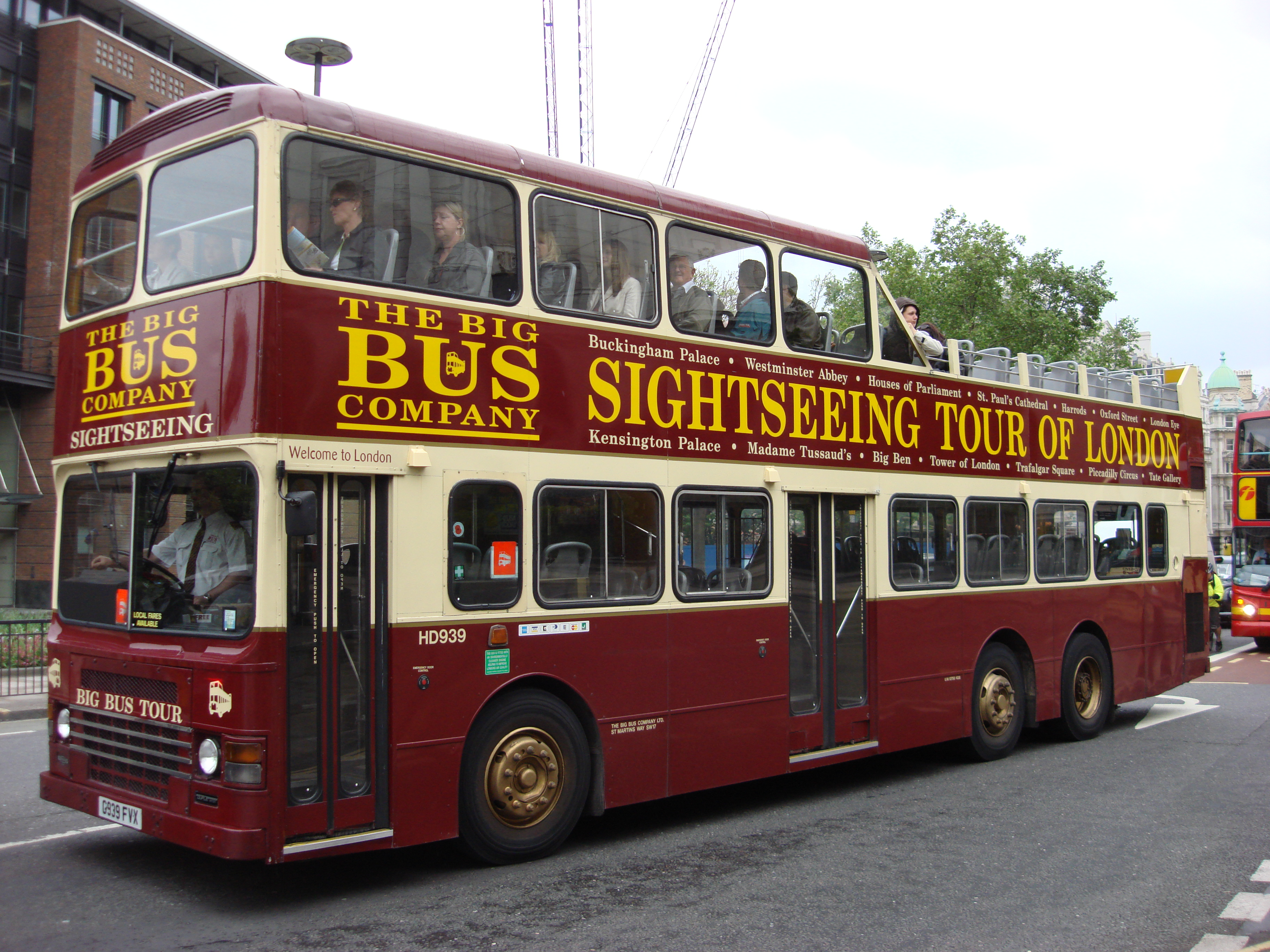
A partial open Big Bus Company top tour bus

A common sight in central London are tour buses, the majority being open-top buses. These are double-decker buses with a fully or partially open upper deck, which provide tourist services with either live or recorded commentary. Most of these services allow passengers to embark and disembark at any of the company's stops, continuing their journey on a later bus.

There are several competing operators of such services which do not form part of the London Buses network and do not issue or accept London Buses tickets, although at least one paints its buses in the same red as London's local buses.

Other tours use coaches and generally need to be booked in advance through travel agents.

=== Long distance coaches ===
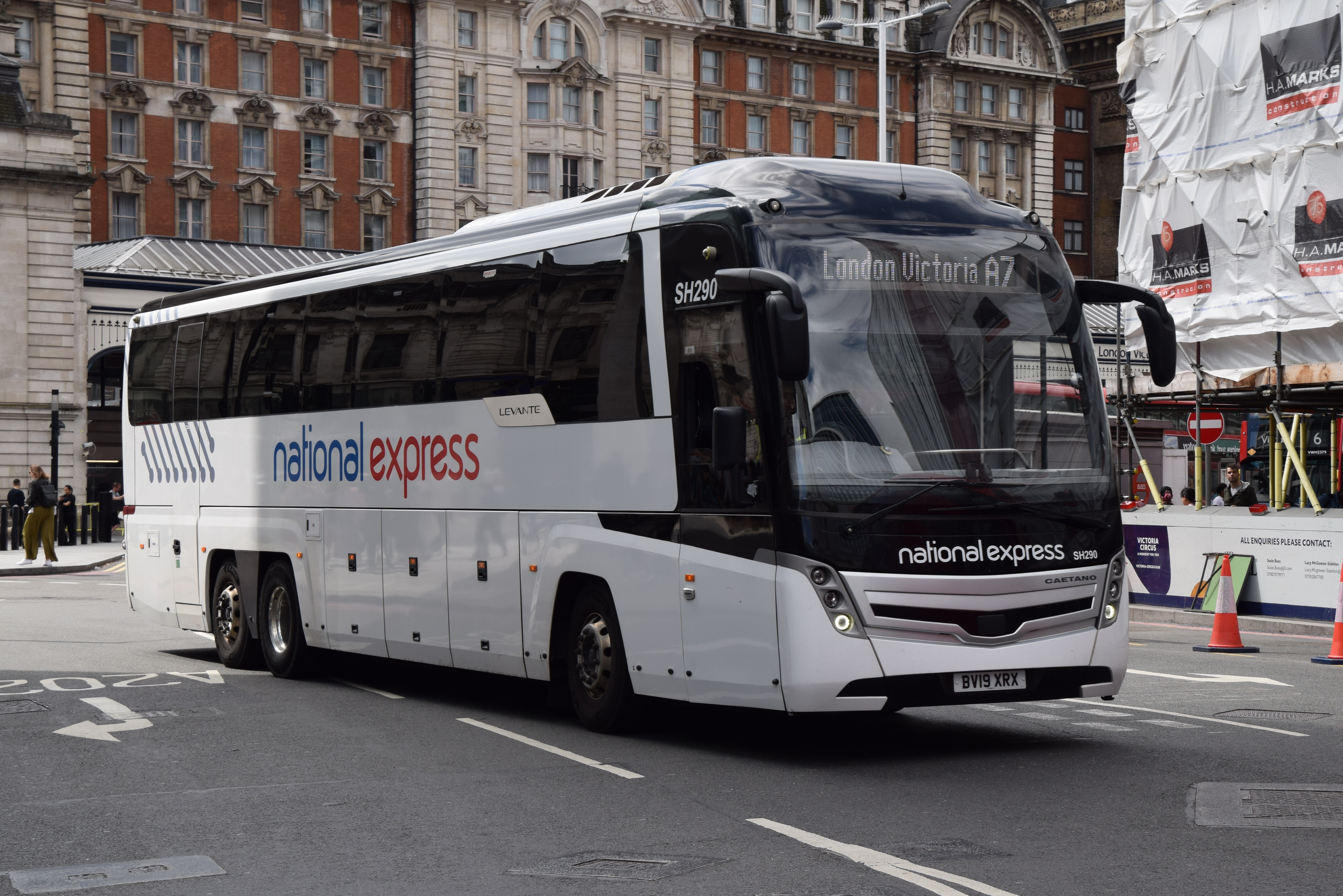
A typical National Express coach on a route serving London

Long-distance coaches link London with the rest of the United Kingdom and with other cities across the European mainland. Many domestic services are run by National Express Coaches, with international services mainly provided by FlixBus. National Express' predominantly white vehicles are common on the roads of central London, on their way to and from their terminus at Victoria Coach Station.

In 2006, competition for long-distance traffic was introduced by Megabus, a subsidiary of the large UK bus operating company Stagecoach. This company operates cheap services aimed at students and the like, which must be booked in advance on the internet.

Some services link London to medium-distance destinations, which use coach vehicles but are regulated as local buses, as they allow passengers to travel for journeys of less than 15 miles. Unlike National Express or Megabus, these services provide walk-on fares. Good examples of this are the Green Line services to the Home Counties, mainly operated by Arriva, the service to the city of Oxford, where Stagecoach's frequent Oxford Tube service runs, and the many commuter services to medium-distance destinations operated by individual coach companies during peak times.

=== Airport buses ===
National Express is also the principal airport bus operator, serving Heathrow, Gatwick and Stansted with its National Express Airport brand. Unlike their longer distance cousins, these are walk-on services, which serve stops throughout central London rather than running to Victoria Coach Station.

== Bus priority and bus lanes ==
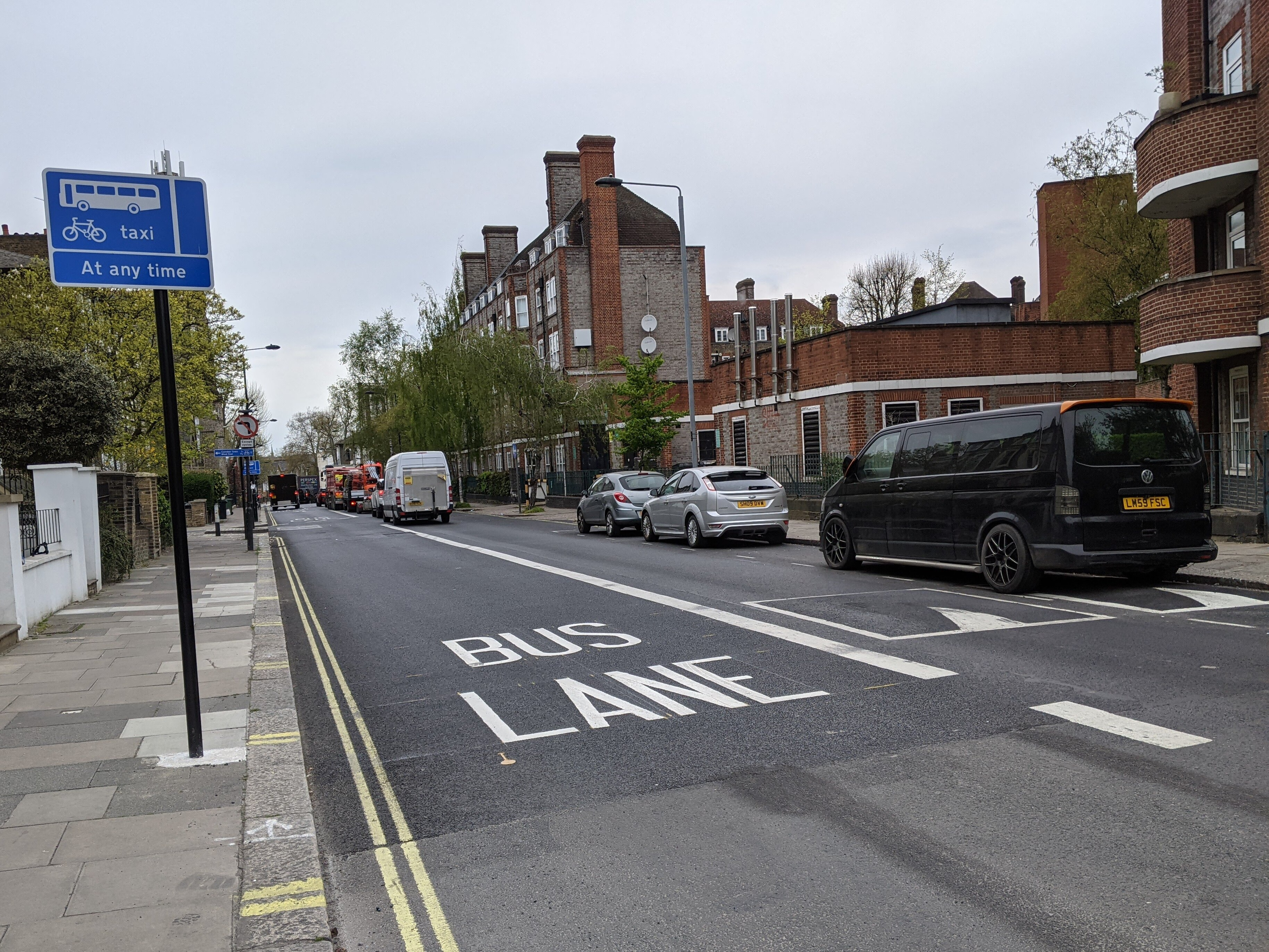
Sign and road markings denoting a bus lane

As of 2021, London has over 304 kilometres (189 mi) of bus lanes, which generally restrict use of a traffic lane to buses, taxis, motorcyclists and cyclists. Bus lanes are clearly marked with road markings and signs, and sometimes with red paving. Other bus priority measures used in London include over 4000 traffic lights that give buses priority, dedicated bus queue jump lanes and bus gates. Some streets (such as Oxford Street) are entirely designated as bus lanes, with no access for general traffic. Bus priority is enforced by TfL, usually by closed-circuit television or cameras mounted to the front of buses.

=== Bus lanes ===
The first bus lane in London was introduced on Vauxhall Bridge on 26 February 1968. This bus lane was estimated to have saved "up to 182 hours of passenger time" each day. In 1972, Oxford Street was designated a bus lane during peak hours, reportedly causing an increase of £250,000 in retail sales. By 1977, over 130 bus lanes had been installed across London, totalling around 40 kilometres (25 mi) in length. Despite this, London Transport considered that bus lanes were "spread thinly" across London, with many bottlenecks remaining. From the early 1990s, work to address substantial traffic congestion in London led to the introduction of red routes (which prohibit vehicles stopping, loading or unloading along them), as well as a larger rollout of bus lanes. By 1997, over 377 bus lanes were in place across London. Research showed that bus routes with bus lanes along them had journey time improvements of around 14 per cent, as well as ridership improvements around 15 per cent. Enforcement of bus lanes with cameras began in 1997.

In 2020, TfL announced that they would convert all bus lanes in London to 24/7 operation. This was made permanent in December 2021, with TfL stating that bus journey times had reduced and service reliability had improved. TfL aims to add 25 kilometres (16 mi) more bus lanes by 2025.

=== Traffic light priority ===
Following a successful large-scale trial in 1987, London Transport began introducing selective vehicle detection to provide traffic light bus priority in the 1990s. This delivered journey time savings, as well as increased service reliability and reduced costs, as a smaller number of vehicles were required to deliver the same frequency. For example, it was estimated that route 15 could have a journey time 4 minutes shorter, due to the number of selective vehicle detection points passed.

Selective vehicle detection was replaced by the iBus system in the late 2000s, which uses the Global Positioning System instead of physical roadside equipment. iBus which tracks all London's buses, allowing passengers to be provided with audio-visual announcements and improved information on bus arrivals, as well as triggering bus priority at traffic lights. All buses in London were fitted with the iBus system by 2009. The system can shorten red traffic lights or extend green lights as necessary to give buses priority, with some traffic lights only giving priority when buses are delayed. A new iBus system will be introduced from the mid 2020s.

== Bus and coach stations ==
There are around 50 bus and coach stations across London, located at transport interchanges, town centres and other major destinations such as shopping centres and hospitals. The busiest coach station in London is Victoria Coach Station, which serves around 14 million passengers a year. Cromwell Road bus station in Kingston upon Thames is the largest London Buses bus station, with 17 bus stands.

== Major accidents and incidents ==
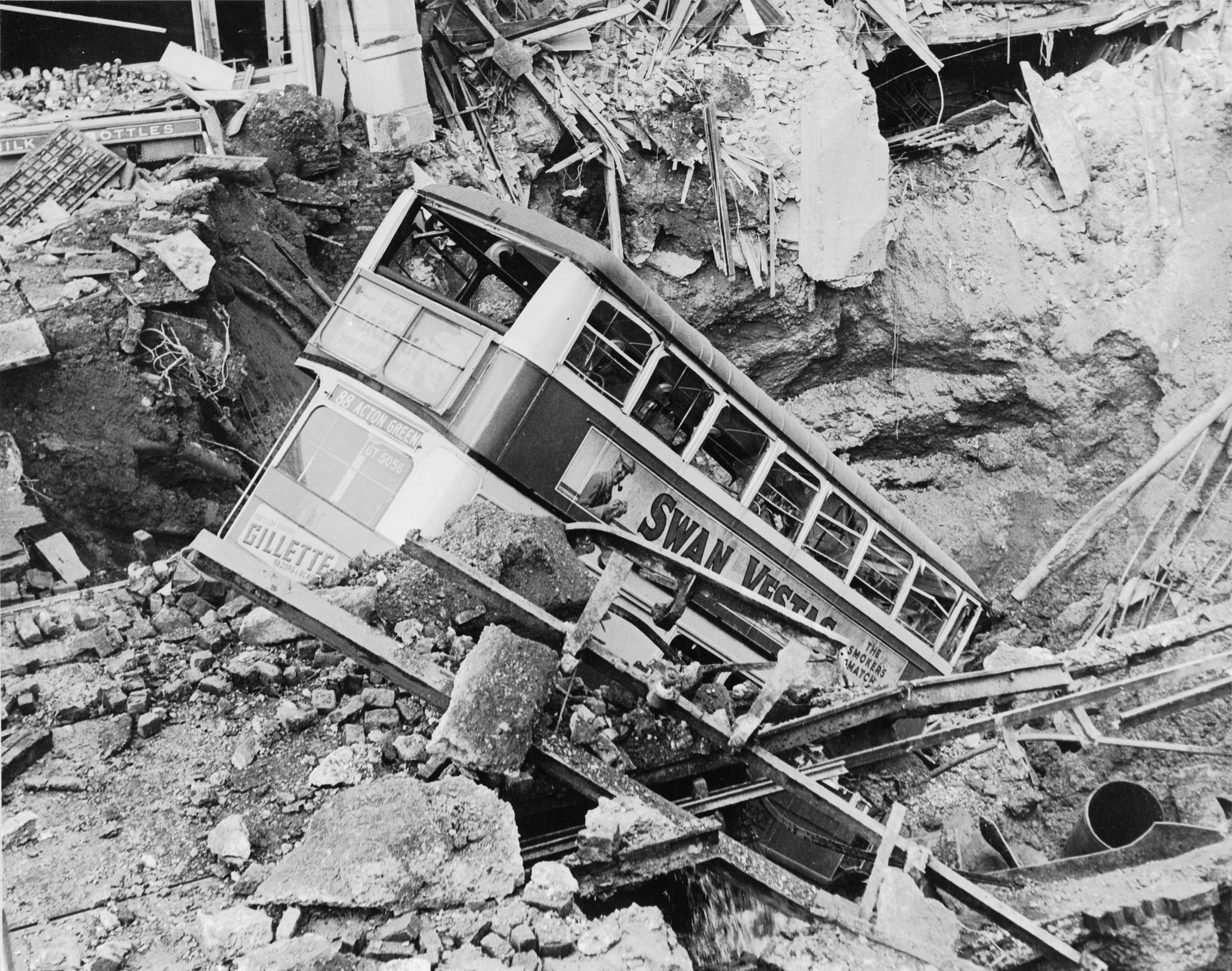
The damaged bus LT 669 in the bomb crater in Balham High Road, October 1940

- October 1940: During the London Blitz, LT 669, operating on route 88, was abandoned by its passengers and crew on Balham High Road seconds before a bomb fell, creating a huge crater into which the bus rolled. It was hauled out of the crater two weeks later.
- 13 June 1957: RTL 780, operating on route 7 collided with a queue of people at a bus stop in Oxford Street, resulting in eight deaths. The driver had collapsed with heat exhaustion.
- 18 February 1996: An explosive device detonated prematurely on a route 171 Catford to Holborn double-decker bus, operated by London Central, in Aldwych. The bomb killed Edward O'Brien, the IRA terrorist transporting the device, and injuring eight others including the driver. The force ripped the bus apart, destroying its front.
- 7 July 2005: An explosion occurred as part of a coordinated attack on London on a route 30 Hackney Wick to Marble Arch double-decker bus, operated by Stagecoach London, in Tavistock Square. The force ripped the roof off the top deck and destroyed the back of the bus, killing thirteen passengers and the suicide bomber.
- 21 July 2005: A suicide bomber attempted to explode a bomb as part of a second coordinated attack on London on a route 26 Waterloo station to Hackney Wick double-decker bus, operated by Stagecoach London, in Haggerston. The device failed to detonate properly and there were no injuries.
- 20 December 2013: 30 people were injured, and two critically, after a double-decker on route 59 crashed into a tree while swerving to avoid hitting a car in Kennington.
- 4 June 2014: 10 people on a night route N38 bus in Clapton were injured after the bus was smashed into by a passenger car racing at speeds of around 100 mph (160 km/h). The driver of the car lost his life and his front-seat passenger was critically injured.
- 18 July 2015: The roof of a double-decker on route 197 in South Norwood was ripped off under a bridge, with seven people injured.
- 15 May 2016: 17 people including four children were wounded when a double-decker bus operating on route 18 crashed into a shop in the town centre of Harlesden.
- 31 October 2019: A major road accident involving the route R11, route 358 and a car in Orpington, with one of the bus drivers losing his life and 15 others wounded.
- 25 January 2022: 19 people were injured after a double-decker bus operating on route 212 crashed into a shop in Highams Park.
- 18 May 2024: A single-decker Alexander Dennis Enviro200 bus on route 490 burnt down to a shell in the London Borough of Richmond upon Thames. Everybody was evacuated with no fatalities.

== Media ==
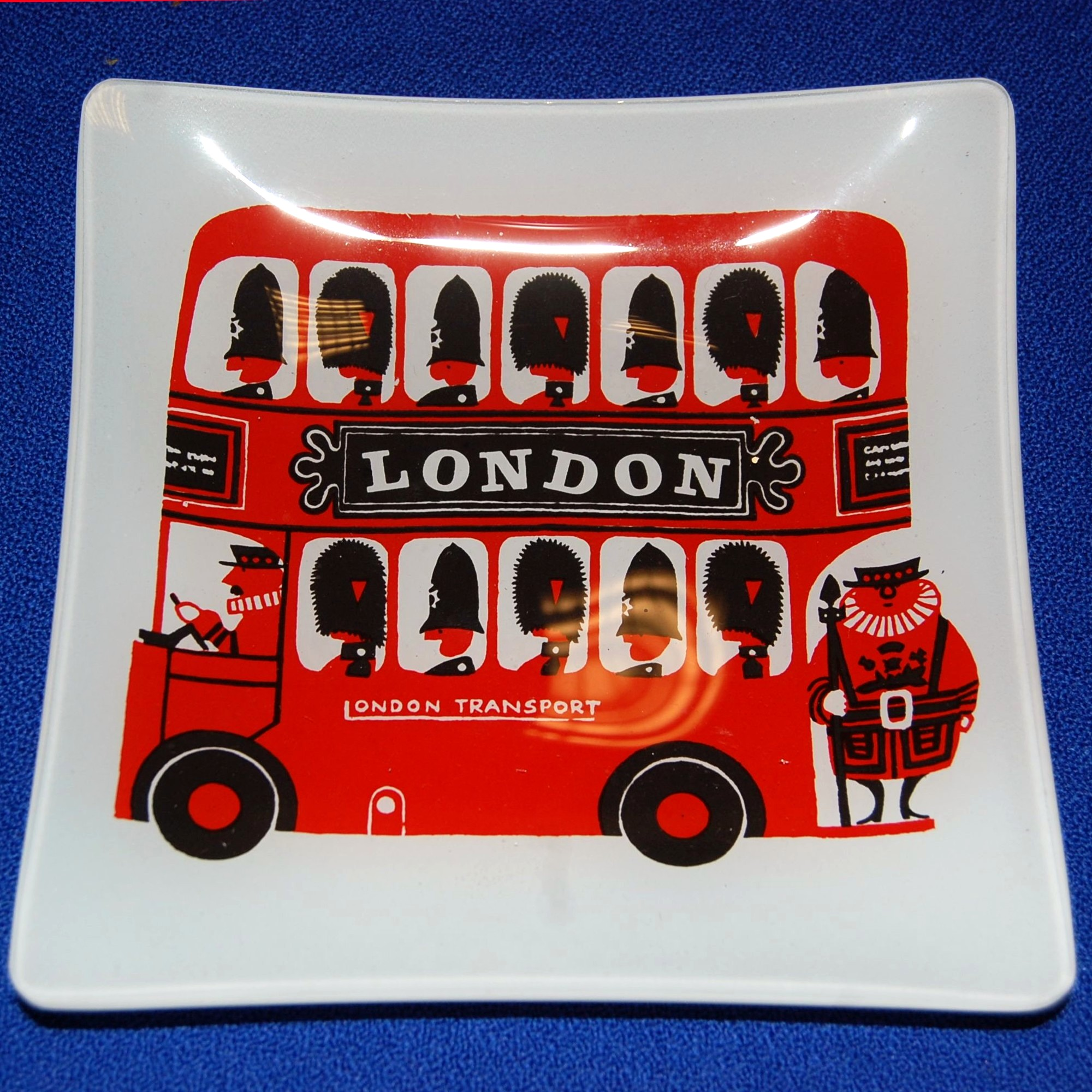
1970s glass ashtray by Chance Brothers of Smethwick, in the 'Sights of London' series, featuring a design by Kenneth Townsend

A revamped London bus has been used to promote the work of British artist Sir Peter Blake. An anthropomorphic Routemaster named Topper Deckington III is a fictional character in the Pixar movie Cars 2. In America: The Motion Picture the London buses appears as Walkers from Star Wars

== Facts and figures ==
Note that these figures only take Transport for London services into consideration, and exclude school and other bus services.

- As of March 2026, the London Buses fleet total of 8,982 buses includes 3,668 hybrid buses, 2,937 battery electric buses, and 20 hydrogen fuel cell buses.
- Route 18, running between Sudbury and Euston bus station is the busiest bus route. The service carried over 16.6 million passengers in 2018/19. The next busiest routes (over 10 million) are: 25, 29, 140, 149, 243, 207, 86, 36, 38, 5, 279, 53, 109, 141 and 43.
- Route U9 has the highest mean observed speed of daytime routes, at 18.8 mph. The slowest was 15H at 3.8 mph.
- Route SL7, running from Croydon to Heathrow Airport, is the longest daytime route at 24 miles (39 km). The next longest are routes 166, 358 and 465 (all 17 miles (27 km)), 111 and 246 (16 miles (26 km)) and 492 (15 miles (24 km)).

== Bibliography ==
- Marshall, Prince Wheels of London; The story of London's street transport. The Sunday Times Magazine, 1972. ISBN 0-7230-0068-9.
