= Bus conductor =

Person who sells and checks tickets on a bus

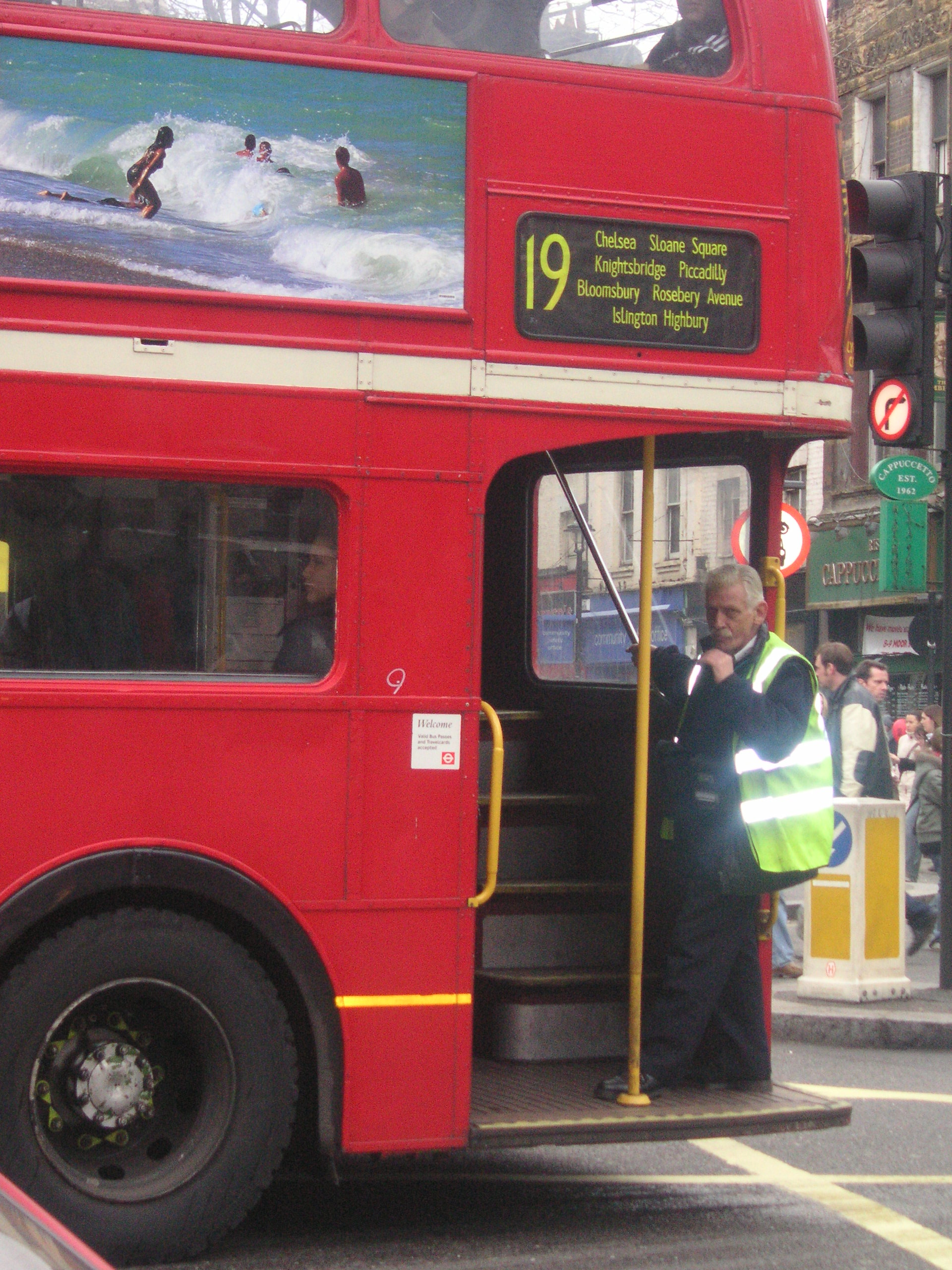
Traditional British open-platform AEC Routemaster bus in 2005, operated with a conductor

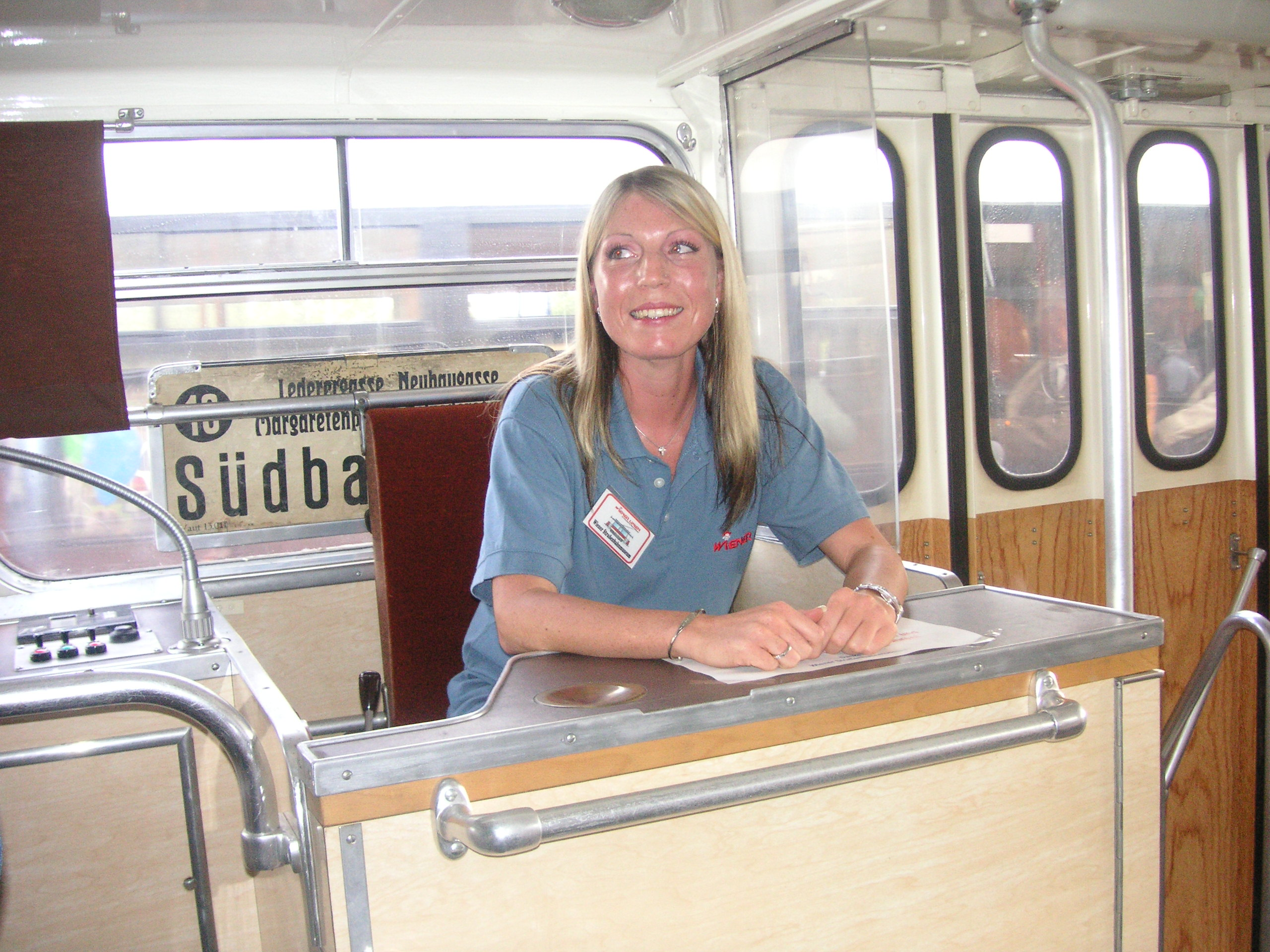
In the post-World War II decades, some countries introduced seated conductors. On this double-decker bus—which operated in Vienna, Austria from the early 1960s—passengers boarded at the rear, passed the conductor and exited through the middle or front doors.

A bus conductor (also referred to as a conductor or clippie) is a person (other than the driver) responsible for collecting fares from bus passengers and issues tickets to passengers. Bus conductors may also be responsible for helping passengers to board, keeping the bus route on schedule, attracting potential passengers to the vehicle, and announcing bus stops.

== History ==
In the late 1950s, new double-decker bus designs appeared in the United Kingdom that provided higher capacity, with the engine compartment at the rear and the entrance door by the driver. From July 1966, United Kingdom transport regulations were changed to allow the operation of urban double-deck buses by the driver only, who could now collect fares and supervise all passenger loading and unloading.

Some municipal operators adopted rear-engine bus designs and "one-person operation" quickly, others more slowly. More conservative municipal operators continued to order new half-cab buses through the 1960s, but this type of vehicle ceased production in the UK by about 1970. This was accelerated by a UK Government grant that supported purchasing "one person operated" vehicles, but was not available for purchasing traditional half-cab buses.

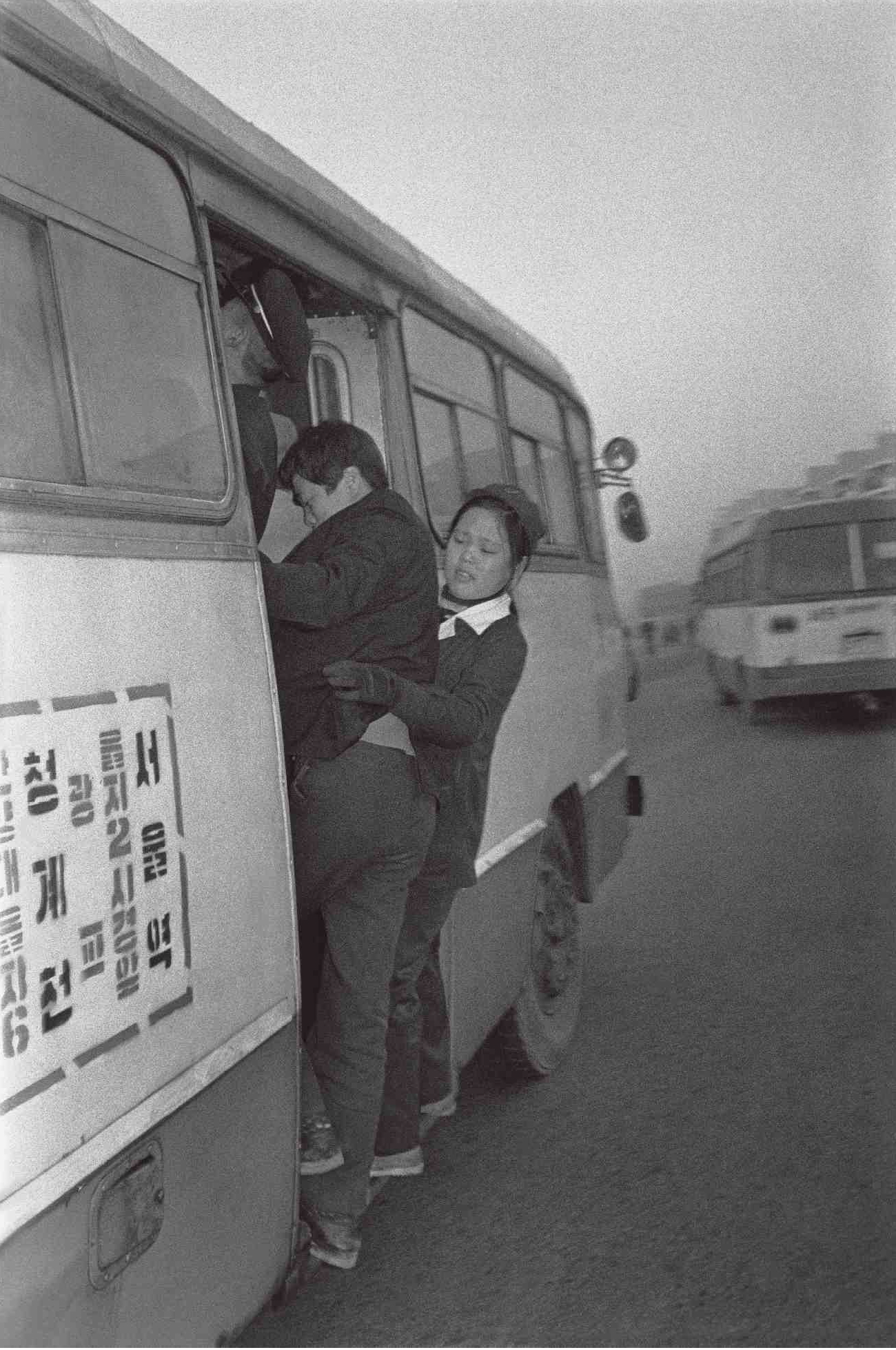
Bus conductor in Seoul, 1976

In the 1970s in South Korea, bus conductors worked up to 19 hours a day, from 5:00 a.m. to 11:30 p.m. and the Labor Standards Act was not followed, with hours worse than in the manufacturing industry.

Through the 1970s, the proportion of urban bus routes operated with conductors declined, as older vehicles were steadily replaced with new buses equipped for one-person operation, and operators grappled with staff shortages, rapidly increasing costs and falling usage. Kingston upon Hull City Transport, an early pioneer in one-person operation following the introduction of ten AEC Reliance single-deckers in May 1958, became the first municipal bus operator in Britain to phase out conductors on their services in November 1972. Many bus services now employ electronic fareboxes, proof-of-payment systems, transit passes and smart cards in lieu of bus conductors.

== Challenges ==
Conductors around the world, especially female, suffer from poor physical and mental health due to inactivity, poor working conditions, and long hours, threats of violence by passengers and in robberies, and harassment (especially towards female conductors).

== Modern usage ==
=== Africa ===
In Nigeria, conductors are known as "agbero". Most conductors are adult men, but homeless children are also known to work as bus conductors. In Mozambique, government-employed conductors are only responsible for collecting fares, but privately employed conductors assist passengers and attend to the mechanical needs of the bus.

Buses in Mauritius are operated with both a driver and a conductor. The bus conductor's job is mainly to collect money and hand out travel tickets to the passengers.

=== China ===
Bus conductors still exist on some articulated buses in Beijing, such as Routes 1, 2, 5, 300, and 347. These bus conductors do not sell tickets, and instead mostly supervise fare collection from on-boarding passengers.

=== Britain and Ireland ===
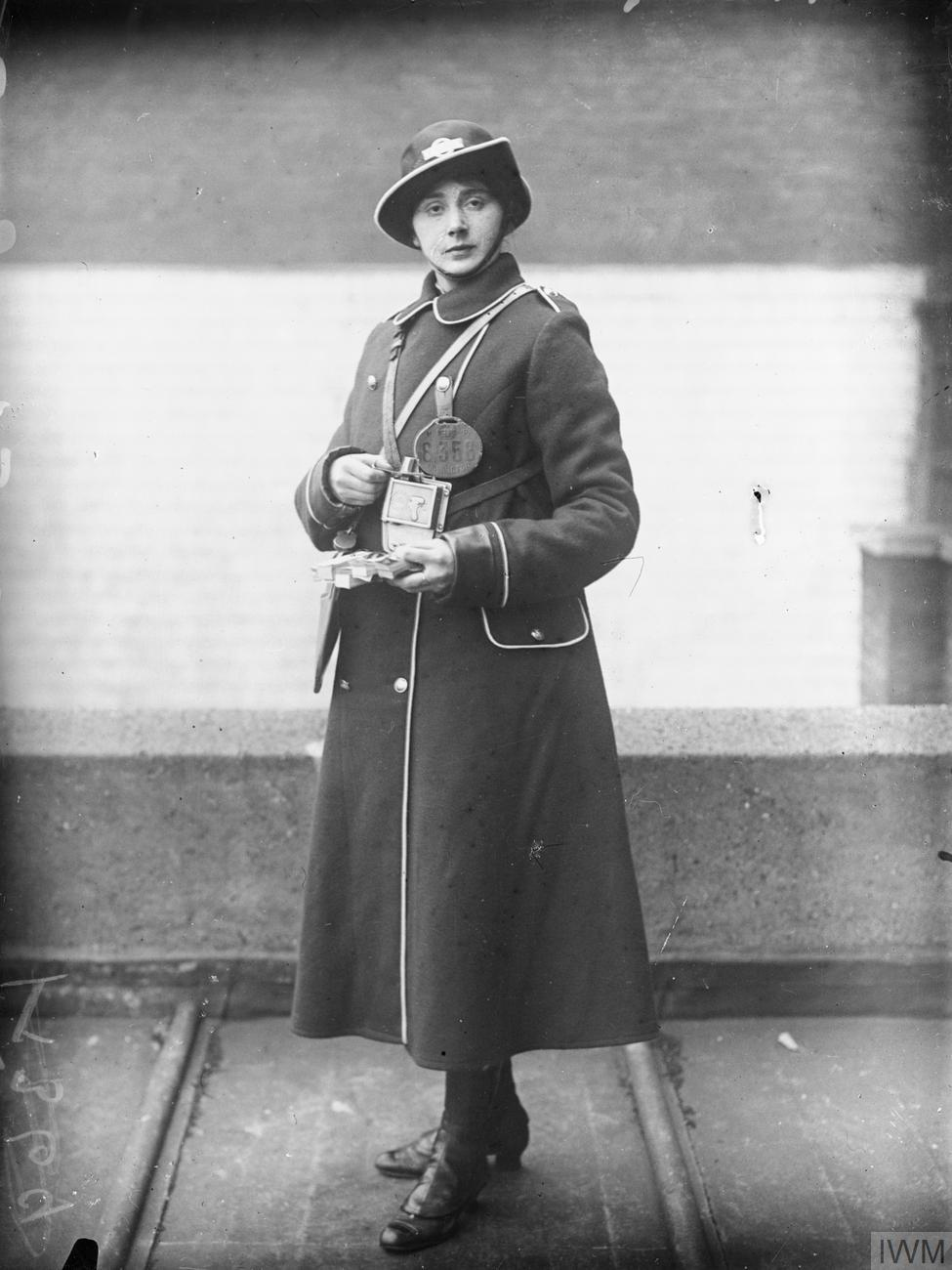
A bus conductor in uniform (1917)

Bus conductors were a common feature of many bus services across Europe until the late 1970s and early 1980s. The main reason two-person crews were needed was that most towns and cities used double-decker buses for urban services. Until the 1960s, all double deck vehicles were built with front-mounted engines and a "half-cab" design, such as the AEC Routemaster bus built for London Transport. This layout totally separated the driver from the passenger saloons. The conductor communicated with the driver using a series of bell codes, such as two bells to start (the "ding-ding").

Conductors were also employed on single-deck buses and coaches. In remote areas where these buses served such as in rural Ireland, conductors also had the responsibility of handling mail and passengers' luggage between stops. Some of these buses would therefore be built with dedicated parcel sections or roof racks for the stowage of such items.

Many half-cab double-deckers were boarded from an open platform at the rear, while others were equipped with a forward entrance and staircase and driver-operated doors. Each case required a conductor to collect fares and, especially on the rear-entrance design, supervise passenger loading and unloading. Some bus services in the late 1960s and early 1970s experimented with later-model forward entrance half-cab double-deckers—removing the conductor and having the driver sell tickets. The hope was to have the benefits of one-person operation without the cost of replacing vehicles that still had remaining service life. This idea was soon scrapped and the buses reverted to conventional conductor operation.

By the early 1980s, bus conductors were largely obsolete in all cities except London and Dublin. Two-person crews continued to operate a number of bus routes in central London until late 2005, well beyond their demise in the rest of the United Kingdom. This reprieve for conductors was due to London Transport and its 1984 successor London Regional Transport's continued use of the Routemaster bus on some of the busiest routes in the most congested parts of central London. The Routemaster remained favoured due to its robustness and manoeuvrability, fast passenger loading/unloading capability and fast fare collection performed by a conductor instead of a driver.

In Ireland, one-person operation was originally scheduled to commence on state-owned CIÉ's Dublin bus services in 1964. However, repeated protests from transport unions resulted in conductors being retained on all bus services through to the mid-1980s. The first one-person operated bus services in Dublin would commence 18 years later than planned on 9 March 1986 after CIÉ and the unions reached a settlement backed by the Labour Court in January 1986. CIÉ planned to convert three-quarters of its Dublin services to one-person operation within five years, however by 1987, workers at Clontarf bus garage would go on strike over the redeployment of 40 conductors from the garage. Conductors would be retained on Dublin Bus services as late as the mid-1990s, when the company introduced "autofare" one-person ticketing on services deemed to be at high risk for assaults on bus drivers and conductors.

In May 1987, following the start-up of Solent Blue Line, conductor buses returned to Southampton, where services were run in competition against Southampton Citybus on speeding up journey times, using second-hand Bristol VRTs. In retaliation, Southampton Citybus brought in ex-London Routemasters with a crew of conductors, these arrangements lasting until autumn 1989.

Though the majority of bus services in central London (and all routes outside the central area) have been operated by modern driver-only vehicles since the late 1980s, twenty regular routes retained Routemasters and their conductors. Between 2003 and 2005, all of these were progressively converted to low-floor modern vehicles and one-person operation. The process was largely driven by political views on disability accessibility and was encouraged, to some extent, by the increase in litigious passengers claiming injuries due to the Routemaster's open rear platform. There were also increasingly frequent robberies and attacks on conductors, who could find themselves working in an isolated and vulnerable environment. The last regular Routemaster-operated service was on route 159 from Marble Arch to Streatham. Conductor operation finally ceased on the 159 on 9 December 2005. However, heritage bus routes utilising the Routemaster were introduced that year, these numbered route 9H and 15H. Route 9H was withdrawn in 2014, whilst route 15H was withdrawn at the end of the 2019 season, after having been reduced to summer weekends only.

In the late 2000s and early 2010s, there was a revival in conductor operation on buses in the UK with the development of the FTR routes in York, Leeds and Swansea. As of 2020 however, these have all been withdrawn.

Conductors also returned to London in 2012 with the introduction of the New Routemaster. Some of the routes served by the New Routemaster did not have conductors, so the service were driver-only operated, in which the driver controlled the three doors of the bus. The role of the conductor was to ensure passengers validated their Oyster card as they board the bus and supervised passengers using the open platform. These have since all been removed and buses now run one-person operation with the open platform closed out of use.

Stagecoach Strathtay used conductors on Tayway service 73 from Arbroath, Carnoustie and Monifieth to Ninewells Hospital. In September 2020, however, Stagecoach announced their intention to withdraw their final conductors from this service resulting in 31 redundancies. The operator attributes this to the COVID-19 pandemic and its resultant drive towards contactless payment.

Quantock Motor Services in Somerset operates the service 400 'Exmoor Explorer' using crew-operated vintage open-top buses.

=== Japan ===
In post-war Japan, "bus girls" (basu gāru) was a term referring to female conductors. The position was sexualized and glamorized, but was often dangerous and involved poor working conditions.

=== South America ===
In Brazil, the importance of public transportation in everyday life makes conductors essential to facilitating a passenger's schedule. Robberies and the public humiliation of conductors through them are challenged faced in the profession.

In Uruguay, conductors are a product of British influence on the early public transportations systems of the 20th century. As part of the operation of urban and suburban buses in Montevideo and its metropolitan area, city-owned operator AMDET was the first to experiment with conductor-less micro-buses in the 1950s and COME S.A. since its inception in 1963 has operated without conductors. To avoid conflicts with unions it was stabilised that only buses with fewer than 24 seats could operate without conductors. In the following decades the predence of conductor-less buses increased until the 2000s when the adoption of electronic ticketing accelerated the redundance of the role. The authorities of Montevideo implemented a no-replacement system whereby conductors would remain operative until their individual retirement. Suburban buses became fully conductor-less by the late 2000s.

=== South Asia ===
In India, Pakistan, Bangladesh, Qatar, and Sri Lanka bus conductors are almost always present inside the buses throughout the journey. They issue tickets, usually pre-printed or using electronic ticketing machines, help in crowd management or act as assistants to the drivers. Indian government bus conductors may communicate with the driver via a bell, whistle, walkie talkies, or by shouting, "right!" (Aa right in south India). Private bus conductors use whistles or just shout to the driver. It is also common practice for conductors to clap their hand firmly on the outside of the bus as a signal to the driver that all passengers have boarded and the bus is good to go.

In India, the physical health of bus conductors is generally poor. Women began to enter the profession in India in 1980, although they were faced with threats of violence. Buses in specifically Kolkata are "staffed by two conductors...[who] operate at the front and rear doors of the bus."

Indian actor Rajinikanth began acting in plays while working in the Bangalore Transport Service as a bus conductor.
