= A. E. Bassom =

British police officer

Chief Constable A. E. Bassom OBE KPM
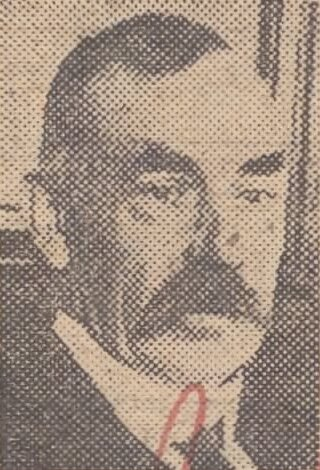
- Bassom in 1926

Director of Traffic Services, Metropolitan Police
- In office 1925 – 17 January 1926

Head of the Public Carriage Office, Metropolitan Police
- In office 1901–1925

Personal details
- Born: Arthur Ernest Bassom; 14 July 1865
- Died: 17 January 1926 (aged 60)
- Police career
- Allegiance: United Kingdom
- Branch: Metropolitan Police
- Service years: 1886–1926
- Rank: Constable (1886); Chief inspector (1901); Superintendent (1906); Chief constable (1925)

Arthur Ernest Bassom OBE KPM (14 June 1865 – 17 January 1926) was a British police officer and one of the main pioneers of traffic policing with the London Metropolitan Police.

Bassom joined the Royal Marine Artillery as a gunner at the age of 17 and gained the highest possible marks in his gunnery examinations and therefore almost certain promotion. However, in 1886, just before he reached 21, the minimum age at which he could be promoted, he left to join the Metropolitan Police as a constable. He was posted to "D" Division (Marylebone), and the following year was transferred to the Public Carriage Office at Scotland Yard, where he spent the rest of his career.

At the PCO his hard work, encyclopaedic memory and innate understanding of traffic problems led to rapid promotion. In 1901 he was promoted to chief inspector in charge of the branch. In 1903 he saw the introduction of London's first motor cab. After completing a course in motor engineering at the Regent Street Polytechnic, he produced the Metropolitan Police Regulations for the Construction and Licensing of Hackney (Motor) Carriages, 1906 (The Conditions of Fitness for Motor Hackney Carriages). This included the requirement for a 25-foot (7.6 m) turning circle, and influenced the design of London cabs for a century. In 1906 he was promoted to superintendent on merit.

It was said that he could visualise any part of the 700 square miles of the Metropolitan Police District and give an analysis of its traffic problems and possible solutions. Commissioner Sir Nevil Macready admitted that Bassom was the one man in the Metropolitan Police who was indispensable, so much so that when he reached the retirement age of 60 for officers below chief officer rank in 1925 he was promoted to chief constable and given the title of Director of Traffic Services in order to retain him. He died in 1926, still in office.

He had a detailed knowledge of motor mechanics. He visited nearly every town in the United Kingdom and many in Europe to observe their traffic problems. He framed "the Knowledge", the test undertaken by all London taxi drivers, and devised the Bassom System of London bus route numbers, some of which still survive in London today; the 13 and 113; the 15 and 115; the 36 and 136; and the 68 and 168.

He was awarded the King's Police Medal (KPM) in 1919 and appointed Officer of the Order of the British Empire (OBE) in the 1920 civilian war honours.
