= London Buses route 15 (Heritage) =

Former London heritage bus route

15H
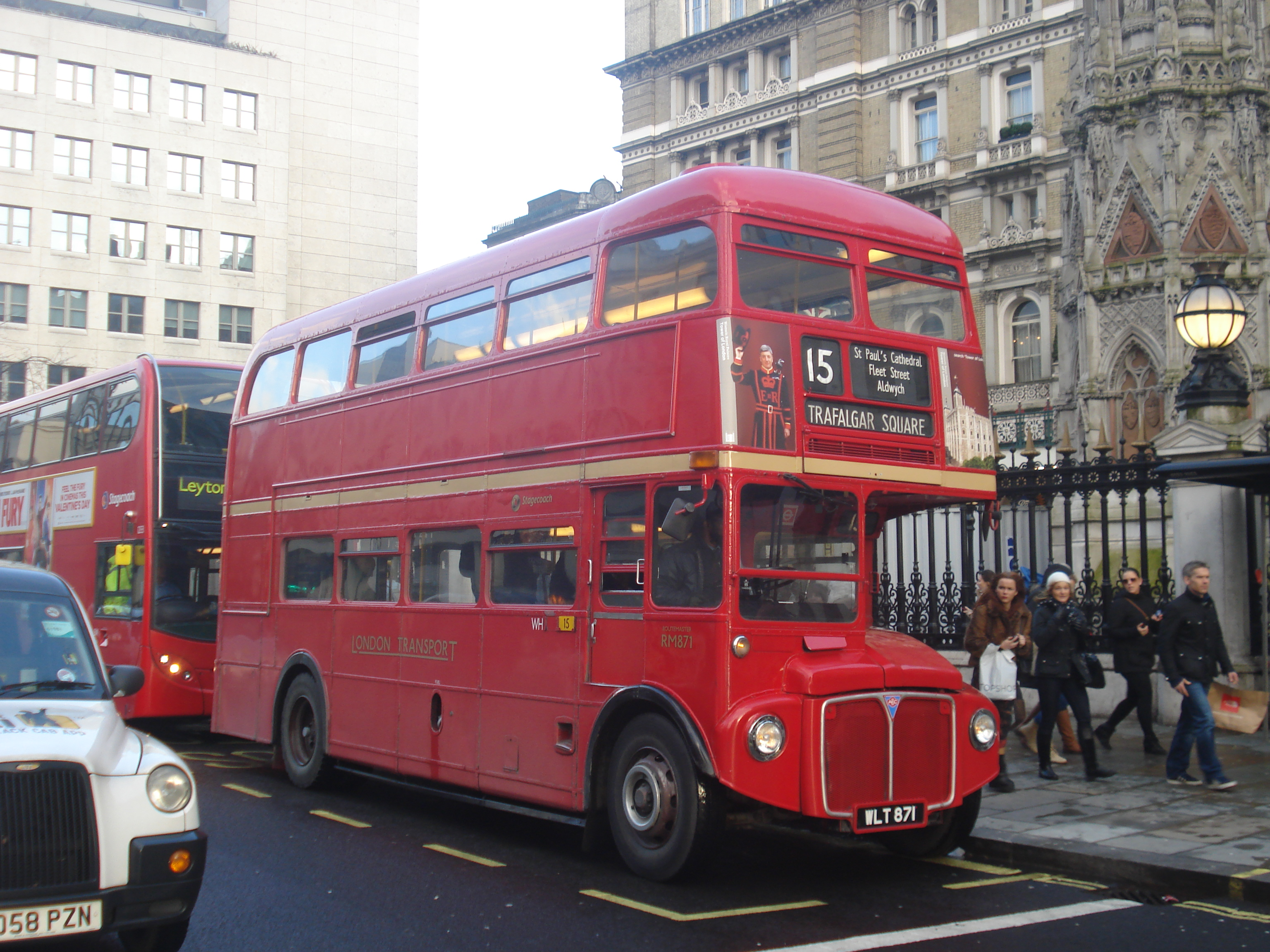
- East London AEC Routemaster in February 2014

Overview
- Operator: East London (Stagecoach London)
- Garage: West Ham
- Vehicle: AEC Routemaster
- Peak vehicle requirement: 5
- Status: Defunct
- Began service: 14 November 2005
- Ended service: 14 November 2020
- Night-time: N15

Route
- Start: Tower Hill station
- Via: Cannon Street; Aldwych
- End: Charing Cross station
- Length: 3 miles (4.8 km)

Service
- Level: Weekends and public holidays Late March to Late September only
- Frequency: About every 20 minutes
- Journey time: 24-25 minutes
- Operates: 09:30 until 19:00

London Buses route 15H was a Transport for London contracted bus route in London, England. It ran between Tower Hill and Charing Cross stations, and was operated by Stagecoach London subsidiary East London.

It was a short working of the standard route 15 and was the last route operated with preserved AEC Routemasters.

== History ==
This route and route 9H were announced initially as 'A' and 'B' as short workings on existing routes to avoid any potential complications as Government's legislation requires buses to be fully wheelchair-accessible by 22 October 2014 in the entire United Kingdom. For Transport for London, they aimed to comply earlier with the last non-wheelchair accessible buses withdrawn in June 2008 with two exemptions - the heritage routes. Route 9H was withdrawn in 2014.

One of the two routes, awarded to East London, was for services between Trafalgar Square and Tower Hill, covering the most touristy section of route 15 taking in the Tower of London, Monument, St Paul's Cathedral and Trafalgar Square. An extension to the Oxford Street area was excluded due to severe congestion there. The number of the parallel route 15 was adopted for the AEC Routemasters, despite potential for confusion with the main 15.

Ten buses were allocated to the operator; 5 for the daily turnout, 3 operational spares and 2 as a "strategic reserve". Despite having only a couple of weeks to prepare the vehicles after they left normal service, East London turned out 5 immaculately presented Routemasters for the first day of service, 14 November 2005. The first journey was driven by Peter Hendy, managing director of TfL surface transport.

In April 2008, one of the buses was painted in a special Indian Red and Silver livery, to promote Bow Garage's Centenary. It was first revealed at the London Bus Preservation Trust's Cobham bus rally, and soon after entered regular service.

The buses operated with conductors collecting fares, in cash (until July 2014, when they went cashless along with the rest of the London bus network) or by Oyster card. Travelcards and Bus and Tram passes were also accepted, but contactless payment cards were not.

In 2015, it was announced that ten Routemasters were to be refurbished which included opening windows being refitted. In November of the same year, the frequency of the service was reduced from a bus every 15 minutes to a bus every 20 minutes in an attempt to improve the reliability of the service.

From 2 March 2019, the heritage service was reduced to operate only on weekends and bank holidays, from the last (2019: first) Saturday in March until the last weekend in September.

The route did not operate during 2020 as a result of the COVID-19 pandemic and its contract expired in November of that year and was not renewed. In 2021, Transport for London confirmed that the route would not run again, thus being withdrawn at the end of its contract on 14 November 2020.

In October 2023, new heritage route T15 started operating daily from Tower Gateway to Charing Cross and on across the river to Waterloo, by Transpora Group. However, this route is operated privately and is not connected to Transport for London.

== Former route ==
Route 15H operated via these primary locations:

- Tower Hill station
- Monument station
- Cannon Street station
- Mansion House station
- St Paul's Cathedral
- City Thameslink station
- Aldwych
- The Strand
- Charing Cross station

== See also ==
- List of bus routes in London
- London Buses route 9H - the second heritage service that operated from 2005 until 2014
