= London Buses route 9 (Heritage) =

Former London heritage bus route

9H
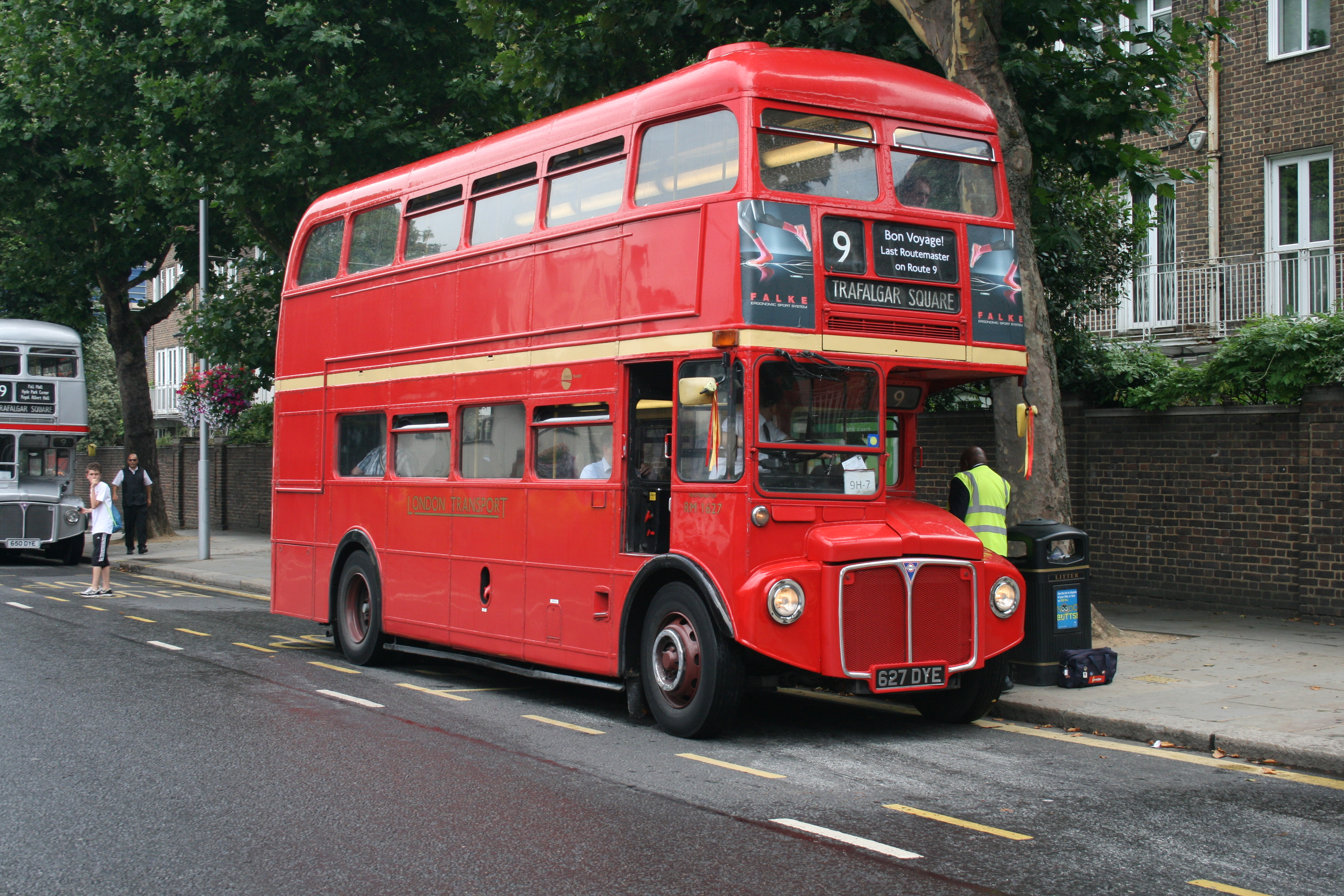
- Tower Transit AEC Routemaster on Holland Road in July 2014

Overview
- Operator: Tower Transit
- Garage: Westbourne Park
- Vehicle: AEC Routemaster
- Peak vehicle requirement: 5
- Status: Defunct
- Began service: 14 November 2005
- Ended service: 25 July 2014
- Night-time: No night service

Route
- Start: Kensington High Street
- Via: Royal Albert Hall; Knightsbridge; Hyde Park Corner; Pall Mall
- End: Trafalgar Square
- Annual patronage: 423,299 (2013–14)

London Buses route 9H was a Transport for London contracted bus route in London, England. It ran between Kensington High Street and Trafalgar Square, and was last operated by Tower Transit.

== History ==
To counter unfavourable media coverage of the withdrawal of London's classic AEC Routemaster fleet, Mayor of London Ken Livingstone promised to introduce a heritage Routemaster operation. After hopes that this would be operated commercially, it eventually materialised as tendered short workings on two existing routes, 9H and 15H. The route was initially operated by First London from Aldwych to the Royal Albert Hall, duplicating the eastern half of route 9. The route was criticised by the Liberal Democrats for missing out important tourist attractions such as Buckingham Palace, Big Ben and the British Museum.

This approach ensured passengers with other mobility problems would have alternatives to the Routemasters. The two heritage routes began operation on 14 November 2005. The Routemasters selected had been rebuilt in the early 2000s by Marshall Bus with new engines, windows and lighting.

On 13 November 2010, route 9H was extended westward from the Royal Albert Hall to Kensington High Street and curtailed at its eastern end to Trafalgar Square. The extension was at the urging of the Royal Borough of Kensington and Chelsea, which wanted to boost the number of visitors to Kensington High Street.

On 22 June 2013, route 9H was included in the sale of First London's Westbourne Park garage to Tower Transit. Route 9H ceased operating on 25 July 2014 because the arrival of New Routemasters on route 9 reduced the patronage of route 9H. Peter Bradley, head of the route 9H consultation, said: "We are considering the removal of this service because it costs more than £1m a year to operate, owing in large part to the upkeep of the 60-year-old buses, and a low level of use by passengers. This money will be re-invested in London’s bus network".

== Former route ==
Route 9H operated via these primary locations:

- Kensington High Street Holland Road
- High Street Kensington station
- Royal Albert Hall
- Knightsbridge station
- Hyde Park Corner station
- Green Park station
- Pall Mall
- Trafalgar Square

== See also ==
- List of bus routes in London
- London Buses route 15H - the second heritage service that operated from 2005 until 2019
