= Great Horkesley =

Village in Essex, England

Coordinates: 51.929°N 0.87852°E

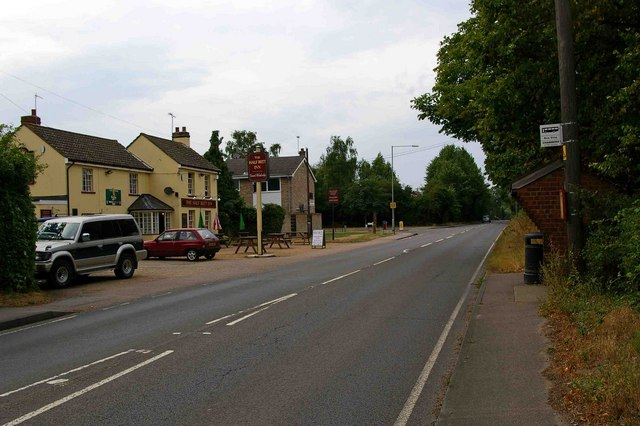
- The A134 road, Great Horkesley

- Location within Essex
- Population: 2,697 (Parish, 2021)
- District: City of Colchester
- Shire county: Essex
- Region: East
- Country: England
- Sovereign state: United Kingdom
- Post town: Colchester
- Postcode district: CO6
- Dialling code: 01206
- Police: Essex
- Fire: Essex
- Ambulance: East of England
- UK Parliament: Harwich and North Essex

Great Horkesley is a village and civil parish in the City of Colchester district of Essex, England, approximately 3 miles north of Colchester. At the 2021 census the parish had a population of 2,697.

Horkesley is located in what is known as "Horkesley Heath", which is a combination of two villages: Great Horkesley and, to the north, Little Horkesley which is an entirely different Parish. Horkesley is a modern name for the original Saxon name of "Horkaslay" which means "farm land for herds" (mainly sheep) though now it has many fields growing a variety of crops from corn to hemp. A few years ago an archaeological dig was made in woods on Coach Road, where a Bronze Age bronze smelting pit was found. Much Of Great Horkesley was a marsh, with very boggy ground, until it was drained by farmers. This is the reason why the main road is called "The Causeway" as it was a firm, and safe route of passage.

Development in the north of Colchester threatens to encroach on Great Horkesley. Housing targets set by the East of England Regional Assembly have led Colchester Borough Council to plan more than 2,200 new homes on the remaining green space between town and village along the A134 by 2021.

The Church of England has 2 churches in the parish.

There is a thriving Residents Association in the parish.

Great Horkesley Cricket Club was reformed in 1975 and played its home matches at The Chantry at the northern end of the village. Its origins can be traced back to at least 1861 when they were bowled out for 6 in the first innings against Layer Breton CC - home games then were played at Horkesley Park. Due to uncertainty over development plans for the area, the club has temporarily moved its games to Mile End Playing Fields just a short distance from the village. In 2014, Great Horkesley Cricket Club and Lexden Cricket Club merged to form a new club called Great Horkesley & Lexden Cricket Club and will have two teams playing in Division Two and Five of the North Essex Cricket League. They will play first team games at Mile End, and second team games at Spring Lane, Lexden.

The village has good bus links into Colchester, with services every 30 minutes from both Arriva Colchester’s route 2 and First Essex’s route 87.

== Transport ==
Bus Service	Operator	Route	Notes
2	Arriva Colchester	Horkesley Heath - Colchester North - Town Centre - Highwoods	Mon to Sat (every 30 minutes)
2A	First Essex	Highwoods - Colchester North - Horkesley Heath	Sundays and Mon to Sat Evenings only (every 60 minutes)
84	Hedingham & Chambers	Sudbury - Horkesley Heath - Colchester North - Colchester Bus Station	Mon to Sat (Irregular)
87	First Essex	Horkesley Heath - Colchester North - University of Essex - Wivenhoe - Brightlingsea	Mon to Sat (every 30 minutes), Sundays (every 60 minutes)
