= Essex Airlink =

Three airport bus routes in Essex, England

Essex Airlink: X10, X20 & X30

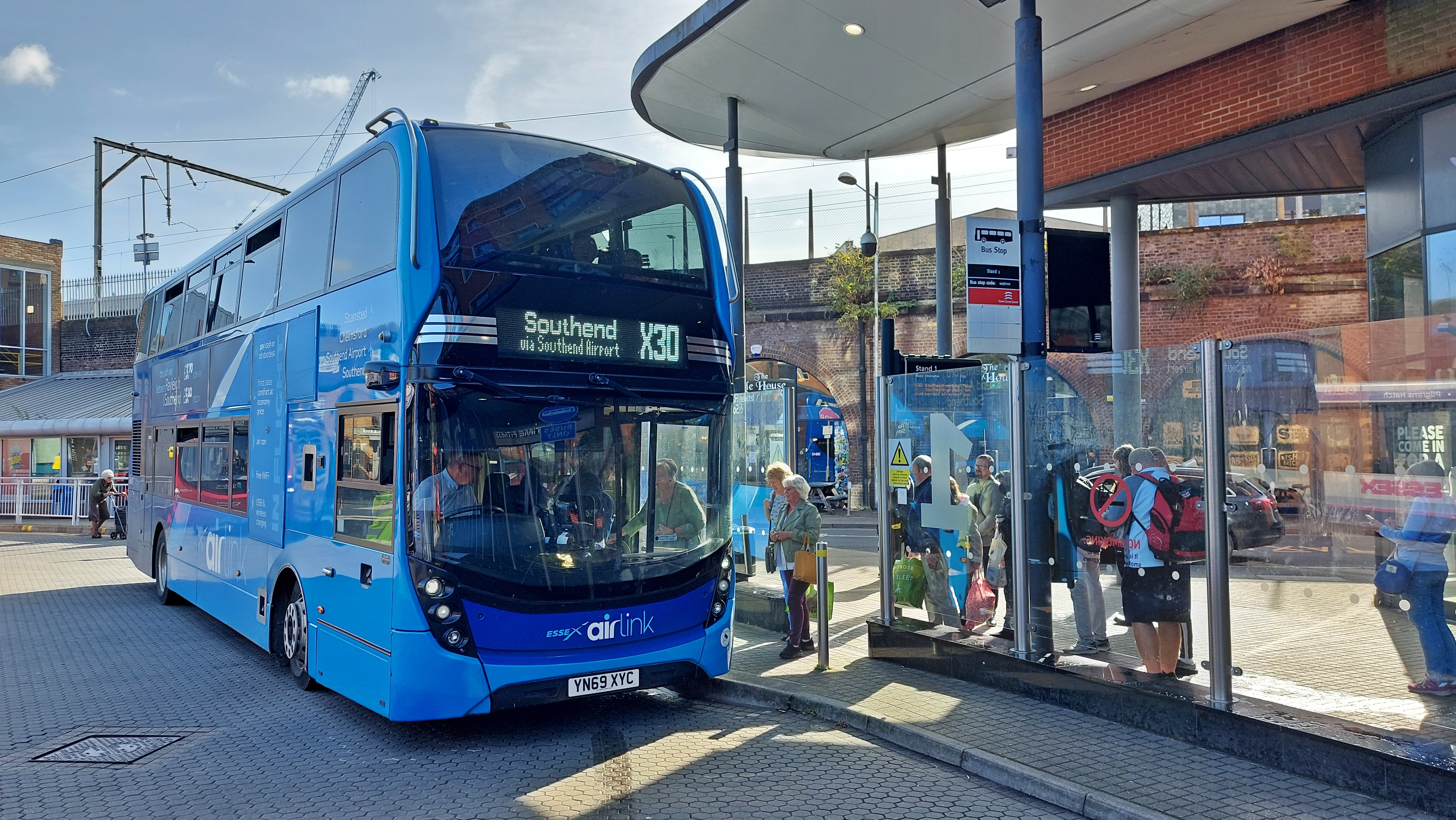
- A First Essex Airlink X30 bus at Chelmsford bus station (2023)

Overview
- Operator: First Essex
- Garage: Basildon: X10; Colchester: X20; Chelmsford: X30
- Vehicles: Scania N250UD; Alexander Dennis Enviro400 MMC; Alexander Dennis Enviro200 MMC
- Peak vehicle requirement: 4 (X10, X20); 8 (X30)

Route
- Start: X10: Basildon; X20: Colchester; X30: Southend-on-Sea
- Via: X10: Wickford and Chelmsford; X20: Braintree; X30: Southend Airport, Rayleigh and Chelmsford
- End: All: Stansted Airport

Service
- Level: Daily: 364 days/year (not 25 Dec)
- Frequency: Hourly: 22 hours/day
- Journey time: 75–80 min from Basildon; >90 min from Southend; 35–40 min from Chelmsford; >100 min from Colchester

Essex Airlink is the brand given to three airport bus routes operated by First Essex; it was relaunched at Stansted Airport, in Essex, England, on 17 February 2020. There are three routes, X10, X20 and X30, which start their journeys in Basildon bus station, Colchester High Street and Southend Travel Centre respectively.

== Overview of routes ==
Heading northbound, the X10 and X30 routes meet on the A130 and then follow the same route to Chelmsford. From there, the route then splits:

- Daytime X10 and alternate X30 services take a route via Broomfield Hospital and Great Dunmow
- Most evening and all night-time X10 journeys take a more direct route, along with all night-time X30 services.

The X20 takes the A120 from Colchester to Stansted.

== X10 ==
This route began operation in July 2016 using Volvo 7900 Hybrids, redeployed temporarily from First Essex's 100 route. It is currently operated by five Alexander Dennis Enviro200 MMCs that were launched in November 2016, along with another seven for the X30. Route X10 buses used to carry From Here to Air branding. Two buses have since been repainted into the new Essex Airlink livery with branding for the X10 destinations.

Basildon and Wickford previously had a service to Stansted Airport, the X40. The service began in May 2009, but was withdrawn in February 2010 due to low usage.

== X20 ==
Launched in July 2023, this route operates hourly throughout the week.

== X30 ==
This route is both busier and longer than the X10. Until the introduction of the new Alexander Dennis Enviro400 MMC-bodied Scania N250UD double-decker buses in February 2020, journeys were frequently overcrowded with passengers having to stand for part or the whole of their journeys. To help with the overcrowding, First introduced two Wright Eclipse Gemini 2-bodied Volvo B9TL buses in 2018; these were used on certain journeys alongside the Alexander Dennis Enviro200 MMC buses that were delivered in 2016 in X30 From Pier to Air branding.

The new buses introduced in February 2020 feature leather seats, free wi-fi, USB and wireless charging, table and solo seating, luggage racks, and next-stop audio and visual announcements. Along with the Alexander Dennis Enviro200 MMCs used on the Chelmsford Park and Ride, they feature next-stop audio visual announcements. The luggage rack is monitored by CCTV, which is shown on display on the top deck so that the passengers can still see their luggage from the top deck.

During the COVID-19 pandemic, the X30 was diverted along Broomfield Road during the daytime to serve Broomfield Hospital; this route is still used today for many journeys.

From 10 October 2022, the frequency of the section between Southend and Rayleigh was increased from hourly to half-hourly. From June 2024, the half-hourly service was extended across the entire route.
