= London Stansted Airport =

International airport in Essex, England

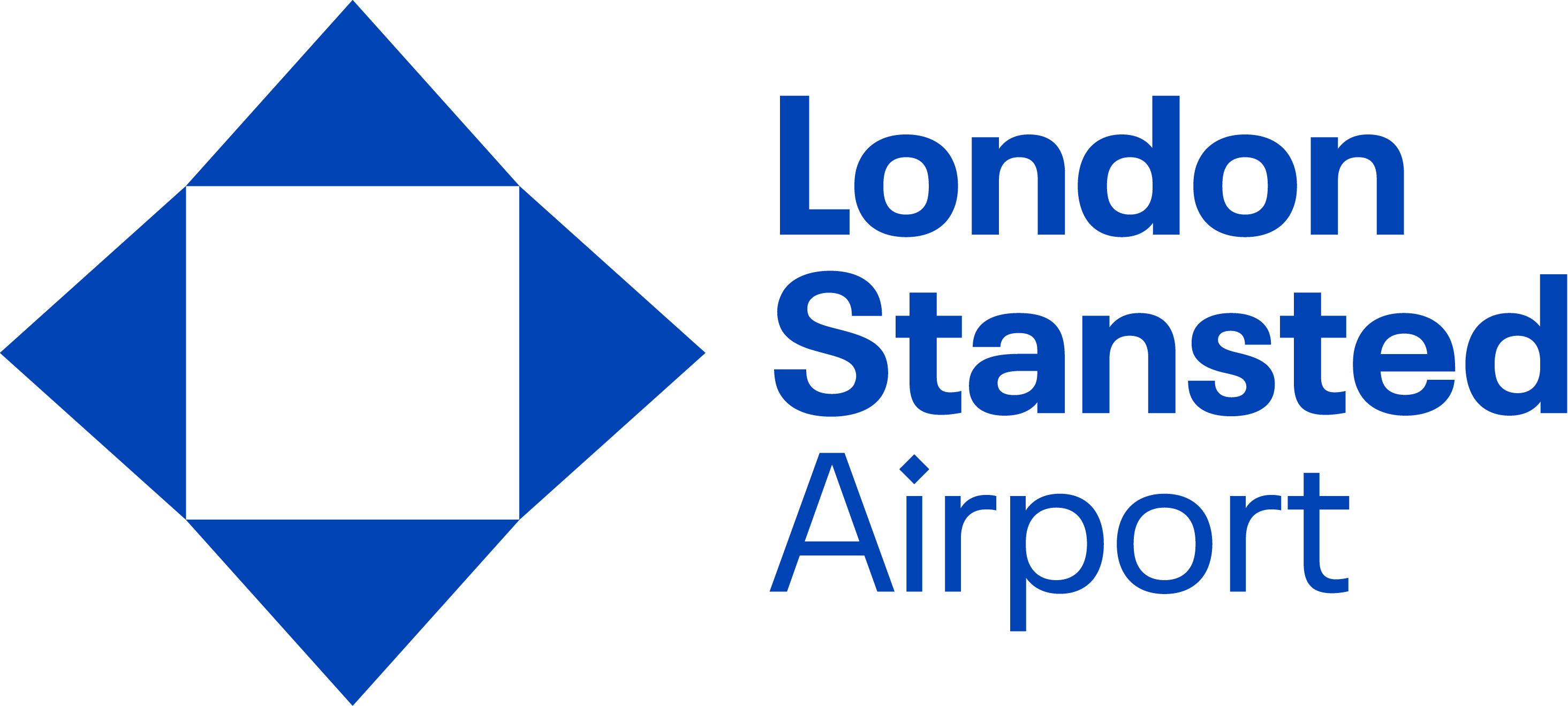

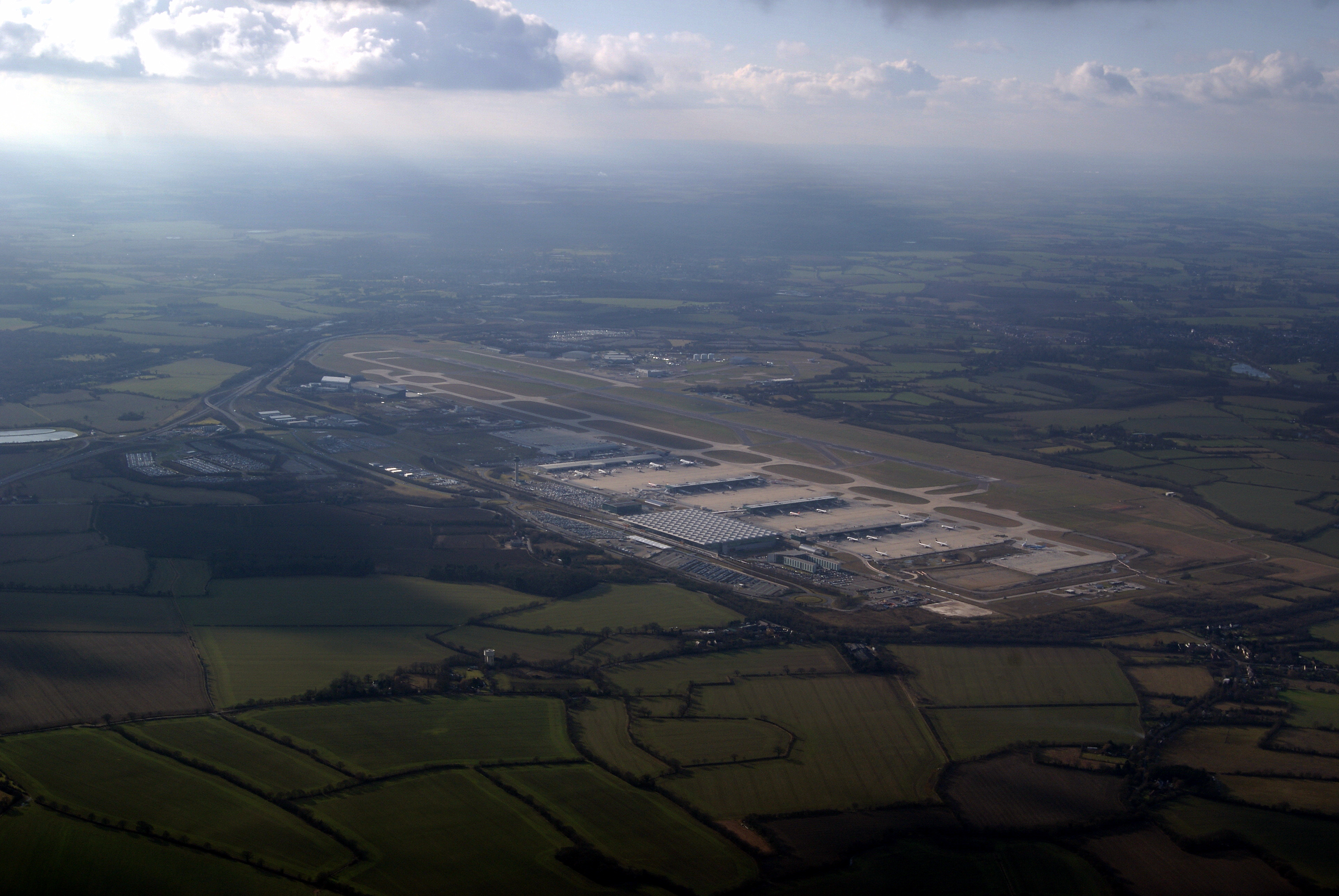
- IATA: STN; ICAO: EGSS; WMO: 03683

Summary
- Airport type: Public
- Owner/Operator: Manchester Airports Group
- Serves: London
- Location: Stansted Mountfitchet, Uttlesford, Essex, England
- Opened: 7 August 1943; 83 years ago
- Operating base for: Jet2.com; Ryanair; TUI Airways
- Elevation AMSL: 348 ft (106 m)
- Coordinates: 51°53′06″N 0°14′06″E
- Website: stanstedairport.com

Map
- Location in Essex STN/EGSS (England) STN/EGSS (the United Kingdom)

Runways
Direction	Length		Surface
Direction	m	ft	Surface
04/22	3,049	10,003	Grooved Asphalt

Statistics (2024)
- Passengers: 29,760,000
- Passenger change 23-24: ▲5.9%
- Aircraft movements: 179,135
- Movements change 22-23: ▲12%
- Sources: UK AIP at NATS; Statistics from the UK Civil Aviation Authority

London Stansted Airport (IATA: STN, ICAO: EGSS) is an international airport serving London and the south-east of England. It is located near Stansted Mountfitchet, in the district of Uttlesford, Essex; it lies 31 miles (50 km; 27 nmi) north-east of Central London.

As London's third-busiest airport, Stansted serves over 180 destinations across Europe, Asia and North Africa. London Stansted is a base for a number of European low-cost carriers; this includes being the largest base for low-cost airline Ryanair, with over 150 destinations served by the airline. As of 2022, it is the fourth-busiest airport in the United Kingdom, after Heathrow, Gatwick and Manchester. During the COVID-19 pandemic in 2021, it ranked second in the country. Stansted's runway is also used by private companies, such as the Harrods Aviation, Titan Airways and XJet terminals, which are private ground handlers that can handle private flights, charter flights and state visits.

Converted to civil use from RAF Stansted Mountfitchet in the late 1940s, Stansted was used by charter airlines. It came under British Airports Authority control in 1966. The privatised BAA sold Stansted in February 2013 to Manchester Airports Group as a result of a March 2009 ruling by the Competition Commission against BAA's monopoly position.

The airport has one main passenger terminal, which opened in 1991, with three passenger satellites containing the departure gates. The terminal building was designed by Foster and Partners and is regarded as influential for airport architecture.

From 1997 to 2007, Stansted had rapid expansion of passenger numbers on the back of the boom in low-cost air travel, peaking at 24 million passengers in the 12 months to October 2007, but passenger numbers declined in the next five years. Passenger totals later increased and it recorded an annual increase of 8.0% to 24.3 million in 2016; numbers have since continued to rise.

== History ==
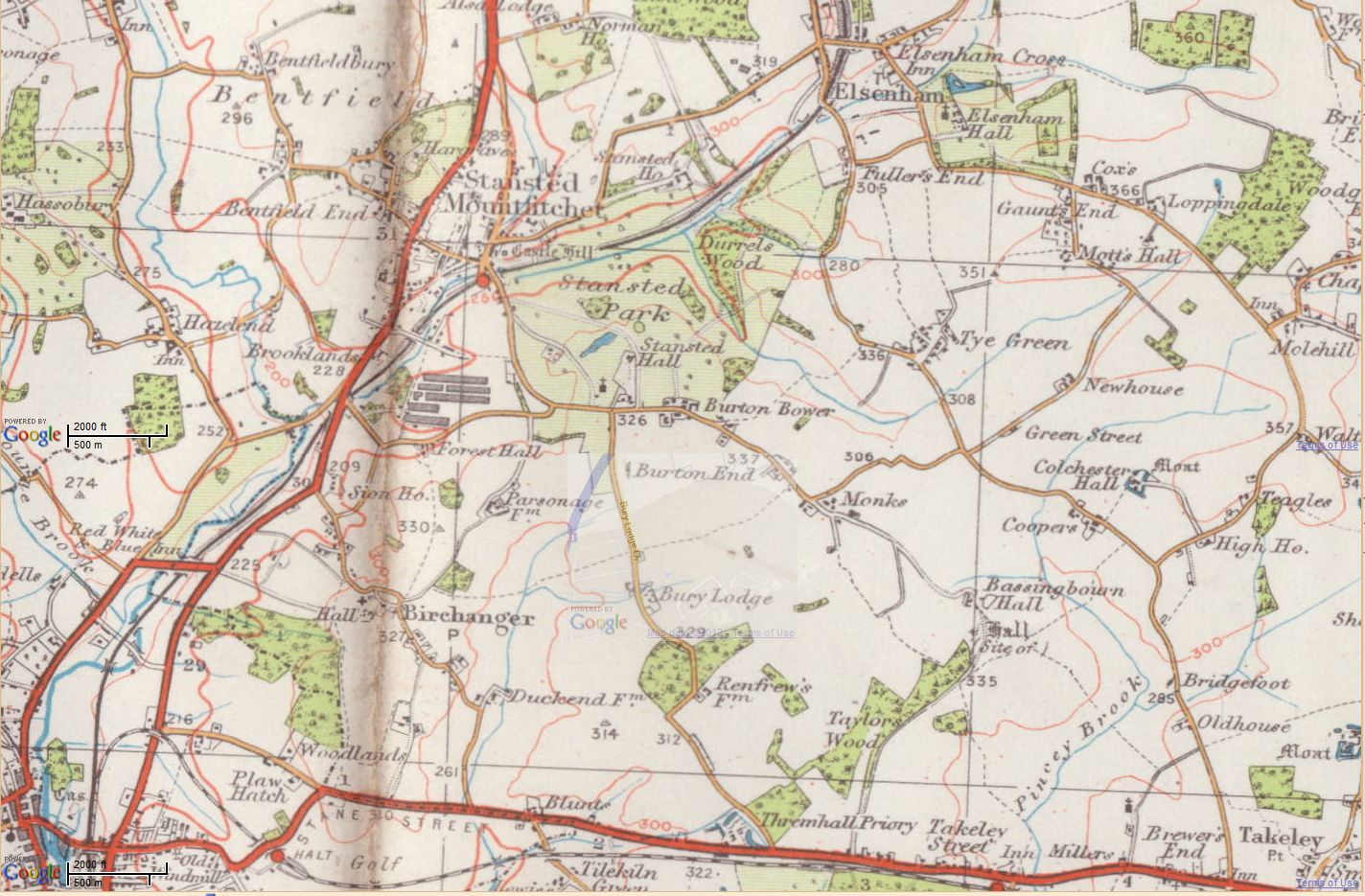
Area of Stansted Airport, c. 1935

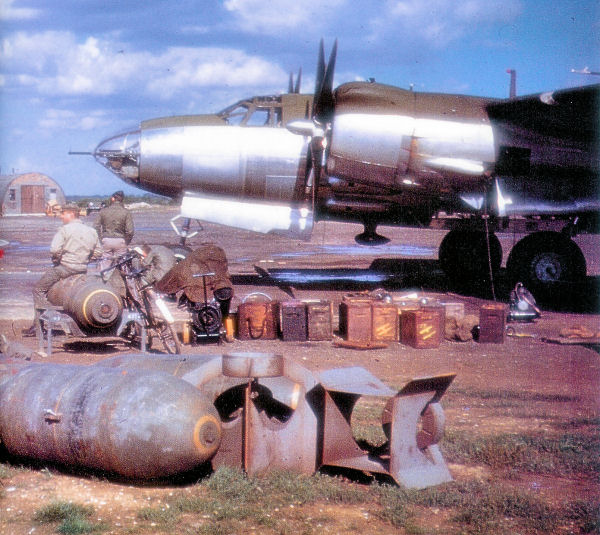
A Martin B-26 Marauder of the 344th Bomb Group at Stansted, 1944

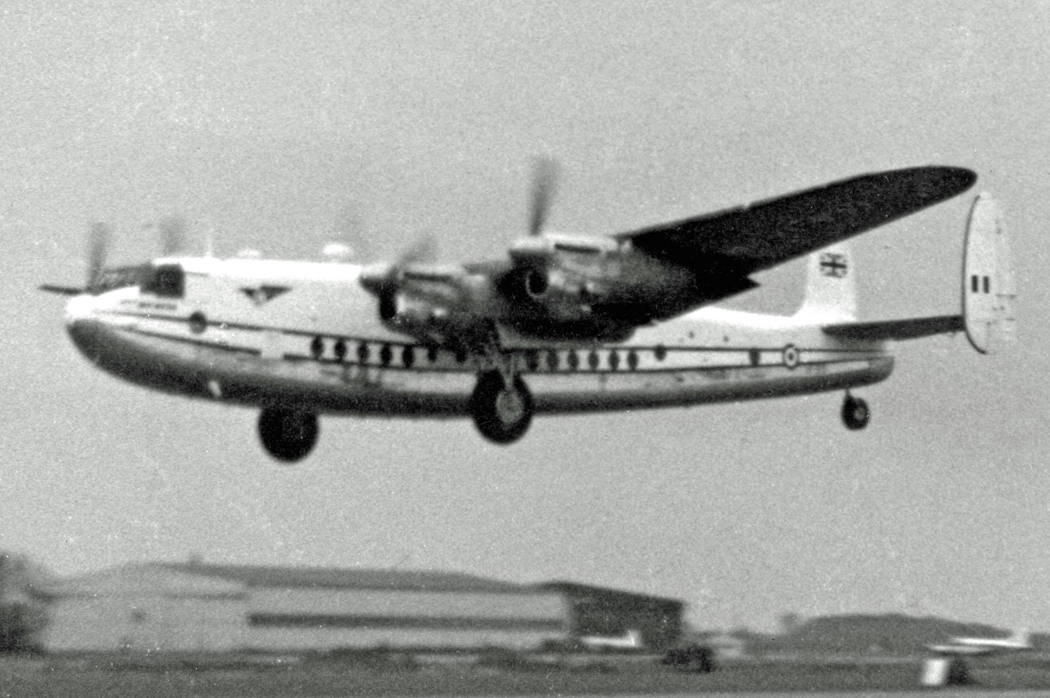
Avro York of the based Air Charter Ltd taking off on a trooping flight in 1955 with wartime hangars in the background

=== Second World War ===
The airfield opened in early July 1943 with a dedication ceremony for the Stansted Airfield with a parade of builders, the 825th Engineer Aviation Battalion EAB and the 850th Engineer Aviation Battalion EAB of the United States Army, along with a small group of the British Royal Engineers who offered to help and wanted to learn how to operate the heavy construction equipment. Stansted Mountfitchet Airport was used during the Second World War as RAF Stansted Mountfitchet by the Royal Air Force and the United States Army Air Forces as a bomber airfield and as a major maintenance depot. Although the official name was Stansted Mountfitchet, the base was known as simply Stansted in both written and spoken form.

The station was first allocated to the USAAF Eighth Air Force in August 1942 as a heavy-bomber airfield. As well as an operational bomber base, Stansted was also an Air Technical Services Command maintenance and supply depot concerned with major overhauls and modification of B-26s. After D-Day, these activities were transferred to France, but the base was still used as a supply storage area for the support of aircraft on the continent.

=== Postwar use ===
After the withdrawal of the Americans on 12 August 1945, Stansted was taken over by the Air Ministry and used by No. 263 Maintenance Unit, RAF, for storage purposes. In addition, between March 1946 and August 1947, Stansted was used for housing German prisoners of war.

In November 1946, the recently established British cargo airline, London Aero and Motor Services, equipped with ex-RAF Handley Page Halifaxes, moved into Stansted, using it as a base for its operations until it was wound up in July 1948.

The Ministry of Civil Aviation finally took control of Stansted in 1949 and the airport was then used as a base by several UK charter airlines. The US military returned in 1954 to extend the runway for a possible transfer to NATO. The transfer to NATO was never realised, however, and the airport continued in civil use, ending up under BAA control in 1966.

During the 1960s, '70s, and early '80s, the Fire Service Training School was based on the eastern side of the airfield under the auspices of the Ministry of Transport and Civil Aviation, now the Civil Aviation Authority. The school was responsible for the training of all aviation fire crews for British airfields, as well as those of many overseas countries.

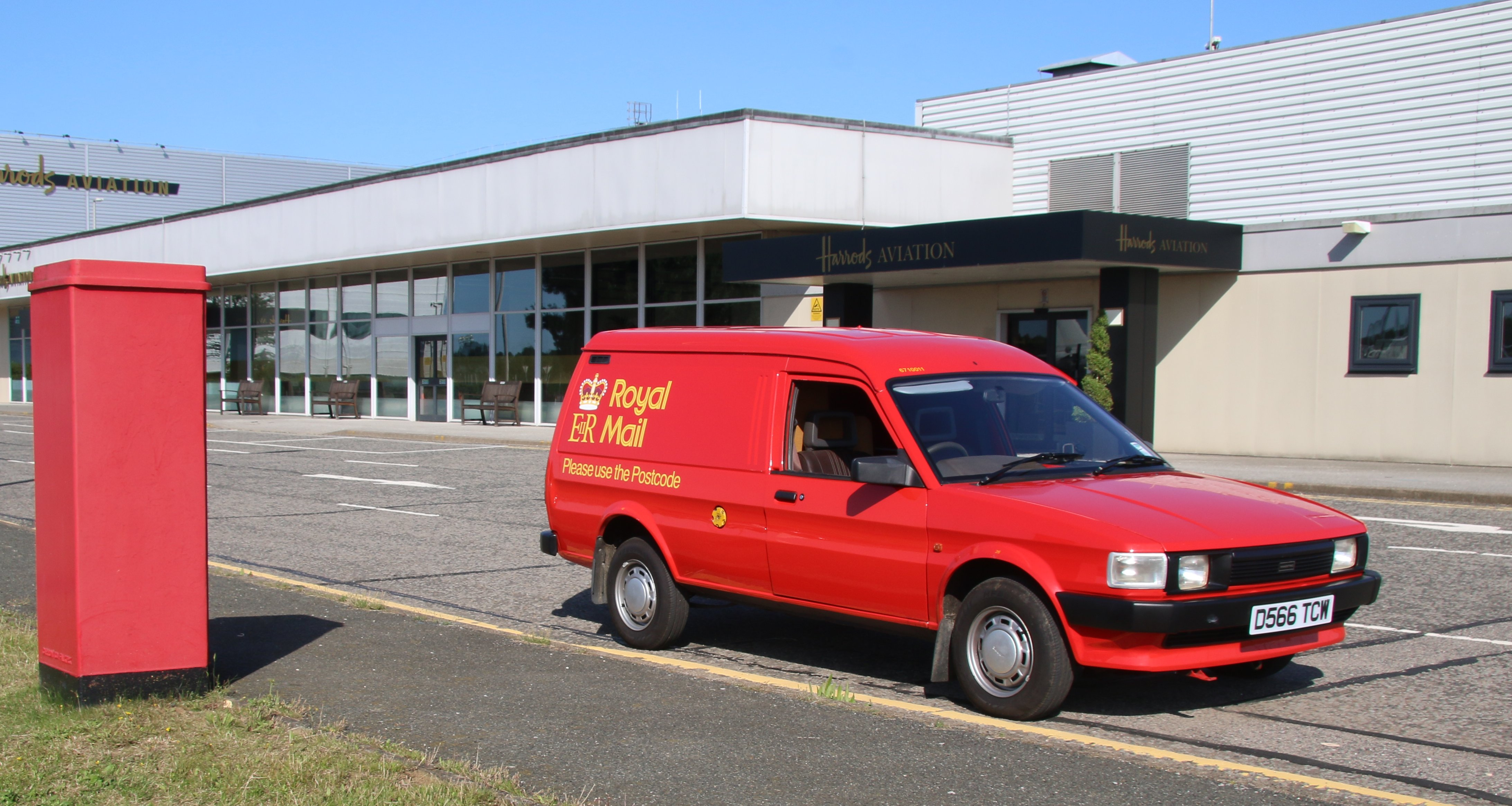
The pre-1991 terminal

=== Under BAA ownership (1966–2013) ===
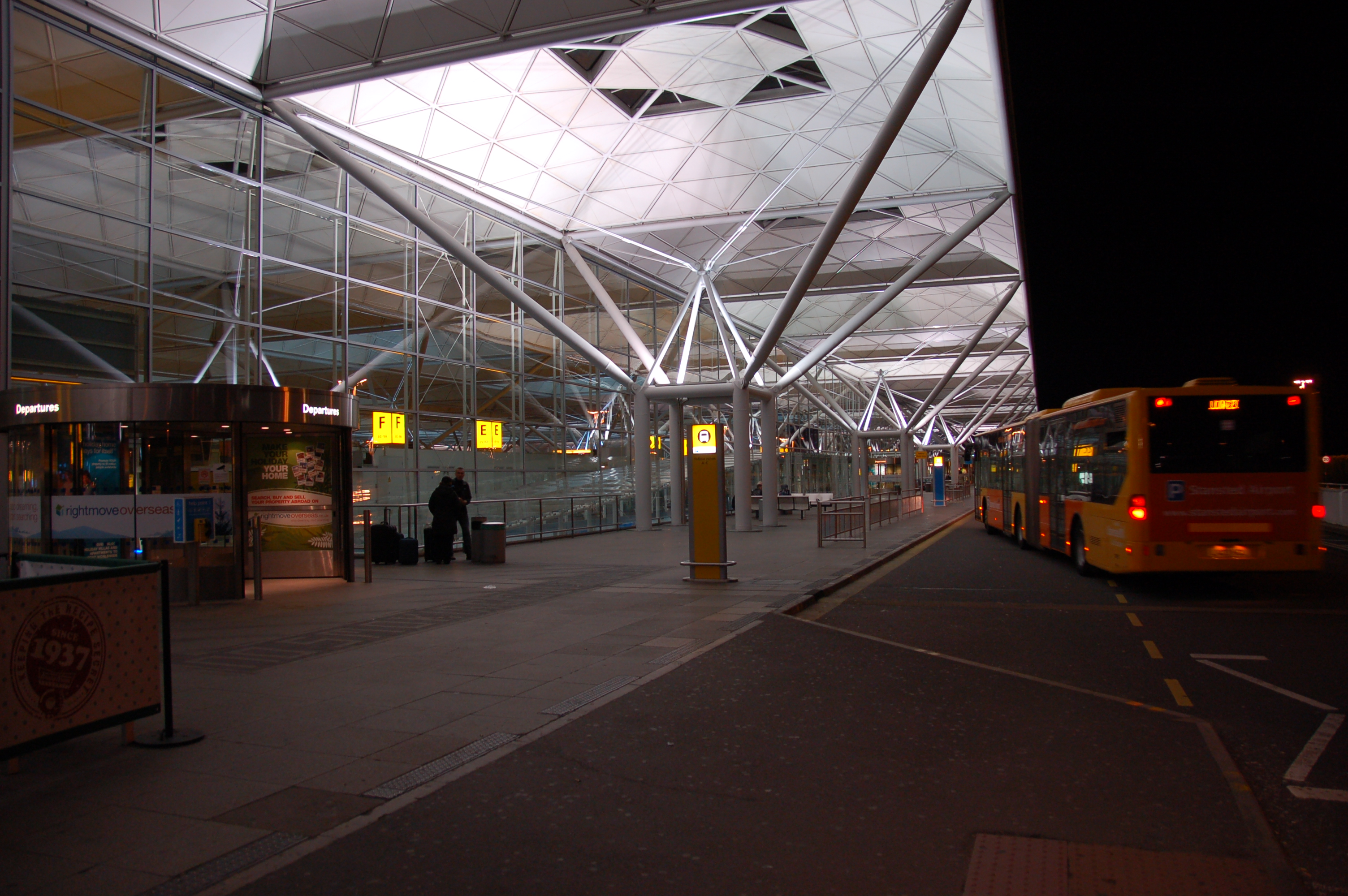
The terminal building at night

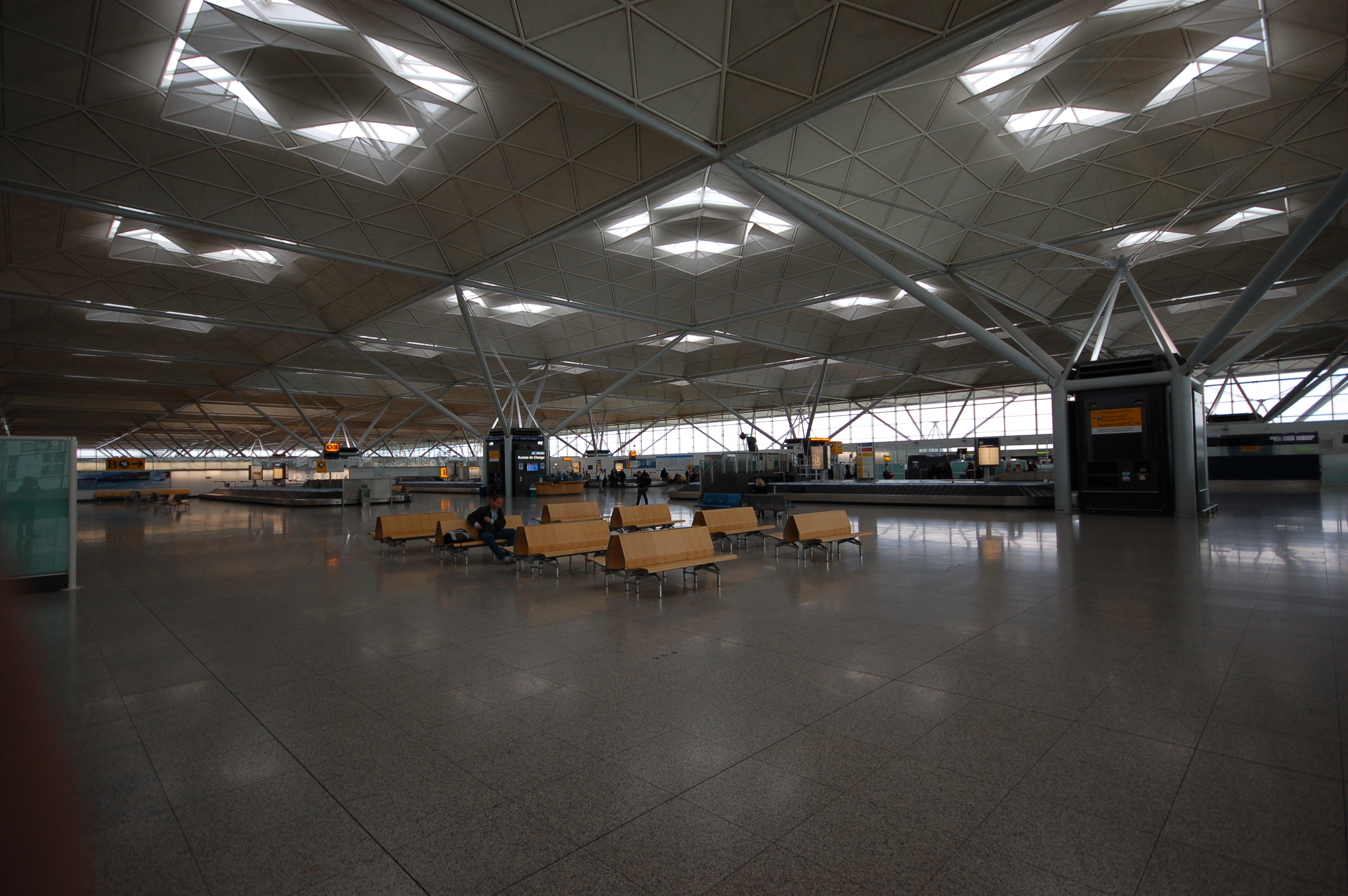
The arrivals hall

Beginning in 1966, after Stansted was placed under BAA control, the airport was used by holiday charter operators wishing to escape the higher costs associated with operating from Heathrow and Gatwick.

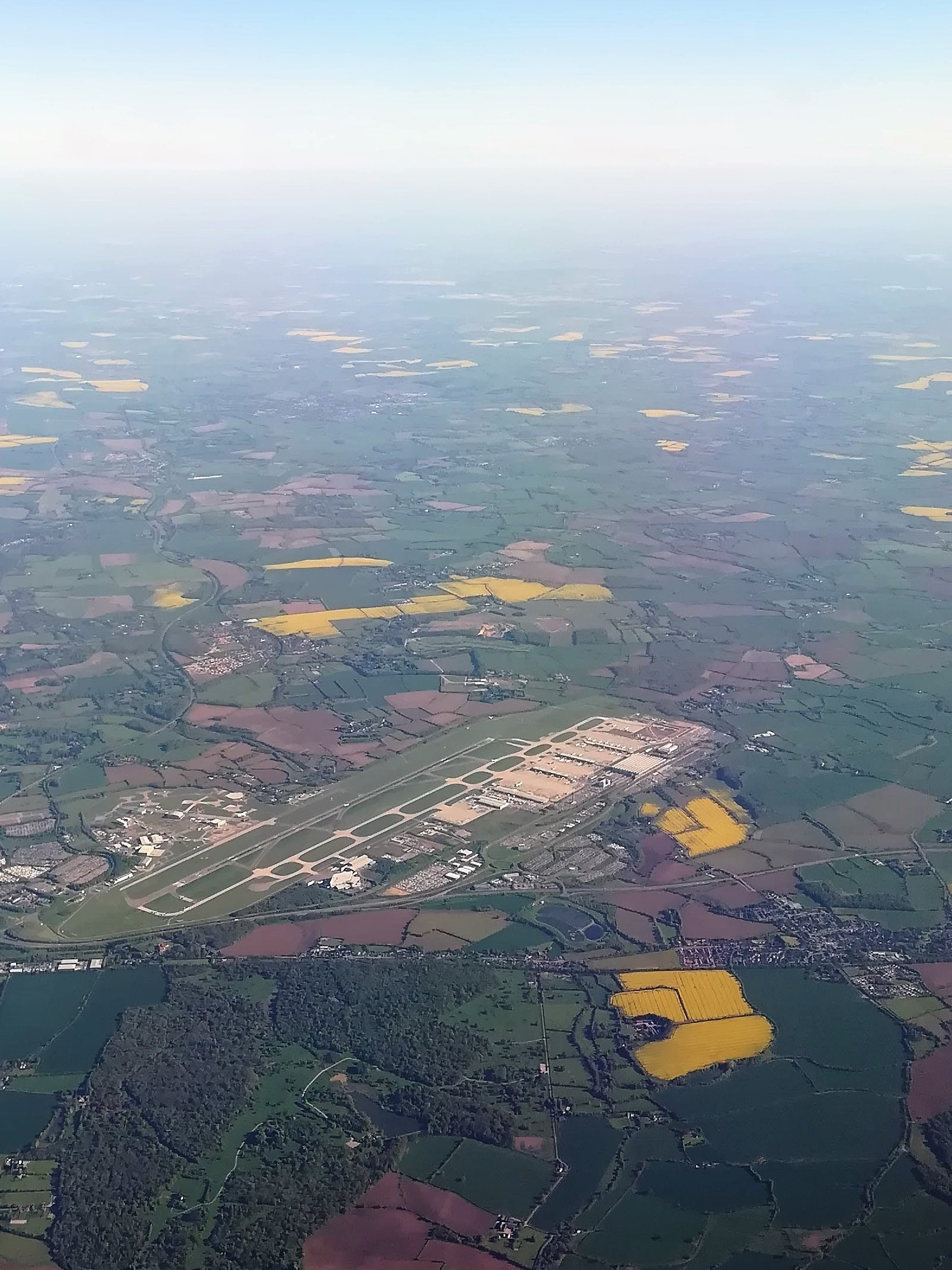
Aerial view of Stansted

Stansted had been held in reserve as a third London airport since the 1950s. However, after a public inquiry at Chelmsford in 1966–67, the government set up the Roskill Commission to review the need afresh. The Commission for the Third London Airport (the "Roskill Commission") of 1968–71 did not include Stansted as one of its four short-listed sites and recommended that Cublington in Buckinghamshire should be developed as London's third airport. However, the Conservative government under Ted Heath agreed with a minority recommendation that a site at Foulness in the Thames Estuary, later renamed Maplin, should be developed, but in 1974, the incoming Labour government under Harold Wilson cancelled the Maplin project because of the economic situation.

Stansted was then considered as an option for long-term development in the Advisory Committee on Airports Policy and the Study Group on South East Airports and was selected from a short list of six by the Conservative government in December 1979. The proposal, for a new terminal associated with the existing runway and the safeguarding of land for a second runway, was considered at the Airports Inquiries of 1981–83. The Inspector's Report was published in 1984 and the decision, announced in a white paper in 1985, was to approve a plan to develop Stansted in two phases, involving both airfield and terminal improvements that would increase the airport's capacity to 15 million passengers per year, but to reject the second runway.

==== Redevelopment into London's third airport ====
The redevelopment of Stansted into London's third airport began with outline planning permission granted in 1985, for a new terminal building to accommodate up to 15 million passengers annually.

Initially, the project was planned in two phases. The first phase was designed to permit an annual capacity of 8 million passengers, while the second phase was intended to expand the terminal's capacity to 15 million passengers per annum. It was initially believed that any future development beyond this capacity would require the construction of a second major terminal building.

==== Foster Associates terminal ====
Foster Associates, founded by architect Norman Foster, was commissioned to design the new terminal building, with structural engineering led by Peter Rice at principal engineers Ove Arup & Partners. The plans were approved in 1985, and construction took place between 1988 and 1991 by the John Laing company at a cost of £100 million. The terminal building originally comprised a square structure of 11 bays by 11 bays, and opened to the public in 1991. It received the European Union Prize for Contemporary Architecture (Mies van der Rohe Award) in 1990. As part of the development, a railway branch was built to the airport for Stansted Airport railway station, built at ground level within the terminal.

The building was recognised as a landmark work of high-tech architecture. Foster + Partners' design for Stansted Airport is widely regarded as a transformative influence on airport architecture. The building features open canopies that visually connect the landside and airside, and challenged conventional airport layouts by relocating essential services underground, instead creating an open and flexible main concourse that is naturally illuminated. The "floating" roof, supported by a space frame of inverted-pyramid roof trusses, creates the impression of a stylised swan in flight. The base of each truss structure is a "utility pillar", which provides indirect uplighting illumination and is the location for air-conditioning, water, telecommunications, and electrical outlets. The layout of the airport was originally designed to provide an unobstructed flow for passengers to arrive at the short-stay car park, move through the check-in hall, and go through security and on to the departure gates, all on the same level. These principles influenced the design of future projects around the world.

In 1999, planning permission was granted for Phase 2 of the terminal expansion, which included extending the width to 15 bays, as well as the addition of the third satellite building.

==== Further developments ====
A major expansion programme to the terminal took place between 2007 and 2009, extending the width by 2 bays, with nearly 5,900 m^{2} (64,000 sq ft) of floorspace, to give space for additional baggage carousels, a new immigration and passport control hall.

In November 2006, Uttlesford District Council rejected a BAA planning application to increase the permitted number of aircraft movements and to remove the limit on passenger numbers. BAA immediately appealed against the decision and a public inquiry opened, lasting from May until October 2007. Planning Inspector Alan Boyland made his recommendations in January 2008. Those recommendations were largely followed by the Secretary of State for Transport (Geoff Hoon) and the Secretary of State for Communities and Local Government (Hazel Blears), who jointly allowed the applicant's appeal in October 2008. A legal challenge by community campaign group Stop Stansted Expansion was rejected by the High Court in March 2009.

The Competition Commission ruled in March 2009 that BAA should sell Gatwick and Stansted Airports within two years. The ruling was quashed within a year following an appeal, but was subsequently upheld. The Competition Commission reconfirmed its ruling in July 2011 that the airport be sold, and the Court of Appeal turned down an appeal by BAA on 26 July 2012. In light of the result, BAA chose not to appeal to the Supreme Court of the United Kingdom and confirmed on 20 August 2012 that the airport would be sold.

=== Under MAG ownership (2013–) ===
In January 2013 it was announced that MAG (Manchester Airports Group) had agreed to purchase London Stansted Airport for £1.5 billion. The sale was completed on 28 February 2013.

MAG announced on 20 June 2013 as part of a visit to the airport by the Secretary of State for Transport that it would be launching an £80 million terminal redevelopment programme. MAG has invested £40 million and the remainder was invested by other commercial partners. The redevelopment included relocation of the security area, doubling the amount of seating, and improving the information displays. The new Departure Lounge offers a food court, new shops, and an Escape Lounge.

In 2017, Antonov Airlines opened a UK office at Stansted for cargo charter flights, generally of outsize loads.

==== COVID-19 pandemic and recovery ====
The COVID-19 pandemic had a severe impact on London Stansted Airport, leading to a significant reduction in passenger numbers and operational challenges. In 2020, the airport served just over 7.5 million passengers, a large decline from its pre-pandemic levels of around 28 million annually. At the height of the crisis, Stansted experienced a 95% drop in passenger footfall compared to 2019. Cargo operations, however, saw a 53% increase as the airport adapted to new demands. Airport authorities described the situation as an unprecedented crisis, likening the passenger levels to those seen in the early 1990s.

As travel restrictions began to ease in July 2021, London Stansted Airport experienced widespread disruption as passenger numbers surged during the summer holidays. The airport faced staff shortages and increased COVID-19 documentation requirements, leading to long queues and chaotic scenes, with insufficient personnel available to manage the crowds effectively. The airport showed signs of recovery by late 2022, with passenger levels nearing 97% of pre-pandemic volumes.

In the wake of this recovery, in 2023 Stansted Airport announced a £1.1 billion expansion plan including a £600 million extension of the terminal and facilities, to increase its capacity to generate revenue from up to 43 million passengers per year. This expansion is expected to add 200 flights per day to the airport's schedule and create over 5,000 jobs over the next five years.

== Infrastructure ==
=== Terminal and satellite buildings ===
The terminal is separated into three general areas: Check-in and main concourse along the front, departures towards the southern end, and international arrivals to the northern end of the building. There is a separate baggage reclaim for Domestic arrivals. No gates are in the main terminal building; instead, they are located in three separate oblong satellite buildings, one connected to the main terminal by air bridges, one by the Stansted Airport Transit System people mover, and one by both. Four further bussing gates are accessed from below the main terminal building. The airport has 52 gates with 12 serviceable jetbridges. Long-term plans for Satellite 4, approved in 1999 and revised in 2005, have not been realised, but its site was developed as remote stands in 2018.

As of 2013, Satellite 1 (Gates 1-19) had been redeveloped with the aim to attract more long-haul airlines to Stansted. Furthermore, a dual jetbridge has been added at Stand 13 (Boarding Gate 12), allowing faster boarding and deboarding of wide-body aircraft. An additional building, known as the Advanced Passenger Vehicle (APV), was brought back into use in 2016 for flights departing during the busy 06:00 to 09:00 period. The APV building was linked to the main terminal building by an accessible route and acted as a bus terminal for international flights at remote stands. Prior to the completion of Satellite 3, this terminal (then consisted of gates 90–95) was in regular passenger use. As of July 2026, the APV building has since been decommissioned and subsequently demolished.

Satellite building	Gate numbers	Passenger access	Notes
Satellite 1	1–19	Transit system	Used by most major airlines such as British Airways, Emirates, Pegasus, TUI and Jet2. This area is not used by Ryanair and EasyJet, furthest in distance but first stop on transit from the main terminal. Around four minutes transit ride – this terminal has 10 jetbridges at gates 1,2,3,4,6,7,12,13,16 and 19. The remaining gates 5, 11, 14, 15 and 18 have airbridges but steps at the end of them.. Gate 2 is specially designed where there are three exits, gate 2A (exterior boarding), gate 2B (jetbridge) and gate 2C (coaching gate). Gate 17, formerly a gate without a jetbridge was put out of use
Satellite 2	29–39	Transit system	Used by AJet, Ryanair, Transavia and EasyJet. Situated in the upper level of Satellite 2 accessed via the second stop on transit from the main terminal. Jetbridges must be accessed by stairs, by lift or by escalator one floor down (same level as gates 81–88). Around seven minutes transit ride. Only four of the jetbridges (Gates 30/88, 31/87, 33 and 37) are in service as of October 2024.. In preparation for the closure of TTS, the TTS no longer serves gates 29-39, so passengers take the airbridge for 81-88 then are routed through gate 87 staircase. gates 27 and 28 exist as bus gates on the ground floor of satellite 2
Satellite 2	81–88	Walkway from main terminal	Used by EasyJet as well as Ryanair and occasionally by other airlines, for international and domestic departures. Located below gates 29–39, and only takes up half of the first floor, but parallel to the jetbridges, which are also used by gates 29–39. Around ten minutes walk from the terminal. Although these gates do have the jetbridges, they are out of use
Satellite 3	40–59	Walkway from main terminal	Used exclusively by Ryanair; this building is currently not equipped with jet bridges, however gates 40-49 do have a fixed airbridge with steps attached to the end. Around 15 minutes walk from the main terminal. Gates 40-50 are on Level 1 and require walk boarding and gates 51-59 are remote gates / walking gates on the lower level

Domestic arrivals (from the UK) use a separate exit route, located in a separate building close to the railway station. This exit is connected solely by a bus upon arrival.

Common Travel Area arrivals are coached from stand, and taken to a separate entrance located at the North East of the terminal which leads to the main terminal baggage reclaim belts, bypassing Border Force, but without bypassing Customs.

=== Car parks ===
Stansted has a variety of car parking including long-, mid-, and short-stay options along with valet and meet-and-greet parking services. Two drop off areas also are available. The express area is located near the short-stay car park, while a free service is within the mid-stay area. A fee is charged for the express service. Terminal Road North and its free drop-off area directly outside the terminal was closed shortly after MAG took over the airport in 2013.

=== Control tower ===
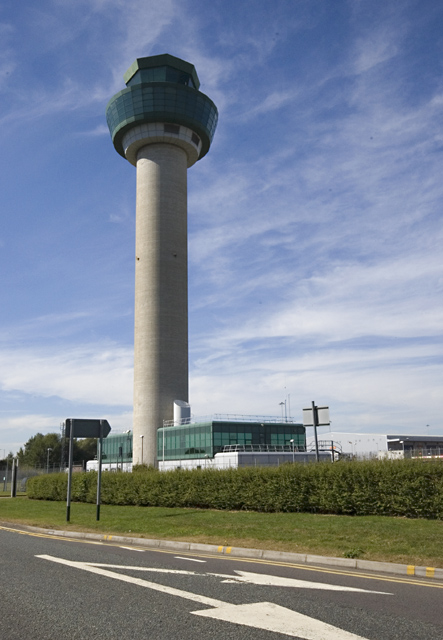
Air traffic control tower

Stansted's air traffic control tower was completed in 1996 and was the tallest in Britain at the time of its construction. It is located on the southside of the airfield alongside the main terminal building. It replaced the old control tower, which offered poor views of the airfield once the current terminal building was opened in 1991. On clear days, the control tower can be seen from The Shard in central London, at a distance of 48.5km.

=== Cargo handling ===
There are several cargo buildings and hangars around the airfield. The main cargo centre is located by the control tower and handles most cargo operations, including aircraft such as the McDonnell Douglas MD-11 and the Boeing 747. There are a small number of hangars on the other side of the runway to the rest of the airport. The largest are located at the south east of the airfield, one of which is used by Ryanair.

=== Other facilities ===
Titan Airways has its head office in the Enterprise House on the airport property. Several airlines at one time had their head offices on the airport property. AirUK (later KLM uk) had its head office in the Stansted House. When Buzz existed, its head office was in the Endeavour House. When AB Airlines existed, its head office was in the Enterprise House. For a period Lloyd International Airways had its head office at the Lloyd House at Stansted. When Go Fly existed its head office was at the Enterprise House.

Since 2004, Stansted also offers a range of hotel accommodation including Holiday Inn Express, Novotel, Premier Inn, and Radisson Blu hotels and the recently opened Hampton by Hilton, the last two of which are both within two minutes of the terminal building via an undercover walkway. Regular bus service handles transfers between the terminal building and Stansted's car parks and hotels.

== Proposed developments ==
=== Runway ===
==== Plans for a second runway ====
On 11 March 2008, BAA submitted a planning application (titled "G2") to expand the airport by 3 sq mi (8 km^{2}) and for the construction of a second runway and terminal, etc., in line with a recommendation in the 2003 Air Transport White Paper (ATWP). This would have been the subject of a public inquiry, and if approved, would have allowed Stansted to handle more passengers than Heathrow did at the time of the application.

In May 2010, BAA withdrew its plans to build a second runway at Stansted and withdrew the plans to build a new runway at Heathrow.

The ATWP had anticipated that a second runway would be operational by 2011, but this date continued to slip. BAA's 2008 planning application envisaged operation commencing in 2015, and in 2009, BAA revised the anticipated opening date to 2017.

Prior to the United Kingdom's May 2010 general election, all three major political parties pledged not to approve a second runway. Soon after the election, the new government confirmed this, and BAA withdrew its application for planning permission, having spent nearly £200 million preparing for the public inquiry and buying up properties.

The public inquiry into BAA's second runway application had been scheduled to start on 15 April 2009, but the start was delayed by Secretary of State Hazel Blears to allow time for BAA and the government to consider the implications of the March 2009 Competition Commission's ruling that BAA must sell Stansted within two years. As 2011 drew to a close, BAA was still appealing against the Competition Commission ruling. On 20 August 2012, after losing a case at the Court of Appeal, BAA agreed to cease challenging the Competition Commission's ruling and to sell Stansted.

On 10 February 2010, Secretary of State John Denham, in an open letter, concluded that the inquiry could not reasonably start until after the general election. In addition, he commented that the planning application documents were nearly two years old and would require updating. Eventually, BAA realised the futility of pursuing its G2 application in the context of the new government policy and withdrew it on 24 May 2010.

==== Stop Stansted Expansion ====
The advocacy group Stop Stansted Expansion (SSE) was formed in 2002, as a working group of the North West Essex and East Herts Preservation Association, in response to the Government's consultation on expanding UK airports and, particularly, runway expansion plans for Stansted Airport subsequently defined in the Air Transport white paper in December 2003. In September 2012, as a result of pressure from the aviation industry, the government set up the Airports Commission, chaired by Sir Howard Davies, to consider what, if anything, needed to be done to maintain the UK's status as a global aviation hub. The commission concluded that an additional runway would be required for South East England and that it should be added to either Heathrow or Gatwick. Following the 2015 election, the commission made a final recommendation to expand Heathrow subject to certain environmental constraints.

=== Terminal ===
==== Ongoing Terminal extension ====
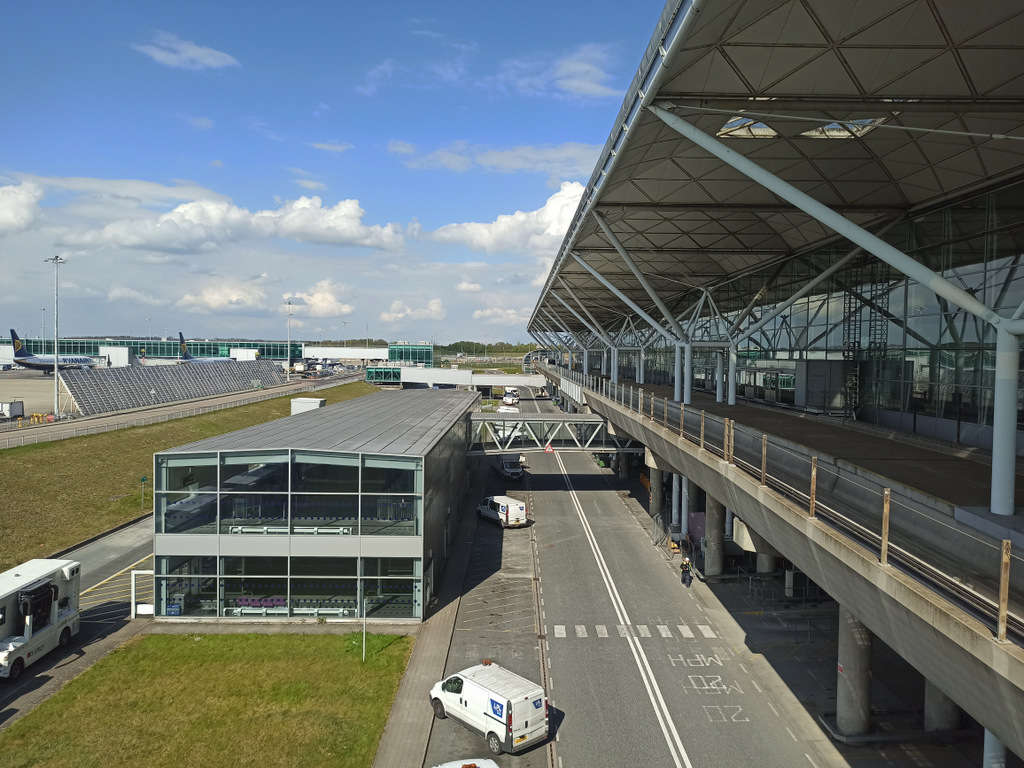
The terminal will be extended by three bays to the rear, replacing the passenger transit system.

In July 2023, MAG announced a new proposal for a reconfiguration and three-bay extension to the existing terminal building, which will increase its size by a third. This plan aims to create increased passenger amenities, with an expected cost of £600 million. The extension plan will increase the terminal's size by 16,500 square metres, and is designed to accommodate an increase in passenger capacity from 35 million to 43 million annual passengers. On 1 November 2023, the government's Planning Inspectorate approved the expansion plan. The new terminal design will incorporate a larger departure lounge, an enlarged security hall, and new amenities, including additional shops, bars, and restaurants. The baggage reclaim area will also feature new carousels and increased baggage handling capacity. The redevelopment will include the installation of new check-in desks and next-generation security scanners. Satellite 2 (gates 20-39) is also currently undergoing an upgrade and modernisation programme, with new flooring, lighting, and gate area seating. The existing gate areas are also being reconfigured to model conventional gate-rooms as seen in other airports, with the aim to create more space for passengers when pre-boarding their aircraft

As part of the redevelopment project, the existing passenger transit system will be decommissioned and replaced with new walkways that will connect the terminal to the satellite buildings. Additionally, the immigration hall will be relocated to a new area downstairs within the terminal. Also included in the programme is the installation of a 14.3-megawatt on-site solar farm.

Construction of the extension is planned to begin in 2025 and is expected to last two to three years.

==== Proposed Satellite 4 ====
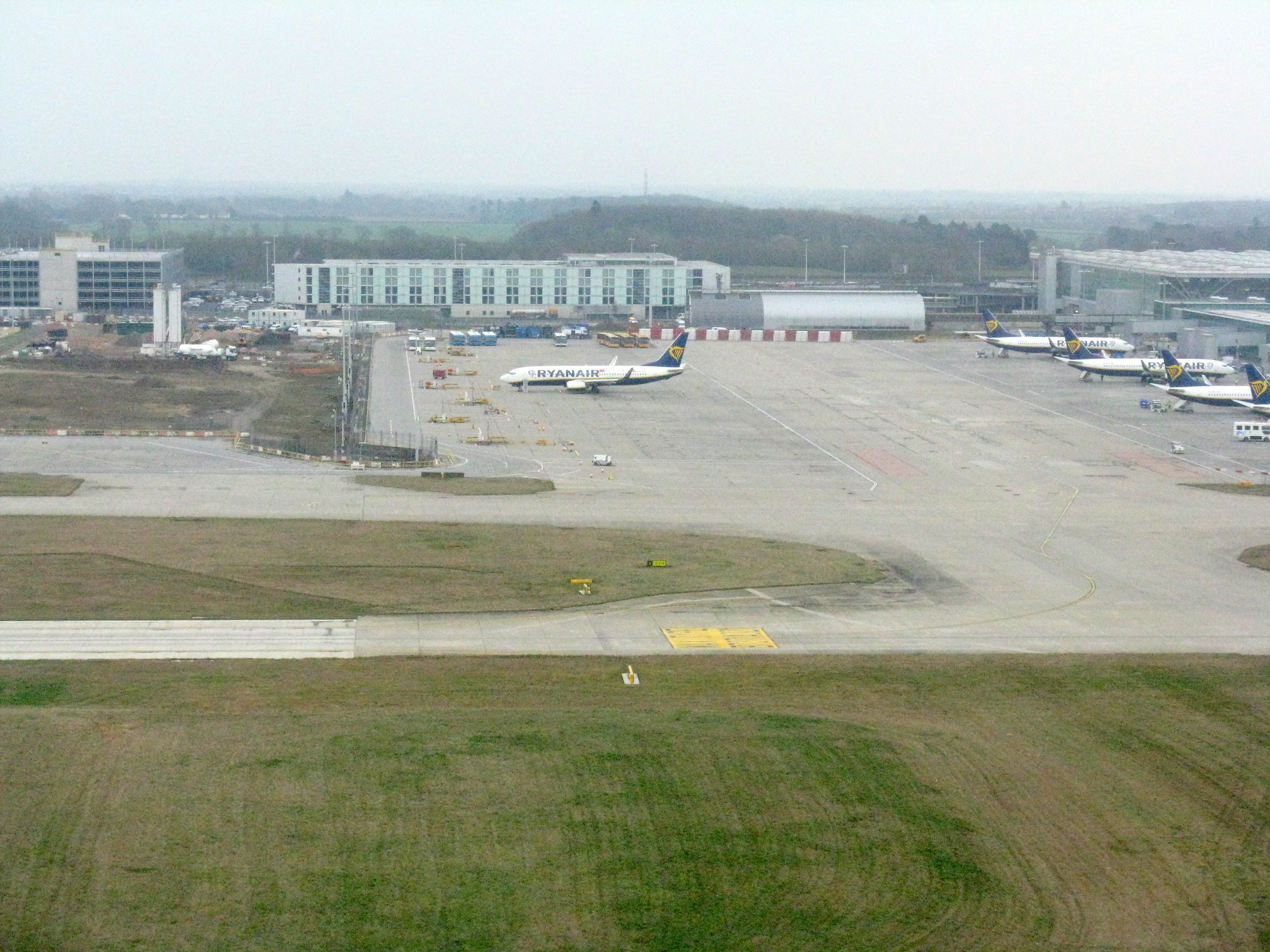
The possible location of Satellite 4 is seen on the left.

Plans for Satellite 4 have never been realised. Located to the northeast of Satellite 3, Satellite 4 was approved for planning permission in 1999 as part of an expansion strategy to increase the airport's capacity from 8 to 15 million passengers per annum. A revised scheme in 2005 included a pier link for the proposed satellite, with construction planned for 2013-2015, however plans did not proceed after the sale of BAA to Ferrovial, and construction never commenced. In 2018, the site of Satellite 4 was instead built as remote stands. The current expansion plans for 2024 do not include Satellite 4, and instead focuses on other airfield and terminal improvements.

==== Formerly proposed Arrivals Terminal ====
In December 2016, London Stansted Airport unveiled plans for a new £130 million arrivals terminal aimed to handle increasing passenger numbers and relieve pressure on the existing single-terminal setup, which is the busiest of its kind in the UK.

The new arrivals terminal was to be located adjacent to the existing terminal and Radisson Blu Hotel. It would feature a larger immigration and baggage reclaim area. This new facility would allow the existing terminal to be reconfigured exclusively for departures, expanding space for check-in, security, and the international departures lounge, and would make London Stansted the only airport in the UK with separate arrivals and departures terminals.

Initial construction was due to start in 2018, taking three years to complete. However, the arrivals terminal was put on hold at the end of 2019, due to fluctuating travel demand and economic uncertainties. In 2020, Uttlesford District Council refused planning permission for the expansion plan, but the Planning Inspectorate overturned this decision following a public inquiry in 2021. Despite the approval, further delays and changes to the airport's priorities led to the arrivals terminal being deferred.

In 2023, following a review of various proposals for increasing terminal capacity, Stansted Airport decided to cancel the arrivals terminal project, opting instead to focus on expanding the existing 1991 terminal building.

==== Formerly proposed artwork ====
As part of the terminal's initial development, in 1988 Norman Foster and British architectural artist Brian Clarke made several proposals for an integral artwork for the terminal building. The principal proposal would have seen the east and west elevations of the terminal clad in two sequences of traditionally mouth-blown, leaded stained glass, along the full 162-metre (531 ft) length of the building. However, for technical and security reasons, the artwork was not executed. In 1991, the British Airports Authority commissioned a second, smaller stained glass project from Clarke for Stansted Airport in place of the 1988 proposal. The artist designed two stained glass friezes and a 6-metre (20 ft) high tower of stained glass for a circulation area in the centre of the terminal which, in their composition, echoed elements of Foster's structure; by 1994 the tower had been removed to 'allow greater flow of traffic through the space', and later the friezes were likewise removed.

== Airlines and destinations ==
=== Passenger ===
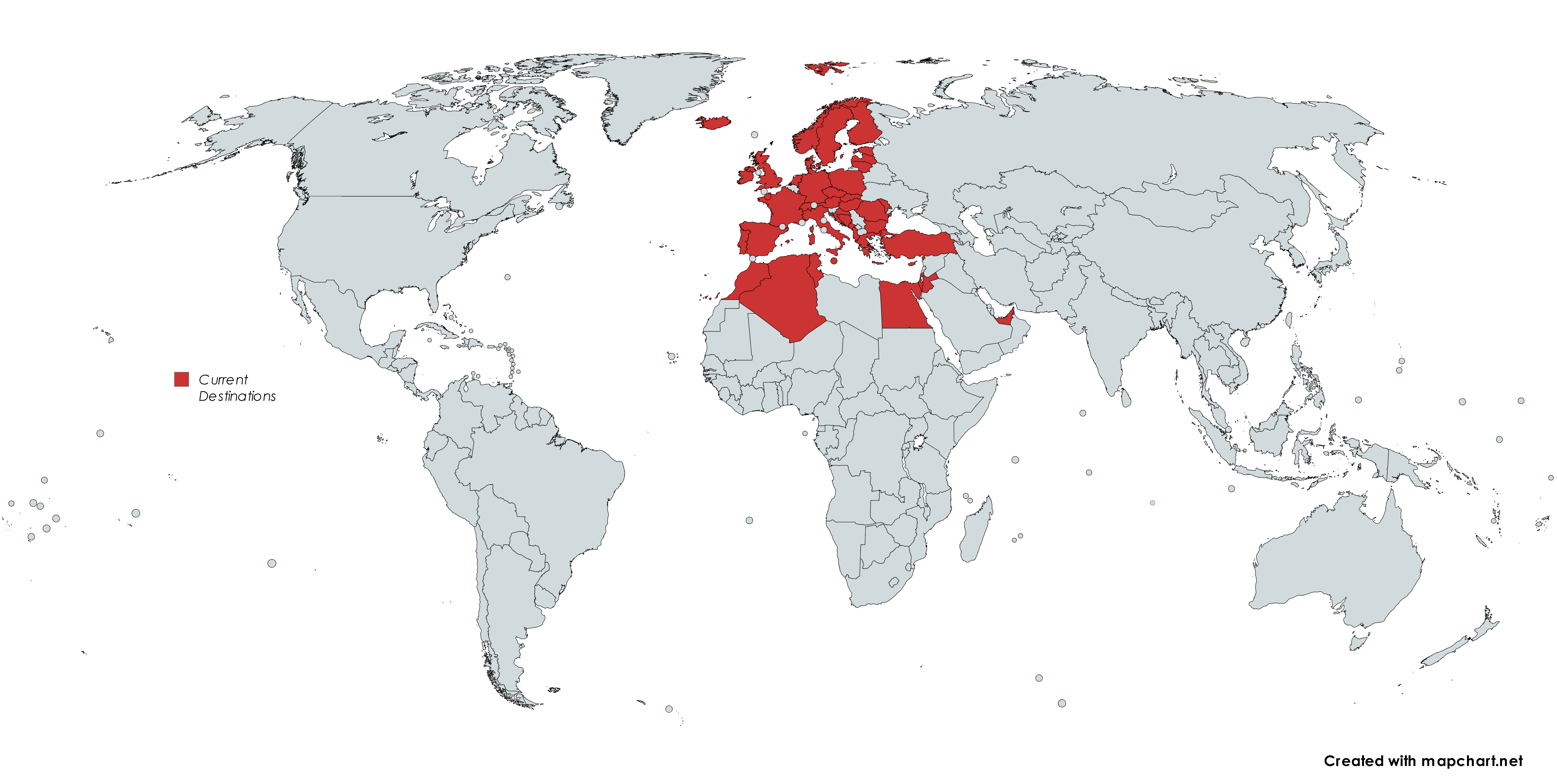
Stansted Airport passenger destinations

The following airlines operate regular scheduled flights to and from Stansted Airport:

Airlines	Destinations
Air Algérie	Algiers
AJet	Ankara, Istanbul–Sabiha Gökçen; Seasonal: Bodrum
Arkia	Tel Aviv
British Airways	Florence (ends 11 April 2027); Seasonal: Bergerac, Chambéry, Geneva, Ibiza, Nice, Olbia (all end 11 April 2027)
Corendon Airlines	Seasonal: Antalya
Cyprus Airways	Larnaca (begins 23 April 2027)
EasyJet	Amsterdam, Belfast–International, Edinburgh, Glasgow, Paris–Charles de Gaulle; Seasonal: Geneva, Zurich
Emirates	Dubai–International
HiSky	Chișinău
Jet2.com	Agadir, Alicante, Antalya, Faro, Fuerteventura, Gran Canaria, Hurghada (begins 12 February 2027), Lanzarote, Málaga, Malta, Marrakesh, Paphos, Paris–Charles de Gaulle (begins 25 March 2027), Rome–Fiumicino, Sharm El Sheikh (begins 11 February 2027), Tenerife–South; Seasonal: Almería (begins 1 May 2027), Athens, Bodrum, Burgas, Catania, Chambéry, Chania, Corfu, Dalaman, Dubrovnik, Enfidha (begins 2 May 2027), Geneva, Girona, Grenoble, Heraklion, Ibiza, Innsbruck (begins 19 December 2026), Izmir, Jerez de la Frontera, Jersey (resumes 1 May 2027), Kalamata, Kavala (begins 11 May 2027), Kefalonia, Kos, Kraków, Larnaca, Menorca, Mytilene, Naples, Olbia, Palma de Mallorca, Prague, Preveza/Lefkada, Pula, Reus, Reykjavík–Keflavík, Rhodes, Salzburg, Samos, Santorini, Skiathos, Split, Strasbourg (begins 26 November 2026), Thessaloniki, Tivat, Verona, Vienna, Zakynthos
Lufthansa	Seasonal: Munich
Pegasus Airlines	Adana/Mersin, Ankara, Antalya, Istanbul–Sabiha Gökçen, Izmir
Royal Air Maroc	Casablanca
Royal Jordanian	Amman–Queen Alia
Ryanair	Aarhus, Agadir, Alicante, Ancona, Athens, Barcelona, Bari, Basel/Mulhouse, Belfast–International, Bergamo, Berlin, Biarritz, Bodrum, Bologna, Bratislava, Bremen (ends 27 March 2027), Brindisi, Brno, Bucharest–Otopeni, Budapest, Bydgoszcz, Cagliari, Carcassonne, Castellón, Catania, Cluj-Napoca, Cologne/Bonn, Copenhagen, Cork, Dalaman, Dublin, Dubrovnik, Edinburgh, Eindhoven, Essaouira, Faro, Fez, Fuerteventura, Funchal, Gdańsk, Genoa, Girona, Glasgow, Gothenburg, Gran Canaria, Hahn, Hamburg, Helsinki, Karlsruhe/Baden-Baden, Katowice, Kaunas, Kerry, Knock, Košice, Kraków, Lamezia Terme, Lanzarote, Limoges, Lisbon, Łódź, Lourdes, Lübeck, Luxembourg, Madrid, Málaga, Malmö, Malta, Marrakesh, Marseille, Memmingen, Milan–Malpensa, Münster/Osnabrück, Murcia, Nantes, Naples, Newquay, Nuremberg, Olsztyn-Mazury, Oslo, Ostrava, Palanga, Palermo, Palma de Mallorca, Paphos, Parma, Perugia, Pescara, Pisa, Plovdiv, Podgorica, Poitiers, Porto, Poznań, Prague, Rabat, Riga, Rome–Ciampino, Rzeszów, Salzburg, Sandefjord, Santander, Santiago de Compostela, Seville, Shannon, Sofia, Stockholm–Arlanda, Stockholm–Västerås, Szczecin, Tallinn, Tangier, Tenerife–South, Thessaloniki, Tirana, Toulouse, Trapani, Trieste, Turin, Valencia, Venice, Verona, Vienna, Vilnius, Warsaw–Modlin, Wrocław, Zagreb, Zaragoza; Seasonal: Alghero, Almería, Bergerac, Béziers, Brive, Chania, Corfu, Forlì, Grenoble, Ibiza, Kefalonia, Klagenfurt, Kos, La Rochelle, Linz, Menorca, Nice, Nimes, Olbia, Osijek, Perpignan, Preveza/Lefkada, Pula, Reggio Calabria, Reus, Rijeka, Rimini, Rhodes, Rodez, Rovaniemi, Salerno, Santorini, Sarajevo, Tours, Zadar, Zakynthos
SkyUp Airlines	Chișinău (begins 26 March 2027)
SunExpress	Adana/Mersin, Antalya, Gaziantep, Izmir; Seasonal: Kayseri
Transavia	Rotterdam/The Hague
TUI Airways	Seasonal: Chambéry, Corfu, Enfidha, Gran Canaria, Heraklion, Ibiza, Innsbruck, Kefalonia, Kos, Menorca, Palma de Mallorca, Paphos, Rhodes, Sharm El Sheikh, Tenerife–South, Turin, Verona, Zakynthos
Turkish Airlines	Istanbul

=== Cargo ===
Airlines	Destinations
AirZeta	Almaty, Frankfurt, Seoul–Incheon
Cargolux	Luxembourg
China Southern Cargo	Guangzhou
Emirates SkyCargo	Brussels, Dubai–Al Maktoum
FedEx Express	Dublin, Frankfurt, Memphis, Paris–Charles de Gaulle
Qatar Airways Cargo	Doha
Turkish Cargo	Istanbul
UPS Airlines	Cologne/Bonn, Hong Kong, Louisville, Philadelphia

=== Route development ===
Long-haul scheduled services commenced in 1987 with a short lived service from the Scottish airline Highland Express to Newark Liberty International Airport via Prestwick Airport. In the early 1990s American Airlines operated a transatlantic service between Stansted and Chicago–O'Hare, but the route was unprofitable and was withdrawn in 1993. Continental Airlines also operated a short lived service from 2 May 2001 from Newark Liberty International Airport, but this service was stopped shortly after the September 11 attacks in 2001.

Long-haul services to the United States returned in late 2005, when Eos Airlines and MAXjet Airways commenced all-business class services from Stansted to New York–JFK. In 2006, MAXjet expanded their service with flights to Washington–Dulles, Las Vegas, and Los Angeles. American Airlines began daily flights to Stansted in October 2007 from New York–JFK and was originally expected to operate a second daily flight from April 2008. However, because of the 2000s energy crisis, the 2008 financial crisis, and worsening credit environment at the time, all three services to the United States have since been discontinued following the demise of MAXjet Airways in December 2007 and Eos Airlines in April 2008. Finally, in July 2008, American Airlines withdrew from Stansted, alongside its services to Gatwick, and consolidated all operations at Heathrow.

Long-haul transatlantic operations made a brief return to Stansted in June 2010, when Sun Country Airlines announced a seasonal weekly service from Stansted to Minneapolis/St. Paul. The flights made a refuelling stopover in Gander, Newfoundland and Labrador as the aircraft used for the flight, a Boeing 737-800, would not be able to complete a nonstop westbound flight from Stansted to Minneapolis. The flights operated from 11 June to 15 August 2010. In 2011, Sun Country operated to Gatwick rather than Stansted and then discontinued flights due to the price involved in carrying fuel on long-haul flights.. Long-haul services to Asia commenced in March 2009 with Malaysian low-cost airline AirAsia X providing direct flights to Kuala Lumpur International Airport; however, on 24 October 2011, this service moved to Gatwick Airport before being later withdrawn completely. Low-cost airline Primera Air launched non-stop flights from Stansted to Boston, Newark, Toronto-Pearson and Washington–Dulles, until the collapse of the airline meant the discontinuation of the routes by 2018, leaving Stansted without transatlantic routes once more. In 2018, Emirates began operating daily flights to its hub at Dubai-International using its Boeing 777-300ER aircraft. The route has since increased to a twice daily service.

The COVID-19 pandemic negatively impacted the aviation industry, with Stansted Airport not being immune from the fallout. Ural Airlines (to Moscow–Domodedovo), Scandinavian Airlines (to Copenhagen), Air India (to Amritsar and Mumbai), Air Senegal (to Dakar–Diass) and El Al (to Tel Aviv), were either scheduled to begin in 2020, or had recently begun operation but have since not returned. Additionally, easyJet, one of the largest operators at the airport at the time, announced the closure of their base at Stansted, which had more than two dozen routes and existed for more than a decade, in August 2020.

== Statistics ==
=== Development ===
In 1988, over 1.1 million passengers passed through Stansted, the first time annual passenger numbers had exceeded 1 million at the airport. Consistent year-on-year growth followed, and by 1997, the total had reached over 5 million, rapidly rising to almost 12 million in 2000.

In 2007, passenger numbers peaked at nearly 24 million, but then declined for five years, and in 2012, the total was around 17.5 million. An increase of 2.2% was recorded in 2013 to 17.8 million passengers, then 11.7% in 2014 to 19.9 million, followed by 12.8% in 2015 to 22.5 million, and 8.0% in 2016 to a record total of 24.3 million, making Stansted the fourth-busiest airport in the United Kingdom. Stansted also is a major freight airport, the third-busiest in the UK during 2016, behind London Heathrow and East Midlands Airport, handling in excess of 223,203 tonnes per annum, although freight throughput has declined slightly from its 2005 peak level.

Passenger numbers for the year ending September 2016 increased by 8.4% to over 24 million for the first time since 2007. Passenger numbers for 2023 was 28 million.

=== Traffic figures ===
Year	Passengers (Note: Number of passengers including both domestic and international)	Percentage change	Aircraft movements (Note: Number of movements represents total aircraft takeoffs and landings during that year.)	Freight (tonnes)
2000	11,878,190	–	165,779	167,823
2001	13,665,333	▲15.0%	169,583	165,660
2002	16,054,522	▲17.5%	170,544	184,449
2003	18,722,112	▲16.6%	186,475	198,565
2004	20,910,842	▲11.7%	192,245	225,772
2005	21,998,673	▲5.2%	193,511	237,045
2006	23,687,013	▲7.7%	206,693	224,312
2007	23,779,697	▲0.4%	208,462	203,747
2008	22,360,364	▼6.0%	193,282	197,738
2009	19,957,077	▼10.7%	167,817	182,810
2010	18,573,592	▼6.9%	155,140	202,238
2011	18,052,843	▼2.8%	148,317	202,593
2012	17,472,699	▼3.2%	143,511	214,160
2013	17,852,393	▲2.2%	146,324	211,952
2014	19,941,593	▲11.7%	157,117	204,725
2015	22,519,178	▲12.9%	168,629	207,996
2016	24,320,071	▲8.0%	180,430	223,203
2017	25,902,618	▲6.5%	189,919	236,892
2018	27,996,116	▲8.1%	201,614	226,128
2019	28,139,051	▲0.5%	199,925	224,139
2020	7,536,869	▼72.2%	86,107	254,573
2021	7,145,802	▼5.2%	93,316	263,631
2022	23,289,652	▲225.9%	159,502	243 153
2023	27,951,291	▲20.0%	179,135	251,864
2024	29,694,000	▲6.2%	201,031	294,355
^{Source: UK Civil Aviation Authority}

=== Busiest routes ===
Busiest routes to and from Stansted (2025)
Rank	Airport	Total passengers	Change 2024 / 25
1	Dublin, Ireland	993,744	▲4.1%
2	Istanbul–Sabiha Gökçen, Turkey	964,152	▲9.4%
3	Edinburgh, United Kingdom	720,275	▲4.0%
4	Rome–Ciampino, Italy	564,539	▲0.9%
5	Belfast–International, United Kingdom	562,813	▼1.0%
6	Barcelona, Spain	505,957	▼0.4%
7	Alicante, Spain	499,052	▲2.6%
8	Bergamo, Italy	490,293	▼1.8%
9	Tenerife–South, Spain	474,326	▼8.7%
10	Budapest, Hungary	456,267	▼8.2%
11	Madrid, Spain	450,705	▲1.7%
12	Palma de Mallorca, Spain	450,603	▼4.9%
13	Málaga, Spain	440,942	▲1.1%
14	Bucharest, Romania	435,549	▼1.6%
15	Berlin, Germany	428,407	▼1.3%
16	Dubai-International, United Arab Emirates	417,773	▼4.3%
17	Lisbon, Portugal	417,200	▲1.3%
18	Faro, Portugal	404,295	▲0.1%
19	Copenhagen, Denmark	384,483	▲6.5%
20	Porto, Portugal	377,382	▲1.6%

== Ground transport ==
=== Airside Transit system ===
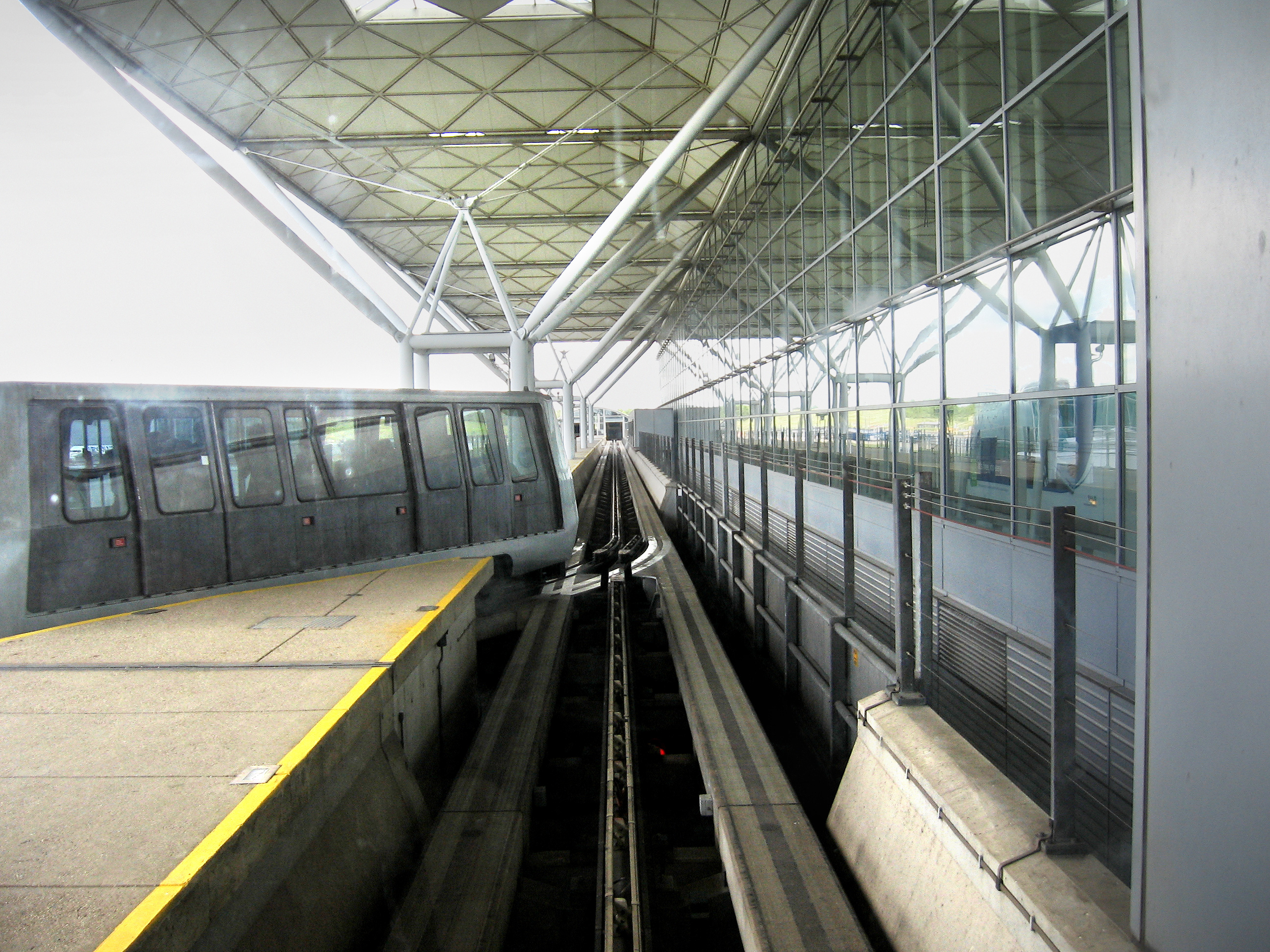
The transit system which links the main terminal building to satellite buildings 1 (gates 1 – 19) and 2 (gates 20 – 39)

The Stansted Airport Transit System connects the terminal to the satellite buildings via a 2 mi (3 km) free automated people mover service, which runs on dual concrete tracks. The system uses a mix of Adtranz C-100 and CX-100 vehicles to carry passengers to departure gates. Unlike the similar Gatwick Airport Shuttle Transit, the Stansted transit is only accessible "airside" (i.e. only after passengers pass through security). As part of the airport expansion plans, it is planned to decommission the Transit System in 2027 to make way for an expanded terminal. The transit will be replaced with pedestrian bridges.

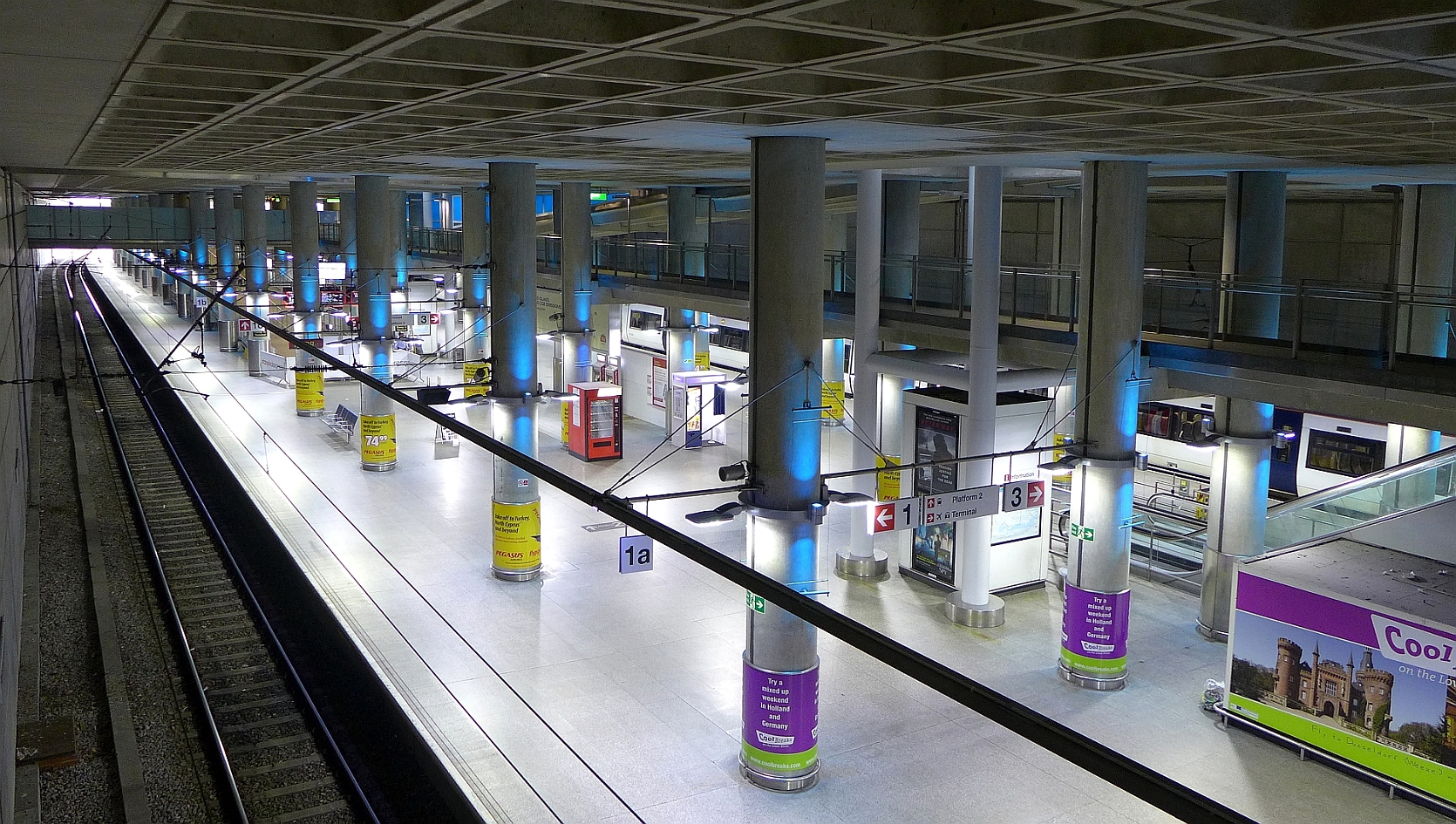
Stansted Airport railway station in 2014

=== Trains ===
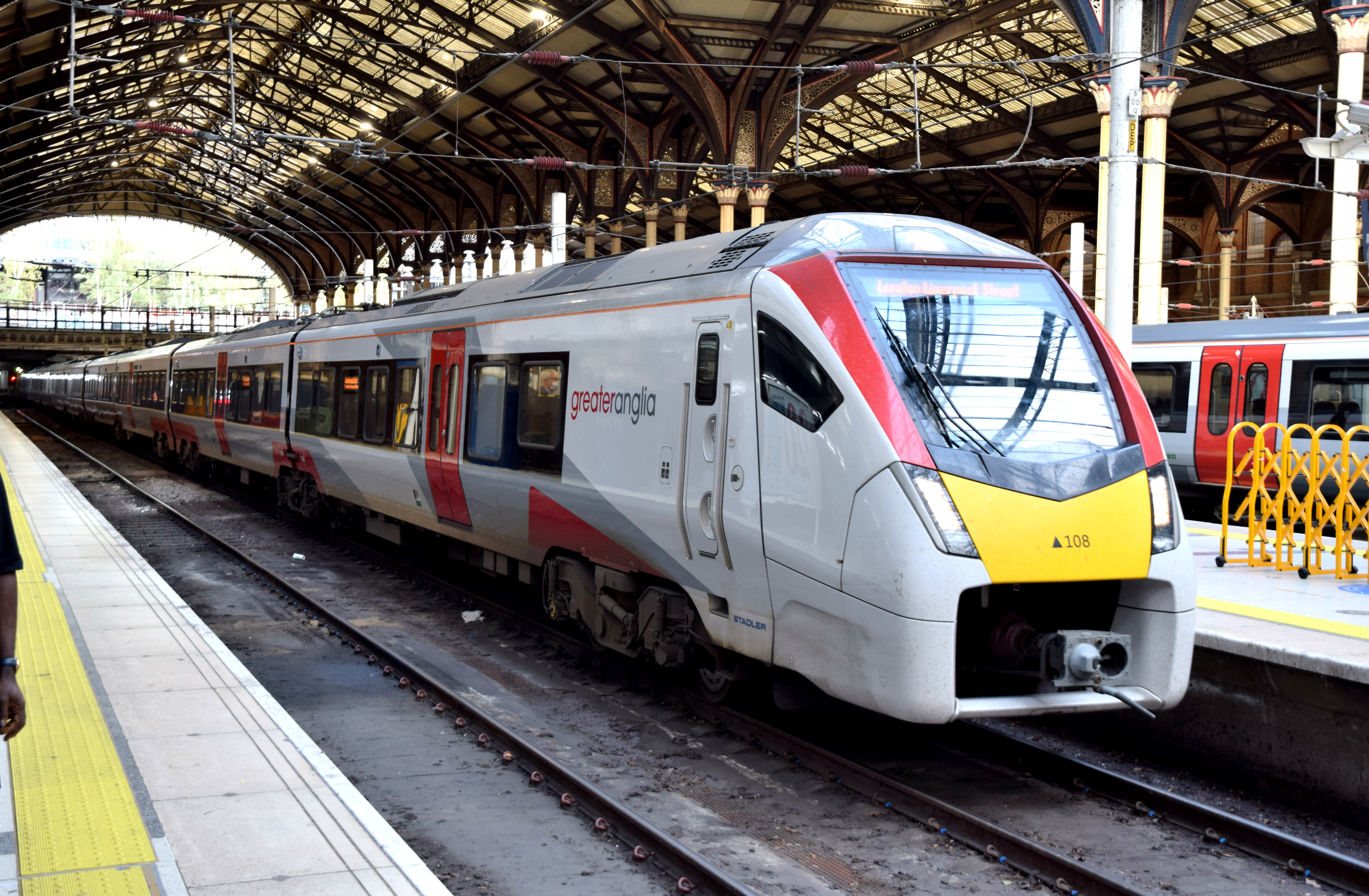
A Class 745 train operating the Stansted Express at London Liverpool Street

Stansted Airport railway station is situated in the terminal building directly below the main concourse.

Services to London are on the Stansted Express train to and from Liverpool Street in Central London. This service operates every 15 minutes and the usual journey time is between 45 and 53 minutes. Liverpool Street is served by London Underground and the Elizabeth line, offering access throughout London. The Stansted Express also calls at Tottenham Hale, for the Underground's Victoria line and connections to various destinations in North London and the West End. Some Stansted Express services also call at Stansted Mountfitchet, Bishop's Stortford and/or Harlow Town en route to London Liverpool Street.

CrossCountry operates an hourly service from the airport to Birmingham New Street, via Cambridge, Peterborough and Leicester. Greater Anglia operates services to Norwich via Cambridge.

=== Buses and coaches ===
Scheduled express bus or coach services which run to and from London are provided by National Express and Flibco. The bus station is next to the terminal building.

National Express also runs direct coach services to the airport from Luton Airport and Heathrow, and additionally from Birmingham, Oxford, Norwich, and Cambridge.

Essex Airlink and First Essex operate services to Southend-on-Sea, Chelmsford, London Southend Airport, Colchester, Braintree and Basildon.

Local bus services operate to nearby communities.

=== Roads ===
Stansted is connected to northeast London and Cambridge by the M11 motorway and to Braintree, Colchester, and Harwich by the A120, which is dual-carriageway until Braintree. The road distance to London is 37 miles (60 km).

As of October 1996, the airport has 2,500 short-stay parking spaces within walking distance to the terminal. In addition, as of the same month, the airport has over 8,000 long-stay spaces located near the M11 motorway and A120 junction. A courtesy bus service links the long-stay spaces to the terminal. The airport also offers mid-stay parking, closer to the terminal than its long-stay spaces. Stansted Airport also offers valet parking and a meet-and-greet service, which is similar to valet, but marketed more at the leisure-traveller market; both are run from the short-stay car park.

== Incidents and accidents ==
Stansted has been designated by the UK government as its preferred airport for any hijacked planes requesting to land in the UK. This is because its design allows a hijacked airliner to be isolated well away from any terminal buildings or runways, allowing the airport to continue to operate while negotiations are carried out, or even while an assault or rescue mission is undertaken. For this reason, Stansted has been involved in more hijack incidents than might be expected for an airport of its size.

- On 30 April 1956, a Scottish Airlines Avro 685 York C.1 suffered a runway excursion during a rejected takeoff, winding up in a drain on the side of the runway, collapsing the undercarriage. Two passengers died out of 54 on board.
- On 23 December 1957, a Scottish Airlines Avro 685 York C.1, a cargo flight, crashed on its third approach to Stansted striking a tree three quarters of a mile short of the runway, crashing in flames. All four occupants died.
- On 27 February 1982, an Air Tanzania Boeing 737-2R8C landed at the airport after having been hijacked on an internal flight from Mwanza to Dar es Salaam and flown to the UK via Nairobi, Jeddah, and Athens, where two passengers had been released. The hijackers demanded to speak to exiled Tanzanian opposition politician Oscar Kambona. This request was granted, and after 26 hours on the ground, the hijackers surrendered and the passengers were released.
- On 30 March 1998, an Emerald Airways Hawker Siddeley HS 748 carrying the Leeds United F.C. was brought down immediately after takeoff when its starboard engine exploded. 40 passengers were onboard (18 from the Leeds team). Only two passengers were injured.
- On 22 December 1999, Korean Air Cargo Flight 8509, a Boeing 747-200F, crashed shortly after take-off from the airfield due to pilot error. The only people on board at the time were the aircrew, and all four were killed. The aircraft crashed in Hatfield Forest near the village of Great Hallingbury.
- On 6 February 2000, an Ariana Afghan Airlines Boeing 727 with 156 people on board was hijacked and flown – stopping at Tashkent, Kazakhstan, and Moscow – to Stansted Airport. After a four-day stand-off, the hostages on board were safely freed and the incident ended peacefully. The motive behind the hijack was to gain asylum in the UK, sparking another debate about immigration into the country. A large number of passengers on board the plane also applied for asylum. The remainder returned to Afghanistan. Nine hijackers were jailed, but their convictions for hijacking were quashed for misdirection of the jury in 2003, and in July 2004, a court ruled that they could not be deported from the UK.
- On 24 May 2013, Pakistan International Airlines Flight 709 from Lahore, Pakistan, was escorted by RAF Typhoons after being diverted from Manchester Airport due to an onboard threat. Two men were charged with endangering an aircraft.
- On 21 September 2013, SriLankan Airlines Flight UL503 inbound to Heathrow was escorted by RAF Typhoons to Stansted Airport after being diverted. Two men were detained for endangering an aircraft, and one was formally arrested.

=== Protest incidents ===
- In 2008, 57 people were arrested after Plane Stupid, an environmental activist group, broke through the barriers and created a "stockade" on a taxiway, which resulted in 52 flights being cancelled.
- In March 2018, a group of activists delayed a deportation flight to Nigeria. Fifteen of the protestors were found guilty of "intentional disruption of services at an aerodrome", under the Aviation and Maritime Security Act 1990. This verdict on the Stansted 15 was described in New Statesman as having a chilling effect on public dissent.

== See also ==
- List of airports in the United Kingdom and the British Crown Dependencies
- Airports of London
- List of Royal Air Force stations
