= Chelmsford Park and Ride =

Bus service in Essex, England

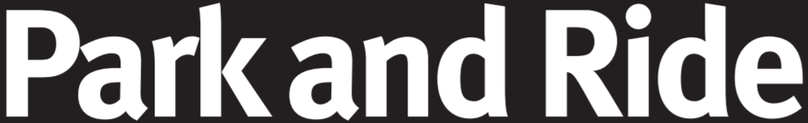

Overview
- Operator: First Essex
- Vehicle: Alexander Dennis Enviro400 MMC
- Former operator: Central Connect
- Timetable: Sandon; Chelmer Valley

Chelmsford Park and Ride is a park and ride bus service operated by First Essex on behalf of Essex County Council with a commercial service by Central Connect routes are operated serving two park and ride sites in Sandon and Chelmer Valley.

== History ==
The service was previously operated by First Essex for 15 years from opening until 5 March 2022. On 7 March 2022 operations were taken over by Central Connect on a 4 year tender. The service was suspended on 28 March 2020 due to the COVID-19 pandemic. The Sandon service resumed on 6 July 2020 with an every 15 minute circular service and Chelmer Valley on 3 August 2020 with an every 30 minute service.

Since 6th March 2026, First Essex were re-contracted to operate the now 700 (previously 701) and 702, however the Saturday 702 service was withdrawn due 'Very low usage', and Central Connect continue operating the 701 as a commercial service until 28th November 2026 when it will cease.

=== Park and Ride Sites ===
Currently there are two park and ride sites in Chelmsford. One in Sandon southeast of the city and another in Chelmer Valley to the north of the city. During the COVID-19 pandemic Chelmer Valley Park and Ride Site was planned to be used as a temporary mortuary, but this did not happen in the end.

== Services ==
Three services are operated, Sandon Circular & Chelmer Valley Circular.

Route	Site	Operating Hours	Frequency
702	Sandon	Monday to Friday; 06:30 - 19:45	Every 10 Minutes - Peak; Every 15 Minutes - Off Peak
700 (First) & 701 (Central Connect)	Chelmer Valley	Monday to Friday; 06:30 – 21:30	Every 10 Minutes - Peak; Every 20 Minutes - Off Peak
700 (First) & 701 (Central Connect)	Chelmer Valley	Saturday; 07:00 – 20:30	Every 20 Minutes

== Vehicles ==
First Essex use a fleet of 6 Alexander Dennis Enviro400 MMC buses on services 700 and 702, Central Connect use 4 Alexander Dennis Enviro200 MMC buses on service 701.

All vehicles are in a plain black livery with Park & Ride branding.
