= Central Connect =

Central Connect may refer to:

- Central Connect Airlines
- Diamond West Midlands
- UK based independent bus group Transport Made Simple, owners of Central Connect, Simonds, and Flagfinders, as well as of Go East Anglia as of October 2025.
