= Arriva Colchester =

British bus operating company

- Parent: Arriva
- Founded: 2004
- Headquarters: Whitehall Industrial Estate, Colchester
- Service area: Essex
- Service type: Bus services
- Routes: 4
- Fleet: 28
- Fuel type: Diesel
- Operator: Arriva Southern Counties
- Website: Arriva Colchester

Arriva Colchester (formerly Network Colchester) is a bus company operating services around Colchester. It is a subsidiary of Arriva. The company was, until March 2015, part of the Tellings-Golden Miller company, which was owned by Arriva at the time, under the name of Network Colchester. In October 2026, Arriva announced plans to sell their Colchester depot, fleet and assets to First Bus.

== History ==
Network Colchester logo used until March 2015

Network Colchester's origins can be traced to 1904 with the establishment of Colchester Corporation Tramways, operating at its peak, four routes and 18 trams. Bus operation commenced in 1928 as Colchester Corporation Transport to replace the trams. To comply with the Transport Act 1985 in 1986 the assets were transferred to a new legal entity, Colchester Borough Transport.

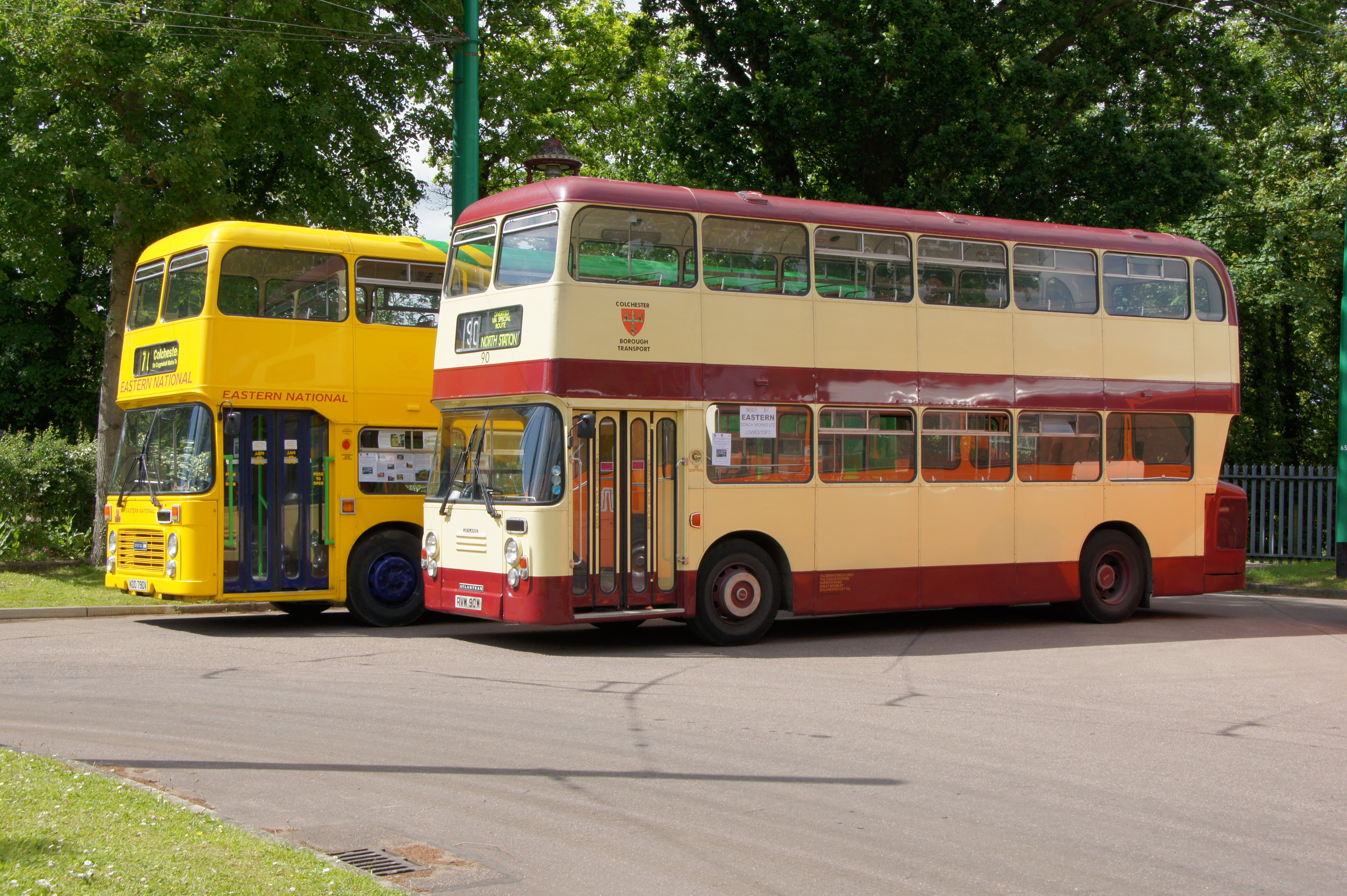
Colchester Borough Transport 1980 Leyland bus (right) at the 2012 East Anglia Transport Museum bus rally

In 1993, during a bus war with Eastern National, the company was sold to British Bus for £1, but the new owners took on considerable debts. After discussions the bus war ended in 1994 with a share out of routes between the two companies. In August 1996 British Bus was purchased by the Cowie Group, which in November 1997 was renamed Arriva, with Colchester Borough Transport being rebranded as Arriva Colchester. The tuscan red and cream livery was replaced by Arriva corporate colours. Profits did not improve and in 2004 the company was sold to Tellings-Golden Miller, placed under the control of Burton's Coaches and rebranded as Network Colchester.

In 2008 Tellings-Golden Miller was sold to Arriva resulting in it once again owning the Colchester services. It continues to trade as Network Colchester. In early 2010 the Burton's Coaches business was sold to Yellow Star Travel Services in a management buy out but ownership of Network Colchester remained with Tellings-Golden Miller.

On 12 October 2026, following a detailed review of its operations, Arriva announced the sale of its Colchester bus depot, along with the fleet and assets to First Bus, with its final services due to operate on 19 December 2026.

== Depots ==
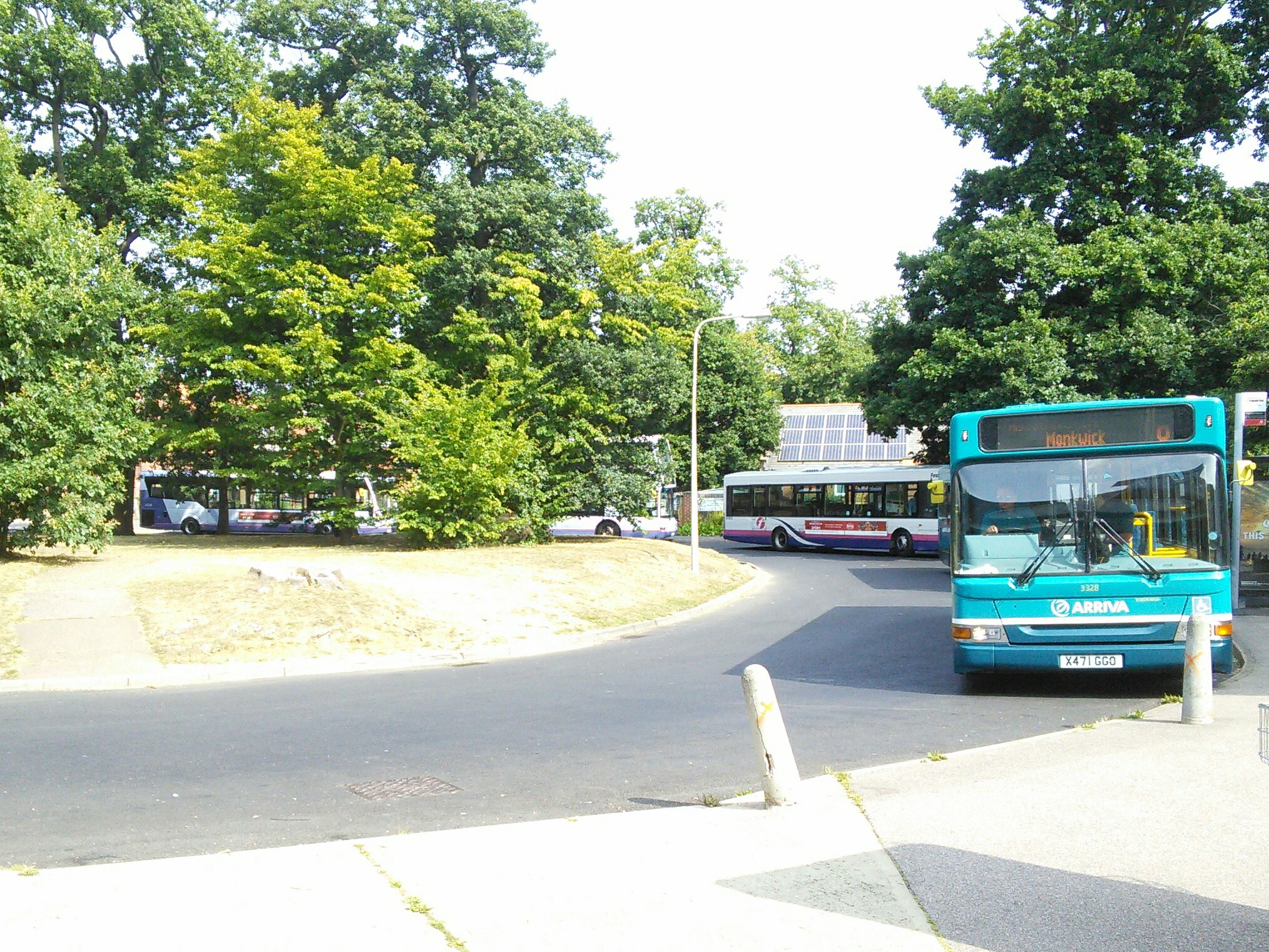
Arriva Dennis Dart at route the terminus of route 8 (Monkwick - Highwoods Square), alongside local competitor First.

The depot was at Magdalen Street, Colchester until March 2008 when relocated to expanded premises at Heath Business Park, Grange Way in the Old Heath district of Colchester. The depot was later used by First Essex, but in November 2018 sold for redevelopment.

== Routes ==
As of November 2026, Arriva operates the following routes in Colchester:

- 1: Shrub End - Greenstead
- 2: Horkesley Heath - Highwoods
- 3: Colchester - Greenstead
- 8: Highwoods - Monkwick

== Fleet ==
As of September 2026, the fleet consists of:

- Double Deckers (4): ADL Enviro400 (2), VDL DB300 Wright Gemini 2 (1), Volvo B7TL Wright Eclipse Gemini (1).
- Single Deckers (24): ADL Enviro200 (11), ADL Enviro200 MMC (4), Dennis Dart SLF Caetano Nimbus (1), VDL SB200 Wright Pulsar (2), VDL SB200 Wright Pulsar 2 (4), Volvo B7RLE Wright Eclipse 2 (2).
