= First Essex =

Bus operator in Essex, England

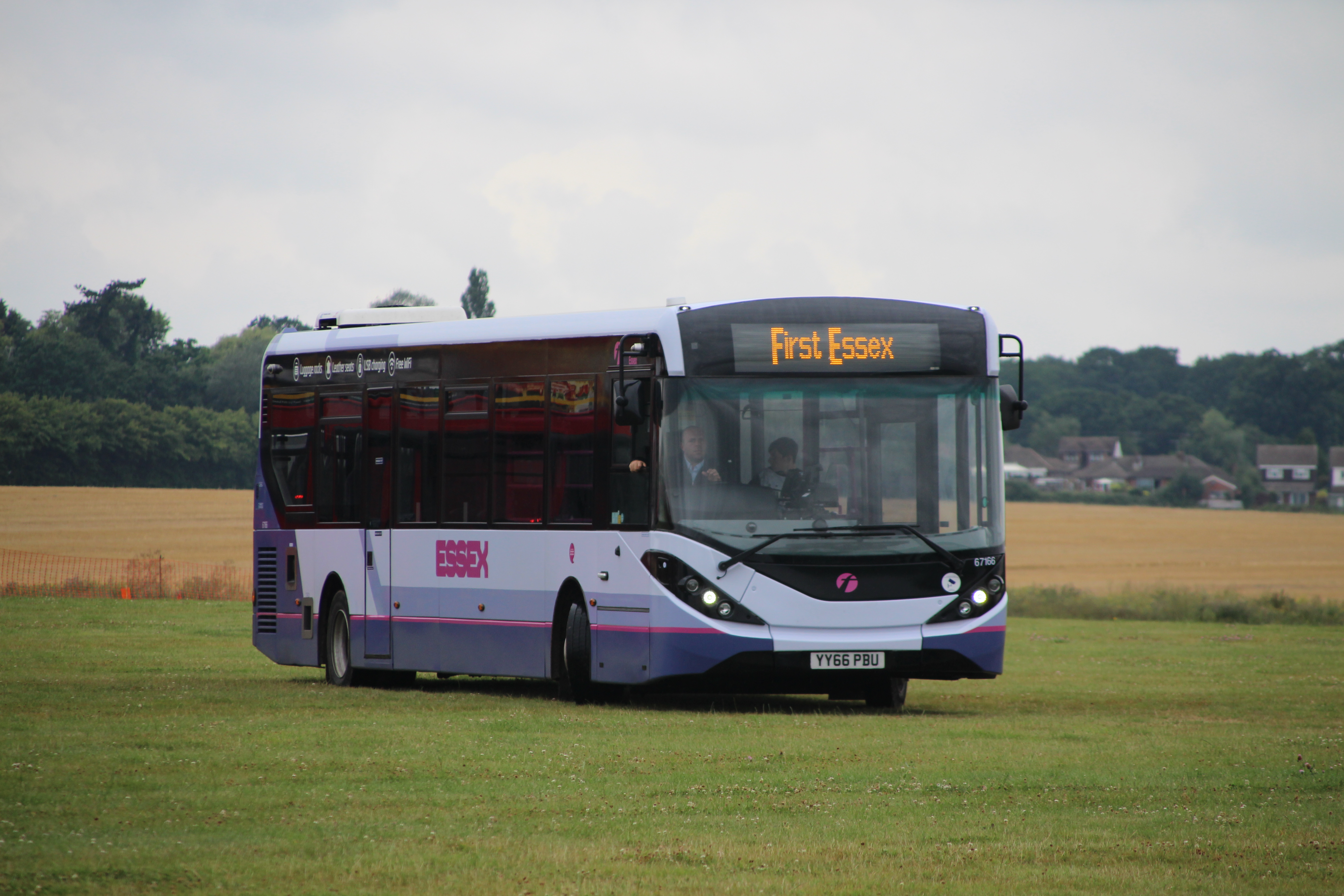
- An Alexander Dennis Enviro 200 MMC at the Essex Bus Rally (2019)
- Parent: FirstGroup
- Headquarters: Chelmsford
- Service area: Essex
- Service type: Bus
- Routes: 104 (Sept 2026)
- Hubs: Basildon, Chelmsford, Colchester, Hadleigh
- Depots: 4
- Fleet: 316 (Sept 2026)
- Website: firstbus.co.uk/essex

First Essex is a bus company that operates services in the county of Essex, England. It is a subsidiary of FirstGroup, the British multi-national transport group and a leading private sector provider of public transport services.

== History ==
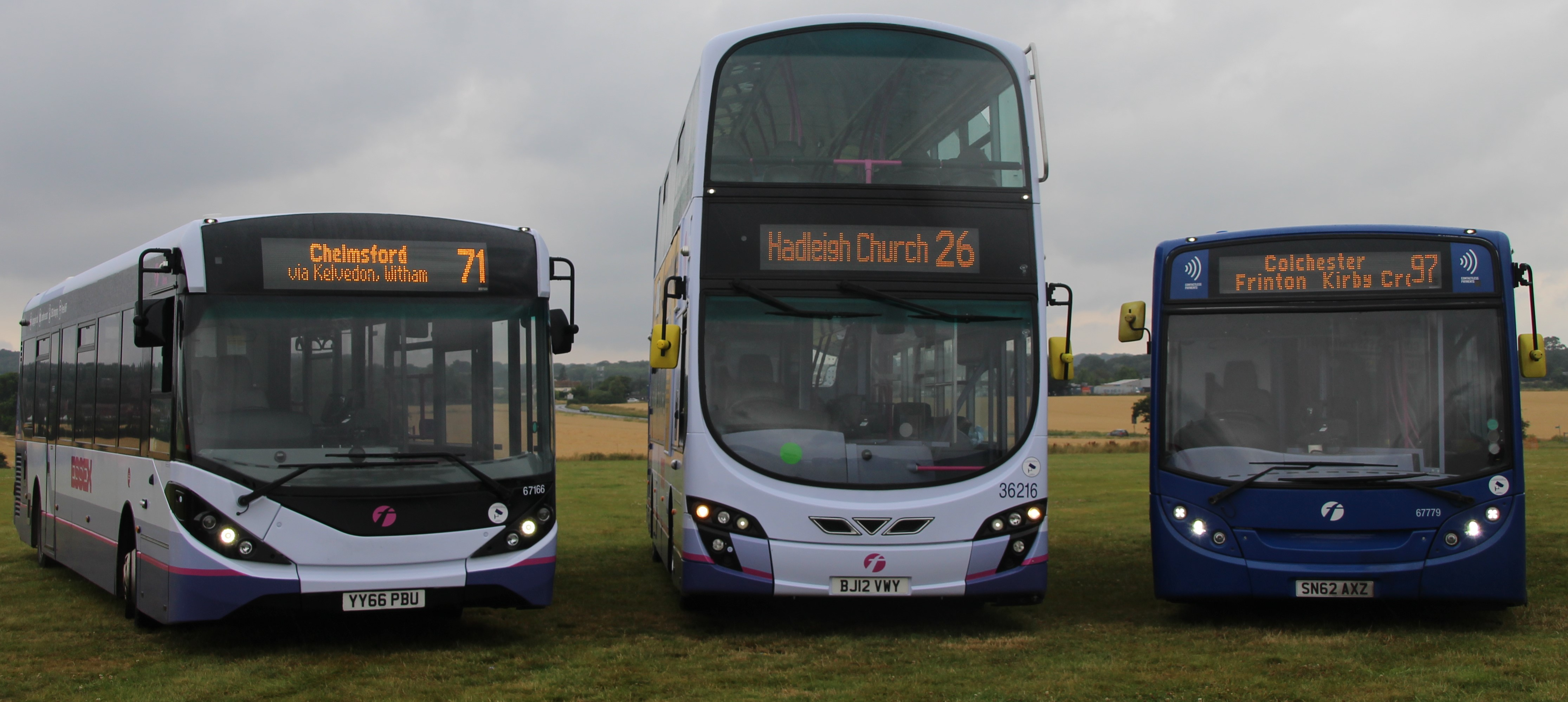
An Alexander Dennis Enviro 200 MMC, a Volvo B9TL/Wright Eclipse Gemini 2 and an Alexander Dennis Enviro 300 at the Essex Bus Rally (2019)

Eastern National was the dominant bus company that operated in Essex from 1929 to 1995. It was nationalised in 1949 and became part of the National Bus Company in 1969. It was later privatised in a management buyout in October 1986. In April 1990, Eastern National was acquired by Badgerline, which divided the company into two brands: Thamesway in the south of Essex and LRT tendered routes; with the Eastern National name retained for operations in north Essex and south-east Hertfordshire.

The two companies were included in the June 1995 merger of Badgerline with GRT Group to form FirstBus, which then recombined the two operations and renamed the company First Essex. Little changed initially for passengers but, gradually over the next decade, First introduced its nationwide corporate branding which eventually led to the demise of the Eastern National and Thamesway names.

First Essex was criticised by passengers and members of the Southend Area Bus Users' Group for withdrawing services which it considered no longer economically viable when Southend Borough Council withdrew bus subsidies as part of budget cuts in 2005. First said it was due to low passenger numbers, even when parts of the route were profitable. Further criticism came from passengers when First Essex and Arriva Southend decided to withdraw their Day Rover ticket, which allowed unlimited journeys on the day of purchase on buses operated by both companies, regardless of which issued the ticket; as a result, their day rovers could only be used on the buses of the company that issued them. They replaced it with a more expensive Octopus ticket, which can be used on any service buses in the general Southend area.

In March 2023, FirstGroup purchased Ensignbus, which ran bus services in Essex, as well as a vehicle refurbishment and resale operation. It was expected that its bus service operations would remain separate from those of First Essex. At the time of acquisition, Ensignbus had a young vehicle fleet of 55 buses.

== Depots ==
First Essex operates four bus depots in the cities of Chelmsford and Colchester, and the towns of Basildon and Hadleigh:

=== Basildon (BN) ===
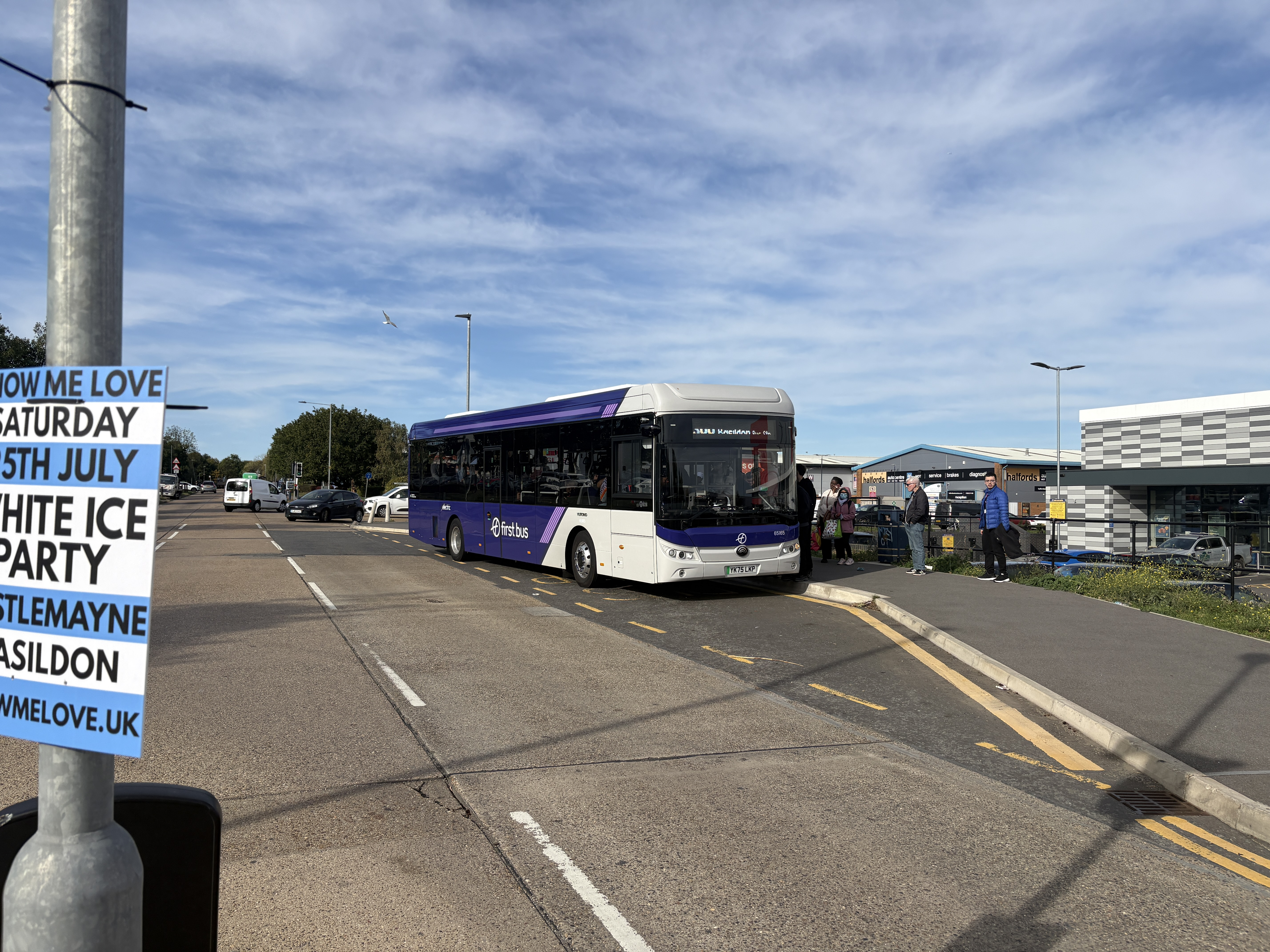
A new Yutong E12 (65165) at Pipps Hill, operating a 300 service (2025)

The depot is located on Cherrydown East, near to Basildon railway station. It was opened by Eastern National in 1961 to replace premises at Bull Road, in Vange.

After Brentwood's North Road depot closed in 1995, its operations transferred to Basildon. In 1998, when they were transferred to Harold Wood depot; when First London took over that operation in 2004, Basildon again took on the Brentwood town services until 2012, when Chelmsford acquired them.

In 2012, FirstGroup ordered 19 Volvo 7900 during Bus Expo, using the Green Bus Fund; it took delivery of the buses in March 2013. These vehicles operated originally on route 100 between Lakeside Shopping Centre and Chelmsford.

In April 2022, First Essex reorganised its local routes with the introduction of the Basildon Shuttles brand; a ceremony was held on 21 April 2022.

A £30.6 million project was undertaken to become Essex's first fully electric depot, with funding provided by the ZEBRA-2 scheme (£4.8 million) and First Group (£25.8 million). The garage has since been fitted with electrical gantries using 360 kWh chargers and Heilox Flex 180 units around the site. Completed in summer 2025, with capacity to store 78 electric vehicles (EVs), this converted the depot from diesel to electric power. As a result, 55 new electric buses (Note: This consisted of 31 Yutong E12 single deck buses and 24 UDD11 double deckers.) were bought by FirstGroup in July 2024, as part of a larger country-wide deal of 169 buses. The new electric buses came into service in September 2025 and operate on the majority of routes. In addition, seven Wright StreetDecks were re-engined to NewPower EVs.

As of 2026, Basildon depot operates 17 routes using the Basildon Shuttles and First Essex brands. (Note: Basildon-operated routes are: B1, B2/E, B3, B4, B5, B6, 1A, X10 Essex Airlink*, 22*, 25, 100, 200, 201, 300, 561* and 825 (* routes operated jointly with other depots.))

=== Chelmsford (CF) ===
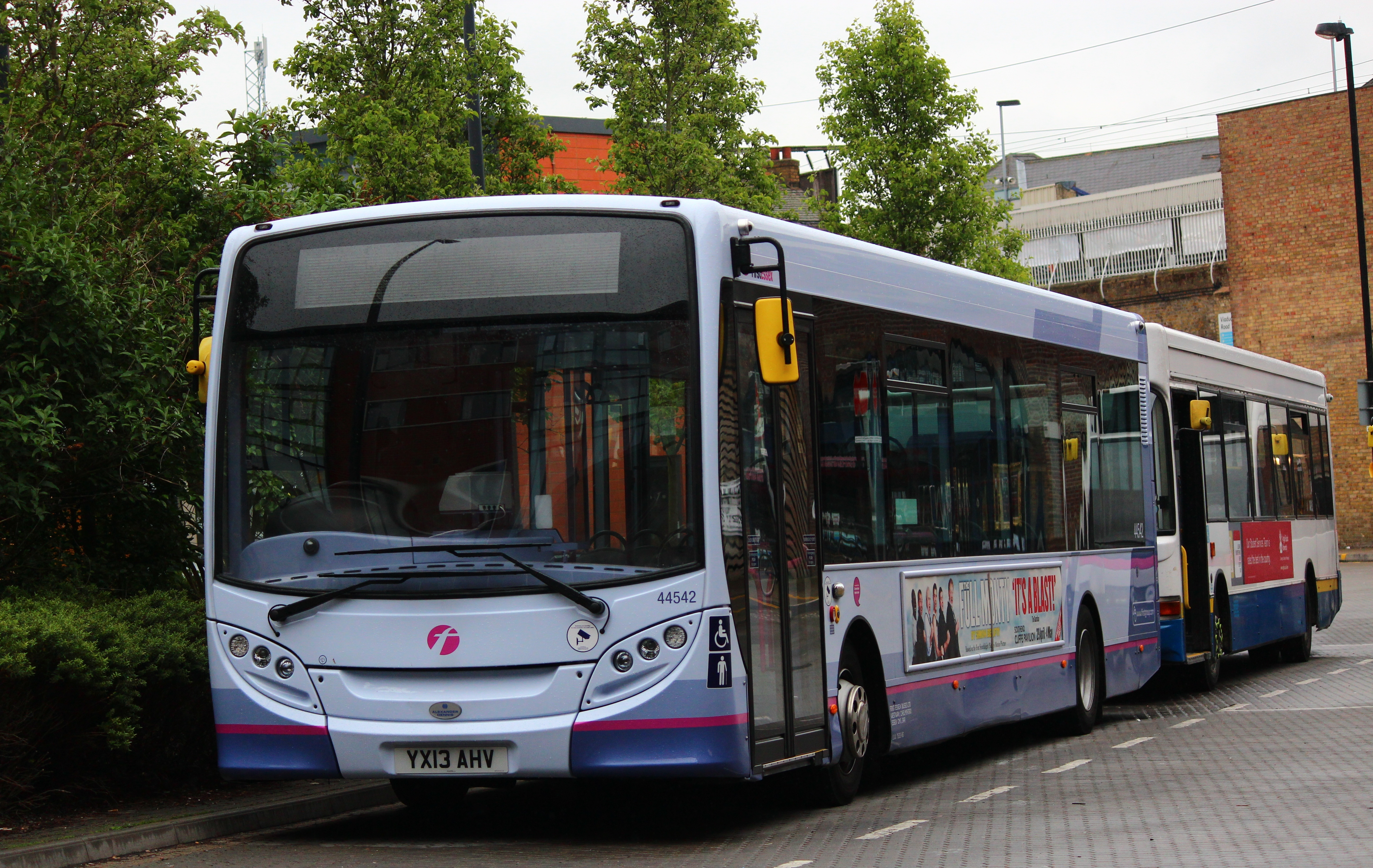
An Alexander Dennis Enviro 200 in Chelmsford (2013)

The 1930s Duke Street bus station and maintenance facility was demolished in autumn 2004; the main company depot was, until then, based on the edge of the town at New Writtle Street. Operations moved subsequently to a new site at Westway. The Duke Street site was redeveloped with flats, with a new and much-reduced bus station opening in March 2007.

Chelmsford had outstations at Great Dunmow (DW) and Maldon (MN) until 2004; the latter had previously been a full depot until 1993.

From its opening in 2007, the depot had been the operator of the Chelmsford Park and Ride service; the contract was lost to Vectare (Central Connect) in 2022. The service has since returned back to First Essex in March 2026, due to "very low usage" according to Essex County Council.

In August 2025, Essex County Council announced plans to cut the £11 million funding it provides to maintain 41 mostly rural routes; it was not clear if First would be able to maintain them if the proposals go ahead. A public consultation was launched on the proposals, to run until October 2025. The results of the consultation were published in January 2026: some services would continue unchanged, some would continue with revised timetables or redesigned routes, and a small number of services will move to a three-week on‑bus withdrawal consultation to gather final passenger comments.

As of 2026, Chelmsford depot operates 51 routes using the Chelmsford Shuttles, Essex Airlink and First Essex brands. (Note: Chelmsford routes: C1, C2/E, C3, C5, C6, C7/E, C8, C9, C10, C12, C57, 3*, 4, X10 Essex Airlink*, 13/A/B, 19A, X30 Essex Airlink, 31, 37, 42A, 46, 47, 59, 70, X70, 71*, X71, 73/A/B, 80A/C, 170, 331, 332, 333, 336, 351, 370, 371*, 375, 561*, 570, 620, 625, 700 and 702 (* routes operated jointly with other depots).)

=== Colchester (CR) ===
The depot is located in Quayside and was built in 2016 to replace the former site on Queen Street, which was on the site of the Theatre Royal that burned down circa 1917. Buses were kept in the old Colchester Corporation tram shed at Magdalen Street after it was vacated by Arriva Colchester in 2006; this ceased in July 2009 when the yard next door was used instead. First had another Colchester site at Haven Road, which was mainly used for engineering; this has since been bought by a local non-transport company in 2015.

Until 1969, Eastern National had an outstation in Victoria Place, Brightlingsea, which was acquired with the business of Berry & Sons in 1937. Until 1973, there was also an outstation at West Mersea, acquired from Primrose Bus Service in 1935. The building is extant, but it was heavily modified to become part of a new leisure centre in 1979. Service buses still terminate outside and locals still refer to it as "West Mersea bus station".

Colchester depot operates 32 routes under the Colchester Shuttles, Essex Airlink and First Essex brands. (Note: Colchester-operated routes: 1A, 2A, 16A, X20 Essex Airlink, 50/A/B, 51, 52, 53/A, 54, 55, 56, 57, 67, 68/A, 69/A, 71*, X71, 75, 79, 85, 87, 88/A, 92, 102, 104, 320, 371*, 375, 694 and Z75 (* routes are operated jointly with Chelmsford).)

=== Hadleigh (HH) ===
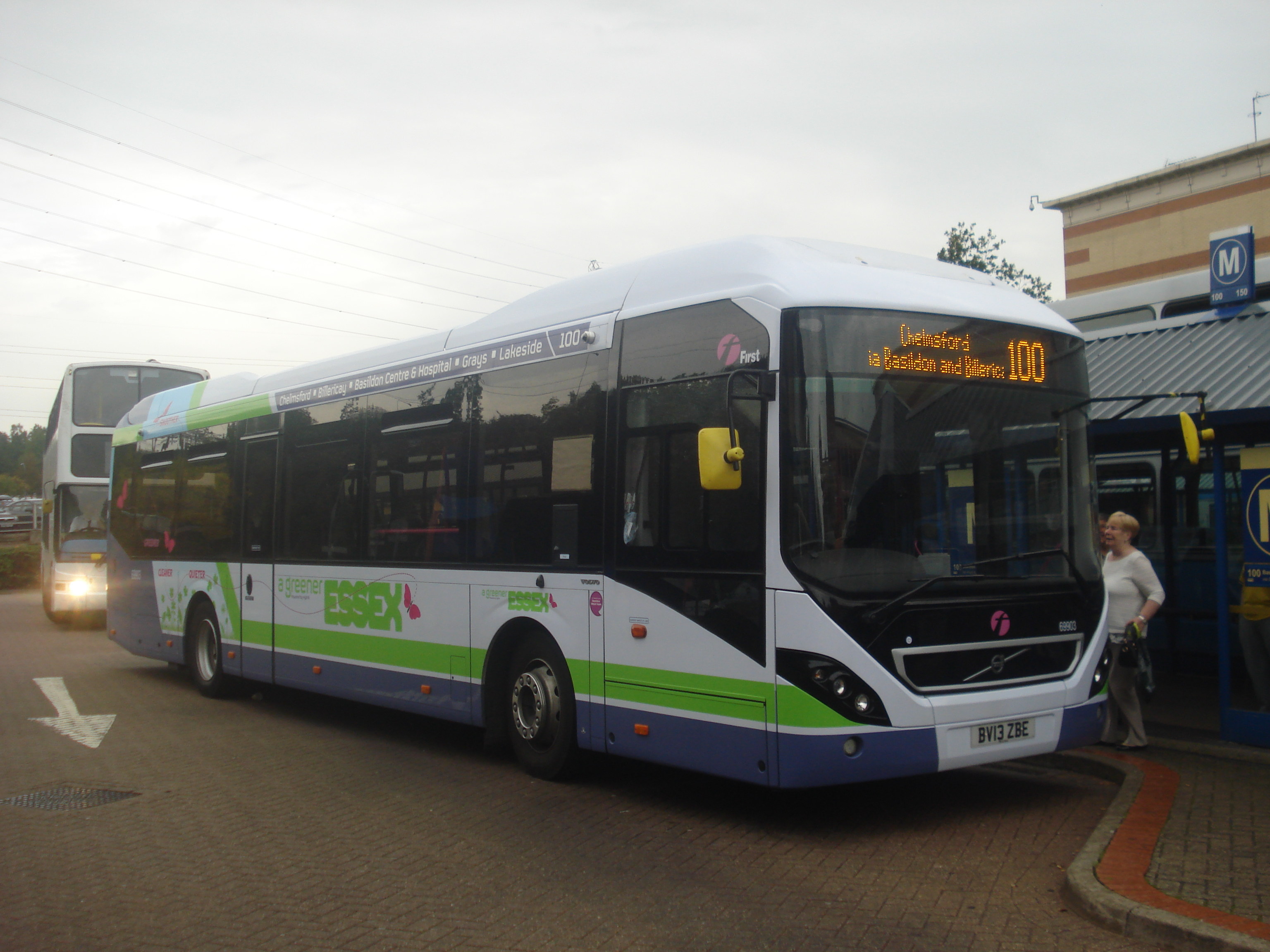
A Volvo 7900 hybrid at Lakeside Shopping Centre (2013)

Hadleigh garage is located on London Road, off a roundabout just west of Hadleigh shopping centre. It is a former Westcliff-on-Sea Motor Services facility, which was controlled by Eastern National from 1955. It took on the work of Canvey (CY) depot in April 1978, upon its closure, which has since become a transport museum. It expanded its operations further in 1992, after Southend Prittlewell (PL) depot was closed; its predecessor, Southend (SD) depot on London Road, was closed in 1987 and the site is now used by a Sainsbury's supermarket.

As of 2026, Hadleigh depot operates 14 routes, using the Essex Bus and First Essex brands. (Note: Hadleigh-operated routes: 3*, 4/A, 20/S, 21/C/S, 22*, 26, 27, 28, X30 and 827 (* routes operated jointly with other depots).) An hourly night service to Basildon on route 28 was introduced in June 2026, alongside the X30 to Chelmsford and Stansted Airport.

== Former depots ==
=== Braintree (BE) ===
Braintree depot was first located at the long-standing premises on Fairfield Road, in the town centre, which had first been used by Hicks Brothers, a bus operator that Eastern National acquired in 1949. It became an outstation of Chelmsford, consisting of a secure yard and portakabin; a house adjacent to the old depot site is extant. There were vehicle washing and fuelling facilities, but heavy maintenance was done at Chelmsford. The portacabin had previously been at the Maldon outstation that was closed in 2004. The site was redeveloped for retail/residential use upon its closure in 2005.

In 2009, First reopened a full depot in Braintree, behind the secure yard in Springwood Drive. This contained washing/fuelling facilities and heavy maintenance facilities, while the secure yard housed the depot's reserve fleet. It was closed in late 2015; its services are now either operated by Stephensons of Essex (Note: Routes: 21, 30, 131 and 132 (since renumbered 38/38A).) or by Chelmsford depot. (Note: Routes 70 and 352.) At this time of its closure, it operated 13 routes. (Note: Braintree-operated routes: 17, 21/A, 30, X32, 70, 131, 132, 302, 306, 318, 347 and yellow school bus service 509.)

=== Clacton (CN) ===
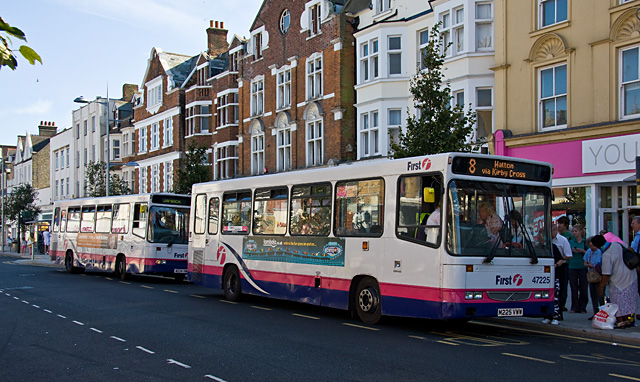
An Alexander Dash-bodied Dennis Dart in Clacton-on-Sea (2009)

Clacton depot was sited at Castle Road, near to the town centre, which was redeveloped as flats. Upon acquisition of Coastal Red in 1988, a one-time competitor on the Tendring peninsular, Telford Road became the depot location, on the Gorse Lane industrial estate. The depot was closed on 28 July 2018. At the time of its closure, Clacton depot operated 18 routes. (Note: Clacton-operated routes: 5/B, 7/X, 8, 10, 11, 12, 17, 18, 74, 76 and former Harwich depot routes 3, 4, 20/A and 22A/B.)

There was an outstation of Clacton at Walton-on-the-Naze (WN) until May 1996. This was a small garage at Kino Road, just off the sea front, which housed four vehicles. It was demolished in 1998, with bungalows built on the site; however, the enquiry office survives as a gift shop. The predecessor of Walton garage was the extant Warners Iron Foundry at Naze Park Road, which had origins with Silver Queen.

=== Great Dunmow (DW) ===
This was an outstation of Braintree. It was first closed in 2004 but reopened in 2008, after the new Chelmsford depot opened. It was located on the premises of Dons Coaches and operated one route, (Note: The route 33 to Chelmsford.) which was transferred to Chelmsford upon its final closure.

=== Harwich (DT) ===
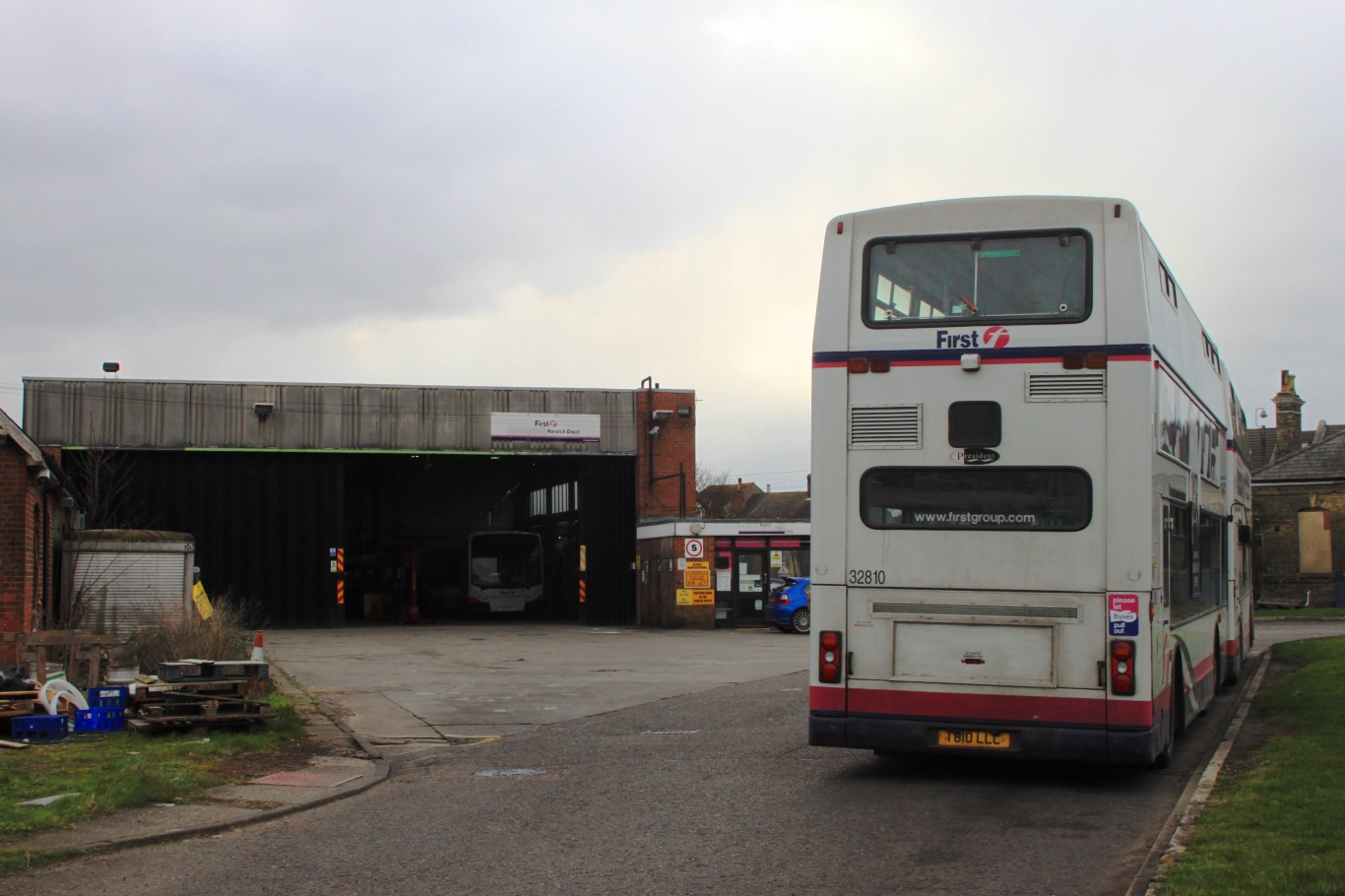
Harwich garage (2013)

A depot at Harwich bus station, off Main Road, was opened by Eastern National in 1974. It replaced the old Dovercourt (DT) depot at Kingsway, which is now used as a public library.

The depot was closed in December 2013, although First Essex continued to use the site for a period afterwards to park buses overnight for the early morning 103/104 services; buses now return to Colchester depot at night. Upon closure, it operated ten routes. (Note: Harwich-operated routes: 3, 4, 20/A, 22A/B, 103, 104 and school services 193 & C30; services 3, 4, 20/A, 22A/B were transferred to Clacton depot and 103/4 are now operated from Colchester.)
