= Green Line routes X1 and X10 =

X1 & X10
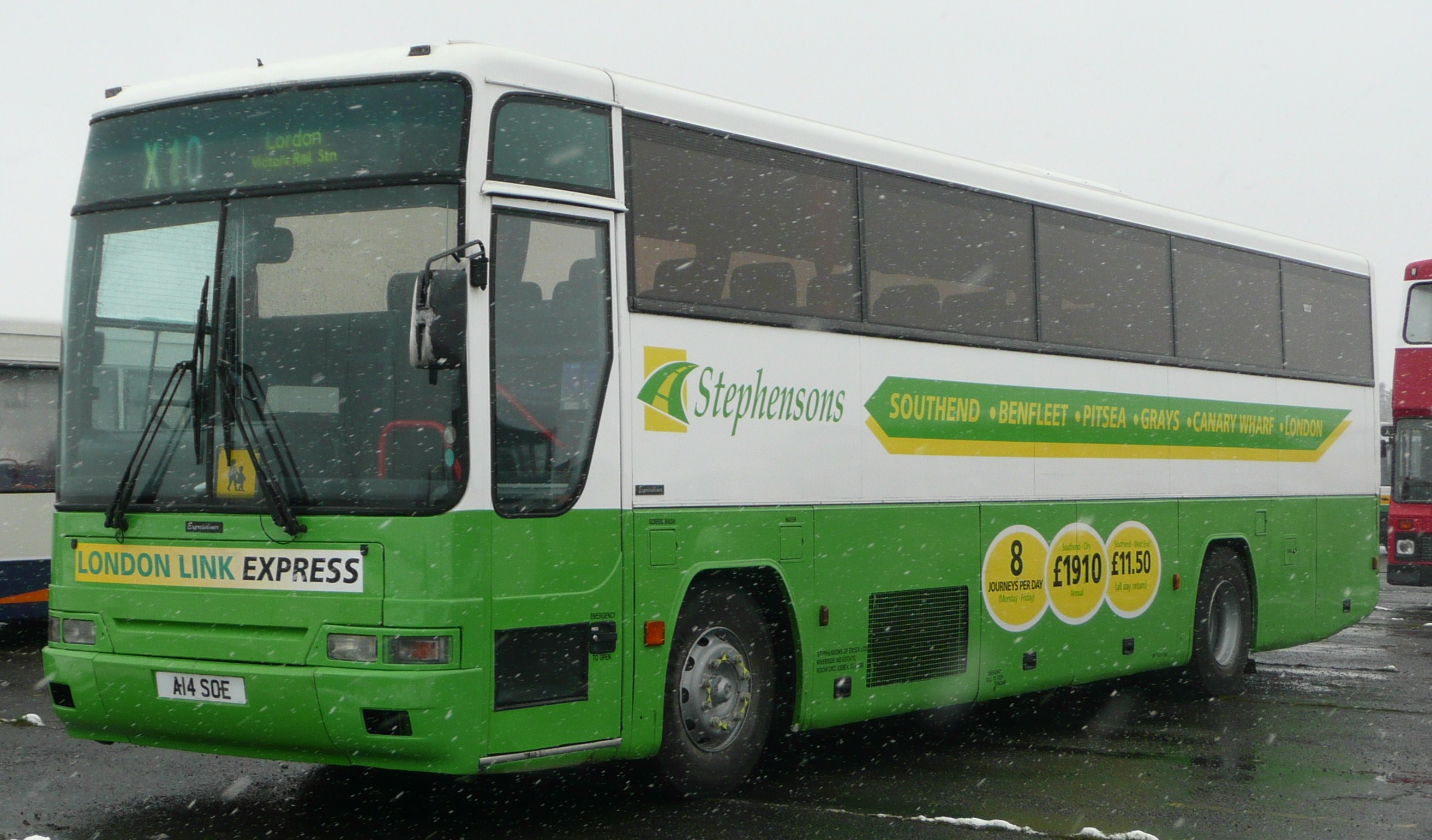
- Stephensons of Essex Plaxton Premiere bodied Volvo B10M in April 2008

Overview
- System: Green Line
- Operator: Stephensons of Essex
- Garage: Rochford

Route
- Start: Harlow
- Via: Southend; Benfleet; Dagenham
- End: London
- Length: 30 miles (48 km)

Green Line routes X1 and X10 were limited-stop express coach services which were operated by Stephensons of Essex as part of the Green Line Coaches network. The services operated between Rochford, Southend and London. The original X1 route was introduced in 1980 by Southend Transport and Reading Transport, and also served Reading.

== History ==
Route X1 has a very complex history, starting in October 1980.

=== The beginning ===
The UK coach market was deregulated in 1980 under the Transport Act 1980 and the X1 service was started the same year. It ran every two hours between Southend and Reading via Basildon, Socketts Heath, Rainham, Dagenham, East Ham, Canning Town, Aldgate, Piccadilly, Kensington, Hammersmith, Heathrow Airport, Slough, Maidenhead and Twyford, and was jointly operated by Southend Transport and Reading Transport. Southend Transport used four recently delivered Leyland Leopards, and Reading Transport bus seated MCW Metrobuses and MCW Metropolitans.

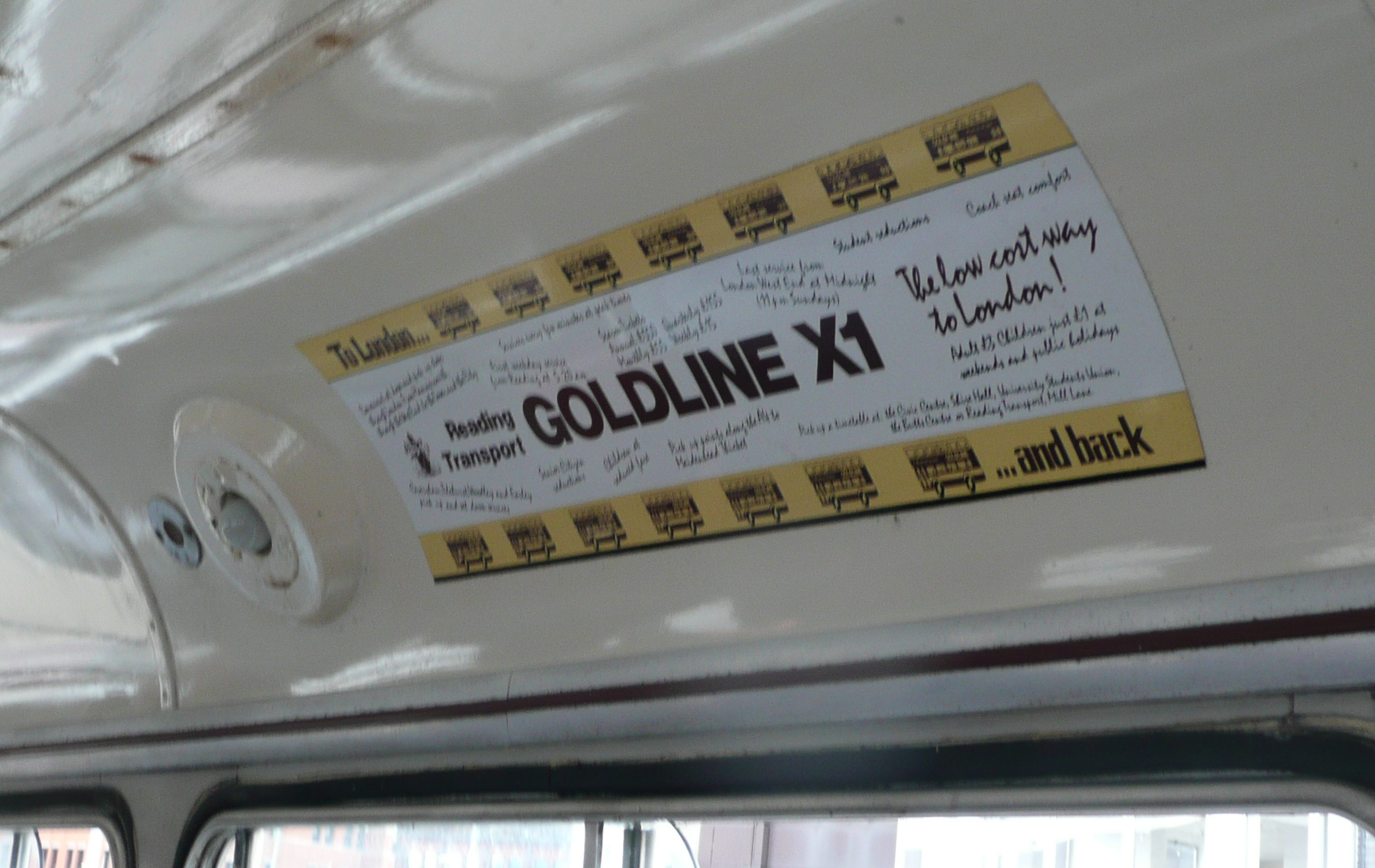
An advert on a preserved Reading Transport bus for the X1.

On 16 February 1981, a licence was granted for a Southend to Hammersmith section of route. At around that time, Reading Transport temporarily withdrew from operating their journeys in a dispute with their staff. Southend Transport operated a reduced service to Heathrow only until it was restored from 23 May. Reading Transport resumed operations on 29 February. Another strike was staged by Reading Transport for 12 days in June that year. On 16 January 1982, a London Bus Agreement was granted by London Transport, meaning more local traffic could be carried. This was in time for a series of rail strikes at the end of January and February, which brought many additional passengers; both operators ran duplicate journeys.

=== Joint operation ended ===
On 16 May 1982, the joint operation ceased. Differences in opinion over revenue allocation and the development of the service resulted in the joint venture ceasing. Reading Transport then operated from Reading to Aldgate, and Southend Transport from Southend to Heathrow, with both routes still numbered X1.

There were more rail strikes in June and July, which resulted in 17 double deck duplicates being used by Southend, some of which were provided by Ensignbus. At the end of July 1982, a Neoplan double deck coach, was tried on the route for a day, and a Bova single deck coach was similarly used on 18 August. However, an order was placed for three Van Hool Astromega double deck coaches.

On 28 November 1982, season tickets - called Expresscards - were introduced, previously only singles, day and period returns were available. Another first time came in December, when the service ran on Christmas Day. In April 1983, the first of the Astromega coaches entered service. It had a seating capacity of 84 seats in a 12m, 3 axle layout.

The first short term hired coach, a Colchester Leopard, was used by Southend on 3 May due to increasing passenger numbers. It was joined by further hired coaches from Leicester from June, Bournemouth and Burnley from October, Fylde in November and Lancaster and Derby from December. In December, there were 13 coaches on hire at the same time. On 9 May, a peak hours only service was introduced, route X21; Shoebury to Green Park via Thorpe Bay, Prittlewell and the A127. June saw two ex Midland Red Willowbrook DP bodied Leopards, enter service on loan from Ensign.

On 15 August 1983, the basic frequency of the route was increased to hourly Mondays to Saturdays and service X21 was enhanced. The end of 1983 and then 1984 saw more increases in passenger numbers, and more frequency increases and vehicle duplications to reflect this. At the beginning to 1984 the short term hired coaches started to be replaced by long term hires. The fleet of coaches reached 20 vehicles, and a parcels service started.

On 15 April there was a major timetable revision, with more peak services bur fewer Heathrow journeys; the Sunday service was increased to hourly. The journeys not via Basildon became numbered X11, and the coach fleet reached 32 vehicles. In the summer of May to September, certain journeys were extended on Sundays to serve attractions such as Thorpe Park and Windsor Castle. Similar extensions were operated in 1985.

18 June 1984 saw an X31 service started from Canvey to Green Park, with 4 return journeys. The coach fleet reached 41 vehicles. On 9 October, the X31 was increased to 7 times a day, Monday to Fridays, increasing the coach fleet to 50. The last short term hired coach was returned to Burnley on 14 January 1985. On 25 January, the coach fleet reached 60, with a new delivery and 6 more on order. At the time, the Southend Transport bus fleet was only 63 vehicles.

On 1 April another peak hour variant started, service X41; it was Prittlewell to Green Park via Rochford, Ashingdon and Rayleigh. At the same time, route X31 was again increased to 9 peak hour journeys and a Saturday trip was introduced. Route numbers X10 and X30 were introduced for peak hour journeys which ran fast from Corringham to Purfleet via the newly opened A13 Socketts Heath by-pass on 22 July 1985.

On 12 April 1986 the Heathrow journeys were extended to the newly opened Terminal 4. From 1 June a relaxation in the licensing laws allowed local traffic to be carried between Southend and Basildon for the first time. On 22 September, route X31 was increased to an hourly service Monday to Fridays with two trips on Saturdays. Four days later, a Cardiff Bus coach-seated Leyland Olympian was taken on long term hire, with five more following in spring 1987.

=== The service at its peak ===
Bus deregulation on 26 October 1986 saw the lifting of the remaining travel restrictions outside London. The service reaches its peak in winter 1986/7, with all services X1, X10, X11, X21, X30, X31 and X41 providing a total of 64 journeys a day, Mondays to Fridays. In the peak, coaches ran every 2½ minutes on average. Six journeys serve Heathrow. The Saturday service provided 20 journeys, with 18 on Sundays and Bank Holidays. The coach fleet stood at 66, exceeding the size of the bus fleet.

An off peak London service X23 was introduced 24 November, East Beckton to Green Park. It was short lived, and was withdrawn in July 1987. On 1 April 1987 an attempt was made to find work for idle commuter coaches, and Southend Transport acquired the Culturebus London sightseeing service 614 from Ensignbus, running every 30 minutes. It was run mainly by the double deckers, Astromegas and Olympians, some of which were painted and lettered for the service.

=== Financial trouble ===
In summer 1987 Southend Transport was hit by a financial crisis, and had heavy losses. The over-expansion of the coach services was blamed, because they carried too many commuter passengers at fares which didn't cover the costs involved. Drastic action was taken to avoid bankruptcy.

In November 1987 Culturebus was reduced to hourly and then on 19 December was sold back to Ensignbus. 21 December saw the off peak services on route X31 withdrawn, although the Saturday journeys remained until March 1988, and the Heathrow service reduced to just 2 journeys. In April 1988 the X31 was cut to only four or five peak journeys; the X41 was also reduced and routes X21 and X30 withdrawn altogether. The Heathrow section was withdrawn, with coaches terminating at Green Park. Many of the hired coaches were soon returned, including the Cardiff Olympians. Two Duple 320 bodied DAFs in build were cancelled.

A limited Heathrow service was reintroduced on 2 October, twice daily Monday to Fridays, following a slightly different route. Some other journeys were also rerouted in London. The Sunday service was reduced to every two hours. In October 1989 "London Coachlink" branding was introduced, with the first vehicle being reliveried in the style in February 1990. Around that time the variation to Canvey was withdrawn but Heathrow service increased to three journeys.

On 14 May 1990 the last of the "off route" peak hour variants, service X41, was withdrawn. Throughout 1990 all six of the Astromegas and all but one Leopard were withdrawn and replaced by Plaxton Paramount bodied Leyland Tigers. On 28 October some off peak journeys were diverted into the new Lakeside Shopping Centre. By the summer, the coach fleet has dropped to 17 vehicles. The routes became branded as Green Line services, however the Green Line livery was not adopted until 1995.

There was a further increase in the number of off peak journeys extended beyond Hyde Park from 25 August, now four in addition to the three Heathrow trips. From that date, the London terminus at Victoria became the Green Line Coach Station rather than Semley Place. More journeys were extended to Victoria on 19 April 1992, and more still the following year, until nearly the entire off peak service went there.

=== Competition ===
On 5 July 1992, Thamesway started up a competing “CitySaver” service, which was mostly timetabled to run just in front of the X1 and with much cheaper season tickets. Competition continued for several years, and in winter 1994 more journeys started to run non stop numbered X10 or X11; more off peak journeys also diverted into Lakeside Shopping Centre, including on Sundays for the first time. The number X3 was introduced for journeys which served both Homesteads and Lakeside. The evening peak journeys started to avoid Aldgate bus station, stopping in Mansell Street instead to avoid the congestion.

Reading Transport's service also faced competition from the recently privatised Beeline company. Reading bought the competing route from Beeline in 1991, but passenger numbers continued to fall, and the route continued to lose money despite several cost-cutting measures in 1998. In May 2000 the route was withdrawn, replaced at peak times by an Armchair Passenger Transport service.

=== Green Line ===
On 1 April 1995 the first X1 leaflet in Green Line house style appeared. The Sunday service was re-routed to run directly from Embankment to Victoria, omitting Piccadilly. In spring of the same year the fleet was partially upgraded with eight second hand Volvo B10Ms replacing some of the Tigers. They introduced the Green Line livery to the fleet and the Tigers soon followed suit.

In September 1996 some morning peak journeys began to run non-stop via the new Limehouse Link instead of the A13. In May 1997, the Heathrow service was withdrawn again, and this time was not reinstated. On 7 September, route number X4 appeared for two morning journeys ex London which did not serve Basildon.

The Southend Transport name was changed to Arriva Southend in 1997. The X4 variant disappeared again and the Piccadilly routing was served only between the peaks Mondays to Fridays, not at all weekends, and also the last late evening journey was withdrawn.

Competition ended on 10 October 1999 after seven years. Thamesway and Arriva agreed to co-operate, and began to operate a joint service, still Green Line branded. The basic service was renumbered 721, with peak hour variants 720, 722 and 72. The Piccadilly section of the route was withdrawn. The off peak service ran every 30 minutes on Mondays to Saturdays, and on Sundays every two hours, Arriva operating the service alone. There was no late evening service. Both operators provided eight coaches each, and registered their journeys separately.

In December 1999 more variety was added to the fleet with the acquisition of four second hand Van Hool bodied Scanias, which were the first air conditioned coaches for the route. On 17 January bringing further variants 709 and 710, to provide faster peak journeys. Two DAF SB300s arrived from Arriva Shires & Essex in August 2000 after their use on Green Line route 757 ceased.

=== Change of operator and withdrawal ===
Passenger numbers began to drop, traffic congestion worsened and the parallel London, Tilbury and Southend line run by c2c offered discounted season tickets. A few years later, Arriva decided the service was no longer viable and withdrew it completely.

In 2001 Stephensons of Essex took over the operation of the service, reintroducing the route numbers X1 and X10. However, Stephensons announced in May 2008 that it was going to withdraw the services on 11 July 2008. The company blamed several factors for its decision, including significant rises in fuel costs and new European Union drivers' hours regulations, meaning the service would have to be shortened. The introduction of the London low emission zone also meant that a significant amount of money would have had to be spent on either modifying their existing fleet of coaches to make them comply or on purchasing new vehicles.

Passenger numbers were also in decline, as the parallel rail line service increased in reliability. Free travel reduced revenue further, as for every pensioner travelling free under the government's national scheme, Stephensons were only reimbursed 50% of the fare.

=== Replacement ===
Rainham based Swallow Coach Company introduced three express services from east Essex into London as a partial replacement for the X1 and X10 on 4 August 2008. Route X1 ran from Southend to Victoria Coach Station via Canary Wharf, the X3 linked Canvey to Victoria via Canary Wharf, while the X10 ran non-stop from Benfleet to Southend, Canary Wharf and Victoria Coach Station. Each route had one return journey with three vehicles required. They worked on a shift system which enabled them to cover some of the company's other work in London. The new services initially operated for a three-month trial, which was extended owing to sufficient demand for the services. The services ran as an unlicensed express, and were no longer part of the Green Line network. However, the services were withdrawn on 29 May 2009, bringing an end to 29 years of the service.

== Route ==
This was the route of the service until its withdrawal in July 2008.

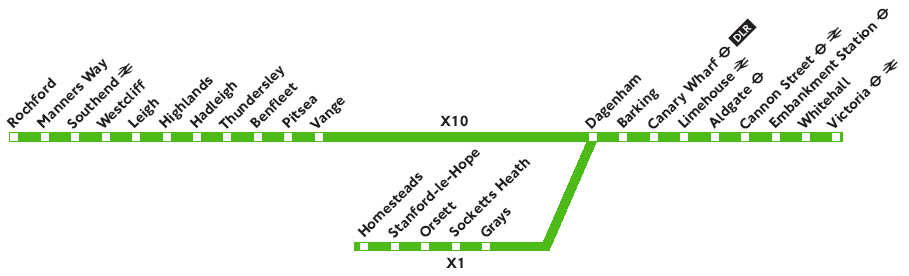

=== X10 ===
- Rochford South Street Fire Station
- Manners Way Shops
- Southend Central Bus Station, Stand F
- Southend Victoria Circus, Queensway
- Westcliff Plough
- Leigh Elms
- Highlands Thames Drive
- Hadleigh Church
- Thundersley Kenneth Road
- Benfleet Tarpots Corner
- Pitsea Broadway East
- Vange Five Bells

Then continued with X1

=== X1 ===
- Homesteads Gable Hall School
- Stanford-le-Hope Rookery Corner
- Orsett The Cock
- Socketts Heath The Oak
- Grays Treacle Mine Roundabout

Then continued with X10

=== Both routes continue together ===
- Dagenham Goresbrook Leisure Centre
- Barking Ship & Shovel
- Canary Wharf Canada Square
- Limehouse Stepney Methodist Church
- Aldgate High Street
- Cannon Street station
- Embankment tube station
- Westminster Parliament Street, Stop F
- London Victoria Buckingham Palace Road
