= Arriva Southend =

Bus operator in Essex, England

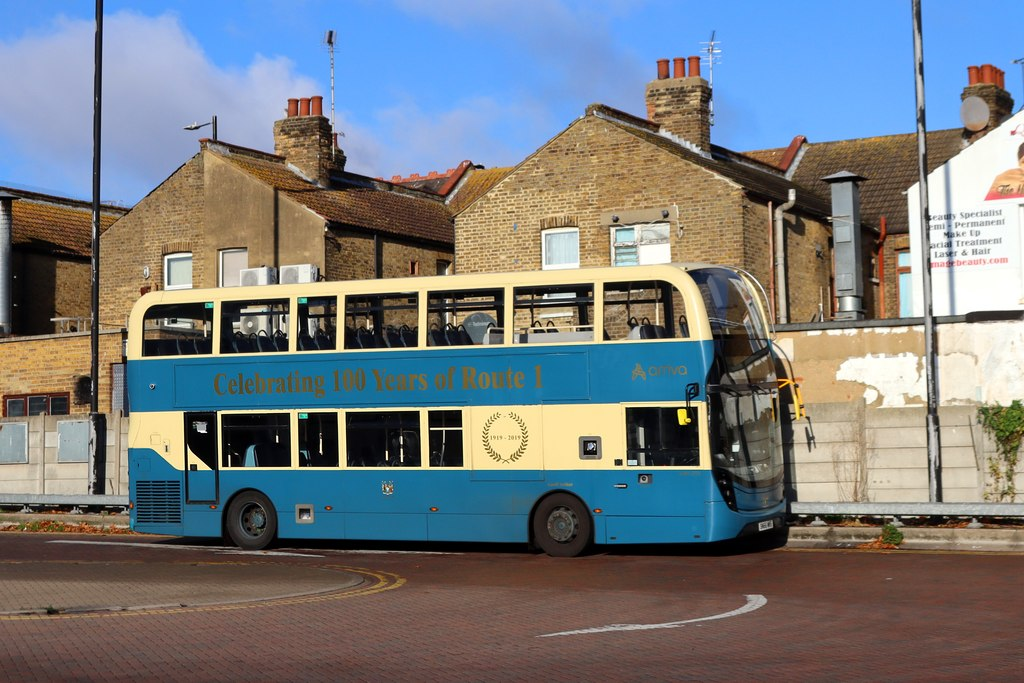
- An Alexander Dennis Enviro400 MMC in Southend Corporation livery, November 2024
- Parent: Arriva
- Founded: 1998
- Headquarters: Arriva Southern Counties, Invicta House, Maidstone, Kent, England
- Locale: Southend-on-Sea
- Service area: South East Essex
- Service type: Bus
- Routes: 11
- Depots: Short Street
- Fleet: 58
- Fuel type: Diesel, Hybrid
- Operator: Arriva Southern Counties
- Website: Arriva Southend

Arriva Southend is a division of Arriva Southern Counties, a subsidiary of transport group Arriva. It operates bus services in and around the city of Southend-on-Sea, and the nearby towns of Rochford, Rayleigh and Canvey Island, in Essex, England.

== History ==
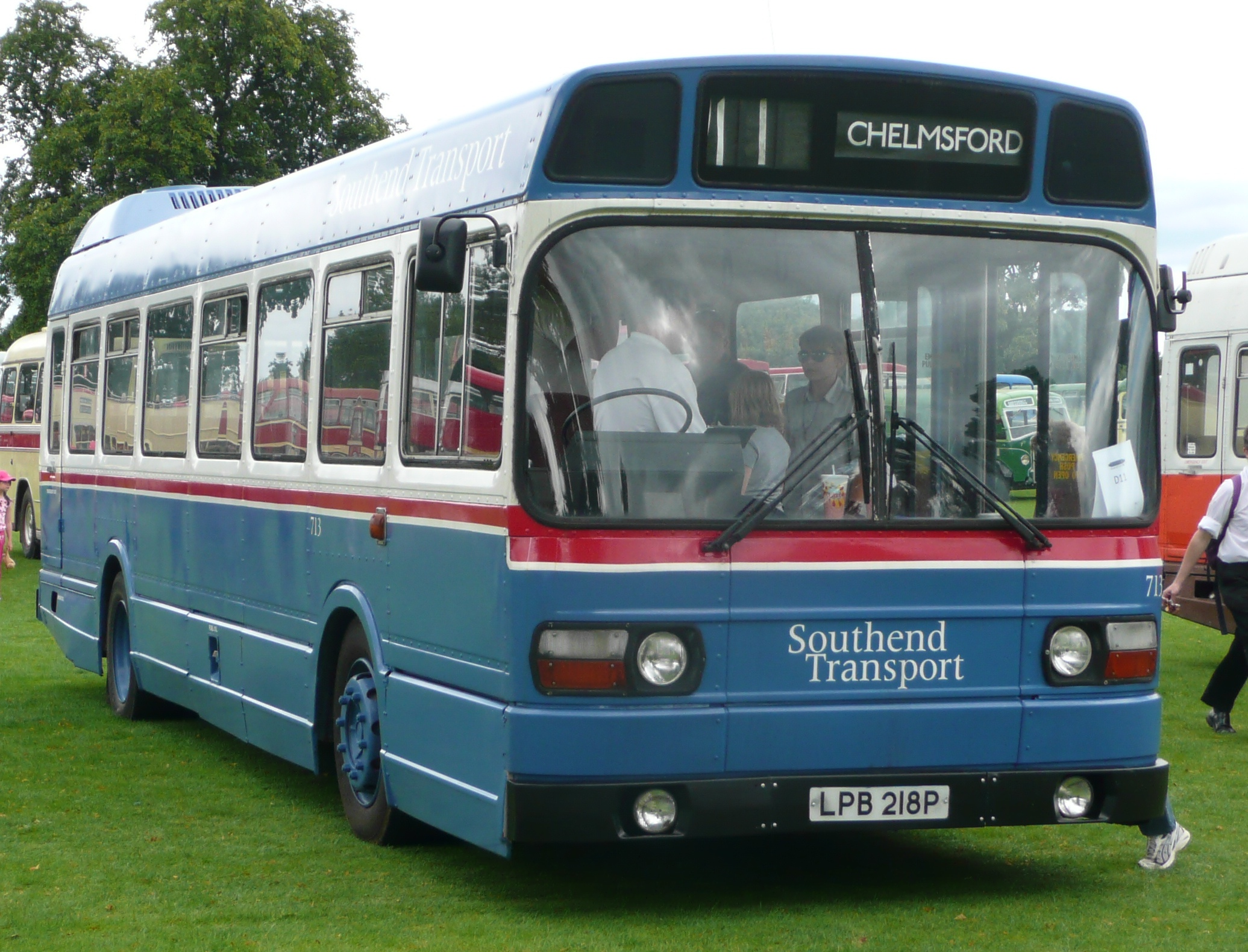
A preserved Leyland National, which had been operated by Southend Transport

The company was founded in 1901 as Southend-on-Sea Corporation Transport; it began operating motorbuses in 1912. It was renamed Southend Transport in 1974 and became a limited company on 26 October 1986, following implementation of the Transport Act 1985. Southend Transport was involved in a bus war with Thamesway in the early 1990s. (Note: Thamesway was one of two parts of the entity that is now First Essex; the other was Eastern National.)

Southend Transport was sold by Southend-on-Sea Borough Council to the British Bus group in June 1993 for a reported £1, which, in turn, was taken over by the Cowie group.

Cowie was renamed Arriva in August 1998 and Southend Transport was renamed Arriva serving Southend, as part of this rebranding. The "serving Southend" local identity caption has since been phased out.

Starting in late 1997, construction of a new depot took place at 20 Short Street, on the site of a former coal concentration yard. Having intended to move to this site in late 1998, this was postponed to September 1999 and eventually to January 2000 following remedial works to fix significant construction flaws.

Over a period of 12 days starting from 17 January 2000, Arriva Southend moved their operations from their original site at 87 London Road to their new depot at 20 Short Street. The move was completed at 08:30 on 28 January 2000. The original Southend Corporation Transport garage at 87 London Road was closed on the same day, and was demolished soon afterwards to be replaced by a retail park.

Arriva Southend had continued the service X1 coach service to London inherited from Southend Transport, latterly as the Green Line 721 service.

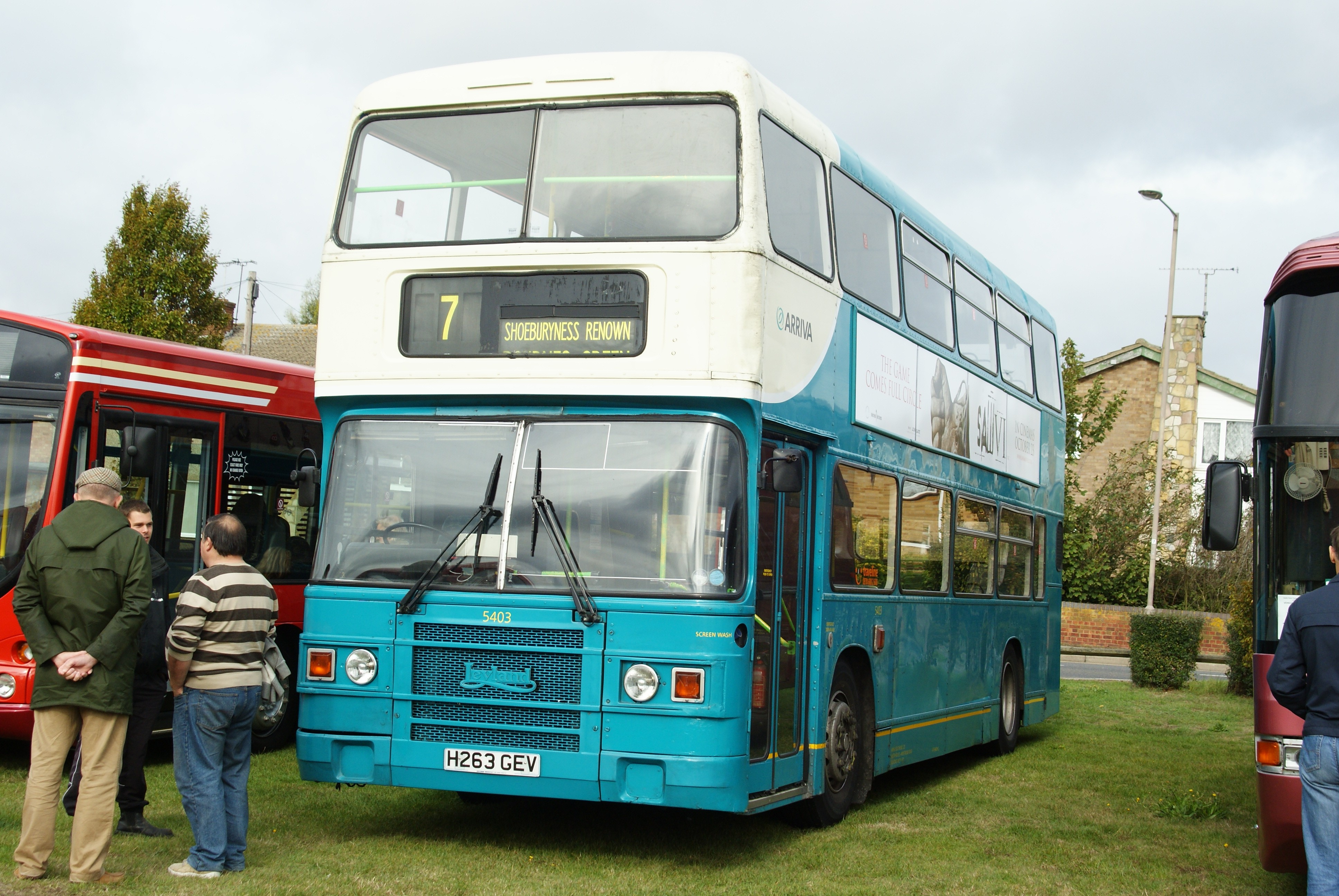
An Arriva Southend Leyland Olympian at Canvey Island bus rally (2009)

A restructuring in 2002 saw overall control of Arriva Colchester and Arriva Southend pass to Arriva Southern Counties, from Arriva Herts & Essex.

On 30 March 2008, both commercially-run routes 373 and 383 from the Grays garage were withdrawn, with the buses used moving to Southend garage. The Grays garage now only operates the Transport for London (TfL) contracted services.

In 2009, Arriva Southend and First Essex withdrew their Day Rover ticket, which allowed unlimited journeys on the day of purchase on buses operated by both companies, regardless of which company issued the ticket, so day tickets could only be used on the buses of the company issuing them. They replaced it with a more expensive Octopus ticket, which is issued by, and can be used on any buses operated by, Arriva Southend, First Essex, NIBS Buses, Regal Busways and Stephensons of Essex in the Southend, Rochford and Castle Point districts.

In May 2026, it was announced that Arriva would return to serving Canvey Island with a new 1X service.

== Fleet ==
As of November 2026, the fleet consists of:

- Double deckers (28): ADL Enviro400 MMC (11), Wright Streetdeck Ultroliner (5), VDL DB300 Wright Gemini 2 (12).
- Single decker (30): Optare Versa (27), ADL Enviro200 MMC (3).

In 2011, 12 new low-emission (Euro 5-compliant), CCTV-fitted Optare Versa V1110 hybrid midibuses were bought at a cost of £1.8 million for route 9 and entered public service in November 2011; they replaced older Dennis Dart SLFs. In April 2013, it launched a £2 million fleet of 16 new 11.7 metre, 44-seat Optare Versa V1170 hybrid buses for the route 1.

In 2016, 18 new Alexander Dennis Enviro400 MMC buses were bought for route 1 and entered public service at the same year - displacing the 16 V1170 Optare Versas originally allocated to the route 1 to replace older vehicles on other routes. The vehicles have free 4G wi-fi, USB charging points and feature ‘stop-start’ technology.

== Routes ==
As of October 2026, Arriva Southend operates the following routes:

- 1: Southend to Rayleigh
- 1X/1S: Southend to Canvey
- 2/2A: Shoeburyness to Southend
- 7/8: Rayleigh to Great Wakering
- 9: Rayleigh to Shoeburyness
- 29: Garon Park to Belfairs
- 62A/B: Southend to Southend Airport.

== Criticism ==
Arriva Southend has been criticised by passengers and the Southend Area Bus Users' Group for withdrawing services that it considered no longer economically viable, due to low passenger numbers; this was even when parts of the route were profitable. Southend Borough Council had withdrawn bus subsidies of up to £6 per passenger in 2005.

In 2007, it was criticised by Southend Borough Council for the age of its bus fleet, as some at the time were nearly 20 years old. Many vehicles did not have low-floor, easy-access step-free entry which was important for older people, as Southend had an ageing population with the most senior citizens in the country. However, most areas of the country did not have full low-floor networks at the time and buses were generally built to have service lives of about 20 years.

Arriva Southend used an undercover passenger scheme from 2009, to better understand problems and complaints with the changes it had made to their services, encouraging them to participate by offering them a week's free bus travel for rating the services they use.

== Gallery ==
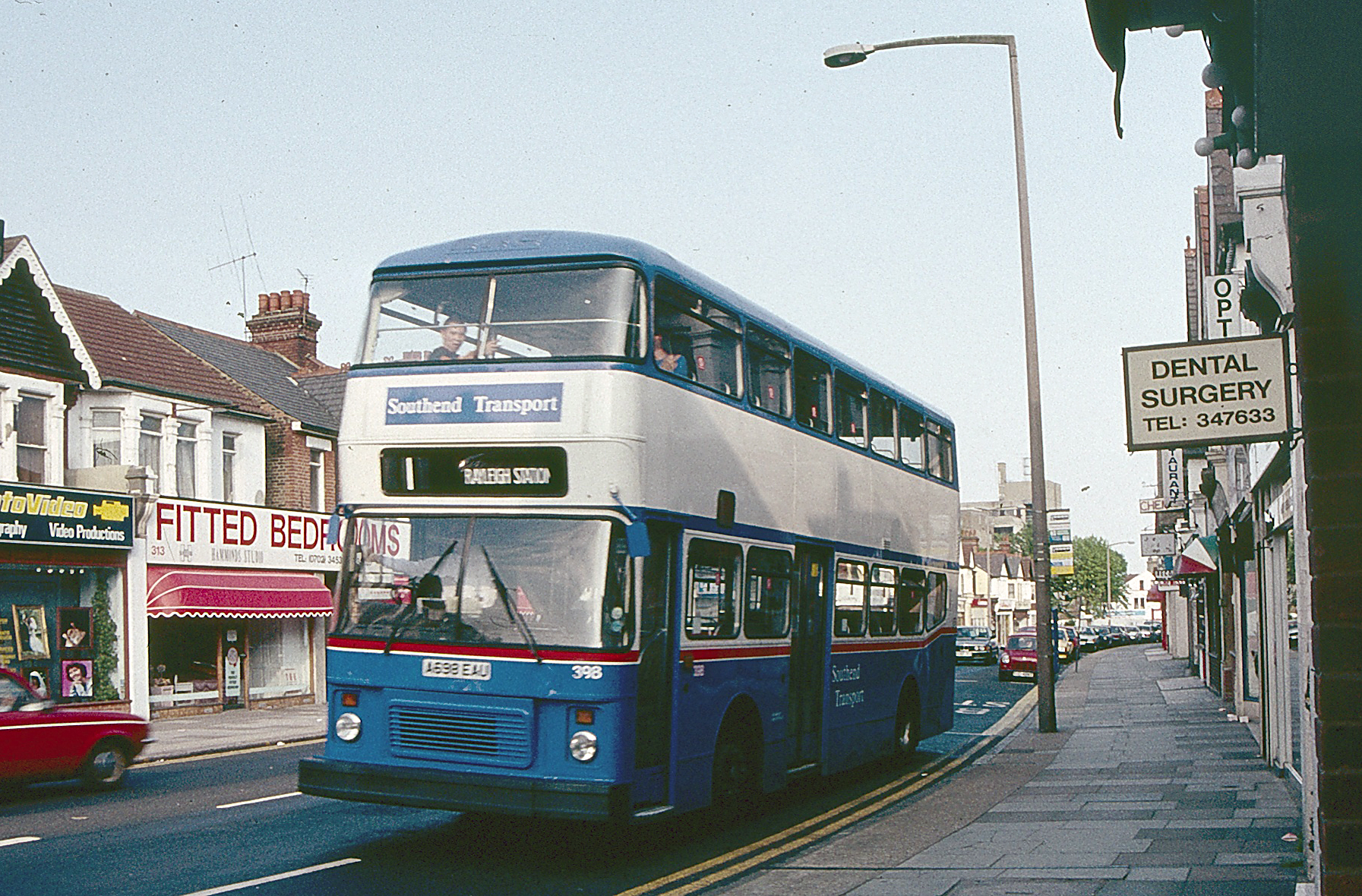
A Southend Transport Northern Counties-bodied Leyland Olympian (c.1980s)

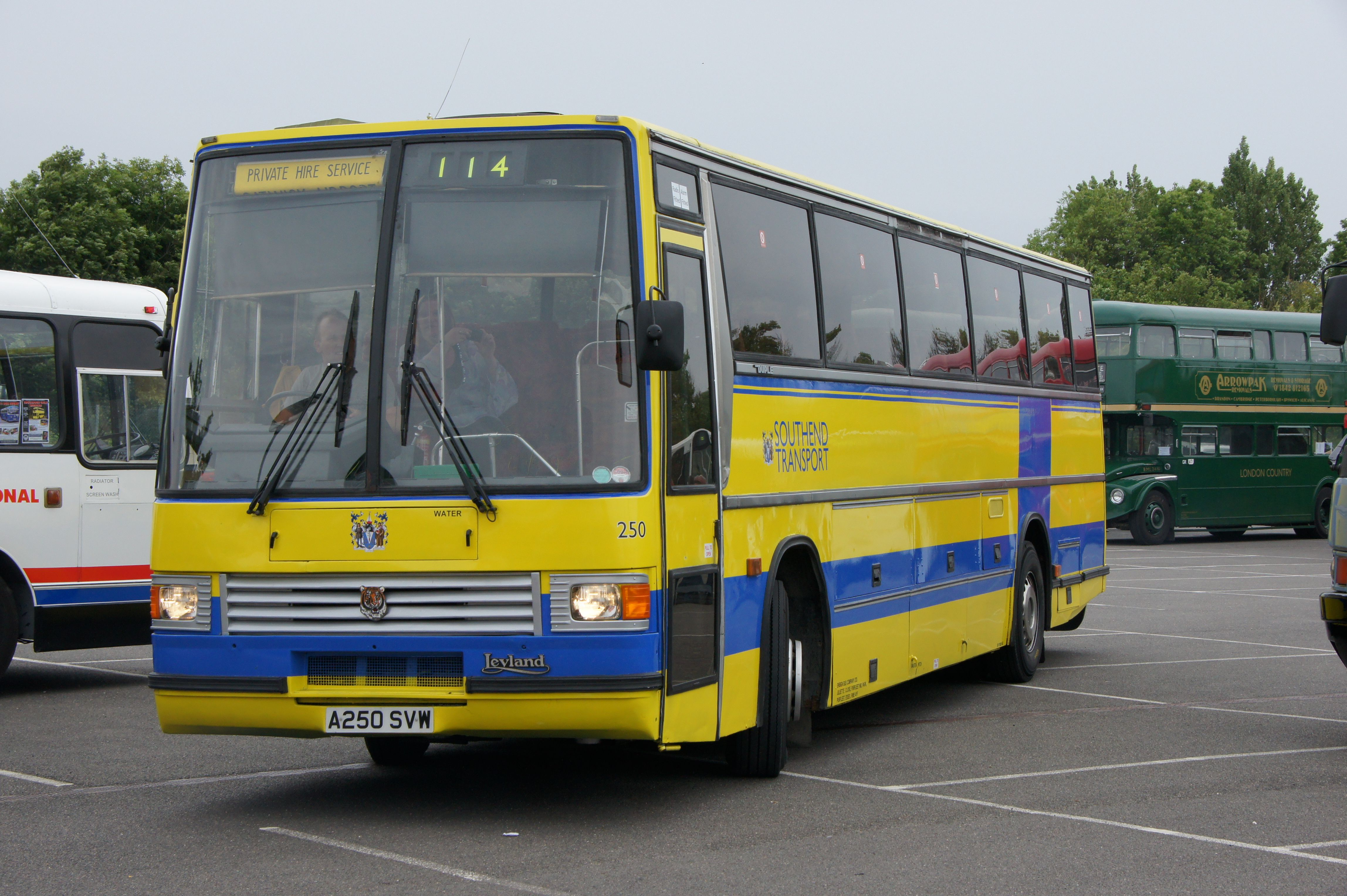
A preserved Southend Transport-liveried Duple Caribbean-bodied Leyland Tiger

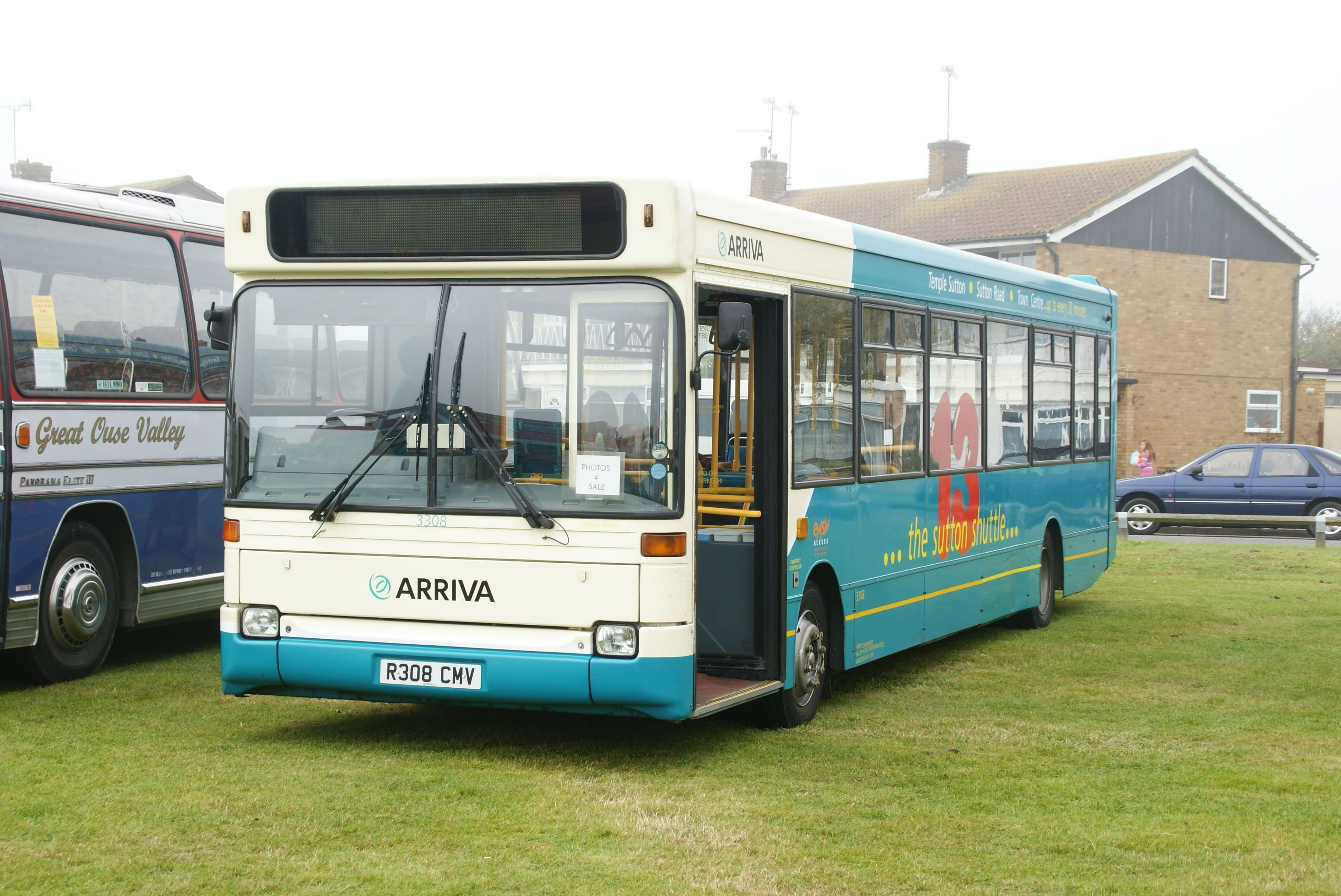
An Arriva Southend Plaxton Pointer 1-bodied Dennis Dart SLF at Canvey Island bus rally (2008)

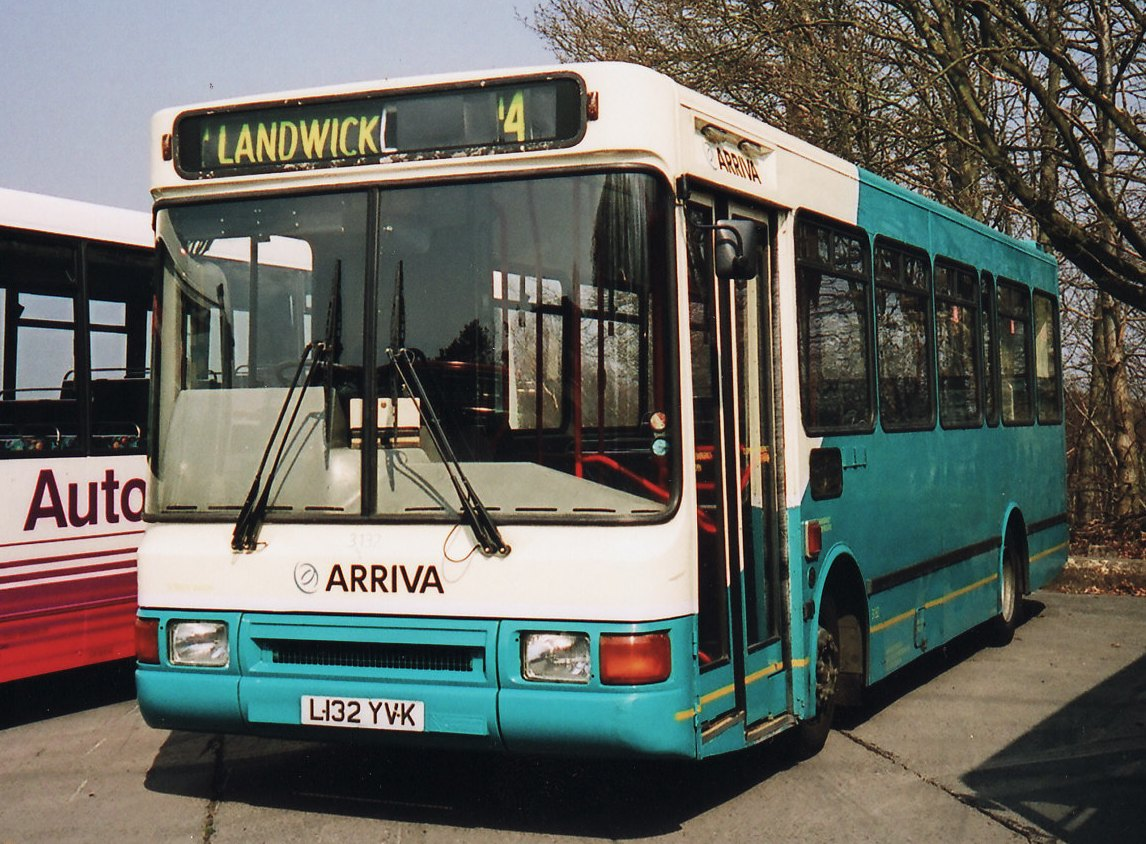
Arriva Southend Northern Counties Paladin-bodied Dennis Dart at Cobham bus rally (2007)

== See also ==
- List of bus operators of the United Kingdom
