= Southend-on-Sea Corporation Transport =

Former municipal transport provider in Southend-on-Sea

Coordinates: 51.5401°N 0.7119°E

- Industry: Transport
- Founded: 1901
- Defunct: 1998
- Fate: Purchased by British Bus in 1993, before being bought by Cowie Group in 1996 and being rebranded Arriva in 1998
- Successor: Arriva Southend
- Headquarters: Southend-on-Sea, UK
- Parent: 1901-1993 Southend Borough Council; 1993-1996 British Bus; 1996-1998 Cowie Group

Southend-on-Sea Corporation Transport was the overarching name given to the local municipal transport services provided to the town of Southend-on-Sea by the local council. Initially started as a tramway, although known officially as Southend-on-Sea Corporation Light Railway, the trams started operating on 19 July 1901 until the service was terminated on 8 April 1942. A trolleybus system was introduced in 16 October 1925, gradually replacing the tramway, before it closed on 28 October 1954. Motorbuses were first run by the corporation in 1914, but two years later they withdrew the services. Buses did not return to the corporation's service until 1932, eventually replacing the trams and trolleybuses. In 1974, the organisation was renamed Southend Transport, and after the Transport Act 1985, it became involved in a bus war with rival Thamesway. The council sold Southend Transport to British Bus group in June 1993, which in turn was taken over by the Cowie group. Cowie was renamed Arriva in August 1998, with Southend Transport becoming Arriva serving Southend.

== Tramways ==
Southend-on-Sea Corporation Light Railway
Overview
- Headquarters: Southend-on-Sea
- Locale: England
- Dates of operation: 1901–1942
- Successor: Trolleybus and Motorbuses

Technical
- Track gauge: 3 ft 6 in (1,067 mm)
- Length: 9.22 miles (14.84 km)

=== History ===
Until the 19th century, Southend-on-Sea was no more than a few fishermen's cottages, and the established centres of population were at Leigh-on-Sea to the west and Prittlewell to the north. However, it was developed as a bathing resort in the 18th century, and the first pier was constructed in 1830. This allowed passenger-carrying steamers to visit the town, but only at certain times. Consequently, the pier was extended to reach deep water in 1846, so that the steamers could visit at all states of the tide. A narrow gauge horse tramway was constructed along the pier in 1851, and the arrival of the London, Tilbury and Southend Railway in 1854 led to the development of Southend as a holiday resort for Londoners and a dormitory town for people who worked in London. The pier tramway was electrified in 1890, with current supplied by a conductor rail, and the gauge of the tracks was 3 ft 6 in (1,067 mm).

As the town expanded, there was a need for public transport, and so a 3 ft 6 in (1,067 mm) gauge electric tramway, using overhead wires to supply the power, was constructed, and opened for business on 19 July 1901, after central government passed the Southend-on-Sea and District Light Railways Order 1899. Lines ran from Victoria Circus, at the top of the High Street, to Leigh-on-Sea and Southchurch. A branch ran from Southend Victoria railway station along Southchurch Avenue to reach the beach, while a circular route ran northwards along Victoria Avenue to Prittlewell, where it turned west along West Road, and then southwards along North Road to reach the Cricketers Hotel, where it rejoined the route to Leigh-on-Sea. The initial rolling stock consisted of three batches of trams, all built by the Brush Electrical Engineering Company. Cars 1 to 10 were four-wheel vehicles, with a wheelbase of 5.5 feet (1.7 m) and an open upper deck. Cars 11 and 12 were eight-wheel vehicles, again with an open upper deck, while cars 13 and 14 had a single deck, and a wheelbase of 5.5 feet (1.7 m). The corporation ordered three more eight-wheel trams from Brush's in 1902. Cars 15 to 17 had open upper decks. The next batch of five trams, cars 18 to 22 were of a similar design, but were ordered from G. F. Milnes & Co. The fleet were in a livery of cream and green.

Robert Birkett became the general manager on 1 July 1905, and set about expanding the network and modernising the fleet. The seafront line was extended eastwards, reaching Bryant Avenue in August 1908, the "Halfway House" pub and Thorpe Hall Corner in 1909, and turning away from the sea to reach Thorpe Bay in February 1912. The route to Prittlewell was not proving to be profitable, and the section along North Road was abandoned in January 1912, with the tracks being lifted soon afterwards. The depot on London Road became an engineers workshop, where many of the early trams were rebuilt. The single deck cars 13 and 14 were rebuilt as open topped double decked cars between 1907 and 1909. The seating capacity of the four-wheeled trams was increased from 38 to 62. Car 6 had extra bulkheads built at the end of the lower saloon, and the upper deck was extended over the driver's position. Several other cars were cut in half and an extra window section inserted. This increased the wheelbase from 5.5 feet (1.7 m) to 8 feet (2.4 m), and again, the upper deck was extended to form a canopy for the driver. Cars 3, 5, 8 and 11 were fitted with replacement open topped bodies, and the original trucks were reconditioned. New eight-wheeled cars, numbered 23 to 25 were ordered in 1909 from the United Electric Car Company of Preston, who had taken over Milnes, and six more four-wheeled, open topped cars were built by Brush in 1910. They were numbered 26 to 31, to be followed by two more batches, cars 33 to 36 and 37 to 39, which were of a similar design, and were delivered by Brush in 1912.

Electrical power for the tramway was supplied by a generating station located near the London Road depot, and it was decided to transport coal from the coal pier on the seafront to the generating station along the tramway. The corporation owned a small loading pier on the sea front, near to the gas works, and this was rebuilt in 1914, incorporating a spur to enable trams to run onto it. Three four-wheel coal trams, numbered 1A to 3A, were built by Grenshaw & Piers of Bolton, with cabs at both ends, and two large "V"-skips between them. They were painted grey, and worked from 1915 until the early 1930s, when the steam engines at the power station were replaced by diesel generators that came from three former German U-boat, siting them at Leigh, London Road and Thorpe Bay. The original generating sets produced 200 kilowatts each, and were driven by vertical compound Corliss steam engines. The cylinders were 31 inches (79 cm) in diameter with a 14-inch (36 cm) stroke, and drove the generators at 110 rpm. All of the tramcars used swivel head trolleys, to pick up the power from the overhead wires. These had the advantage that the wires did not need to be above the centre line of the track, and presented a less cluttered appearance in the streets, particularly when there was double track.

Further extensions to the system occurred in the run up to World War I. The tracks along Southchurch Road were extended eastwards to Bournes Green in 1913, and in 1914, they were extended again to join up with the tracks at Thorpe Bay. This created a circular route to the east of Southend. Unlike most of the rest of the system, these extensions were created on separate rights of way, rather than along roads, and the double track boulevards were lined with trees. Four single deck toastrack cars were ordered from Brush Engineering in 1914 for use on the circular route, to be numbered 40 to 43, but only the first three arrived before the onset of the war, and the fourth one was not delivered until 1921. The corporation also took delivery of a batch of 12 8-wheeled vehicles from Brush in 1921, and for the first time the top deck was enclosed. They were numbered 44 to 55. The final batch of six new trams was built by English Electric in 1923, carrying the fleet numbers 56 to 61. A large amount of refurbishment work took place between 1925 and 1927, with many of the open topped vehicles receiving a roof on the upper deck, and later windscreens were added to protect the driver from the elements.

The route along the boulevards was thought to be unprofitable, and there were attempts within the council to stop the service during the winter months. The tramways department paid the wages of six gardeners to maintain the gardens along the route, and profitability returned when the gardeners were transferred to the parks department. Pictures of the boulevards give an impression of woodland, rather than an urban tramway, and this impression was further enhanced by the planting of grass between the rails.

The English Electric trams were the last new-build trams bought by the corporation, but in 1934 they purchased some second-hand vehicles. Cars 62 to 65 came from the Middlesbrough Corporation Tramways system when that closed, and had been built by Hurst Nelson in 1921. They had two decks, with a roof on the upper deck, but open balconies at either end. The Middlesbrough system had a track gauge of 3 ft 7 in (1,093 mm), and the trams had to be regauged on arrival at Southend. Cars 66 to 68 came from Accrington Corporation Tramways, and had been built by Brush in 1919-1920. They were fully enclosed double deck trams, with eight wheels, and again had to be regauged, as the Accrington system was 4 ft (1,219 mm) gauge.

=== Decline ===
In 1925, the corporation looked at replacing the trams with trolleybuses. Two vehicles were hired for evaluation, and were used to supplement the trams on the route to Prittlewell. The trial proved to be successful, and trolleybuses replaced the trams on that route on 28 December 1928. More trolleybuses were purchased, and trams were withdrawn and scrapped to reduce the size of the fleet. By 1938, much of the track was in poor condition and in need of renewal. The northern part of the eastern loop, from Southchurch to Thorpe Bay, closed on 6 July 1938, though in this case the trams were replaced by motorbuses, and trolleybuses took over on the seafront section from the Kursaal to Thorpe Bay on 3 June 1939.

The rest of the system would probably have been closed soon afterwards, but the advent of World War II delayed the closure programme, and the system lasted until 8 April 1942. The Light Railway Transport League organised a farewell visit on 8 February 1942. The trolleybuses lasted until 28 October 1954, when pressure for an integrated transport network based on the motor bus caused their demise.

=== Tramway infrastructure ===
The system had its hub at Victoria Circus, with a small loop around Southchurch Road, Chichester Road, Warrior Square and the High Street. From this hub the routes were:

- opened July 1901 - along Victoria Avenue, West Street, North Road, London Road returning to Victoria Circus. In 1912 most of the North Road section was closed, leaving a terminus just off West Street at grid reference TQ 87461 86589.
- opened July 1901 - along Southchurch Road, Southchurch Avenue to the esplanade.
- opened August 1901 - along London Road, Leigh Road and Broadway to a terminus in Leigh-on-Sea at grid reference TQ 84178 85852 adjacent to St Clement's Church.
- opened August 1908 - extension along the esplanade to The Halfway House.
- opened February 1912 - extension along the esplanade to Thorpe Bay.
- opened July 1913 - along Southchurch Road, Southchurch Boulevard to Bournes Green.
- opened July 1914 - extension from Bournes Green to Thorpe Bay to complete the loop.
- opened 1914 - spur from the esplanade onto the newly rebuilt Corporation Loading Pier at grid reference TQ 89368 84741.

== Trolleybuses ==
Southend-on-Sea Corporation trolleybus system

Operation
- Locale: Southend-on-Sea, Essex, England
- Open: 16 October 1925
- Close: 28 October 1954
- Status: Closed
- Routes: 4

Infrastructure
- Stock: 34 (maximum)

Southend-on-Sea Corporation had operated a tramway system in the town and surrounding districts since 1901, which had been steadily extended to cover 9.22 miles (14.84 km) by 1914. The town also became a county borough in 1914. The tramways had been authorised by a succession of light railway orders, and was managed by a Light Railways Committee. Once World War I was over, the committee looked at ways to meet the transport needs of the increasing number of residents and visitors to the seaside town in the early 1920s. They considered building tramways on reserved rights-of-way, and the introduction of trolleybuses. There was a particular need to improve the service between Victoria Circus and Prittlewell, which was provided by a single track tramway. A report was submitted by the electrical engineer in 1923, and members of the committee visited Birmingham, where a trolleybus system had begun operating on 27 November 1922.

The committee were sufficiently impressed by the Birmingham system, that they decided to supplement the trams on the service to Prittlewell with trolleybuses, for a trial period of 12 months. They contacted the Railless Electric Traction Company of Leeds, who agreed to provide two trolleybuses on loan, and to erect the overhead wiring. This incorporated a turning circle at Victoria Circus, and a reversing triangle at West Street in Prittlewell. The vehicles supplied had a single deck built on a low chassis with a central entrance. They were fitted with a 35 hp (26 kW) motor supplied by Dick, Kerr & Co, and a cam controller operated by a foot pedal, manufactured by English Electric. They were similar in design to vehicles supplied to Ashton-under-Lyne and West Hartlepool, but had an open drivers cab, which gave them a neater appearance. Operation on the Prittlewell route began on 16 October 1925.

The experiment was deemed to be a success, and the corporation bought the two vehicles from Railless. Trams ceased to be used on the Prittlewell route from 4 March 1927, and the fleet of trolleybuses was expanded by buying an Associated Equipment Company single deck vehicle which had previously run in Leeds, together with the first double deck vehicle, which was obtained from Richard Garrett & Sons of Leiston, Suffolk. The Prittlewell route was extended to Priory Park in early 1929. A route to the seafront was also planned, which would follow roads where there was no tramway service. It ran along White Gate Road to Bankside and opened on 12 December 1928. Further progress towards the seafront was hampered by a low railway bridge, but powers to run along Seaway to Marine Parade and the Kursaal amusement park were obtained in May 1929, and lowering of the roadway beneath the bridge began immediately, so that the new route could be completed in time for the influx of visitors at August bank holiday. The work was inspected by the Ministry of Transport on 1 August, and trolleybuses began running to the Kursaal on 2 August.

To run the service, five more Garrett trolleybuses were obtained, fitted with double deck bodies, capable of seating 60 passengers, and powered by 60 hp (45 kW) Bull motors with British Thompson-Houston control gear. The overhead wires on the seafront were galvanised, in an attempt to resist attack by salt water, and this proved successful, as it was used elsewhere on the system. The possibility of extending the system westwards from Prittlewell was soon proposed, and the corporation obtained an act of Parliament, the Southend-on-Sea Corporation Act 1930 (20 & 21 Geo. 5. c. clxxxiii), which authorised an additional nine routes. The first of these to open was some 1.5 miles (2.4 km) long, running along Fairfax Drive from Priory Park in the east to the borough boundary in the west, on which services began on 21 January 1932. The second ran eastwards from Victoria Circus along Guildford Road and North Avenue to Hamstel Road. It was a similar length and opened on 31 July 1932. The corporation negotiated a co-ordinated scheme with local bus companies, which meant that the new trolleybus routes were free from competition by motor buses.

=== Expansion ===
With trolleybuses now operating on a route mileage of about 5 miles (8 km), the general manager suggested that other types of vehicle should be tried out, before further routes were opened, and accordingly an order was placed with English Electric in 1930 for two double-deck three-axle vehicles, which became numbers 110 and 111. They had a passenger entrance at the rear, and an exit at the front, which improved the speed at which passengers could be unloaded when the service was busy. Two years later, a batch of four two-axle vehicles were purchased from the same manufacturer. These had lowbridge bodywork, with an offset sunken gangway on the upper deck, which was thought to make the vehicles more stable, and might enable them to run on new routes which included low bridges. Unusually, the trolleybuses had a full front with a dummy radiator, making them look like motor buses. A further batch of five similar vehicles were ordered in 1933, and many continued in service almost to the end of operations, although they were altered cosmetically by the removal of the radiator. The corporation also took delivery of an English Electric demonstrator in May 1932. This had been tried out in Bradford and London before being displayed at the Commercial Motor Transport Exhibition in 1931. It had three axles, and staircases at the front and rear, with the front exit featuring a twin-hinged door. It had a half cab and a radiator, but was rebuilt with a full front and no radiator soon after 1945. It was numbered 116 in the fleet, but in 1951 it ceased to be used in passenger service, and was converted to a mobile toilet.

Southend owned some other unusual vehicles. Number 122 was another demonstrator, which had been exhibited at the London Commercial Motor Show in 1933. It was then loaned to the corporation, before they actually bought it. It was a two-axle double deck vehicle, with a centre entrance, and was the only trolleybus ever built by the Gloucester Railway Carriage and Wagon Company. Number 123 was also a rarity, being one of only five 'Q' type trolleybuses built by the Associated Equipment Company (AEC). It featured a front entrance, and had seating for 56 passengers.

Southend-on-Sea Corporation (Trolley Vehicles) Order Confirmation Act 1934
- Act of Parliament
- Parliament of the United Kingdom
- Long title: An Act to confirm a Provisional Order made by the Minister of Transport under the Southend-on-Sea Corporation Act 1926 relating to Southend-on-Sea Corporation trolley vehicles.
- Citation: 24 & 25 Geo. 5. c. l

Dates
- Royal assent: 12 July 1934

Other legislation
- Repealed by: Essex Act 1987
- Relates to: Southend-on-Sea Corporation Act 1926

Status: Repealed

Text of statute as originally enacted

Southend-on-Sea Corporation (Trolley Vehicles) Order Confirmation Act 1939
- Act of Parliament
- Parliament of the United Kingdom
- Long title: An Act to confirm a Provisional Order made by the Minister of Transport under the Southend-on-Sea Corporation Act, 1926, relating to Southend-on-Sea Corporation Trolley Vehicles.
- Citation: 2 & 3 Geo. 6. c. l

Dates
- Royal assent: 13 July 1939

Other legislation
- Relates to: Southend-on-Sea Corporation Act 1926

In 1933, Shoeburyness, located to the east of Southend, became part of the Borough, and there were proposals to extend the trolleybus network along the seafront from the Kursaal to Thorpe Bay and on to Shoeburyness. On 21 June 1934, the seafront route was extended westwards a little, to the pier head, and the corporation obtained the Southend-on-Sea Corporation (Trolley Vehicles) Order Confirmation Act 1934 (24 & 25 Geo. 5. c. l) to allow the construction of the route eastwards. Other work was in progress, and the Fairfax Drive route to the west was extended to Chalkwell Schools, which was also served by the tramway running along London Road. By 1936, more than 8.5 million journeys a year were being made by trolleybus, and the fleet at the time consisted of 21 double deck vehicles. Plans to discontinue operation of the tramway network were approved in 1938, and the Southend-on-Sea Corporation (Trolley Vehicles) Order Confirmation Act 1939 (2 & 3 Geo. 6. c. l) made provision for running trolleybuses along all the former tramway routes. Six more vehicles were obtained from AEC, and it was hoped that the changeover from trams to trolleybuses could be completed by the spring of 1941. However, such plans were affected by the outbreak of the Second World War, and although 36 more trolleybuses were ordered to allow for the conversion and the extension to Shoeburyness, delivery was to be made "when conditions permitted".

=== Demise ===
The 36 new trolleybuses were never delivered. Trams had been replaced on the route from the Kursaal to Thorpe Bay in 1939, with the last tram running on 27 May. The corporation only intended to use trolleybuses on this route in the summer months, and the extension out to Shoeburyness was serviced by motor buses. When the war started, the trolleybuses were withdrawn from the sea-front route. The hostilities also saw a reprieval for the tramway system, if only briefly. The corporation argued that because the replacement had been scheduled for early 1941, essential maintenance had not been carried out, and if the tramways were to be retained for any length of time, considerable expenditure would be needed to put them back into good order. They obtained the consent of the Ministry of War Transport in 1941, and decided to replace the trams as soon as possible. It was not feasible to obtain enough trolleybuses to run the full service, and so parts of the tramway network would be replaced by motor buses. The last tram ran on 8 April 1942, and although the overhead wiring was altered to allow trolleybuses to run along the London Road to Chalkwell Schools, with the new section forming part of a circular route with the existing line along Fairfax Drive, there was a lengthy delay between the end of the trams and the start of the trolleybuses. Motor buses worked the section from Chalkwell Schools to Leigh. Part of the route eastwards to Southchurch began operating in 1943, and this formed another circular route when trolleybuses began operating along Hamstel Road to link up with the North Avenue route. The route from Southchurch to Thorpe Bay, where trams had run on a reserved track rather than on roads had been replaced by motor buses in 1938.

By the standards of the various now-defunct trolleybus systems in the United Kingdom, the Southend system was a moderately sized one, with a total of four routes, and a maximum fleet of 34 trolleybuses. The system was closed relatively early, on 28 October 1954. None of the former Southend trolleybuses is recorded as having been preserved.

== Motorbuses and coaches ==
Southend-on-Sea Corporation Transport Motorbuses & Coaches
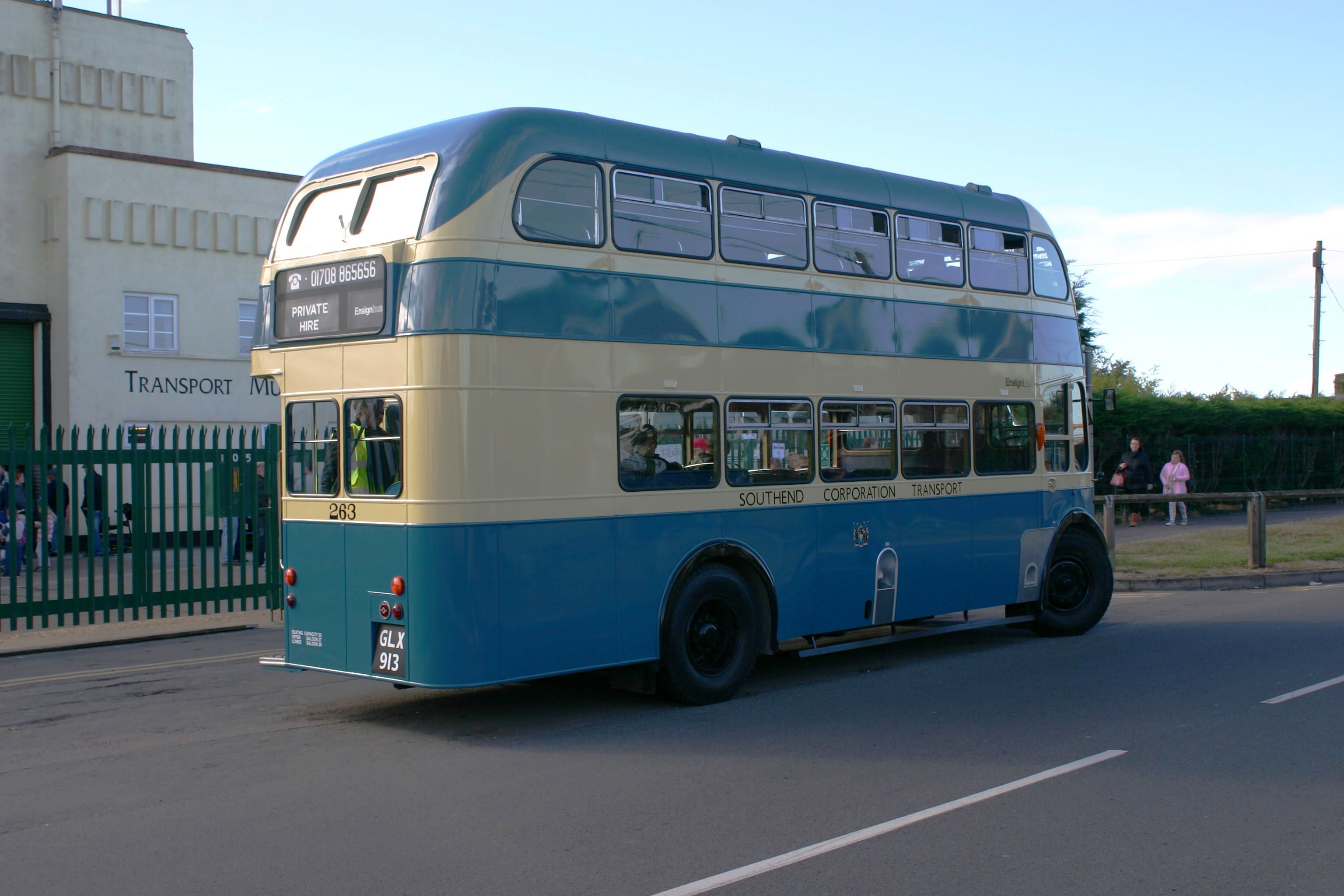
- Founded: 1932
- Ceased operation: 1998
- Service area: Southend-on-Sea; Castle Point; Rochford; Basildon

=== Force start ===
The council in 1912 applied for a license to operate buses in the town, to act as both a feeder to the trams and to operate in areas where installing track was not possible, such as Pier Hill which was too steep. Initially there was plans for two routes, but due to objections from residents, only a single route started on 25 June 1914. The route ran from the Kursaal, up Pier Hill to either Alexandra Street or Clifftown Road to Cambridge Road, before using Station Road to Hamlet Court Road to Wenham Drive, before travelling along Westborough Drive until Eastwood Lane. A second service was run from Westborough Road to Prittlewell railway station at the request of the Great Eastern Railway but by the beginning of July it was withdrawn due to not being a success. The seven buses used had coachwork supplied by Brush, the supplier of the town's trams, but the chassis were a mixture. Tilling Stevens provided three with petrol electric transmissions, three were provided by Straker-Squire while there was one Edison battery bus. The buses were in a livery of deep red coach and grey. By October however the one remaining route was curtailed, starting at the top of Pier Hill and terminating at the north end of Hamlet Court Road, though a few weeks later it was shortened to the junction of Hamlet Court Road and Leigh Road (now London Road). The Straker-Squire chassis's were requisitioned for the war on 15 October, with the bodywork being put into storage. During 1915, a route was run with the Edison from the Kursaal to Chalkwell Esplanade, with a booster box located at the Kursaal so the bus could recharge its battery. Due to the shortage of men because of the war, women were employed in April to work as conductors. However due to mounting losses, the corporation ended bus services on 18 March 1916, with the Tilling Stevens units sold back to the manufacturer, while the Straker-Squires were eventually sold to the National Steam Car Company. The Edison was retained, but its body was refitted as a coal lorry used by the electrical engineering department.

=== A second attempt ===
Due to the issues with the future of the tramway in the 1920s, the corporation revisited the use of buses, and by the mid 20s a plan was drawn up to use 14 seater minibuses but it was rejected by the full council. It took until 1930 for an order to be placed with seven AEC Regals ordered with bodies by English Electric, with the first buses being received in 1931. However, the corporation had failed to understand that the Road Traffic Act 1930 had changed licenses to run buses and their initial route plan was rejected by the regional traffic commissioners. Their second route, from Alexandra Road to Southchurch Park was partially rejected, with the licence only giving the corporation the right to run the route from Seaway to the park. The corporation appealed this decision to the Ministry of Transport, which was accepted and on 5 July 1932 the service ran for the first time. The route ran from Alexandra Road at Prittlewell Square, down Heygate Avenue to York Road, before travelling along Ambleside Drive and Kensington Road to a stop outside the park in Shaftesbury Avenue.

The corporation realised that other routes would be difficult to start without negotiating with the local private bus companies, and agreed with the three businesses that the corporation would operate in the East of the town, while they would operate in the West. As part of the deal, the corporation purchased routes from the private bus companies Westcliff Motor Services, Edwards Hall Motors and Borough Services. By 1934, Westcliff Motor Services had been purchased by the Tilling Group, and in 1935 its managing director J. F. Heaton proposed an effective merger which was rejected by the Corporation.

Further routes were added and by 1938, buses were replacing the trams on the Thorpe Bay route. By 1942, buses replaced the remaining tram routes after winning a battle with local traffic commissioner Sir Haviland Hiley. However in 1945, the corporation, Westcliff and Eastern National Omnibus Company agreed to share the routes up to the boundary of Canvey, Vange and Wickford, called the Southend Transport Pool and in 1946 the regional transport commissioners allowed the corporation to operate outside of Southend for the first time. However the objections of private operators City Coaches and the Bridge family meant there was not much co-ordination of routes.

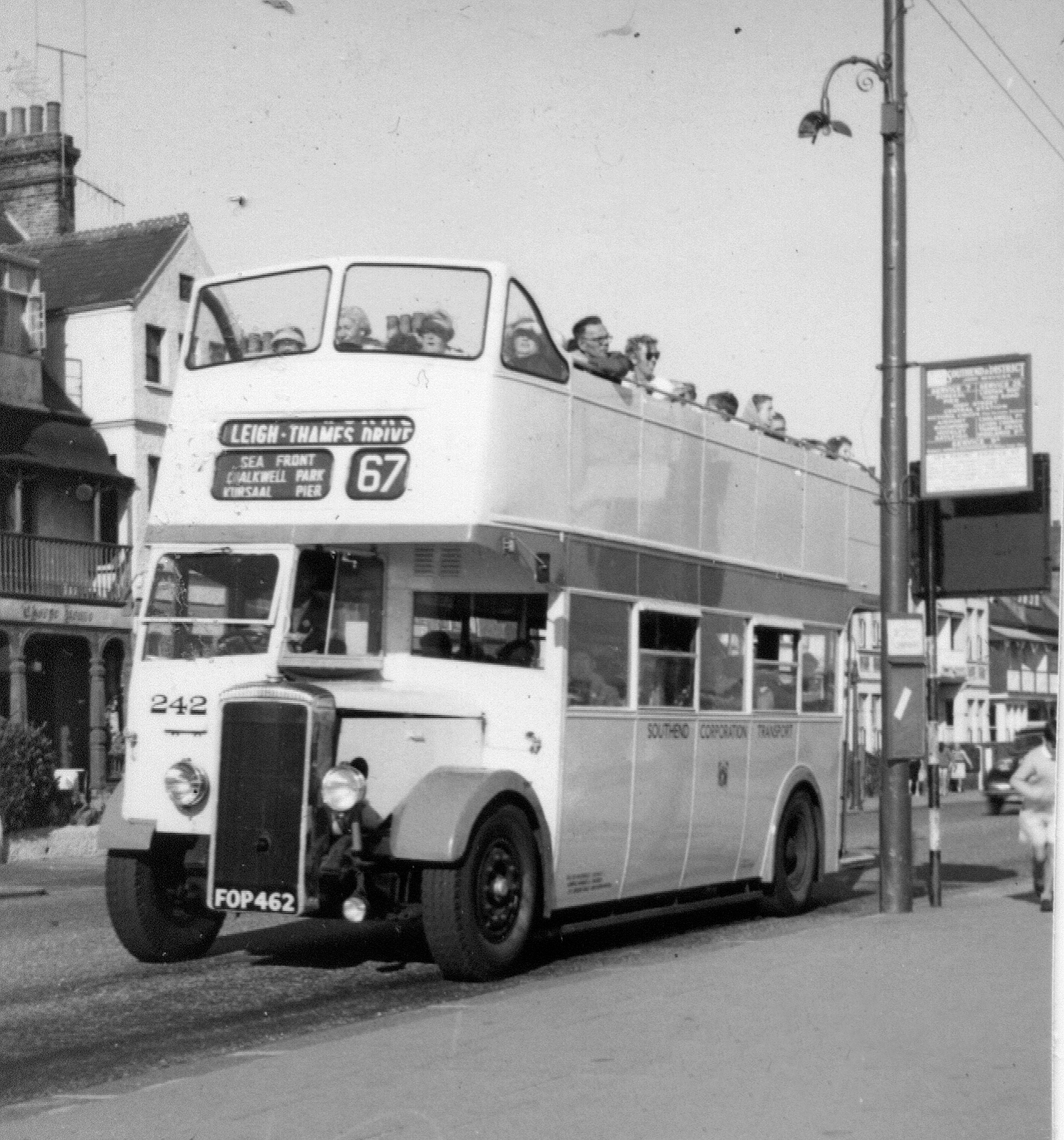
A Southend Corporation Transport open top bus passing Thorpe House on Eastern Esplanade

This changed in 1953, after the nationalisation of the private companies, with the combined Eastern National and Westcliff companies agreeing with the corporation to co-ordinate an area of 96 square miles. The agreement saw the combined nationalised firms operating 63% of the mileage with the corporation operating the remaining. However it had to be ratified by the full council, and on 6 October 1953 it was only approved by the vote of the Mayor, who was also chair of the Transport Committee who agreed the deal. With the council's approval, the co-ordination agreement officially started on 2 January 1955, although it was not until May that passengers started to see the effects of the deal. In 1967, the corporation buses were affected by the TGWU strike, with a skeleton service agreed to be run, while in 1974, due to the reorganisation of local government and Southend losing its county borough status, the operation lost the corporation title and became plain Southend Transport. In 1977, Southend Transport, Eastern National and British Rail launched the Southend and District pass as part of the co-ordination of transport, allowing purchasers to use both bus and train services.

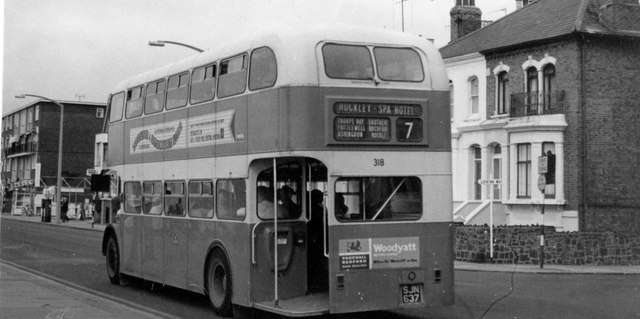
The No. 7 from Thorpe Bay to Hockley passes Lifstan Way on the Eastern Esplanade

With the passing of the Transport Act 1980, Southend Transport applied with Reading Transport to run a coach service between the two towns running through London. The X1 service first ran on the 6 October 1980, with Southend Transport using Duple Dominant bodied Leyland Leopards. At first tickets could only be purchased for 30 mile journeys, but 10 months later, a road service licence allowed for just short stops. The service however expanded greatly in 1981, first with Southend Transport operating Reading's portion of the route while they were on strike, and then further in 1982 with the strike on British Rail. The agreement with Reading ended in May 1982, with Southend terminating the X1 route at Heathrow Airport, with Reading operating a new Goldline X1 to Aldgate.

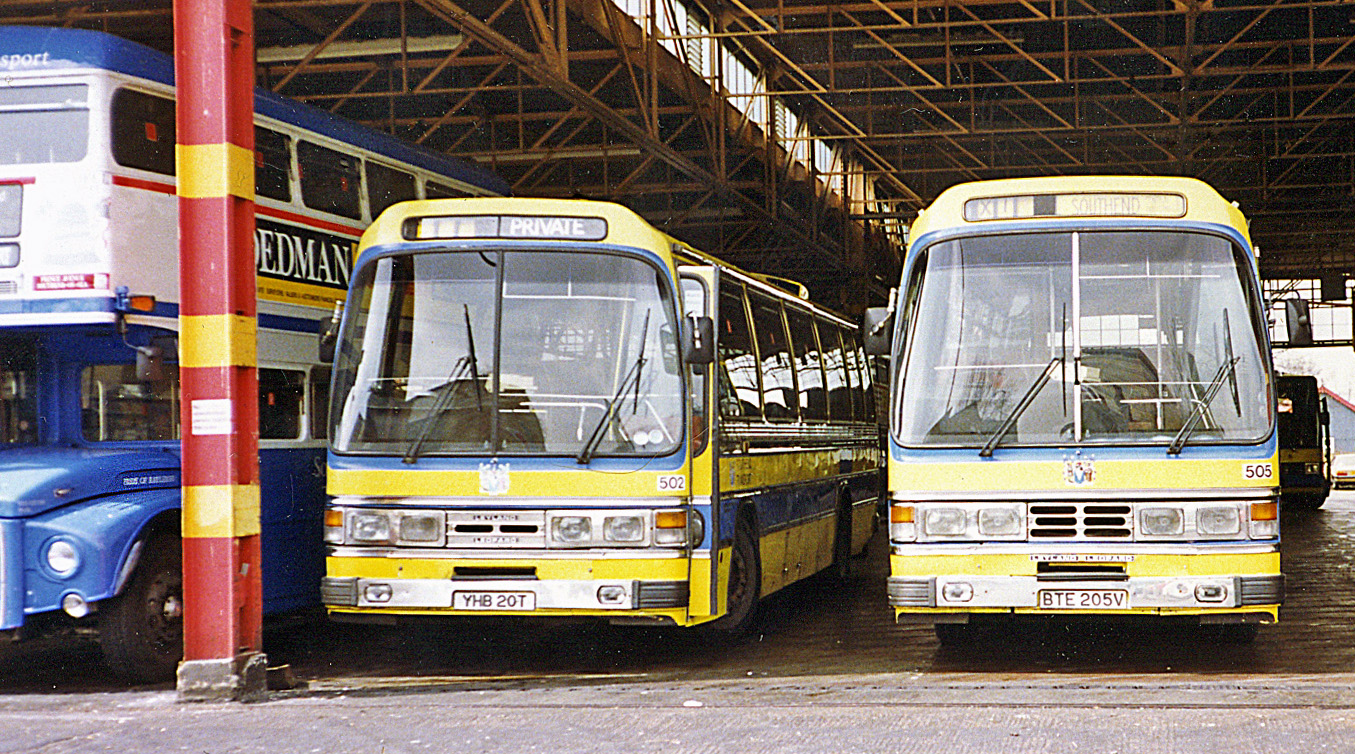
Southend Transport coaches 502 (YHB 20T) and 505 (BTE 205V), Leyland Leopards

Further routes were added, like the X21 from Shoeburyness to Green Park in London, and the organisation greatly expanded their coach fleet to meet the demand. The coaches were liveried in yellow and blue, and by 1985 the coaches outnumbered the number of buses operated.

=== Southend Transport Limited ===
On 26 October 1986, Southend Transport became an arm length management company owned by Southend Borough Council after the Transport Act 1985. After the deregulation of the industry by the act, Southend Transport became involved in a bus war with rival Thamesway. In April 1987, Culturebus, the London sightseeing bus service was purchased from Ensignbus, however it was failed to be marketed properly and was ended in December of the same year. The X coach services were cut back in 1987-88 as the company had expanded the service too quickly, and Network SouthEast were aggressively marketing to get customers back into the trains. The company started purchasing AEC Routemasters from London Transport in 1988, running them until 1993, with the buses painted in a new livery of Blue, White and Red designed by John Lidstone.

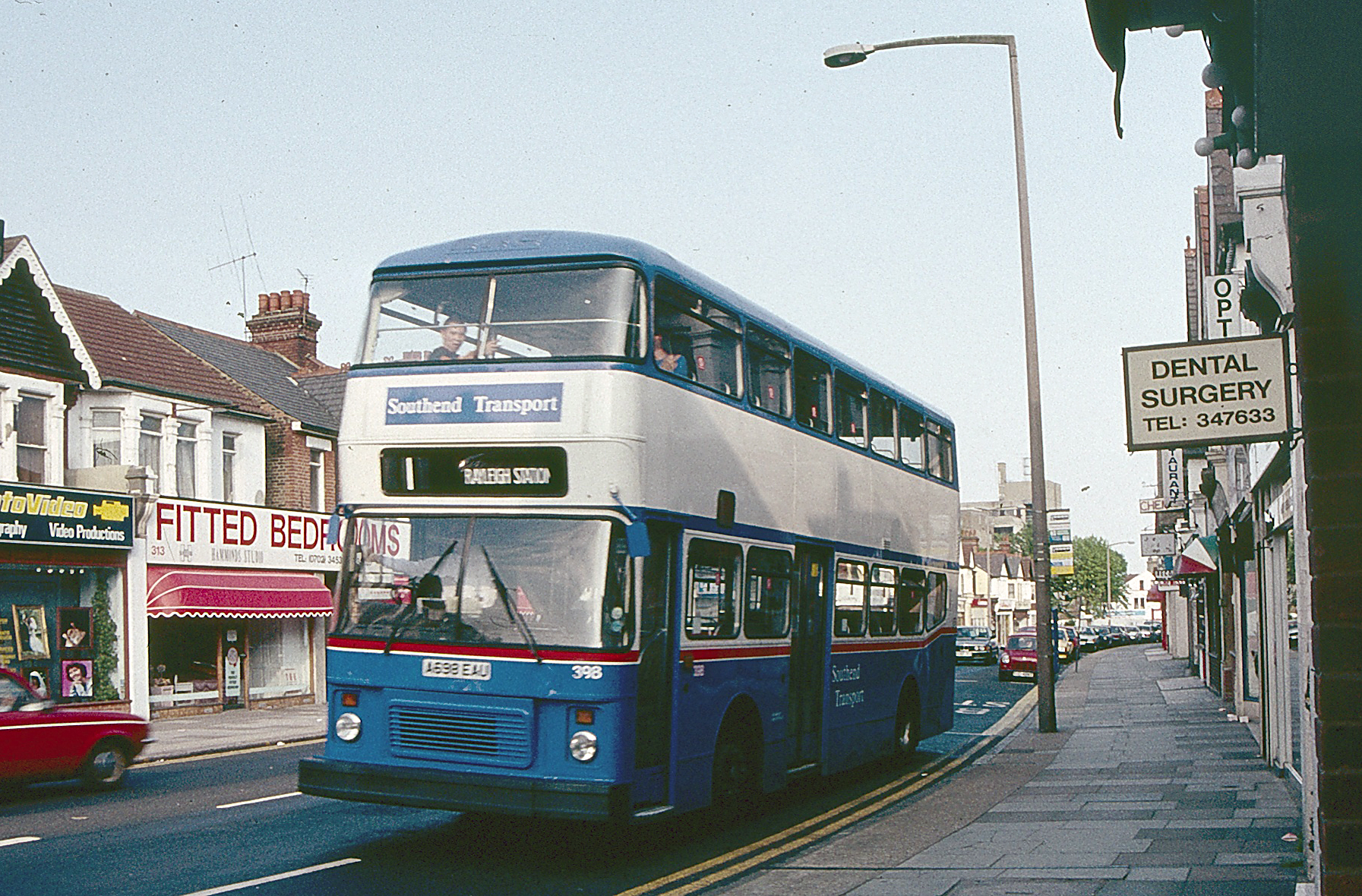
Southend Transport bus 398 (A698 EAU), Leyland Olympian with Northern Counties Nottingham Standard body

The council sold Southend Transport to British Bus group in June 1993 for a reported £1, which in turn was taken over by the Cowie group in August 1996. Cowie was renamed Arriva in August 1998, with Southend Transport becoming Arriva serving Southend.

== Depot ==
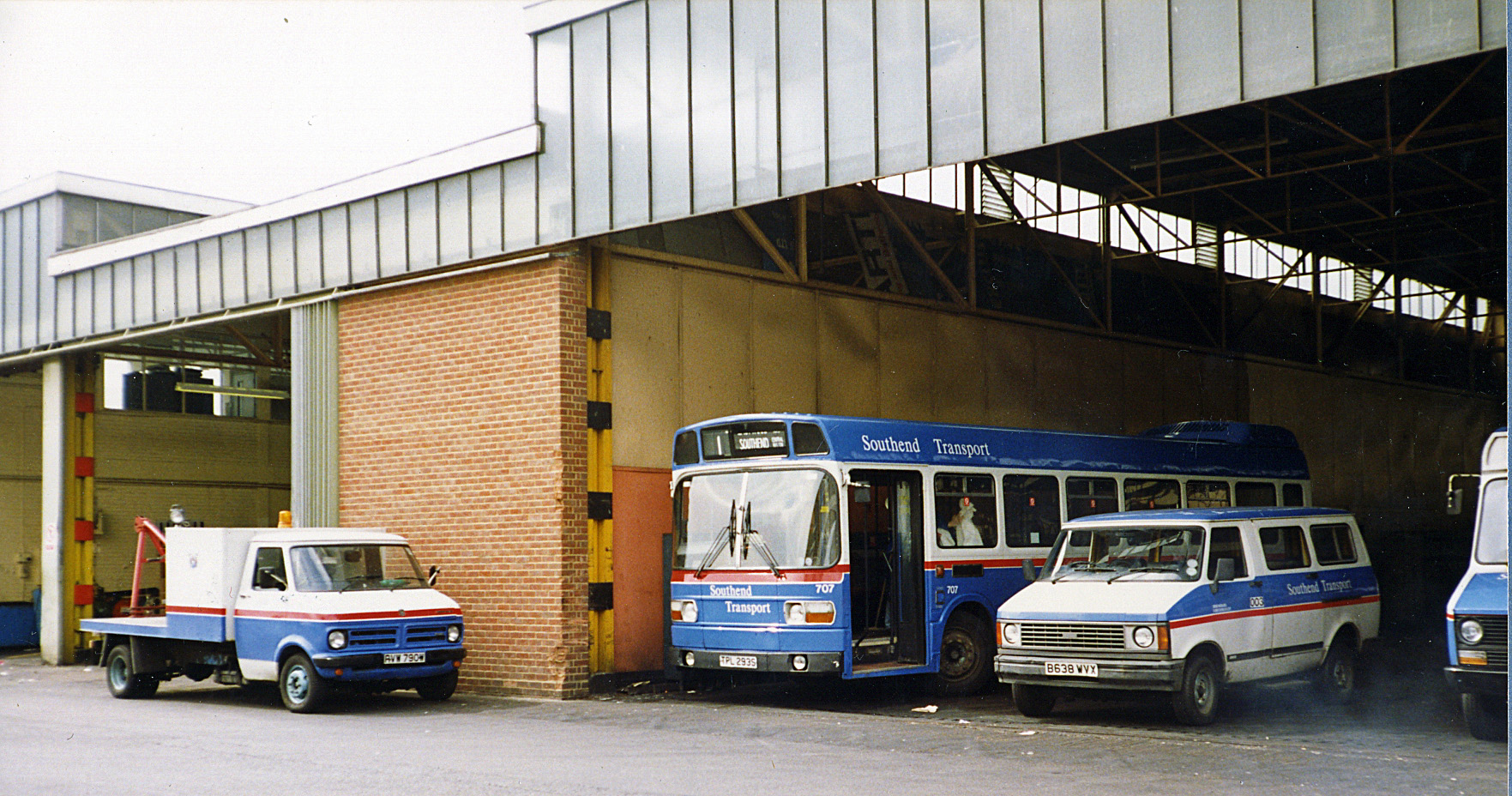
London Road Depot

Southend Corporation opened their original tram depot behind 87 London Road, with no. 87 and 95 later purchased to become offices. The site had originally opened as the town's electricity power station. The nationalisation of the power station in 1948, was one of the reasons why the council moved away from Trolleybuses, as they no longer could supply their own network with electricity. In 1959, a new engineering works was opened at Tickfield Avenue (originally called Tunbridge Avenue), while in 1961, a new garage was built on the London Road, with the former depot site at the rear being taken over by Eastern Electricity, before it was demolished in 1978 to make way for Texas Homecare. With the expanse of the coach fleet during the 1980s, further land was purchased at London Road to store the larger fleet. A fire at Tickfield Avenue in 1981 destroyed an AEC Matador breakdown lorry, with the depot there being closed in 1993. The depot at London Road was at grid reference TQ 87698 86027, which is now the site of the London Road Retail Park.

== Fleet ==
Year	Trams	Trolleybuses	Motorbuses	Coaches	Total Fleet	Seating Capacity
1901	14				14	536
1910	31				31	1632
1914	42		7		49	2678
1921	55				55	3470
1925	60	2			62	3908
1930	55	11			66	4129
1932	53	16	7		76	4452
1938	45	20	18		83	4889
1942		18	13		31	1592
1945		26	31		57	3006
1951		34	56		90	4644
1955			86		86	4562
1965			84		84	5138
1970			77		77	4601
1973			73		73	5327
1981			72	8	80	6081
1985			54	64	118	7767

== See also ==
- List of town tramway systems in the United Kingdom
- Arriva Southend
- List of trolleybus systems in the United Kingdom
