= Green Line Coaches =

Commuter coach brand in England owned by Arriva

Green Line
- Parent: Arriva
- Founded: 9 July 1938
- Service area: Greater London, Home counties
- Service type: Coach services
- Hubs: Green Line Coach Station
- Operator: Arriva Herts & Essex
- Website: www.greenline.co.uk

Green Line is a long-standing commuter coach brand in the Home counties of England. The trademark is owned by Arriva, with services operated by Arriva Herts & Essex.

Green Line had its origin in the network of coach services established by the London General Omnibus Company (LGOC) in the 1920s and 1930s, being absorbed into the London Passenger Transport Board in 1933. After World War II, the network was part of London Transport Executive/London Transport Board, and from 1970 to 1986 was operated by London Country Bus Services.

== History ==
=== Early history ===
Green Line Coaches Limited was formed on 9 July 1930 by the LGOC, which from 1927 had built up a network of coach services from London to towns up to 30 miles away, comprising 60 vehicles on eight routes. These services were largely started in response to the emergence of numerous small independent operators, often running single routes. As well as express services operated by LGOC, some were run by subsidiary companies such as East Surrey Traction & Autocar Services and some on LGOC's behalf by the National Omnibus & Transport Company. The Green Line livery and fleetname was rolled out across the existing express services, differentiating these from LGOC's red service buses.

New services quickly followed, with the number of routes increasing to 27 by October 1931 and the number of coaches to 275. Green Line also began to acquire some of its independent competitors. The laying over of coaches in central London began to create congestion, so, to relieve this, some routes were linked to form cross-London services, and a short-lived coach station was opened in Poland Street, Soho at the end of 1930.

On 1 July 1933, Green Line passed to the new London Passenger Transport Board and competing services within the London Passenger Transport Area were absorbed into the network. Various vehicles of numerous different types were inherited, and much effort was made in replacing these with a standardised fleet of vehicles from late 1936. Poland Street coach station was closed, and almost all routes were linked to run across London.

=== Post-war era ===
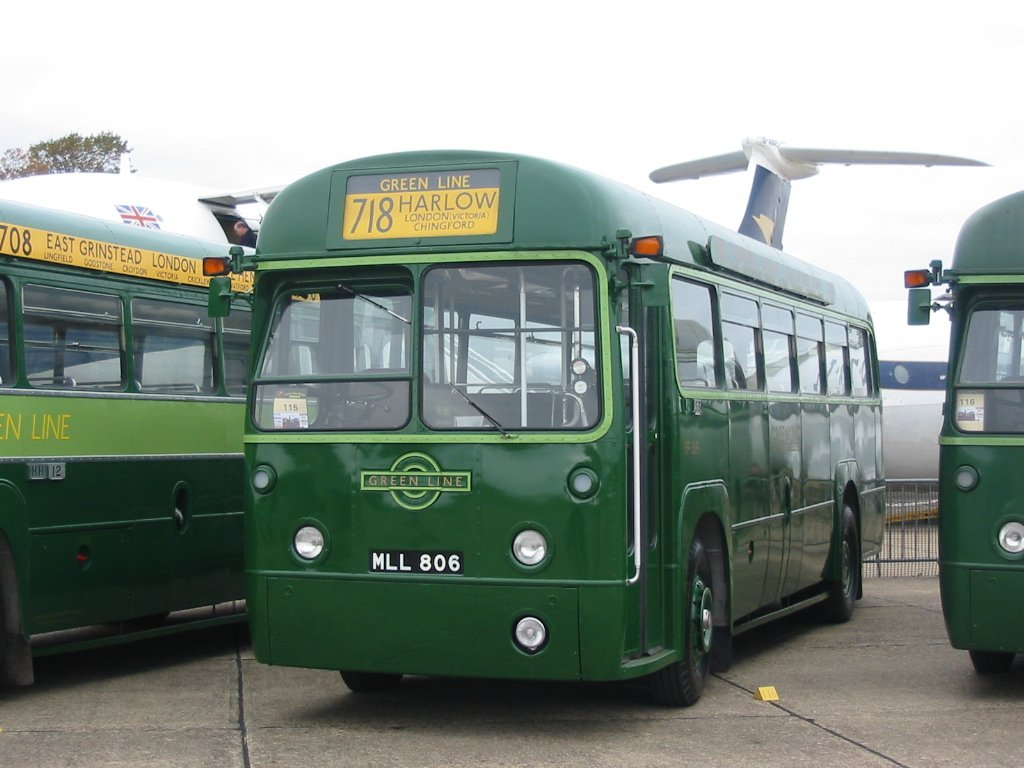
Preserved Metro-Cammell bodied AEC Regal IV

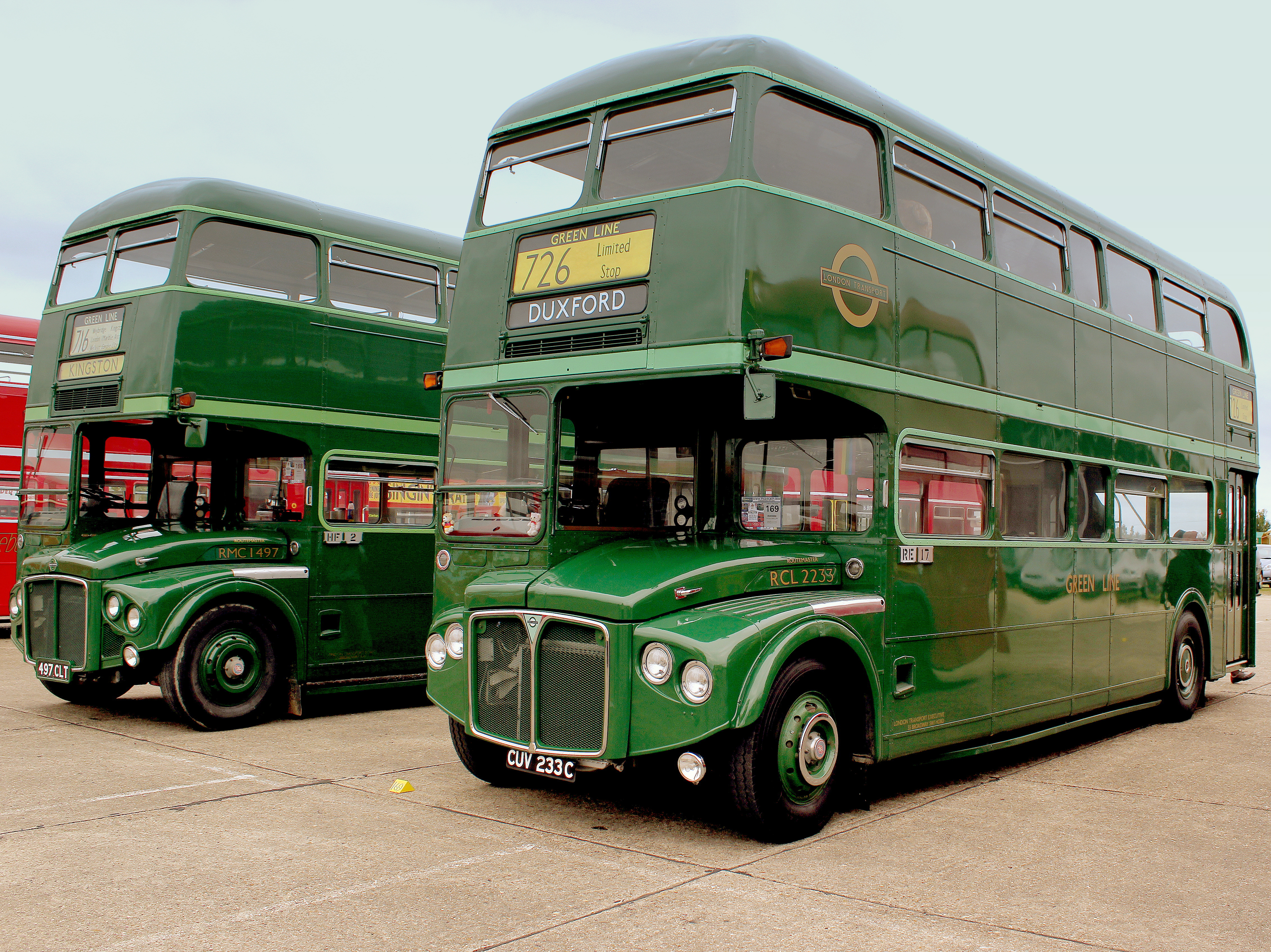
Preserved AEC Routemasters

Services were suspended during World War II, resuming in February 1946. Routes in 1949:

- 701 Gravesend to Ascot
- 702 Gravesend to Sunningdale
- 703 Wrotham to Amersham
- 704 Tunbridge Wells to Windsor
- 705 Sevenoaks to Windsor
- 706 Westerham to Aylesbury
- 707 Oxted to Aylesbury
- 708 East Grinstead to Hemel Hempstead
- 709 Godstone to Chesham
- 710 Crawley to Amersham
- 711 Reigate to High Wycombe
- 712 Dorking to Luton
- 713 Dorking to Dunstable
- 714 Dorking to Baker Street
- 715 Guildford to Hertford
- 716 Chertsey to Hitchin
- 717 Woking to Welwyn Garden City
- 718 Windsor to Epping
- 720 Bishops Stortford to Aldgate
- 721 Brentwood to Aldgate
- 722 Upminster to Aldgate
- 723 Tilbury to Aldgate
- 726 Baker Street to Whipsnade (summer only)
- 727 Luton to King's Cross

More services were added, and the routes were given numbers in the 700 series. Ridership increased to a peak of 36 million passenger journeys a year between 1957 and 1960. In 1962, AEC Routemaster double-deck coaches were introduced on some routes, notably route 721 which ran every 12 minutes at peak times, and route 704 conveying tourists to Windsor and Royal Tunbridge Wells. Orbital coach routes commenced:

- 724 from High Wycombe around the north of London to Romford
- 725 from Windsor around the south of London to Gravesend
- 727 from Crawley around the west of London to Luton

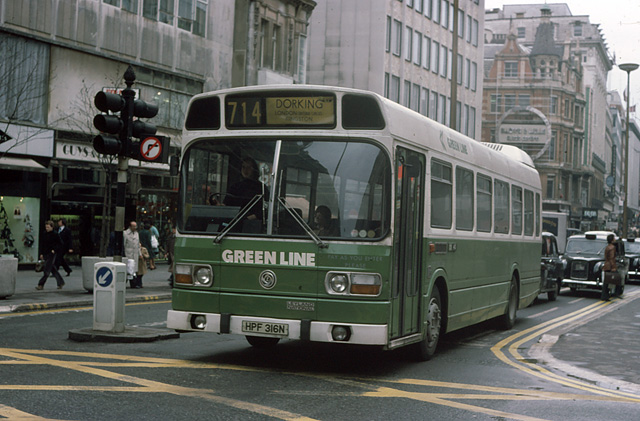
Leyland National on Oxford Street in June 1976

In 1970, London Transport became the responsibility of the Greater London Council, so control of Green Line was passed from London Transport to London Country Bus Services, part of the state-owned National Bus Company. Patronage was declining, partly as a result of increasing car use and quicker parallel rail services, and the last cross-London routes ceased in 1979.

The Transport Act 1980 deregulated coach services, and Green Line expanded services beyond its traditional area, to Cambridge (route 797), Oxford (routes 290 and 790, in conjunction with the Oxford Bus Company), Northampton and Brighton. New airport services also commenced:

- 747 Heathrow Airport to Gatwick Airport
- 757 Green Line Coach Station to Luton Airport
- 767 Green Line Coach Station to Heathrow Airport
- 777 Green Line Coach Station to Gatwick Airport

By this time, the orbital services 724 and 726 (a variant of the 725) had been revised to serve Heathrow. Green Line also became a National Express operator.

=== Privatisation ===
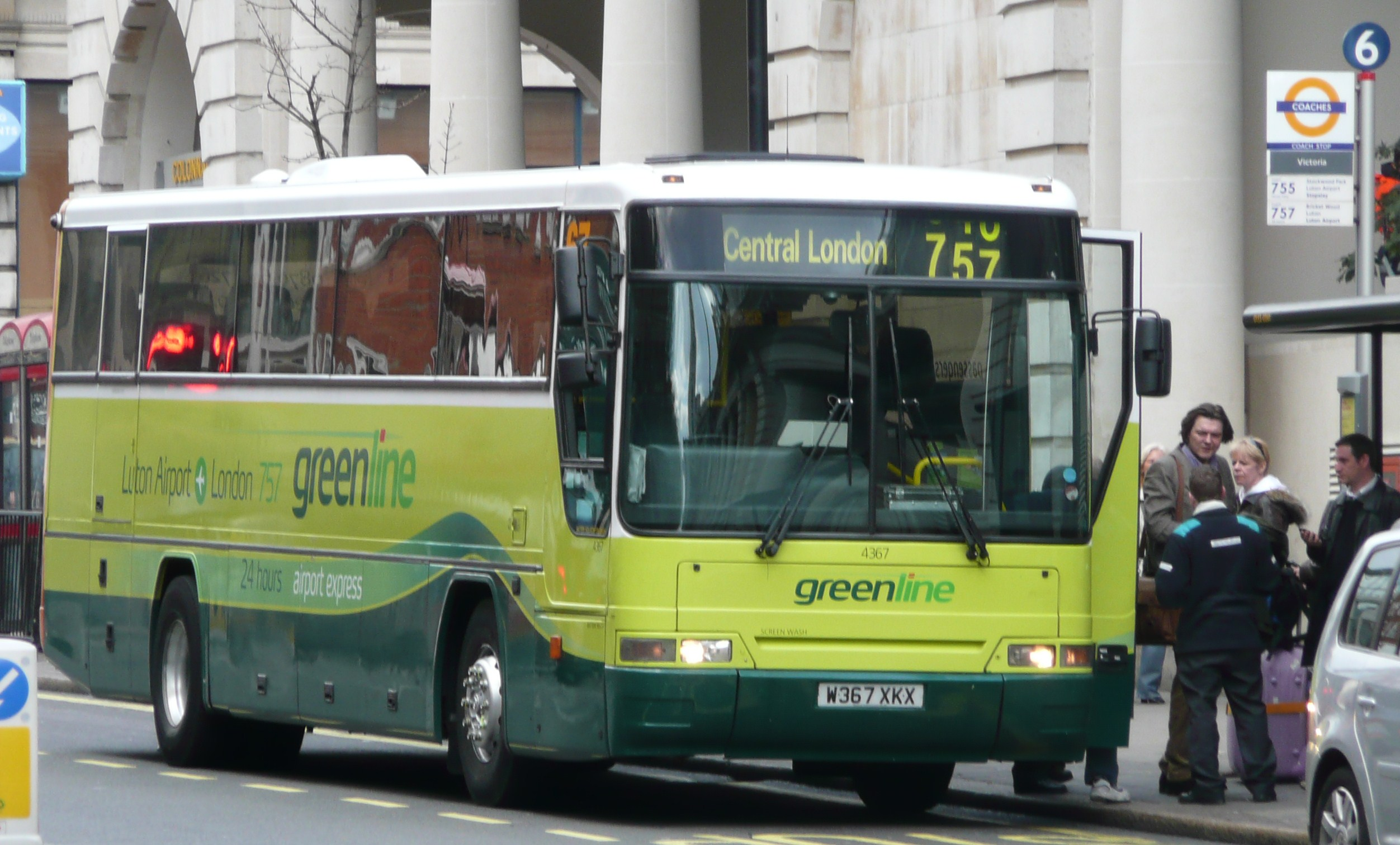
Plaxton Prima bodied DAF SB3000 in April 2008

In 1986, London Country was divided into four operating companies to prepare for privatisation. They were sold separately, and ownership of the Green Line network became fragmented, with only a few routes surviving. The airport services passed to Jetlink and are now operated by National Express.

The orbital route 726 was taken over by London Regional Transport in a reduced form and in April 2005 was renumbered London Buses route X26. By the mid-1990s, Arriva had become the owner of most of the London Country successor companies and became the owner of the Green Line brand. It licensed the brand to other operators: First Berkshire & The Thames Valley (700, 701 and 702), New Enterprise Coaches (routes 781 and 784 from 2005 to 2009) and Stephensons of Essex (routes X1 and X10 from 2002 until 2008).

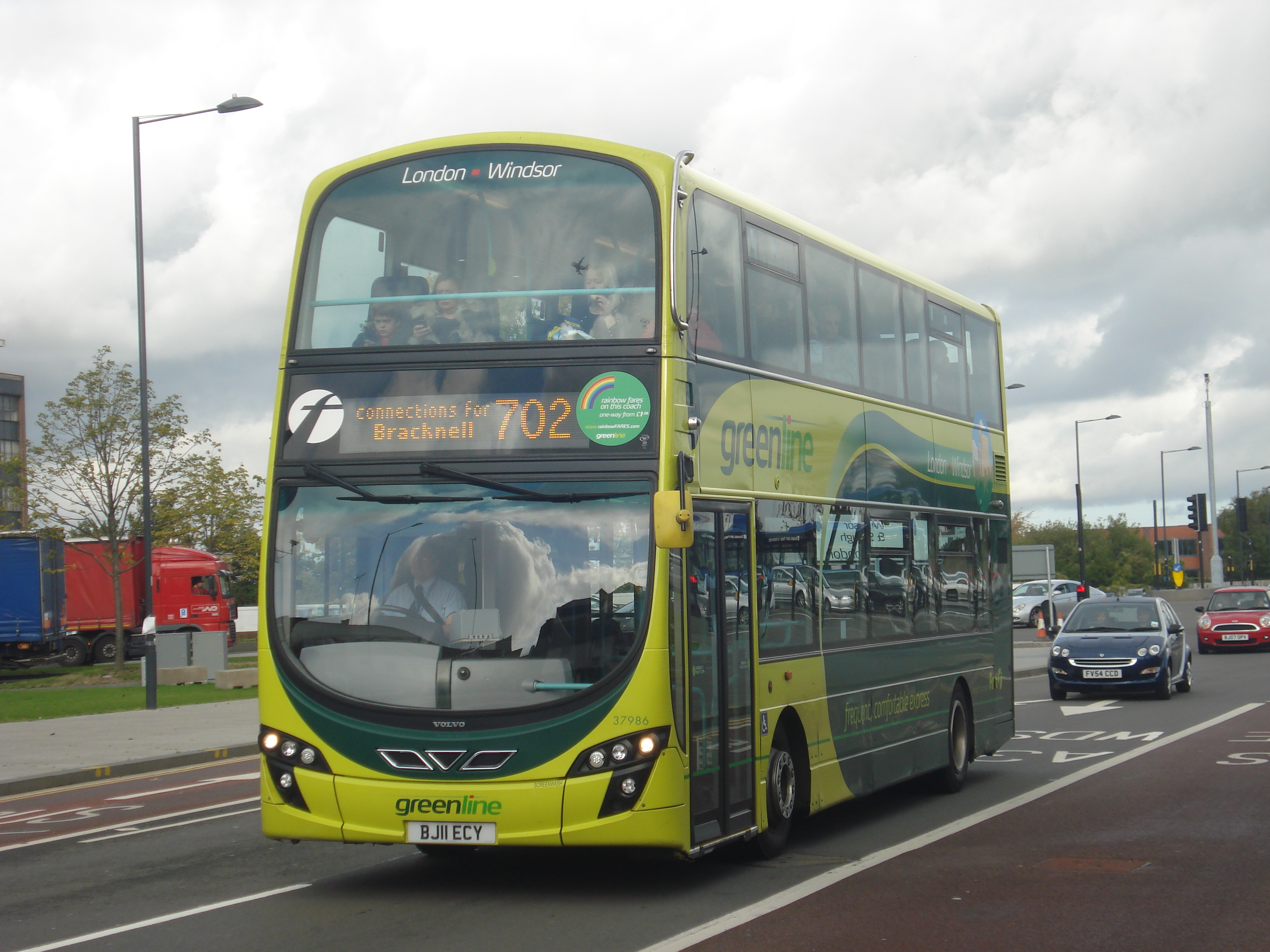
Wright Eclipse Gemini 2 bodied Volvo B9TL in October 2013

Following closure of its Bracknell depot in 2015, First Berkshire services were revised and routes 700 and 701 were discontinued. Reading Buses took over operation of route 702 on 24 December 2017. On 8 May 2018, the 702 was withdrawn between Legoland Windsor and Bracknell. On the same day, route 703 was introduced under the Green Line brand, running between Heathrow Terminal 5 and Bracknell, replacing the withdrawn section. In June 2023, it was announced that these services would no longer use the Green Line brand, replacing it with "London Line" for service 702 and "Flight Line" for service 703.

In April 2020, Arriva Herts & Essex was scheduled to commence operating a new Green Line route 720 from Stansted Airport to Liverpool Street, but was delayed due to the COVID-19 pandemic.

On 4 December 2021, route 758, operated by Arriva Herts & Essex, was withdrawn, citing long-term low passenger numbers made worse by the COVID-19 pandemic.

On 2 November 2025, the 755 route number was withdrawn. Journeys from Leagrave, Marsh Farm and Warden Hill now operate as part of route 757.

Routes 724 and 725 no longer use the Green Line brand. Route 757, operated by Arriva, is the only service now using the Green Line brand, promoted on their website as Greenline 757.

== Current services ==
- 757: Leagrave station / Luton station / Luton Airport to Green Line Coach Station
