= Stephensons of Essex =

British bus operating company

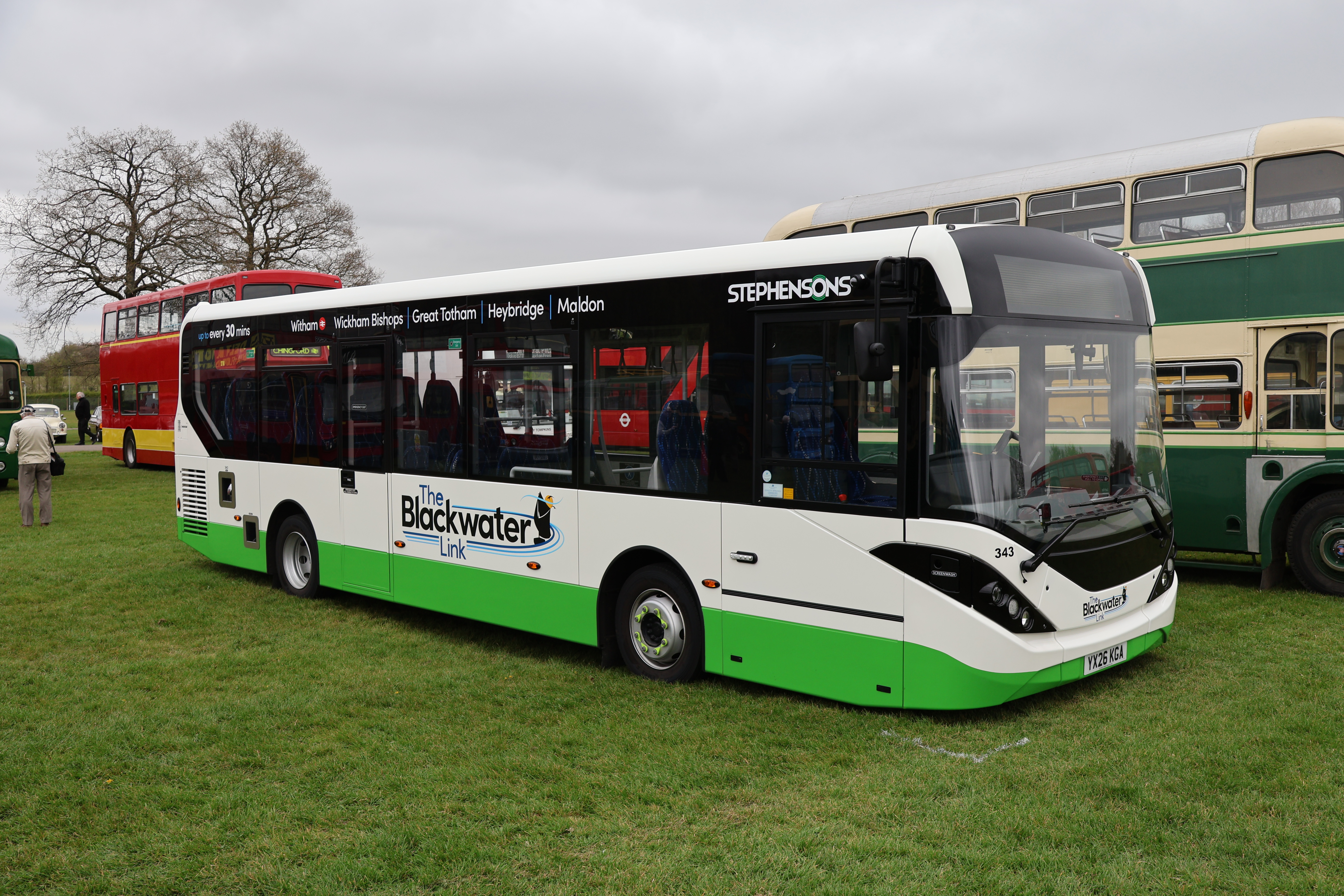
- Alexander Dennis Enviro200 MMC at the 2026 South East Bus Festival
- Parent: Bill Hiron
- Founded: 1975
- Headquarters: Rochford
- Service area: Essex; Suffolk
- Service type: Bus & coach services
- Routes: 85 (April 2026)
- Depots: 4
- Fleet: 112 (April 2026)
- Annual ridership: 1.8 million (2012)
- Chief executive: Bill Hiron
- Website: Stephensons Website

Stephensons of Essex is a privately owned bus company based in Rochford, Essex. It operates local bus services throughout Essex and West Suffolk, from headquarters at Rochford, near Southend-on-Sea, and depots at Maldon, Boreham, Braintree and Haverhill.

It also runs a bus and coach dealership and sales service.

== History ==
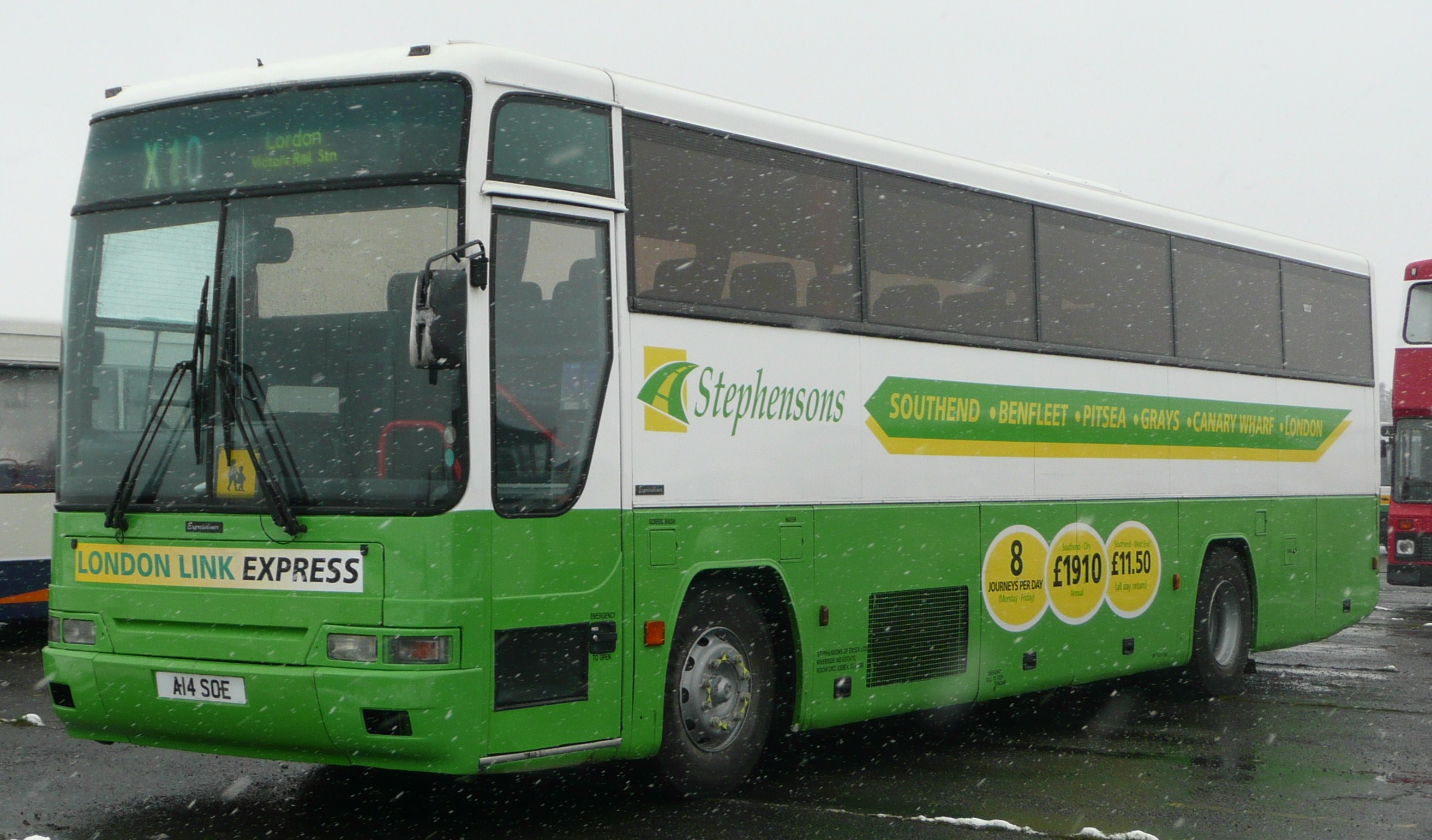
Plaxton Premiere bodied Volvo B10M in April 2008

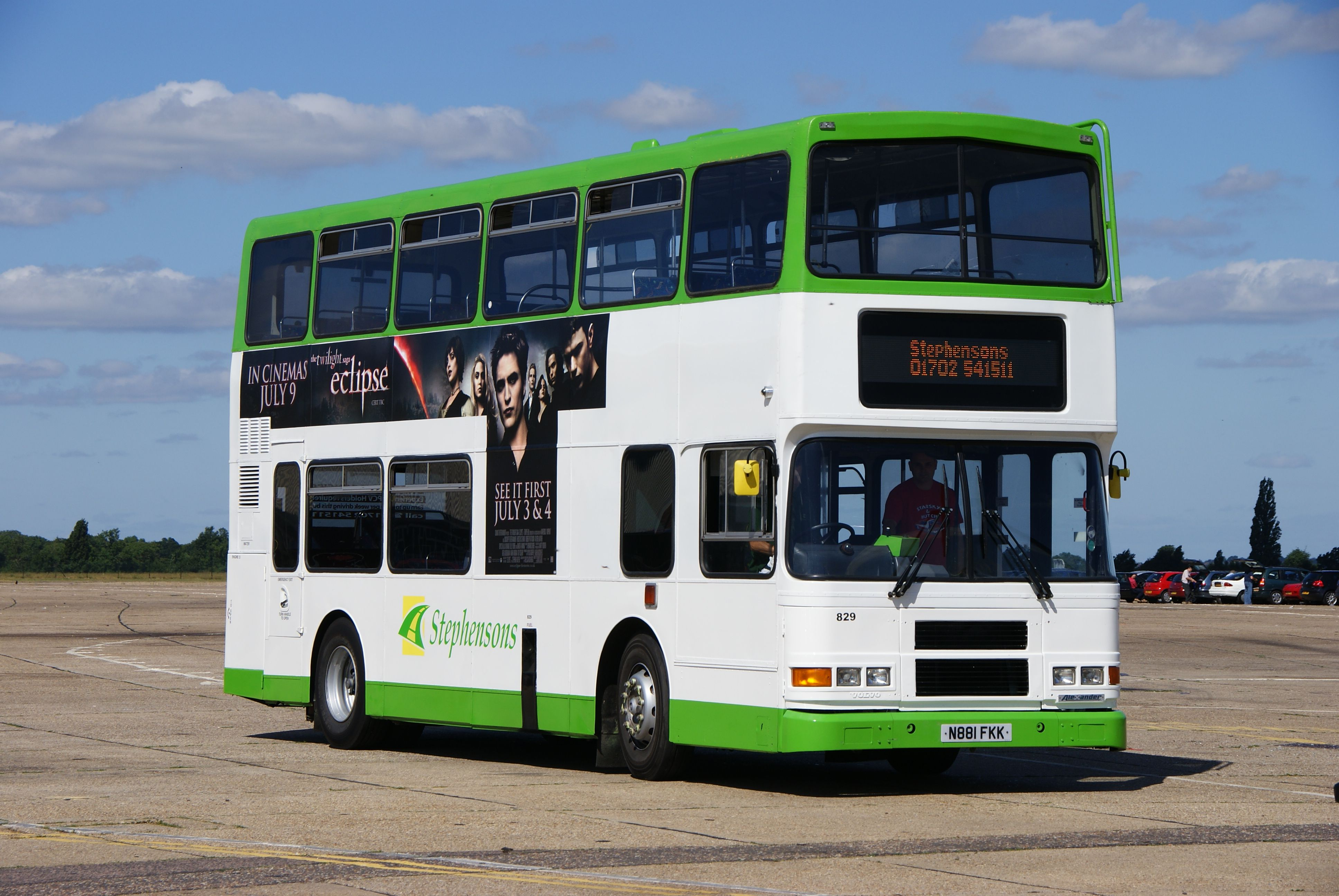
Alexander RH bodied Volvo Olympian in July 2010

Stephensons was founded in Rochford in 1975 by John Stephenson, and has since expanded by gaining contracts for tendered bus routes and school routes.

In 2001 after Arriva Southend decided to withdraw their route 721 service, Stephensons commenced operating routes X1 and X10 from Rochford to London under the London Link Express brand. X1 was the original number of the service when it was first launched in 1980. Stephensons withdrew the service on 11 July 2008. Swallow Coach Company revived the service on 14 August 2008 but it again ceased on 29 May 2009.

In 2005 Stephensons won a contract to operate the Dengie Connections services from Arriva Southend, which it operated for five years from April 2007. In 2012 this was extended for a further four years.

In 2008 it won the contract to run Withamlink services 38 and 39.

In November 2016, Stephensons of Essex owner Bill Hiron purchased Galloway European. The two businesses operate independently. In October 2018 it was announced Stephensons had purchased local bus operator NIBS Buses (Nelsons Independent Bus Services), based in Wickford, Essex and would run as a separate entity.

In September 2022, Stephensons has registered a partial replacement for one of the 18 services that Stagecoach East is to withdraw from late October, taking over the route 12 between Cambridge and Newmarket.

In October 2024, Bill Hiron sold Stephensons to an employee ownership trust.

== Services ==
Stephensons operate 93 services in Essex and 17 in Suffolk.

== Fleet ==
As of August 2026, the fleet consisted of just over 100 buses.

Current Fleet:

- Alexander Dennis Enviro 200
- Alexander Dennis Enviro 200 MMC
- Alexander Dennis Enviro 400 MMC
- Mercedes-Benz Sprinter
- Scania N230UD/Optare Olympus
- Scania N230UD/East Lancs Olympus
- Scania OmniCity
- Scania N230UD/Alexander Dennis Enviro 400
- Scania N94UD/East Lancs OmniDekka

== Depots ==
Stephensons operate bus services from five depots in Rochford, Boreham, Haverhill, Maldon and Braintree. Stephensons also has an outstation in Great Bromley.

=== Rochford ===
Rochford depot is situated on South Street and was the first depot opened by Stephensons in 1975. It remains as an operational depot and is the Headquarters of the company.

Rochford depot operates routes around Southend-on-Sea and some surrounding areas, operating routes: 14, 17/A, 23/A/B, 24, 60/A, 61, 62 & 63. It also operates school services 515, 806-808, 810-812, (for King Edmund School), 815, 816 & 817.

(As off July 2026).

=== Boreham ===
Boreham depot is situated on the Waltham Road Industrial Estate and is Stephensons newest facility, which opened in 2014. It also houses a new, "state of the art" maintenance and engineering capability for the company.

Boreham depot operates services in mid Essex. These include routes 16, 30, Three Rivers route 38/A, 39, and Brentwood Town services 71/C and 72. It also operates school routes 602, 605/A (for Great Baddow High School) and 621.

=== Haverhill ===
Haverhill depot is situated on Duddery Hill and operates all of their services in Suffolk and West Essex.

Haverhill depot operates routes "Breeze 1 & 2", 5, 6, 14/A/B, 15/A, 16, 34, 59, 60, 301, 313/A, 384 and 385. It also operates school services 25, 310, 311/A, 351, 438, 441, 444, 446, 453, 966 and 985.

=== Maldon ===
Maldon depot is situated on Bates Road and operates services in mid-Essex.

Maldon depot operates routes 12, Blackwater Link 90 and Maldon Town Service 288. It also operates school routes 101, 503, 504, 505, 506, 510, 513, 637, 673 and D7.

=== Braintree ===
Braintree depot is situated on Springwood Road and was taken over from First Essex in 2013.

Braintree depot operates routes 9/A, 21, 30 and Three Rivers 38/A which is operated in conjunction with Boreham. It also operates school services 414, 417, 419, 451 and 676.

=== Great Bromley (Outstation) ===
Great Bromley Outstation primarily operates North Essex services. Maintenance takes place at Boreham.

Great Bromley operates routes 9, 105, 107. It also operates school services 101, 115, 702 and 716.
