= NIBS Buses =

English bus and coach operator

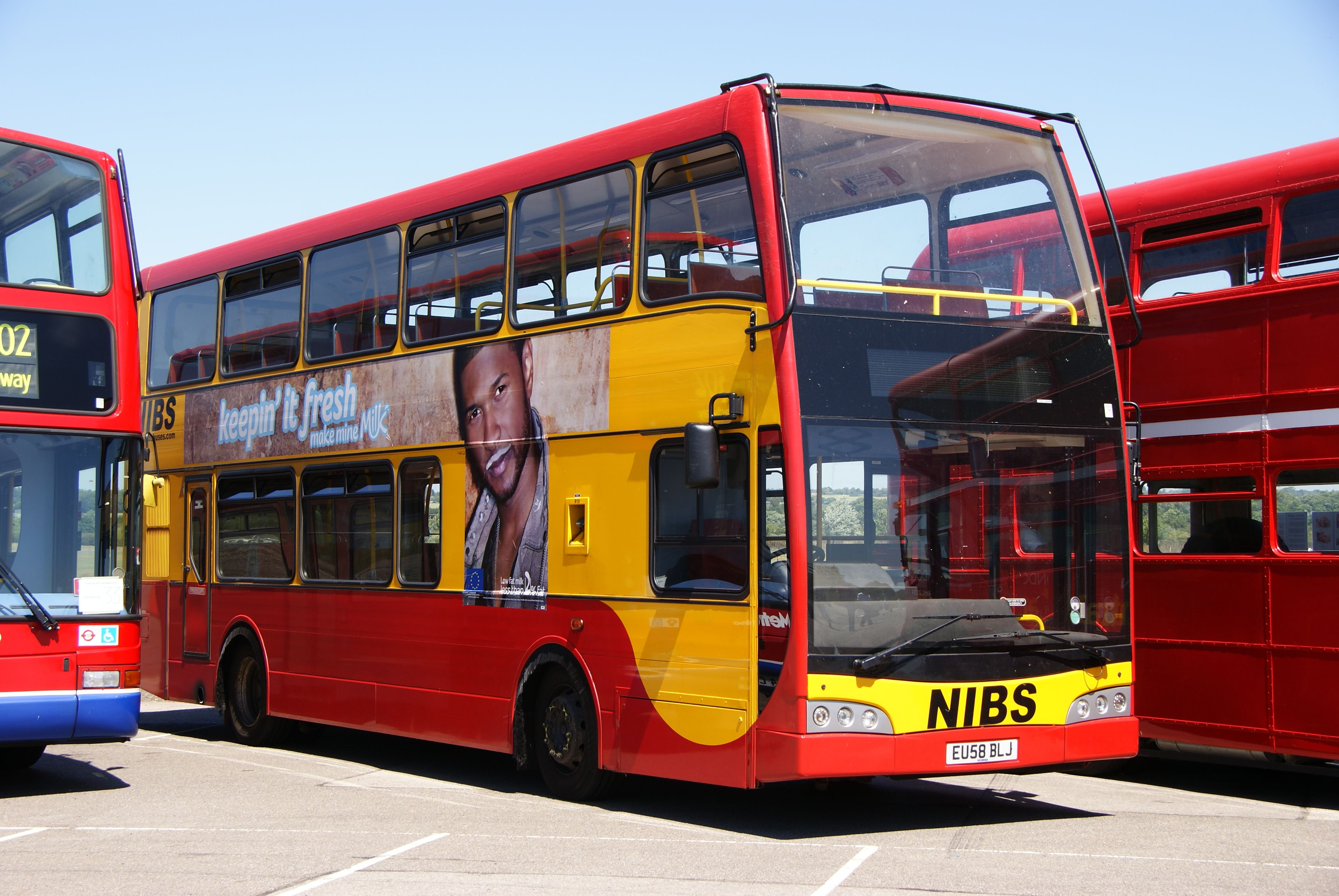
- Optare Olympus bodied Scania N270UD in July 2010
- Parent: Stephensons of Essex
- Founded: 1968
- Headquarters: Wickford
- Service area: Essex
- Routes: 31 (August 2026)
- Fleet: 39 (August 2026)
- Website: www.nibsbuses.com

NIBSBuses Limited, trading as NIBS Buses, is a bus and coach operator in Essex, England.

== History ==
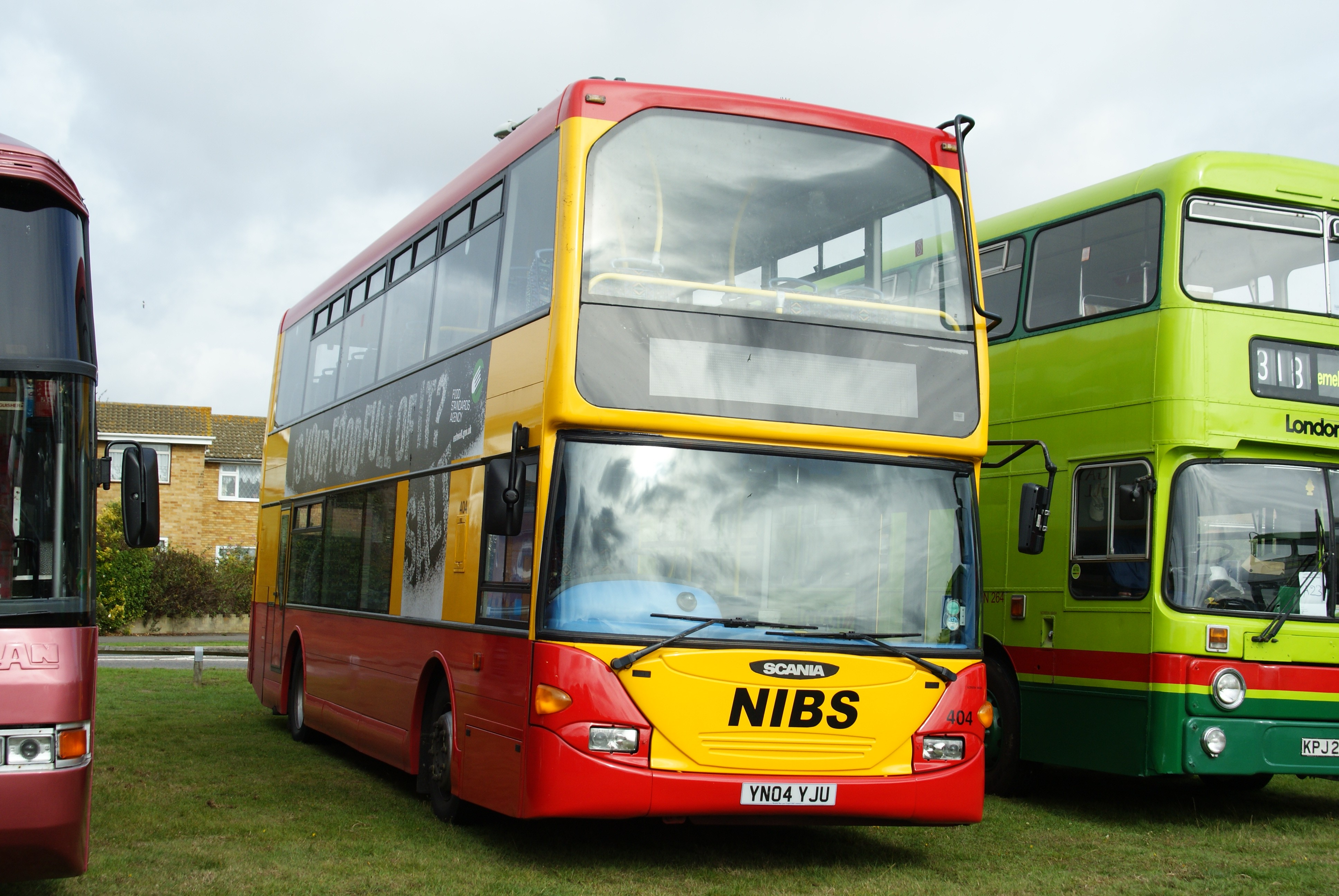
East Lancs OmniDekka bodied Scania N94UD at Canvey Island bus rally in October 2009

NIBS Buses was established as a coach charter operator in 1968 by Bill and Chris Nelson as Nelson Coaches. In 1971 Beeline Coaches of Brentwood was purchased. By 1980 it operated five vehicles. In 1984 it commenced operating routes services under the Nelsons Independent Bus Services brand to Romford Market and Southend Airport. Further bus services commenced in 1986 after deregulation.

In 2006 it was rebranded NIBS Buses. In 2018 the business was purchased by Eastern Transport Holdings with 30 vehicles. The existing brand was retained. On 17 June 2019, NIBS Buses took over Ensignbus' services in Brentwood.

== Fleet ==
In December 2019, the fleet comprised 38 vehicles.
