= Green Line Coach Station =

Coach station in London, England

Coordinates: 51.4929°N 0.1461°W

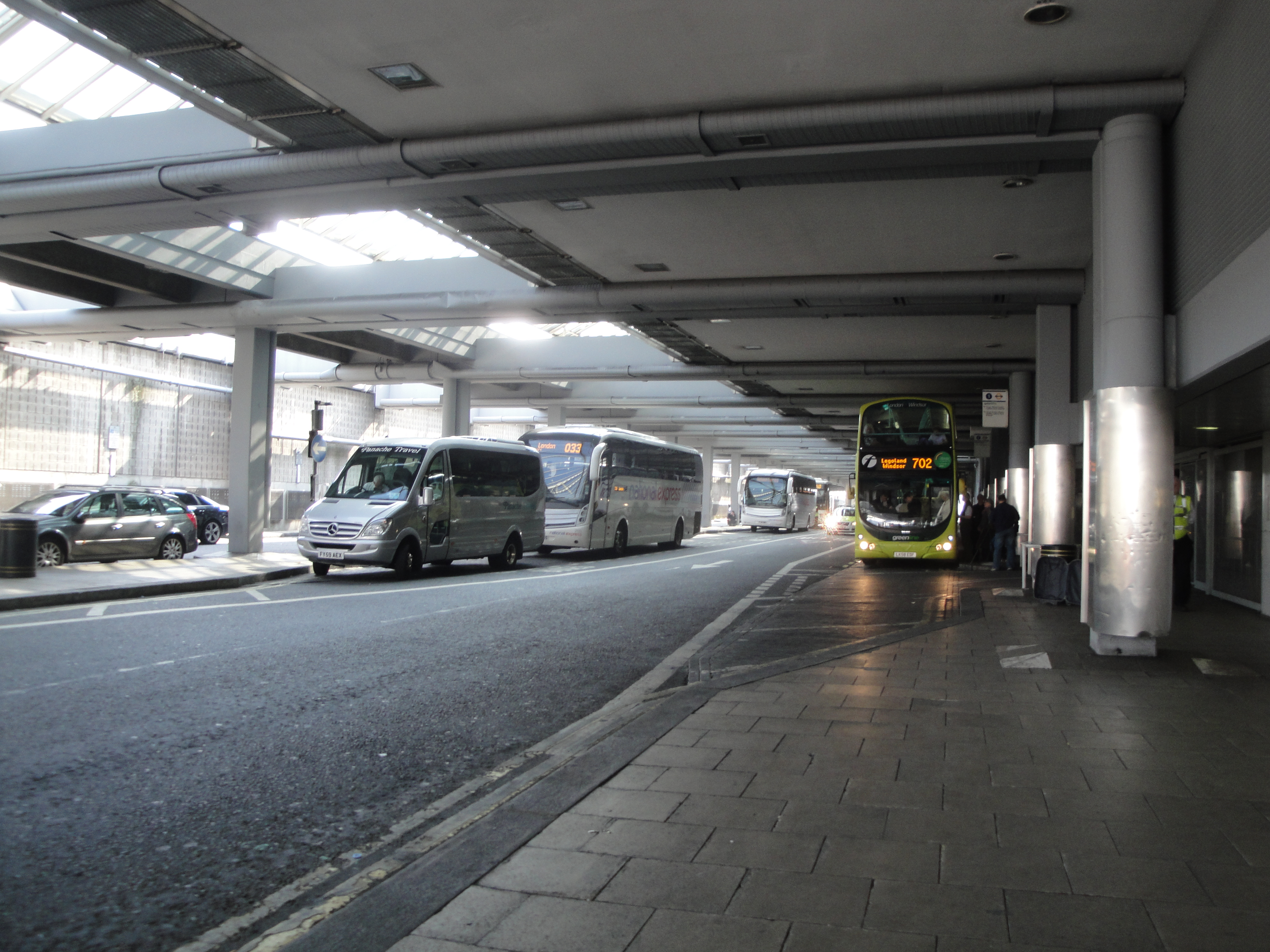
The station in 2012

Green Line Coach Station is a coach station in London, England, situated in Bulleid Way, Victoria.

The station offers regional coach services to various destinations to the north and west of London by Green Line Coaches and others, and tour buses operated by Golden Tours. It should not be confused with the nearby Transport for London owned Victoria Coach Station which offers intercity services by National Express Coaches, Megabus and others, or with the Victoria bus station which offers urban services from London Buses.

== Services ==
Reading Buses:

- 702: Legoland, Windsor and Slough to Green Line Coach Station (extended from Legoland to Bracknell and Reading at peak times)

Arriva Shires & Essex:

- 748/758/759: Hemel Hempstead to Green Line Coach Station
- 757: Leagrave, Luton and Luton Airport to Green Line Coach Station
