= Berkshire bus routes 701, 702 and 703 =

Bus routes running between Reading, Windsor, Bracknell and London

The London Line 701 and 702 Flightline 703
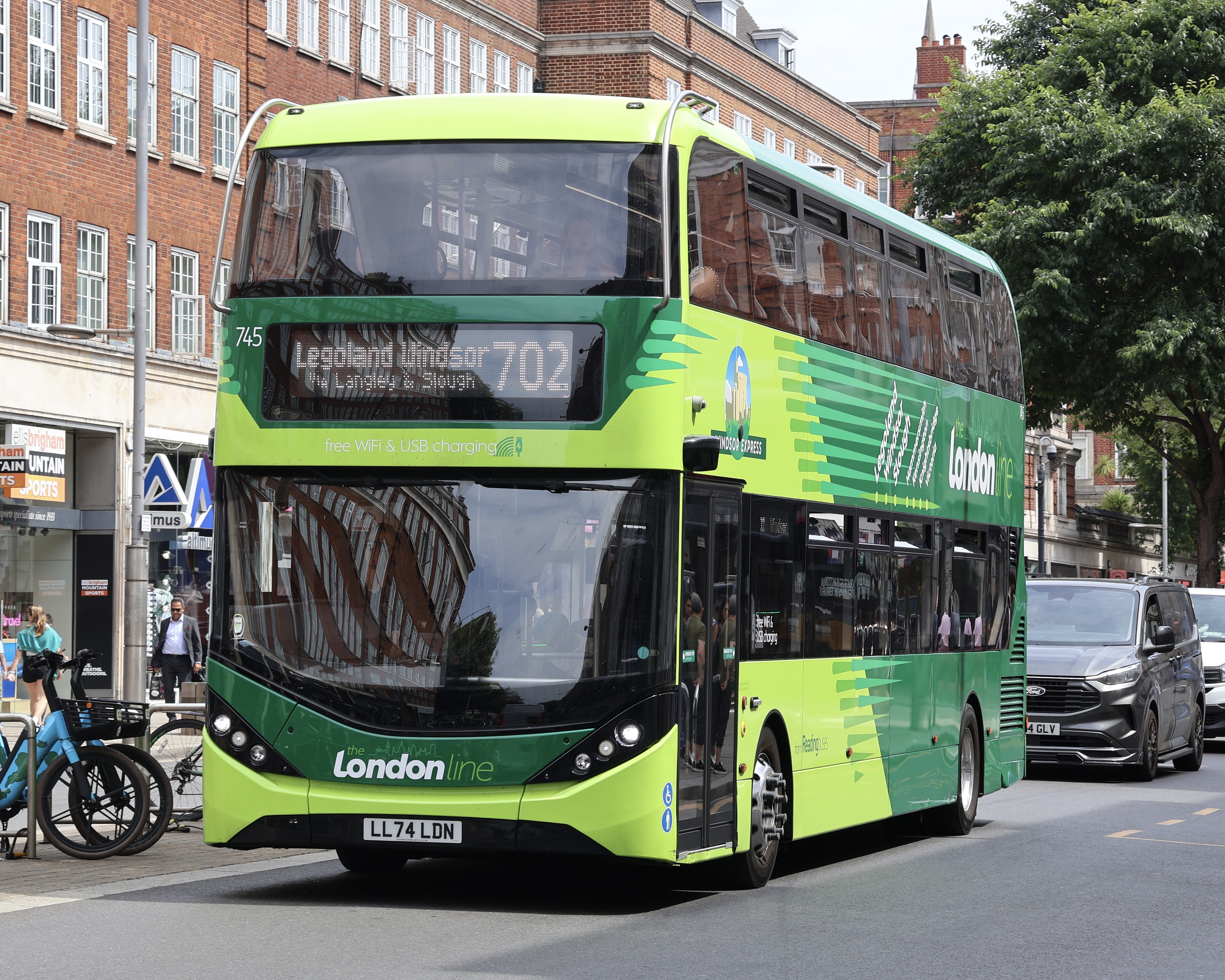
- Reading Buses The London Line branded Alexander Dennis Enviro400 City in Kensington in June 2025

Overview
- Operator: Reading Buses (The London Line 701 and 702); Thames Valley Buses (Flightline 703)
- Vehicle: Alexander Dennis Enviro400 City

Route
- Start: Reading station (701); Legoland Windsor (702); Bracknell (703)
- Via: Windsor; Slough; Hammersmith (702)
- End: Legoland Windsor (701); Green Line Coach Station (702); Heathrow Terminal 5 (703)

Service
- Operates: Monday – Sunday

The London Line 701, The London Line 702 and Flightline 703, sometimes referred to together as the Windsor Express, are a series of bus routes that connect the Berkshire towns of Bracknell, Reading, Slough and Windsor with London and Heathrow Airport. The routes have a history dating back to the 1920s, and have been operated by a number of operators under different route names and numbers over that time.

Currently these routes are either operated directly by Reading Buses (routes 701 and 702) or by that company's Thames Valley Buses subsidiary (route 703), but all carry very similar branding. All the routes serve Legoland Windsor, providing access to that attraction from both London and Berkshire, as well as the possibility of interchanging there.

== History ==
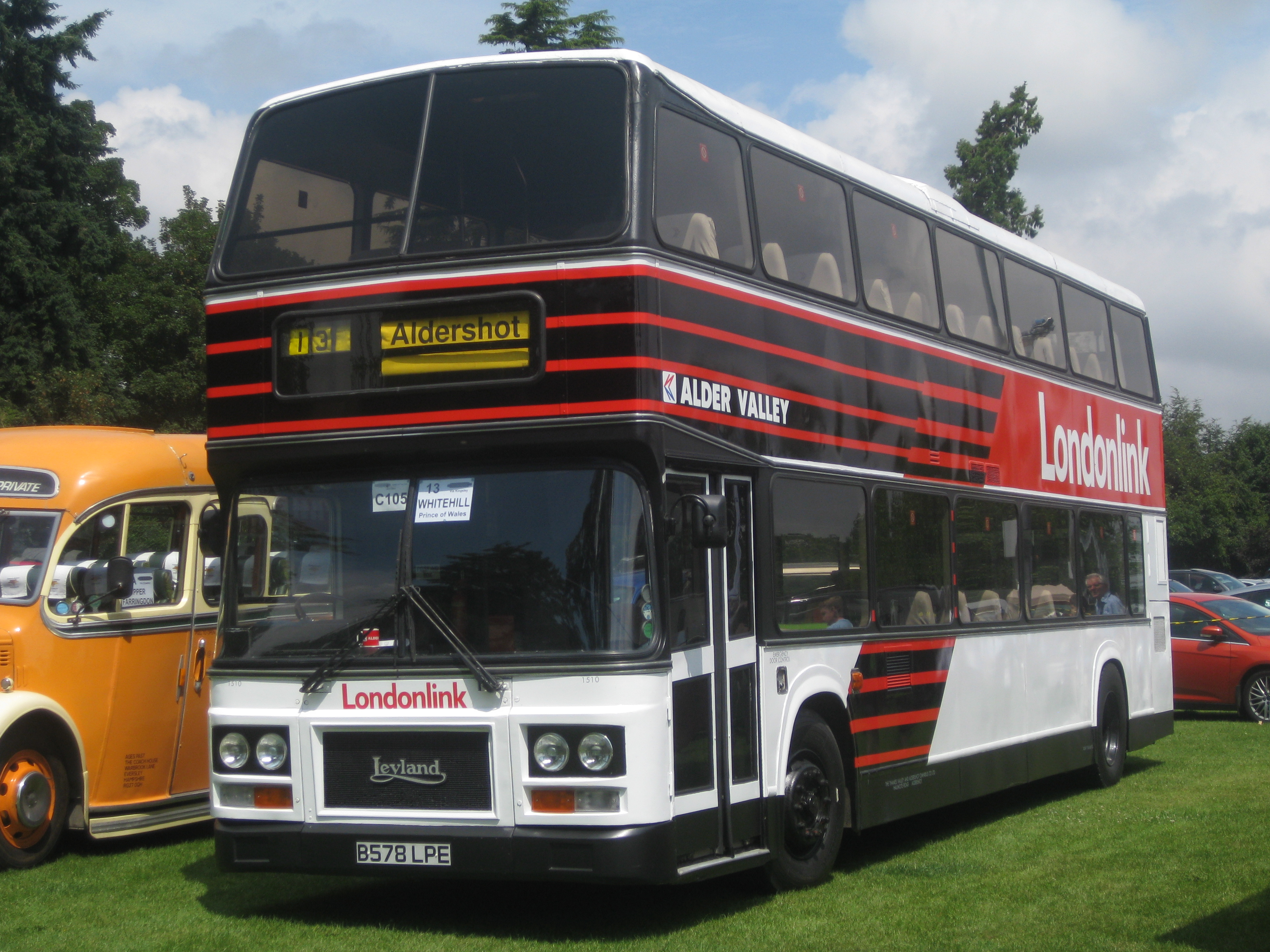
Preserved Alder Valley Londonlink Leyland Olympian at the Alton Bus Rally in 2014

Express bus services between the Thames Valley and London date back to 1927, when the Tilling Group-owned Thames Valley Traction began operating limited-stop services between Reading and London Victoria Coach Station via Wokingham, Bracknell, Ascot, Slough and Staines to rival eight bus operators running services along the Bath Road, numbered as service A. In addition, one of the rival operators' routes taken over by the Tilling Group in 1935 passed to Thames Valley the following year and was numbered as service B.

From 5 October 1980, following the deregulation of long-distance coach services arising from the Transport Act 1980, the express services were branded as Londonlink, with the Reading routes diverting to use the M4 motorway and were designated to X-prefixed numbers. The Londonlink services initially used Leyland Leopard and Leyland Tiger coaches before being upgraded to ECW-bodied Leyland Olympian double decker buses in June 1983, fitted out with high-back seating to suit its long-distance work.

The Londonlink services passed with Alder Valley North, which renamed itself as the Berks Bus Company (trading as Beeline), to Q Drive in 1987, later being sold to Centrewest in 1996, which in turn sold itself to the FirstGroup in 1997.

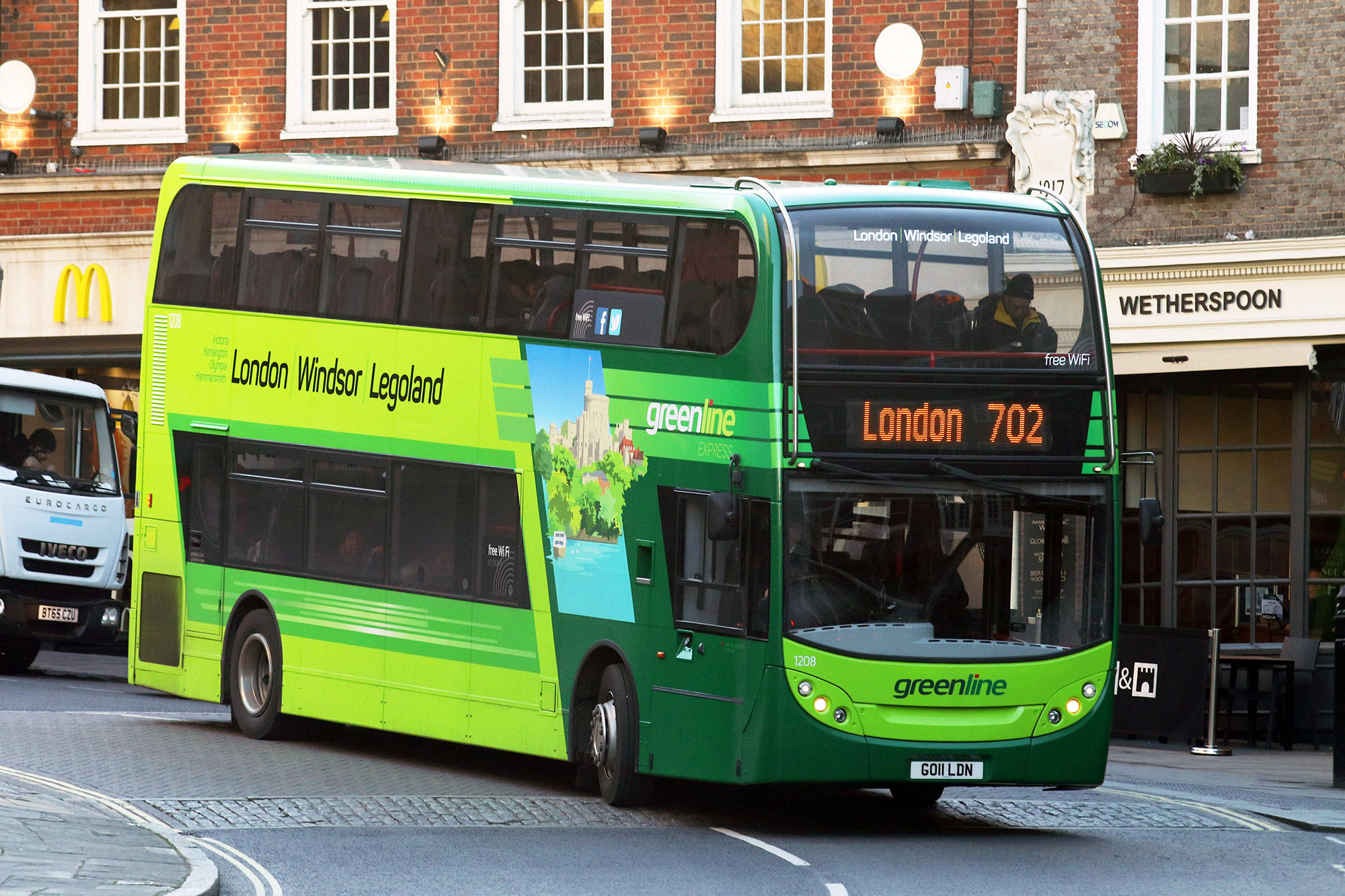
Green Line branded Alexander Dennis Enviro400 in Windsor in January 2018

In 2015, First Berkshire & Thames Valley announced plans to withdraw all their services, including route 702, from Bracknell. However, it was subsequently announced that the route would be retained.

In December 2017, Reading Buses took over the 702 route from FirstGroup. For the first day of service on 24 December, passengers could board for free and various heritage vehicles were used on the route. First had previously announced it would withdraw the route as it said it had become unsustainable due to increasing costs of operation.

On 8 May 2018, route 703 was introduced. Buses were branded as the "Royal Express" and painted in a gold and purple livery, coinciding with the wedding of Prince Harry and Meghan Markle. At the time, the routes were operated using Alexander Dennis Enviro400 MMCs.

From 2 November 2020, some early morning and late evening 702 journeys started running via the M4 between Reading and Slough.

In January 2021 route 702 was suspended due to low usage as a result of the COVID-19 lockdown.

On 24 July 2022, route 703 increased its frequency to provide a half-hourly service between Heathrow Airport and Slough, as a result of the airport's partnership. There is also now an improved hourly service between Legoland Windsor and Slough throughout the day.

In February 2023, seven 11.5 m (37.7 ft) 76-seater Alexander Dennis Enviro400 Citys were ordered to upgrade routes 702 and 703. Delivery of these buses in June 2023 coincided with Reading Buses dropping the Green Line brand for both routes, with route 702 becoming The London Line and route 703 becoming the Flightline, both under the new Windsor Express brand. 3 extra vehicles were delivered in February 2024 to complete the Flightline upgrade, coinciding with the Reading Buses' Lion 4/X4 upgrade.

In March 2024, Thames Valley Buses took over the operation of Flightline 703 from Reading Buses.

== Current routes ==
=== The London Line route 701 ===
Route 701 operates via these primary locations:

- Reading station
- Bracknell bus station
- Heatherwood Hospital
- Legoland Windsor Resort

Buses on route 701 continue beyond Legoland to and from London Victoria as route 702.

=== The London Line route 702 ===
Route 702 operates via these primary locations:

- Legoland Windsor Resort
- Windsor Parish Church
- Slough Wellington Street
- Langley
- Hammersmith Broadway
- Kensington (Olympia) station
- Knightsbridge
- Hyde Park Corner
- Green Line Coach Station for Victoria bus station and Victoria station

Limited early morning and late evening buses continue beyond Legoland to and from Reading as route 701.

=== Flightline route 703 ===
Route 703 operates via these primary locations:

- Bracknell bus station
- Heatherwood Hospital
- Brookside
- Cranbourne
- Legoland Windsor Resort
- Windsor Parish Church
- Slough Wellington Street
- Langley
- Colnbrook
- Heathrow Terminal 5
