= RailAir =

British airport bus and coach services

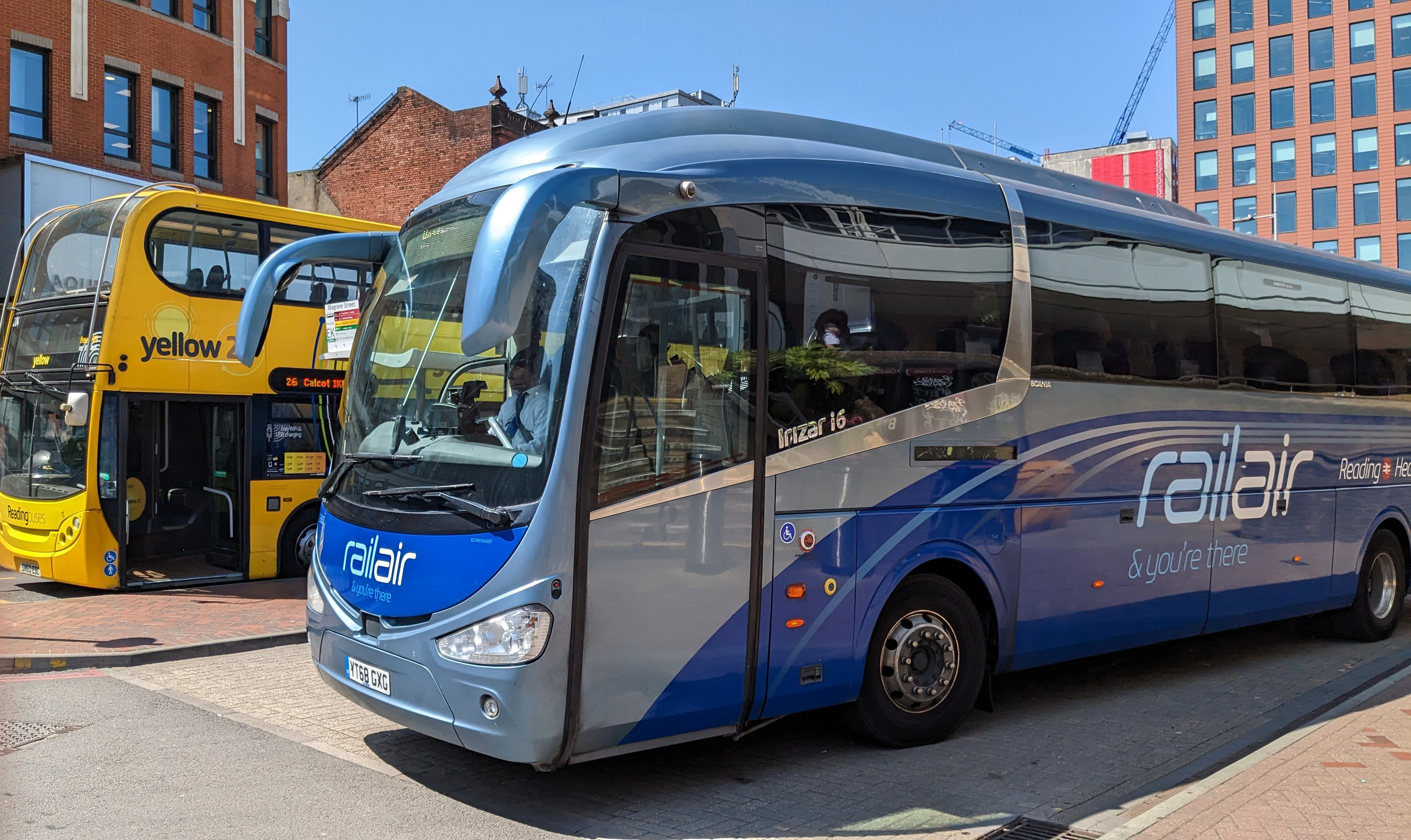
RailAir coach at Reading Station

RailAir describes a number of airport bus and coach services designed to connect the National Rail network to airports in the United Kingdom. Services are currently concentrated on Heathrow Airport, with one other from Luton Airport. RailAir services are operated as public transport services by or on behalf of train operators, where the whole journey is paid for as a through-ticket which combines the railway and bus journey, although journeys can be made using the bus only. As such, many are operated where the train and bus operator are owned by the same company.

== History ==
=== National Bus Company era ===
Railair services originated as a partnership between the nationalised bus operator, the National Bus Company, and the nationalised rail operator, British Rail, under the Railair Link brand name.

In Luton National Bus Company subsidiary Luton & District, operated a Railair Link branded shuttle bus between Luton railway station and Luton Airport, as the Luton Flyer. Luton Airport Parkway railway station has since been built closer to the airport.

From 1967, Thames Valley Traction, (later Alder Valley), operated a Railair Link coach between Heathrow and Reading station in a yellow striped livery as route X25, and later in National Bus Company coach livery. A Railair Link service was also operated by coach operator Rickards from Heathrow to Woking.

=== Post deregulation ===
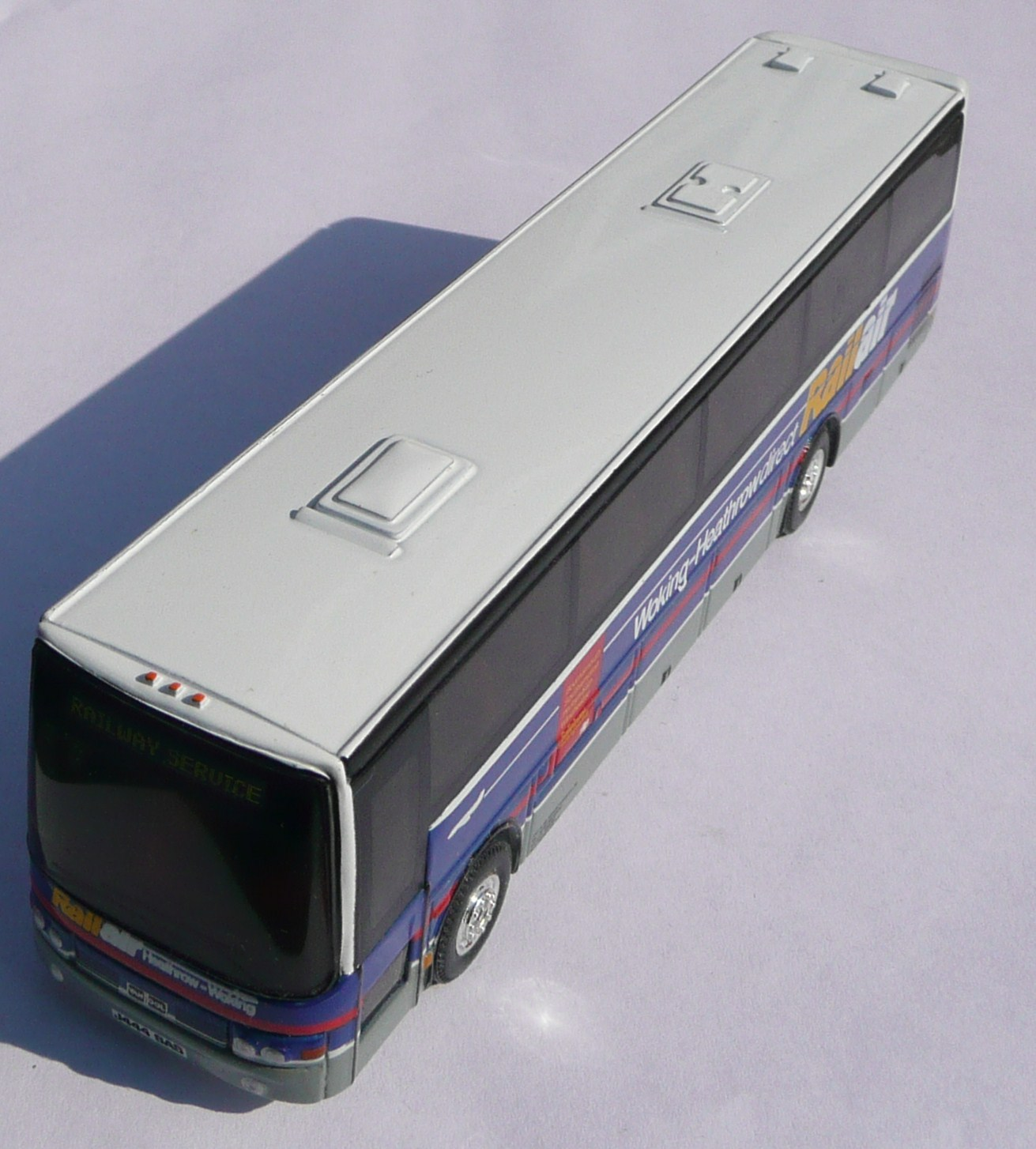
A model of a coach on the Woking RailAir service. After deregulation, the service passed to Speedlink

After bus deregulation, the existing Reading and Woking to Heathrow Railair services passed to private companies.

Privatised Alder Valley, as the Bee Line bus company, owned by Q-Drive, operated the Heathrow to Reading Railair service in bottle green liveried coaches as the Rail Air service with marketing for the onward rail links to South Wales and the West of England. When Beeline passed to FirstGroup, the Railair service was operated ultimately by First Berkshire, which in 2003 relaunched the service with Irizar Century bodied Scania K114IB coaches. The serviced operates as the FirstGroup branded service Rail Air.com.

The Woking to Heathrow service was operated by Speedlink Airport Services in a blue livery. Speedlink was later sold to National Express, which operated it in a light blue version of their 2003 livery, in conjunction with Stagecoach's South West Trains subsidiary, also with branding promoting rail connections to the South West.

In 2006 Virgin Trains West Coast, which is 49% owned by Stagecoach, introduced Virgin Trains liveried coaches for Railair links to Virgin trains services from Luton and Heathrow airports, as the Virgin Trains ExpressCoach services, operated by Stagecoach East. From 1 June 2008, the Virgin service to Heathrow was withdrawn, with passengers directed to Green Line route 724 as a replacement.

== Current services ==
RailAir is used as a generic term for these services by the public and airline operators, such as British Airways at Heathrow, and as a specific brand name of some of the services. The Reading to Heathrow RailAir bus allows connection from cities such as Bristol, Exeter, Plymouth and South Wales to Heathrow Airport without having to change at London Paddington. However, it is possible to change trains at Hayes & Harlington and go by train instead, a change at Reading being also required for this service.

With the exception of London Buses route 285, Railair services are direct express coach services, longer and in contrast to local airport buses from nearby stations and offer through-ticketing, as opposed to bus-only ticketed airport hub connected coach networks, such as National Express Airport branded services.

In 2008 National Express dropped the smile livery for a group wide re-branding, thus more normally National Express are running the route. In July 2019 First Berkshire & The Thames Valley commenced operating route RA2 from Heathrow Airport to Guildford station. In January 2020, this service was diverted to serve Woking station as well as Guildford. From 23 July 2023, First Berkshire & The Thames Valley commenced operating route RA3 from Heathrow Airport to Watford Junction Railway Station

| Brand | Number | Airport | Railway Station | Rail operator | Bus operator |
|---|---|---|---|---|---|
| Feltham Railair | 285/490 | Heathrow | Feltham | South Western Railway | London Buses (Abellio London) |
| Rail Air | RA1 (previously X25) | Heathrow | Reading | Great Western Railway | First Berkshire & The Thames Valley |
| Rail Air | RA2 | Heathrow | Guildford and Woking | South Western Railway | First Berkshire & The Thames Valley |
| Rail Air | RA3 | Heathrow | Watford Junction | Avanti West Coast | First Berkshire & The Thames Valley |

== See also ==
- British Rail brand names
- Coach transport in the United Kingdom
- Airport rail link
