= Thames Valley Buses =

British bus company

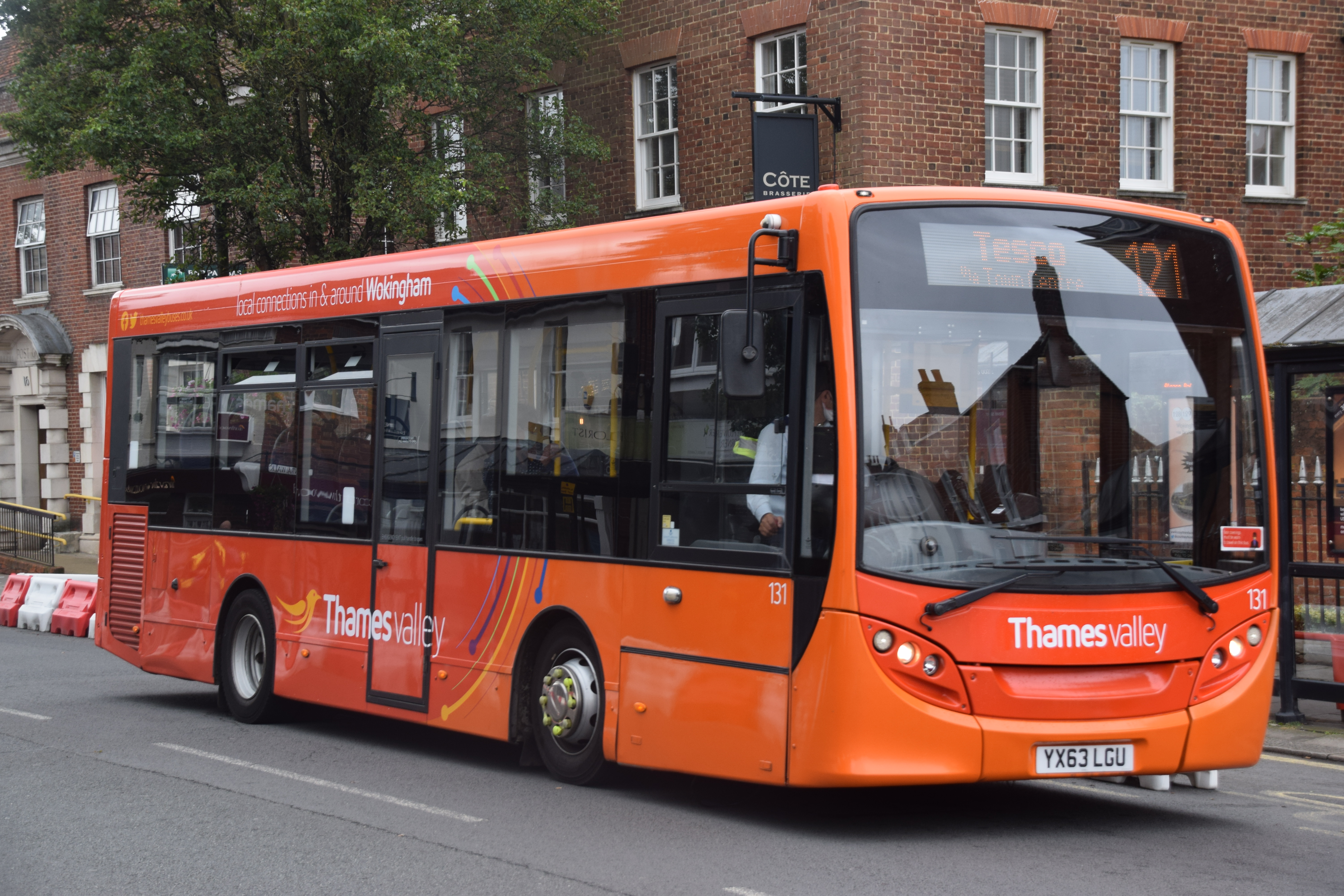
- Alexander Dennis Enviro200 in Thames Valley 'orange' livery on route 121 in September 2021
- Formerly: Courtney Buses
- Parent: Reading Buses
- Founded: 1973; 53 years ago as Courtney Buses
- Headquarters: Bracknell
- Service area: Berkshire; Surrey; Oxfordshire; Greater London; Hampshire; Buckinghamshire
- Service type: Bus services
- Routes: 33 (July 2026)
- Fleet: 55 (July 2026)
- Chief executive: Robert Williams
- Website: www.thamesvalleybuses.com

Thames Valley Buses Limited, trading as Thames Valley Buses, is a bus company based in Bracknell, England. It was known as Courtney Buses until 2021. Founded in 1973, the company operates a network of commercial and contracted local bus services and school buses in Berkshire, Surrey, Oxfordshire and small parts of Hampshire, Greater London and Buckinghamshire. In March 2019 it was purchased by Reading Buses, with the company having gradually rebranded to its current name between October 2019 and April 2021.

The company was previously known for its use of alternative fuels throughout the 2000s, having been the first bus company in the United Kingdom to operate a bus run on 100% soya oil.

== History ==
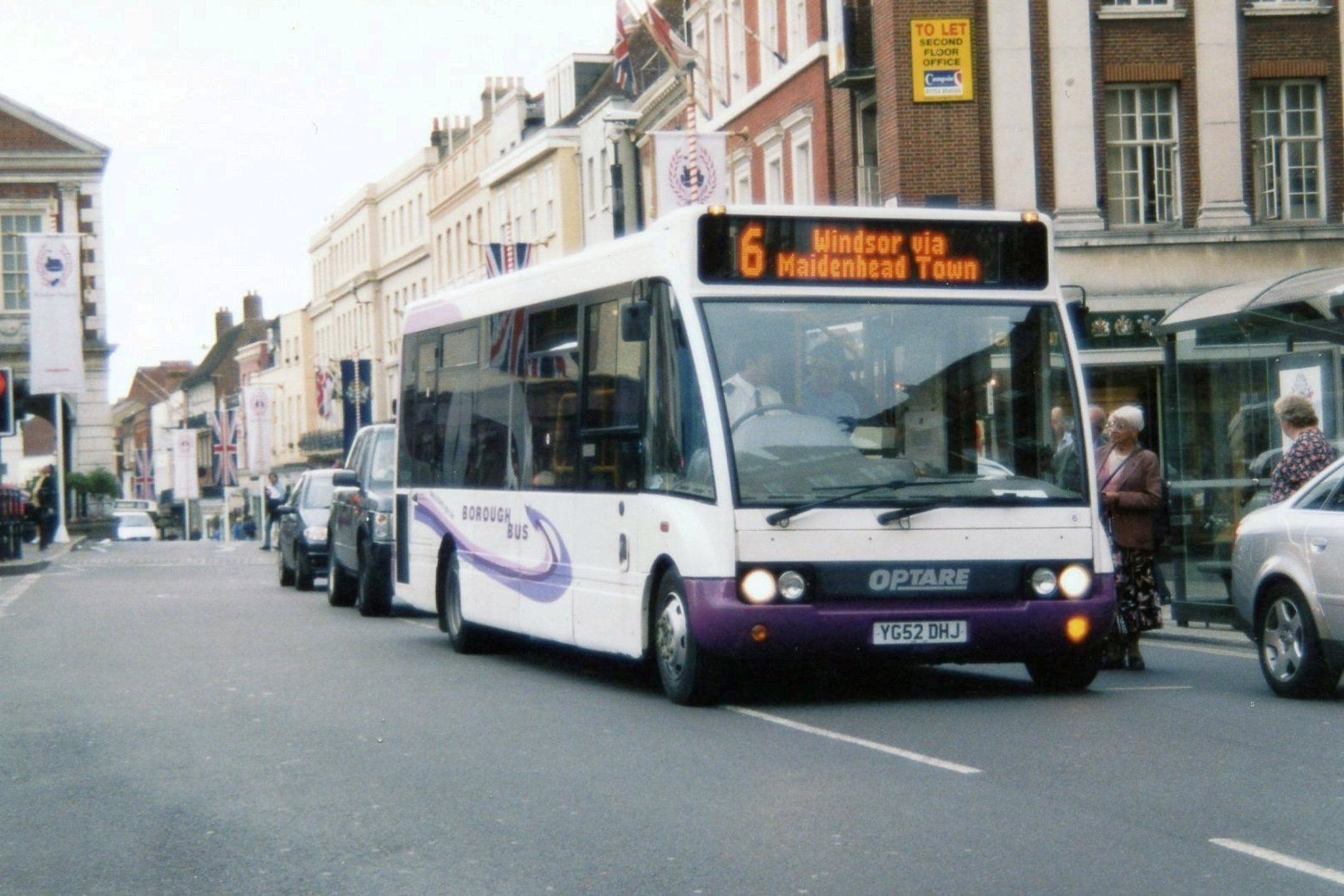
Optare Solo in Borough Bus livery on route 6 in Windsor in August 2006

The previous Courtney Buses logo

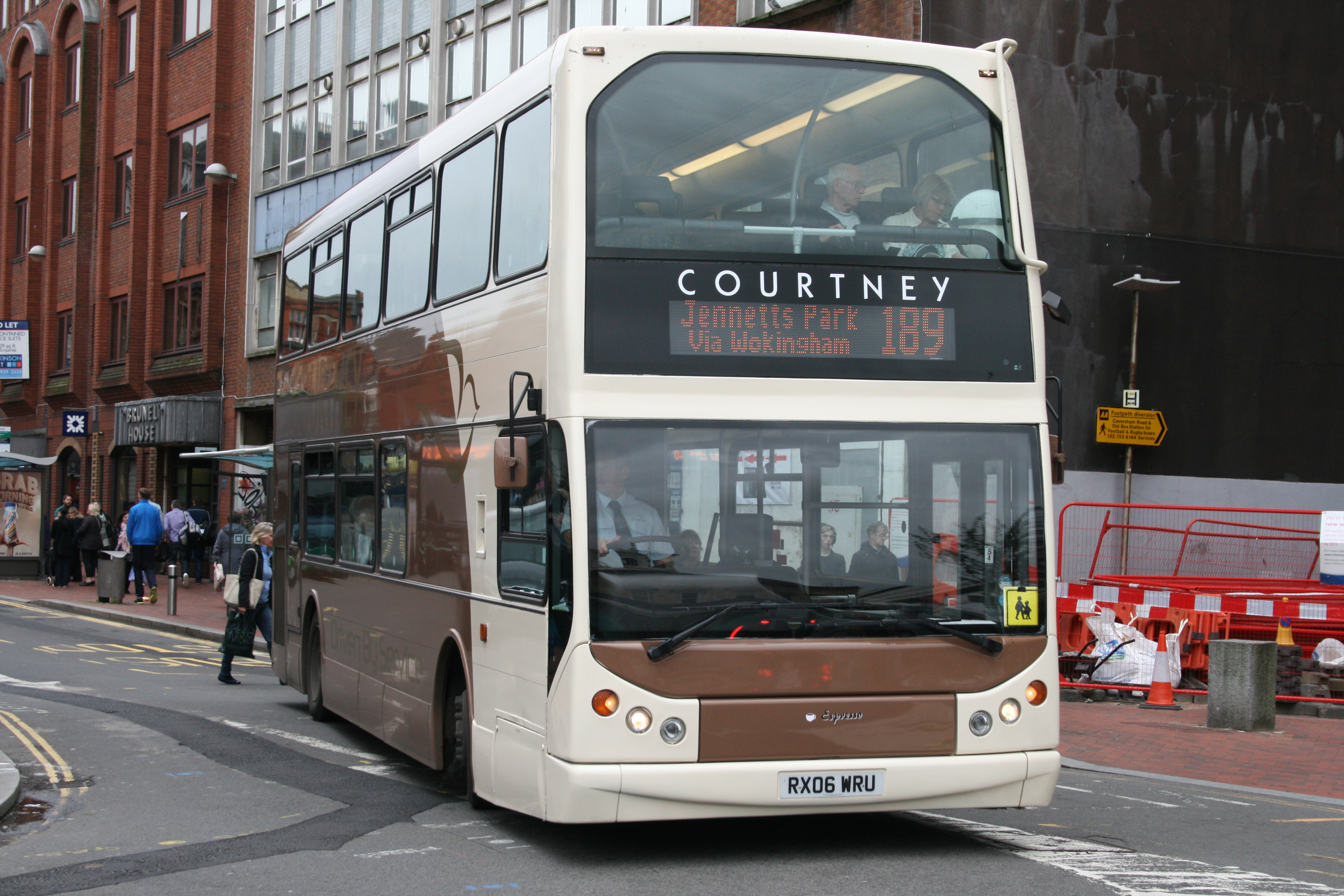
East Lancs Myllennium Lowlander bodied VDL DB250 at Reading station in October 2014

The Courtney Group was formed in 1973 as a taxi hire firm in Bracknell by William Courtney-Smith, and moved into coach hire in the 1980s. In 2000 Courtney Coaches commenced its first local route, 53 (Wexham Park Hospital - Maidenhead - Bracknell). This was taken over by First Berkshire & The Thames Valley in 2003. The company expanded dramatically in January 2004 when all seven local routes in Maidenhead were taken over from First Berkshire.

In September 2006 Courtney Coaches had its licence revoked by the Traffic Commissioner. An appeal was launched, operations continued and the decision overturned by the end of 2006. Between 2005 and 2007, a park & ride service was operated between Maidenhead town centre and a temporary site at Stafferton Way. The Stafferton Way site had been used to provide replacement parking during a period in which a town centre car park was shut.

In October 2007 the company introduced a unique ticketing system, ETMSS, which uses mobile computer technology to replace fare charts and reporting software with one computerised system. Other features include the ability to modify fares from anywhere using the internet, GPS tracking of individual buses and reduced insurance costs as a result of this, and the ability to calculate fares, cash exchanges and refunds. The cost of installation was reportedly paid back within the first 12 months.

The routes in Maidenhead were changed significantly in early 2009. However, changes to the stopping pattern on route 6 (Maidenhead — Windsor) received criticism from some residents and were further changed in April 2009.

Further expansion came in January 2009, when the shuttle service between Didcot Parkway station and Milton Park was expanded from one bus to two using a new low-floor double-deck vehicle at a cost of £175,000. Over 400 passes for the service were issued to workers prior to its introduction.

Courtney moved its depot from Downmill Road, Bracknell to Hogwood Lane Industrial Estate in Finchampstead in late 2010. The company announced a change of trading name to Courtney Buses in late 2011. In November 2011 Courtney began operation of a new Christmas park & ride service in Windsor. There was more expansion during 2014, when four contracted routes in the Bracknell area, along with nine contracted routes in the Wokingham area, were taken over by Courtney following the withdrawal of Thames Travel.

In July 2015, Courtney Buses took over the operation of nine routes in Bracknell previously operated by First Berkshire & The Thames Valley.

In December 2017, it was announced that Reading Buses was to take on three services withdrawn by First Berkshire & The Thames Valley in the Slough area. A fourth route was later added. The Thames Valley Buses name, historically associated with Thames Valley Traction, was used for the new services. Operation began on 20 January 2018.

In January 2018, Courtney Buses expanded into Slough after taking over four routes in the area, which until that point, had been operated by First Berkshire & the Thames Valley.

=== Reading Buses ownership ===
In March 2019, the business was purchased by Reading Buses.

In November 2019, Courtney Buses began to merge gradually with Thames Valley Buses, a process which was completed in April 2021, with the whole company being renamed as Thames Valley. The first routes to receive the new branding included route 5 from Slough-Cippenham and the Green Line route 703 from Bracknell-Ascot-Windsor-Slough-Heathrow Airport. Courtney-branded routes in the Windsor and Slough areas, including routes 2 (Dedworth-Windsor-Slough), 10 (Dedworth-Datchet-Wraysbury-Heathrow Airport), 10A (Slough-Datchet-Wraysbury-Heathrow Airport, formerly service 11), 10S (Slough-Churchmead School) and 15 (Slough-Eton-Eton Wick-Maidenhead) were also amalgamated into the Thames Valley brand. A new simplySlough & Windsor fare zone was also introduced, including Heathrow Airport but excluding Legoland.

In February 2020, a new Heathrow circular route 459 (via Colnbrook, Iver and Langley) was launched.

The Thames Valley Buses livery consists of a grey base with a green ‘valley of colour’ for routes in the Slough area, with lilac for the Heathrow routes, although the latter has been withdrawn (except for a 10A journey from Slough to Churchmead School during term time) due to cuts in bus funding from Heathrow.

In August 2020, the Thames Valley brand was introduced to the Wokingham area, with 3 Alexander Dennis Enviro200s transferred from Reading Buses in their existing ‘Little Orange’ livery, but with the branding changed to ‘Thames Valley Wokingham’. With sister company Newbury & District's Bombay Sapphire contract ending in September of that year, it released an Enviro200 MMC to return to the Thames Valley fleet, receiving the finalised grey and orange livery for the Wokingham area routes. Reading Buses’ simplyBracknell & Wokingham Zone was expanded to cover the Courtney/Thames Valley routes in the respective areas, along with a new simplySouth Bracknell for the Southern Bracknell housing estates prior to this in January of that year.

In October 2020, the Thames Valley brand was launched in Maidenhead, with a grey and purple livery. At the same time, duplicated numbers in the area were resolved, as services 4 (clockwise) and 4A (anti-clockwise) (Maidenhead-Paley Street-Shurlock Row-Waltham St Lawrence) were renumbered 234 and 235 respectively, as First Berkshire & the Thames Valley also operate a bus service numbered as 4 in the town, along with there being two service 5's at Courtney/Thames Valley Buses. This resulted in the Maidenhead service 5, which operates to Farmers Way via Wootton Way Shops, being renumbered as the 3. A new, expanded simplyMaidenhead zone was also introduced.

In April 2021, services 10 and 459 were withdrawn due to Heathrow Airport Holdings cutting funding for buses, as a result of the COVID-19 pandemic, therefore the routes were deemed to no longer be sustainable to operate. However, term time journeys from Slough to Churchmead school for pupils at the school only, will continue to operate as the 10A. The Thames Valley name was also applied across the entire company. Thames Valley Buses have also won the tender for the evening and Sunday journeys on route 12 (Slough-Burnham-Priory Estate) from Slough Borough Council, to supplement First Berkshire & the Thames Valley's Monday-Saturday daytime services.

== Alternative fuels ==
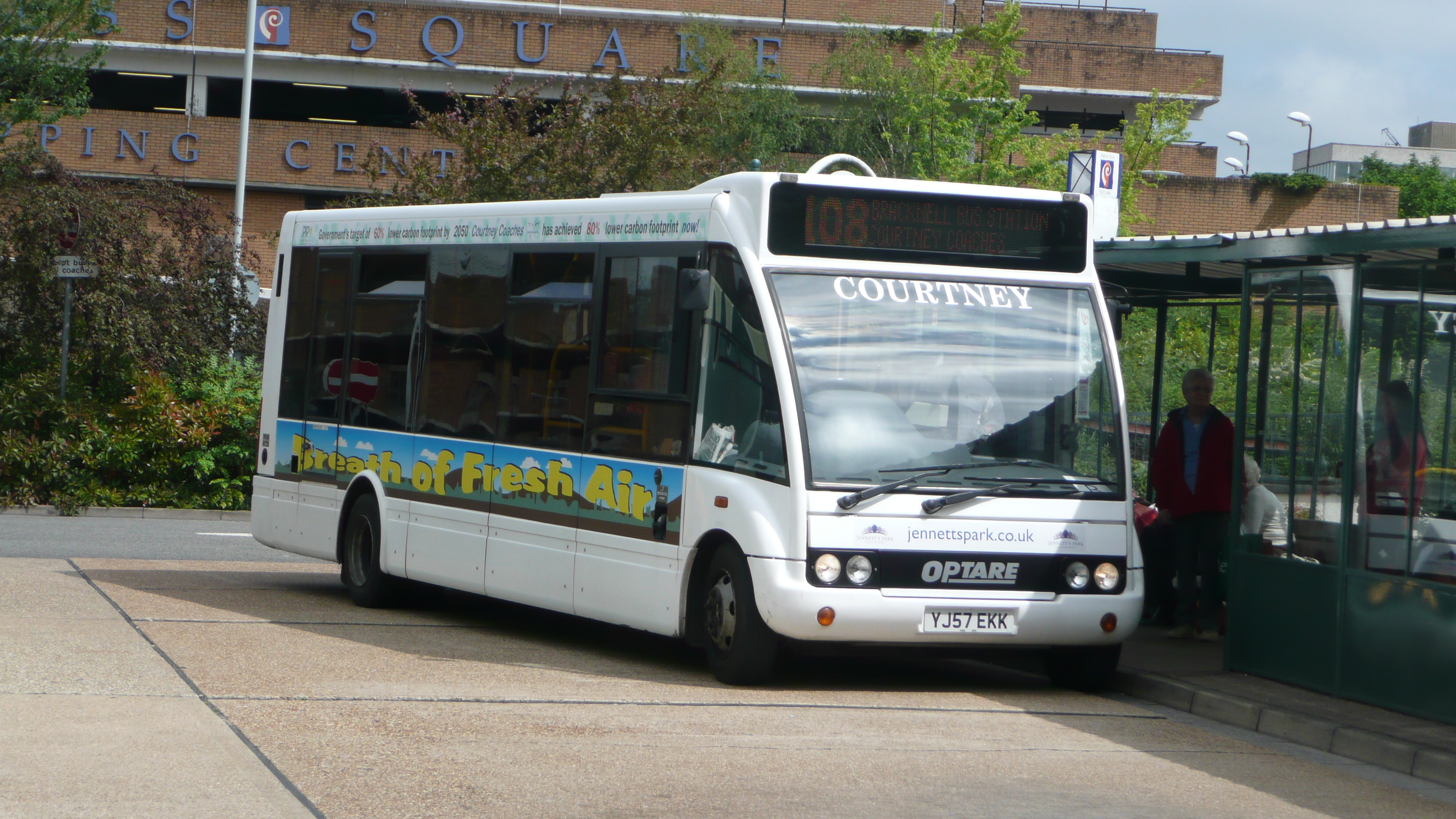
Optare Solo converted to run on vegetable oil at Bracknell bus station in June 2010

In 2002 Courtney Coaches became the first bus company in Britain to operate a bus on 100% soya oil. Abingdon based company Regenatec converted an Optare Solo minibus to operate on the fuel, which gained the company appearances on Working Lunch and in The Daily Telegraph. The cost of conversion was around £3,500. Fuel savings of around 80% were reported, and this cost was paid back in eight months. In March 2007 Courtney director Bill Courtney-Smith and Regenatec director Mike Lawton were invited to 10 Downing Street by Prime Minister Tony Blair to demonstrate another converted vehicle at an environmental presentation. Bill Courtney-Smith later bought half shares in Regenatec when the company experienced financial trouble in early 2009.

In May 2012 it was announced that as part of the government's Green Bus Fund initiative, Courtney had received funding to purchase two double-deck Hybrid electric buses.

As of July 2026, Thames Valley's entire fleet consists of standard modern Diesel buses.

== Current routes ==
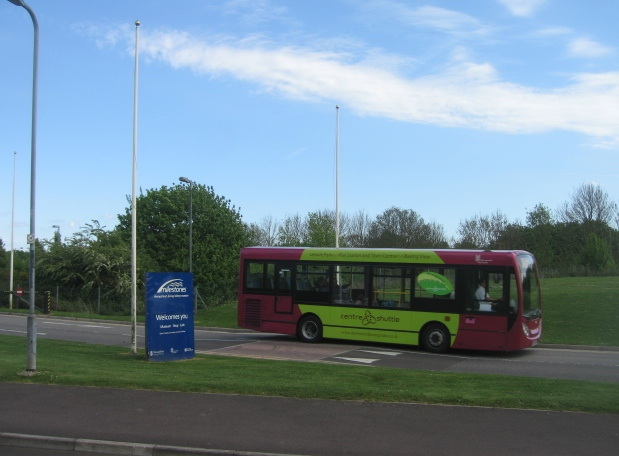
Alexander Dennis Enviro200 Dart in Basingstoke Centre Shuttle livery at Basingstoke Leisure Park in May 2009

Thames Valley Buses operate a number of local routes in the towns of Slough, Maidenhead, Wokingham and Bracknell; longer-distance routes take its buses to Windsor, Henley-on-Thames, Reading, Camberley and Heathrow Airport. As of July 2026, The company also runs a contract service for Foundation Park in Maidenhead. The company previously operated contract services for The Heights in Weybridge (suspended during COVID-19), Chineham Park, and Sony in Basingstoke (suspended during COVID-19). The company also formerly ran contracts for Bedfont Lakes, until the contract was lost in late 2018 to London United and Bombay Sapphire until the current parent company, Reading Buses transferred the contract to their Newbury and District division (the service was withdrawn in September 2020 due to COVID causing dwindling visitor numbers and users) and Milton Park, which was lost to Thames Travel in late 2020.

== Fleet ==
As of July 2026, the fleet consists of 55 buses.

Since local bus service work began, the predominant type in the fleet had been the Optare Solo, although other vehicles were also owned. However, in recent times, the fleet has shifted to predominantly Alexander Dennis vehicles. Two notable buses delivered in 2006 were the only Alexander Dennis Enviro300s with East Lancs Esteem bodywork, which left the fleet in 2011. Two Optare Tempos powered by 100% pure plant oil, the first 12m single-deckers to run on this fuel, were ordered in 2010. They have since departed the fleet in late 2020. Since Reading Buses ownership, the fleet has consisted almost entirely of Alexander Dennis Enviro 200 and 400 vehicles, including their MMC and City variants.

== See also ==
- List of bus companies in the United Kingdom
