= First Berkshire & The Thames Valley =

Bus operator in the United Kingdom

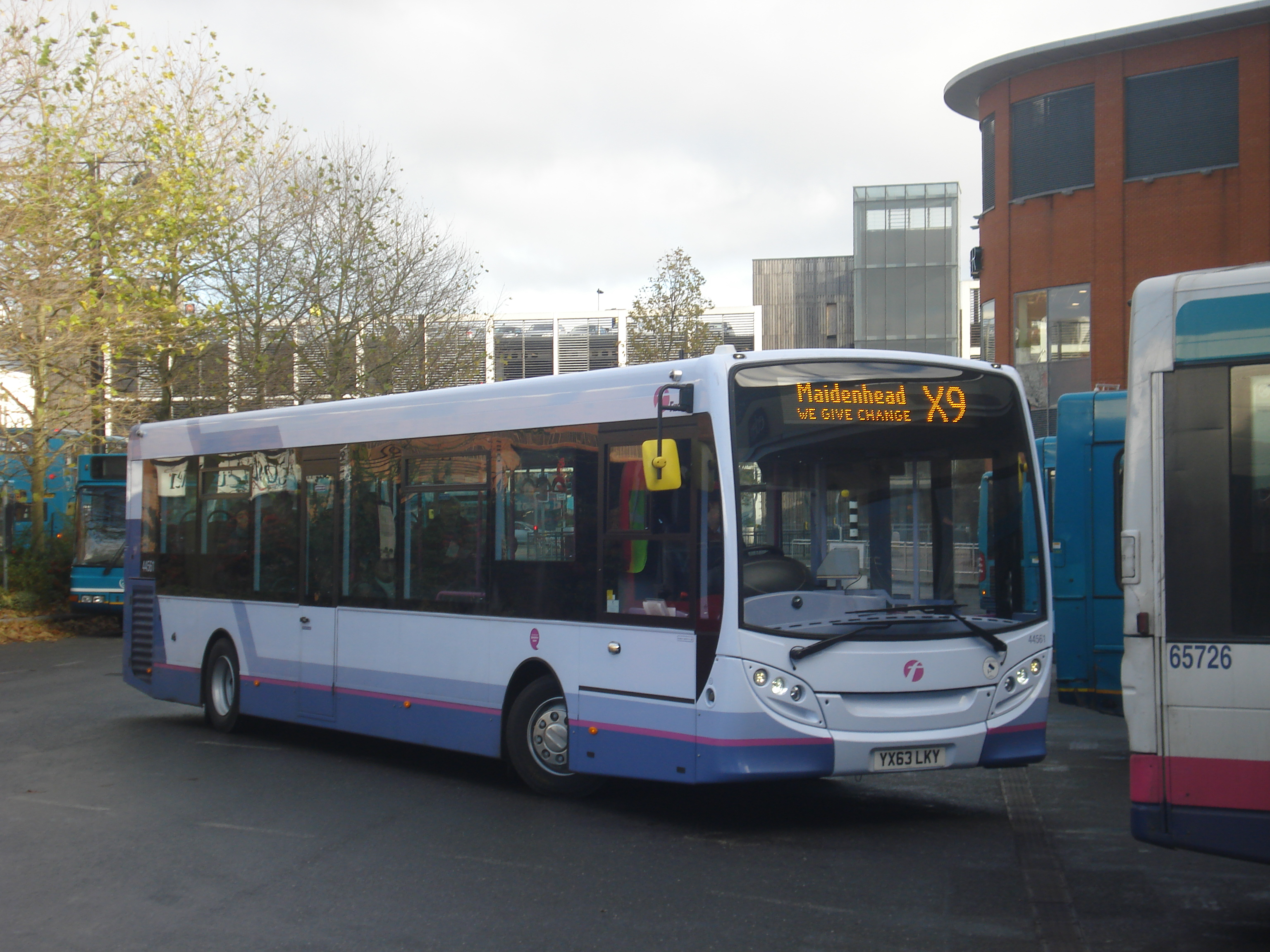
- Alexander Dennis Enviro200 at High Wycombe Eden bus station in November 2013
- Parent: FirstGroup
- Founded: October 1986
- Headquarters: Fareham
- Locale: Slough
- Service type: Bus services
- Routes: 9 (June 2024)
- Destinations: Slough; Heathrow Airport; Windsor
- Depots: 2
- Fleet: 53 (June 2024)
- Website: www.firstbus.co.uk/berkshire-thames-valley/

First Beeline Buses Limited, trading as First Berkshire & The Thames Valley, is a bus operator providing services in and around Slough. It is a subsidiary of FirstGroup.

== History ==
Former logo used by the subsidiary between 2023 and 2024

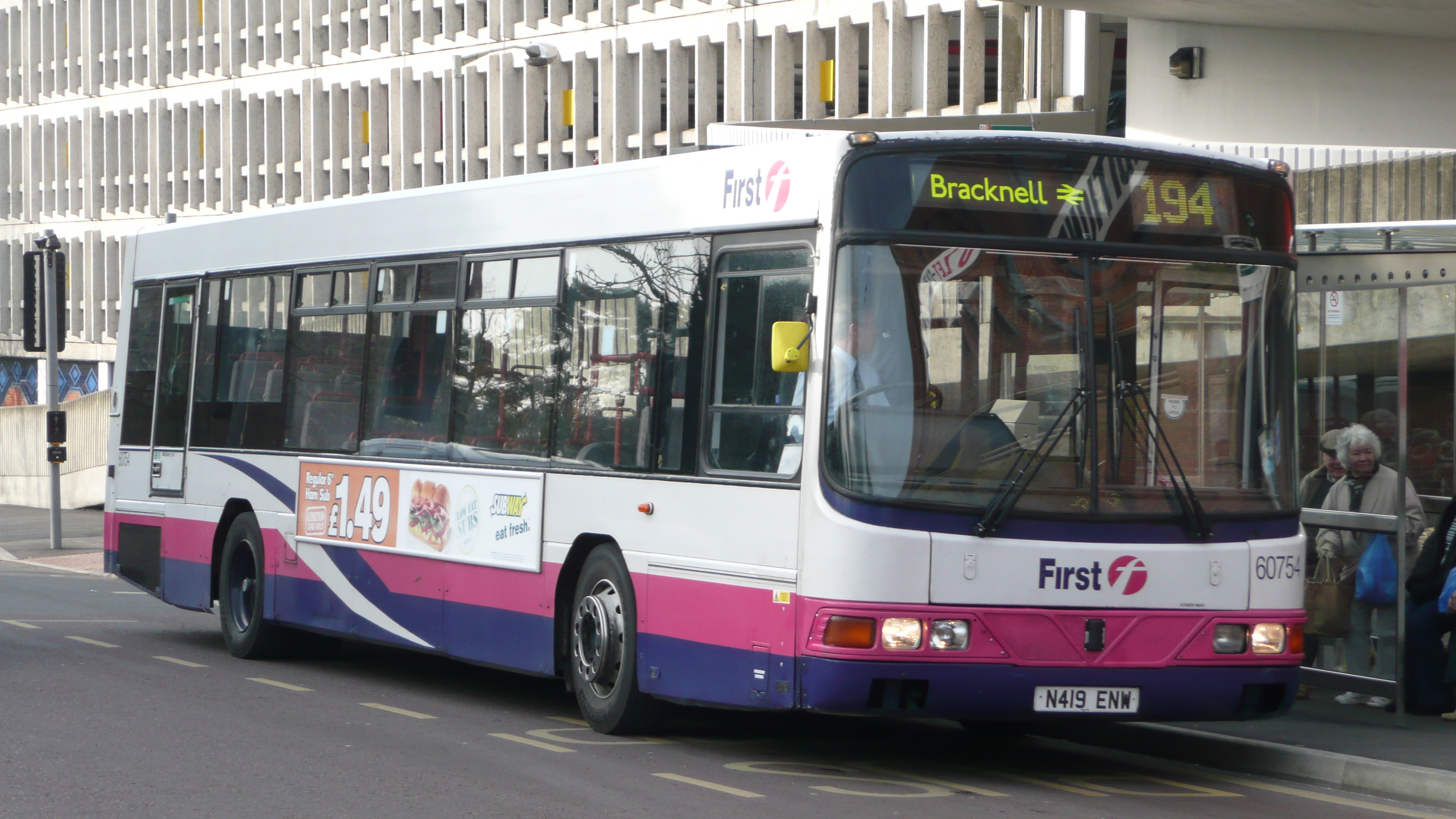
Wright Axcess-Ultralow bodied Scania L113CRB in Camberley in 2009

In January 1986 Alder Valley North Limited, later renamed, The Berks Bucks Bus Company took over the Bracknell, High Wycombe, Maidenhead, Newbury, Reading and Wokingham operations of Alder Valley as part of the preparation for privatisation of the National Bus Company, trading as "Beeline" once the name was changed in October 1986. In late 1987 The Berks Bucks Bus Company was sold to Q Drive.

In 1990 the High Wycombe operations were sold to the Oxford Bus Company, and in 1992 the Reading and Newbury operations were sold to Reading Buses. In 1993 Beeline purchased the Slough operations of Luton & District Transport, until 1986 the Slough depot of London Country Bus Services and later part of the London Country North West division.

In March 1996 Beeline was sold to CentreWest who in turn was sold to FirstGroup in March 1997. Initially trading as First Beeline, in 2001 it was rebranded as First Berkshire & The Thames Valley.

Following the loss of nine Bracknell Forest Council supported services to Courtney Buses on 13 July 2015 and the sale of route 90 Bracknell to Reading to Reading Buses on 26 July 2015, the Bracknell garage closed on 28 August 2015.

In April 2023, the company was rebranded to First Beeline.

In December 2024, following the return to a national identity by FirstGroup, First Beeline returned to trading as "First Berkshire & The Thames Valley".

== Services ==
First Berkshire & The Thames Valley currently operates bus services in and around Slough and to surrounding areas including Heathrow Airport, Maidenhead and High Wycombe. The company also operates the RailAir coach services connecting Heathrow Airport with surrounding major National Rail stations.

The company were the primary operator of services in and around Maidenhead until 2004 when most local services were withdrawn. These services are now operated by Thames Valley Buses.

The company also formerly operated the Green Line branded routes 702 and 703 between London, Heathrow Airport, Slough, Windsor, Legoland and Bracknell. Operation of these services transferred to Reading Buses in December 2017.

=== Bus services ===
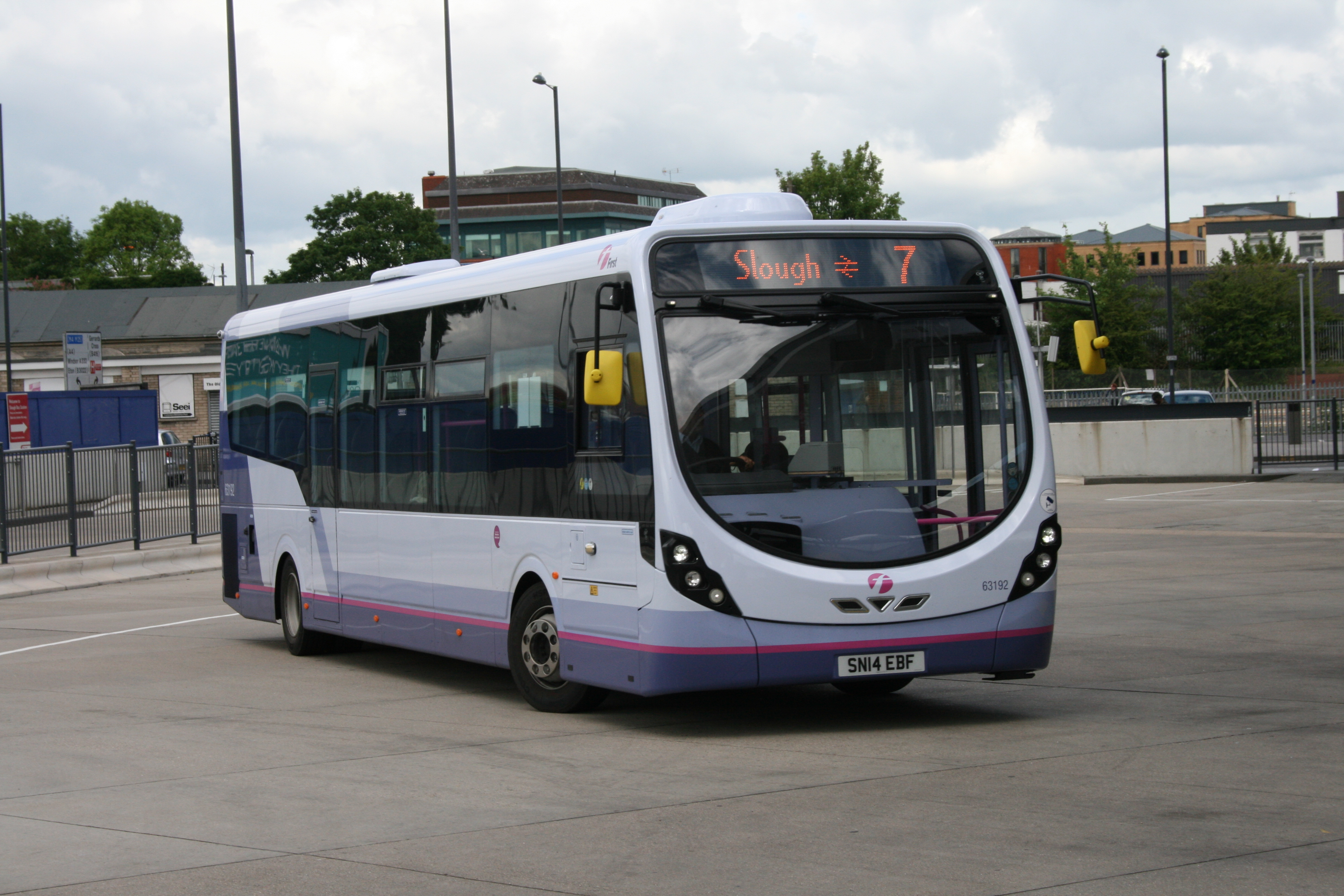
A First Beeline Wright StreetLite in Slough bus station in 2014

First Berkshire & The Thames Valley currently operate the following bus services:

Route	Start	End
3	Slough	Uxbridge
6	Wexham Park Hospital	Burnham
7	Britwell	Heathrow Terminal 5 (Note: Limited early morning buses extend to and from Heathrow Central)
7X	Britwell	Heathrow Central bus station
8	Slough	Heathrow Terminal 5
A4	Cippenham	Heathrow Central bus station
M40	High Wycombe	Uxbridge
X74	High Wycombe	Uxbridge

=== RailAir coach services ===
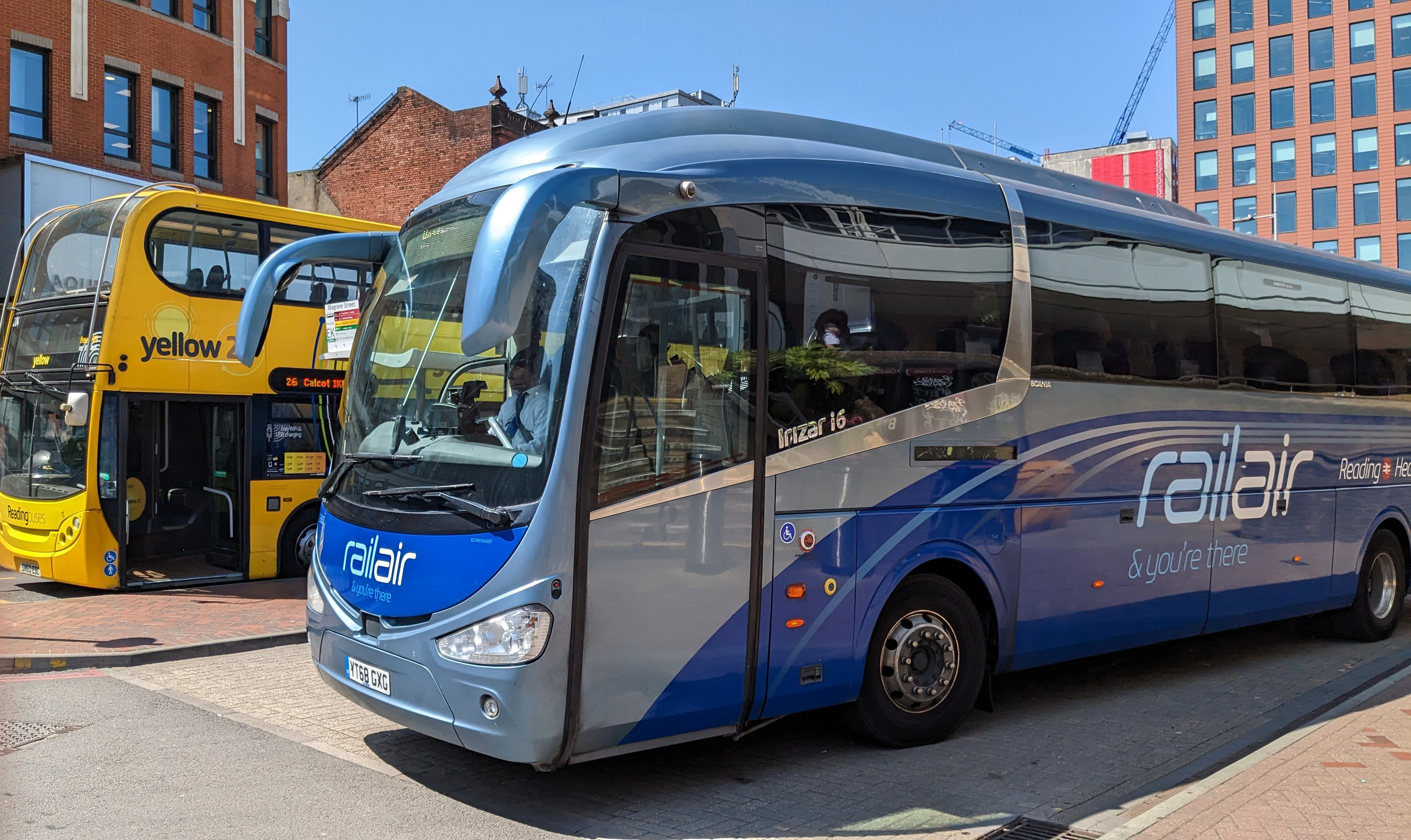
A RailAir branded coach on route RA1 at Reading station

First Berkshire & The Thames Valley currently operate the following RailAir branded coach services:

Route	Start	End
RA1	Reading	Heathrow Terminal 3
RA2	Guildford	Heathrow Terminal 3
RA3	Watford	Heathrow Terminal 3

== Gallery ==
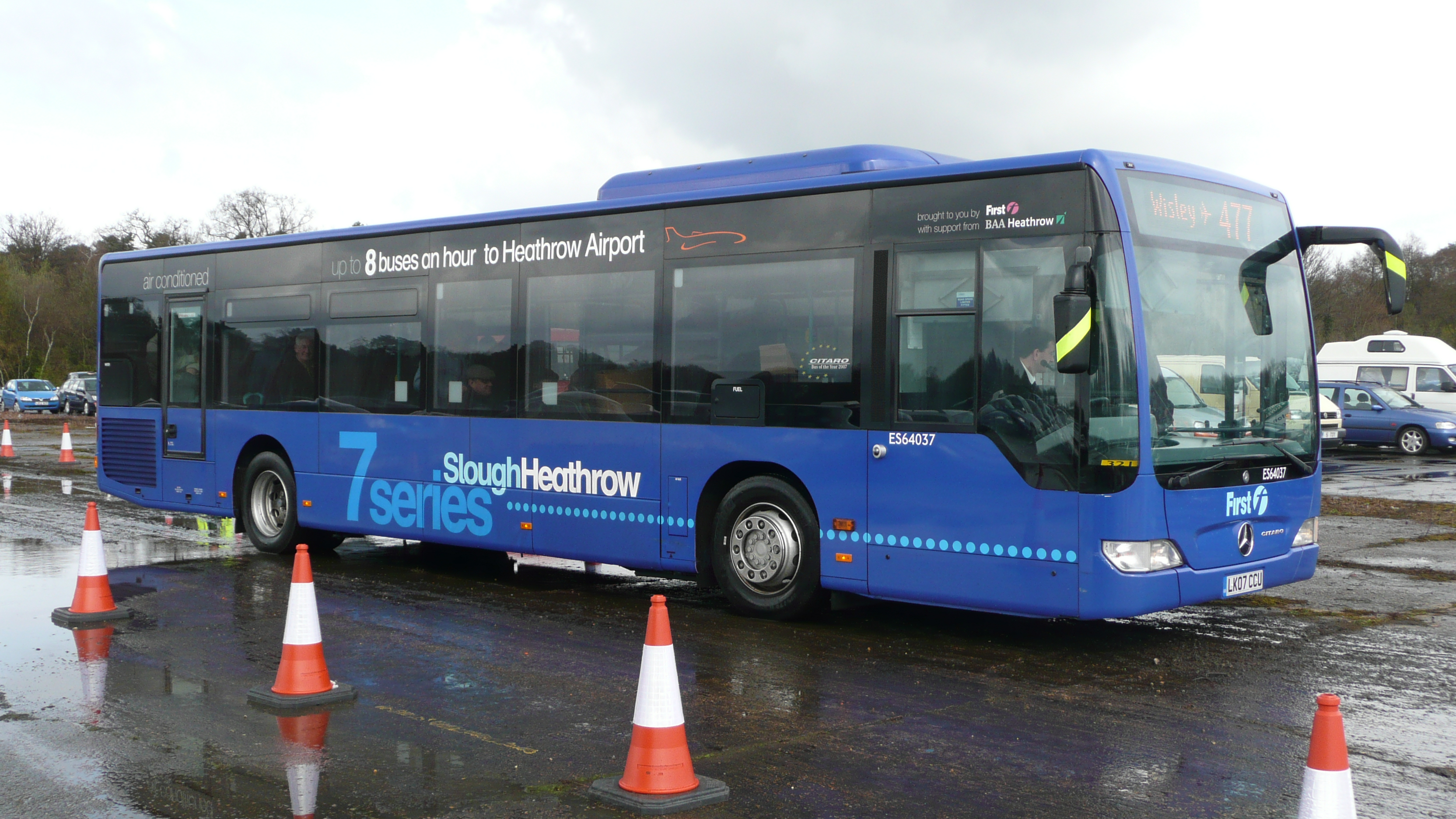
Heathrow 7 series liveried Mercedes-Benz O530 Citaro in April 2008

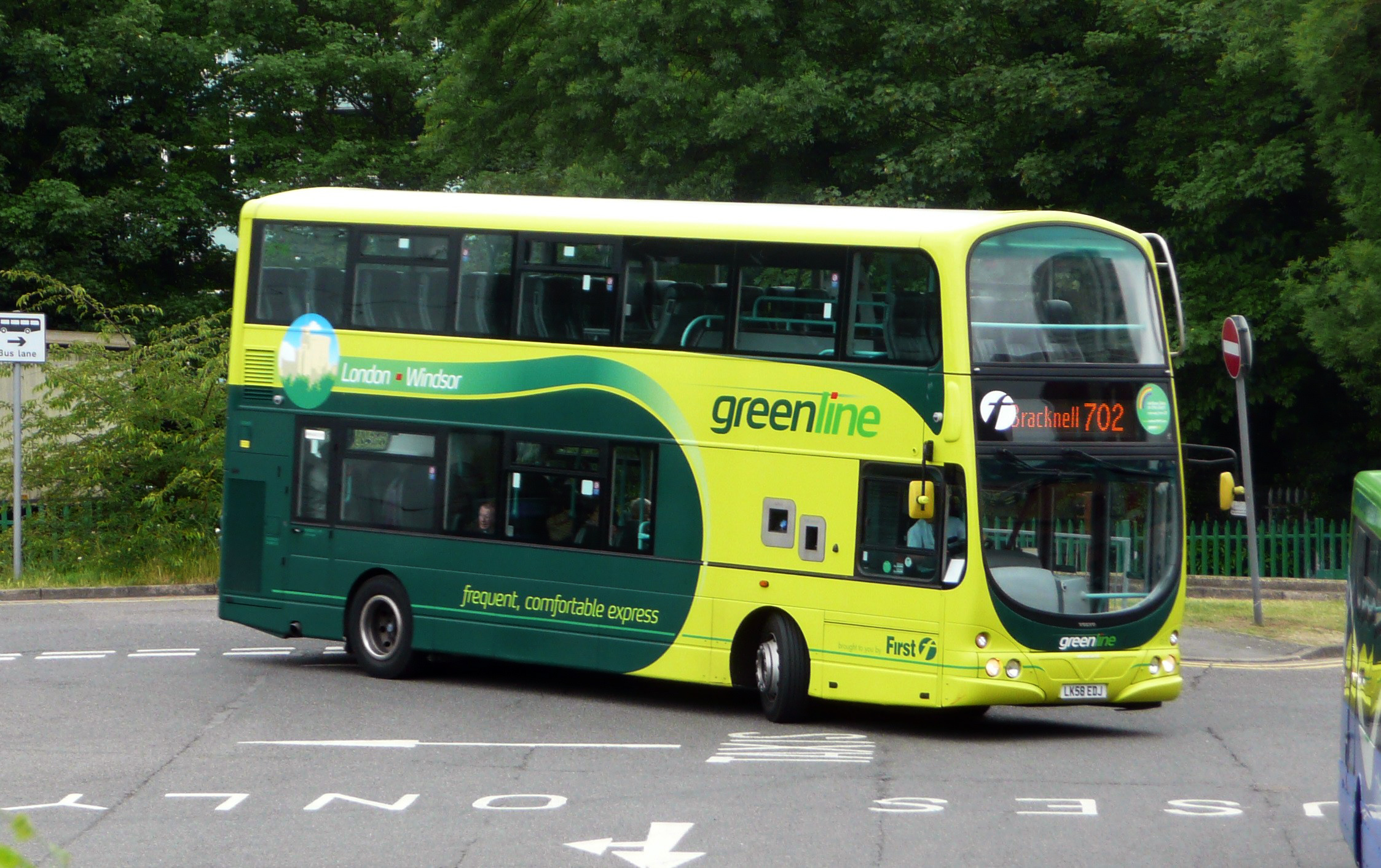
Green Line liveried Wright Eclipse Gemini bodied Volvo B9TL in Bracknell in June 2010

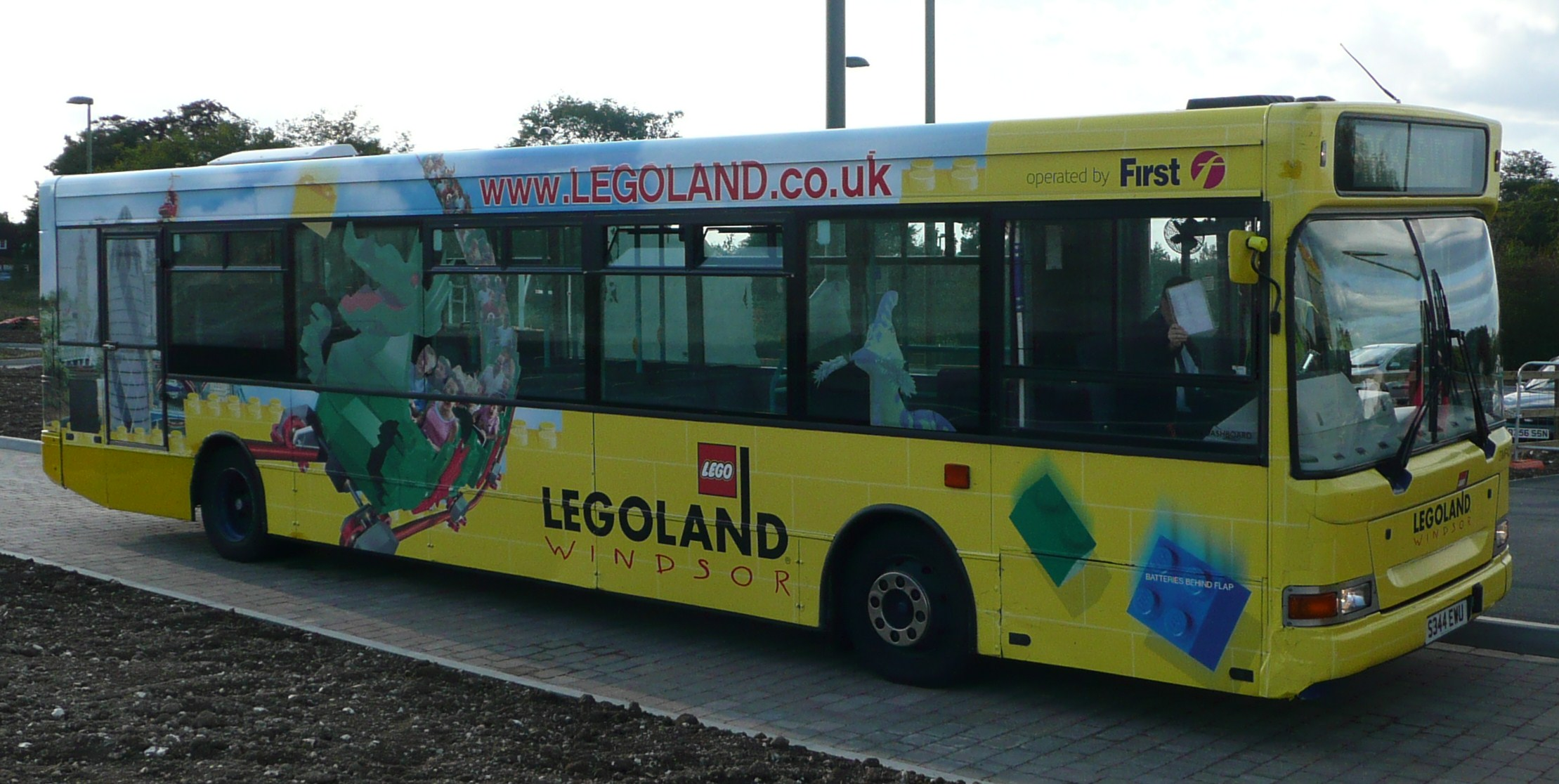
Legoland liveried Plaxton Pointer 2 bodied Dennis Dart SLF in Merrow in October 2008

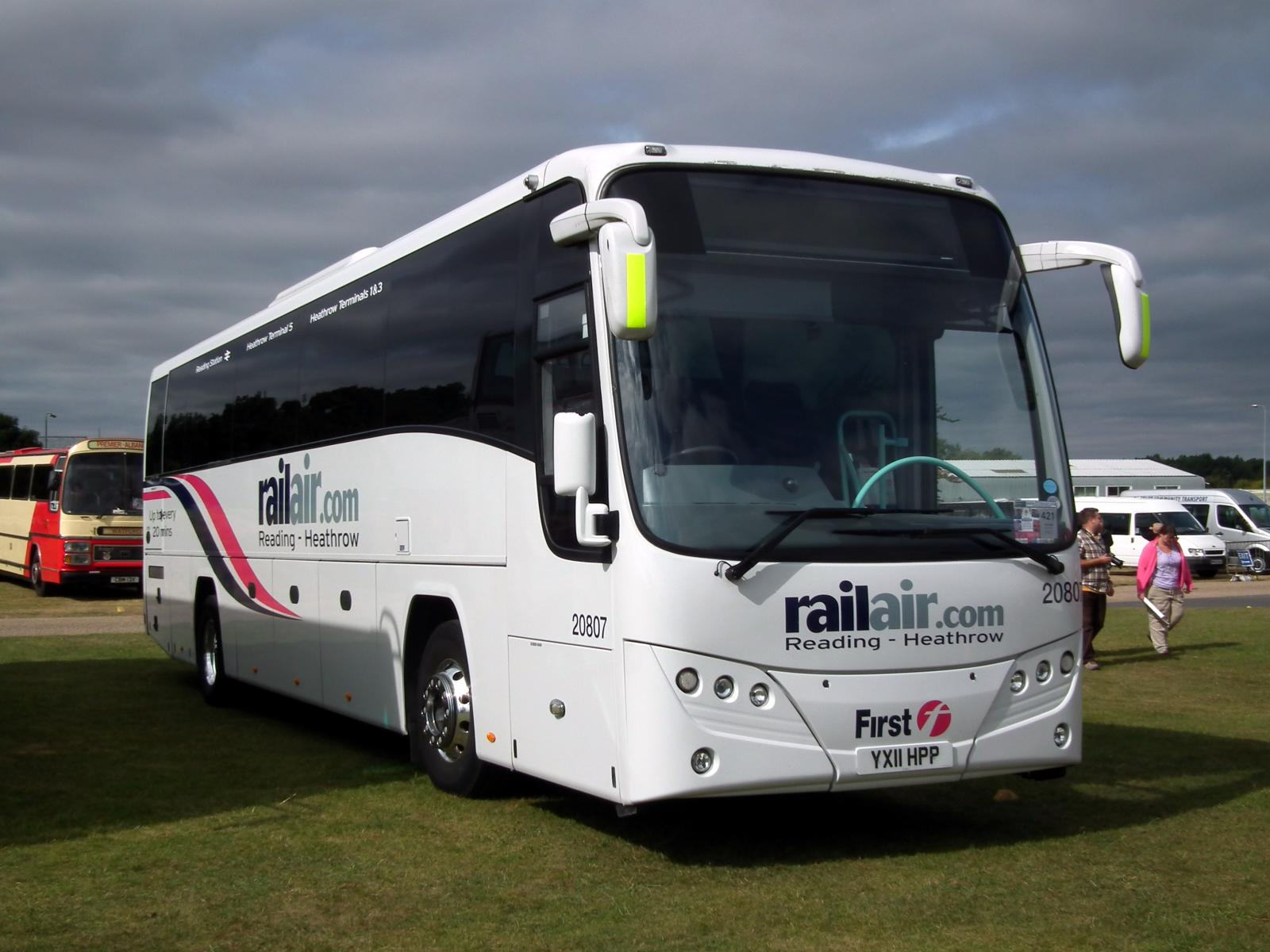
RailAir liveried Plaxton Panther bodied Volvo B9R in September 2012

== See also ==
- List of bus operators of the United Kingdom
