= Heathrow Central bus station =

Bus station in London, England

Coordinates: 51.4715°N 0.4532°W

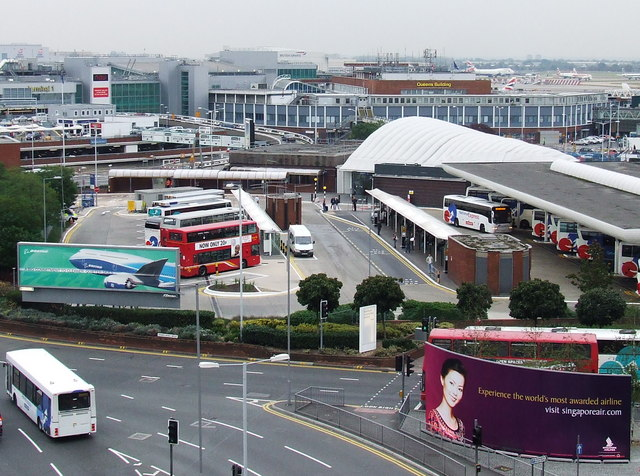
- The bus station in 2007

General information
- Location: Heathrow Airport; London Borough of Hillingdon
- Owner: Heathrow Airport Holdings
- Operator: National Express
- Bus stands: 14
- Bus operators: Arriva; Carlone; Carousel; Diamond South East; First Berkshire & The Thames Valley; Flixbus; London Buses; National Express; Oxford Bus Company
- Connections: Heathrow Terminals 2 & 3 tube station; Heathrow Terminals 2 & 3 railway station
Location

Heathrow Central bus station is a large bus station that serves terminals 2 and 3 of Heathrow Airport, in London, England. It provides urban bus and long-distance coach services to destinations in London and to regional destinations across Britain. It is the UK's busiest bus and coach station with over 1,600 services each day to over 1,000 destinations. An estimated 13% of air passengers using Heathrow Airport use bus and coach services from Heathrow Central bus station.

== Services ==
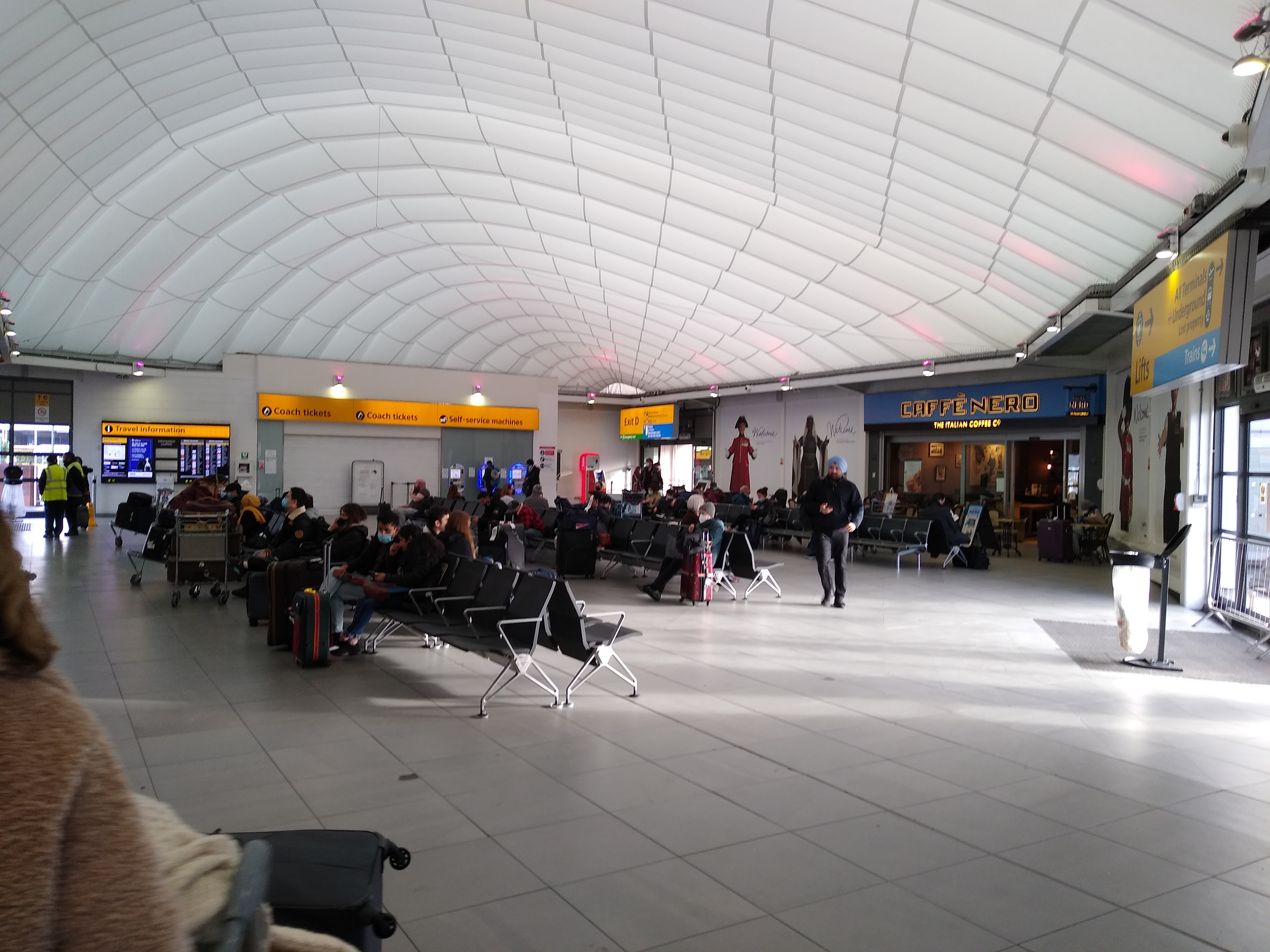
Interior of the station in 2021

Local London Buses operate from stands 18 and 19 as far as Uxbridge, Ruislip, Harrow, Greenford, Hounslow, Kingston and Croydon. A night bus operates into Central London.

First Beeline, Arriva Herts & Essex, Carousel Buses and Diamond South East operate bus services from stand 20 to destinations including Cippenham, Slough, High Wycombe, Whitley Village, Watford, St Albans and Harlow.

Long-distance coach services by First Berkshire & The Thames Valley (RailAir), Flixbus, National Express and The Airline operate from stands 6 to 17 connecting with other airports, main towns and cities across the United Kingdom.

== Transport interchange ==
Heathrow Central bus station is situated directly above Heathrow Terminals 2 & 3 tube station on the Piccadilly line of London Underground linked by escalators and lifts. It is also linked by underground walkways to Heathrow Central railway station, which is served by the Elizabeth line and Heathrow Express. Both these stations provide direct rail links with Central London.

== Access to terminals ==
Heathrow Central bus station is open 24 hours a day and it is connected to Terminals 2 and 3 via underground walkways.

Air passengers travelling through Terminals 4 and 5 can use rail services free of charge within the Heathrow free travel zone (All Heathrow terminals and Hatton Cross) to reach the bus station. A travel centre at the central bus station provides travel information.

Passengers using Central Bus station but not connecting via flights from the airport are directed to use paid parking at Terminal 2. The cost for parking for the first hour as of December 2023 was £9.60. Terminal 2 car park is in excess of 1 km (0.62 mi) walk from the bus terminal and wheel chairs are available for those requiring assistance by calling the help points near the lifts in the car park in terminal 2. The number of wheel chairs is limited and can take up to an hour to arrive.
