= Brookside, Berkshire =

Village in Berkshire, England

Coordinates: 51.425191°N 0.680864°W

Brookside
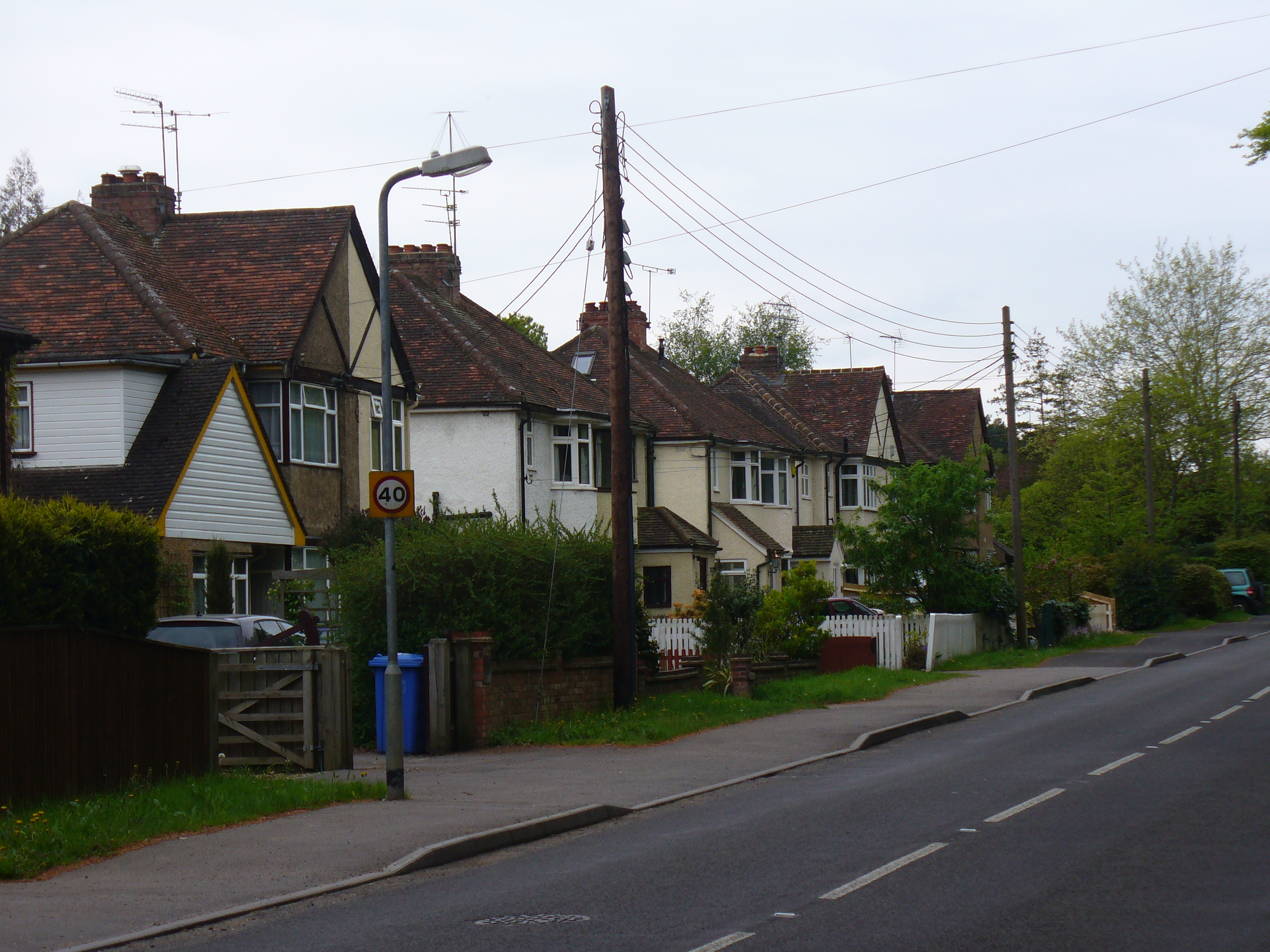
- Forest Road

- Location within Berkshire
- OS grid reference: SU918706
- Metropolitan borough: Bracknell Forest
- Metropolitan county: Berkshire
- Region: South East
- Country: England
- Sovereign state: United Kingdom
- Post town: BRACKNELL
- Postcode district: SL5
- Dialling code: 01344
- Police: Thames Valley
- Fire: Royal Berkshire
- Ambulance: South Central
- UK Parliament: Maidenhead

Brookside is a village in the civil parish of Winkfield in the county of Berkshire, England.

The settlement lies east of the A332 road and is approximately 0.5 miles (0.80 km) north of Ascot Racecourse.
