= Alder Valley =

British bus operating company

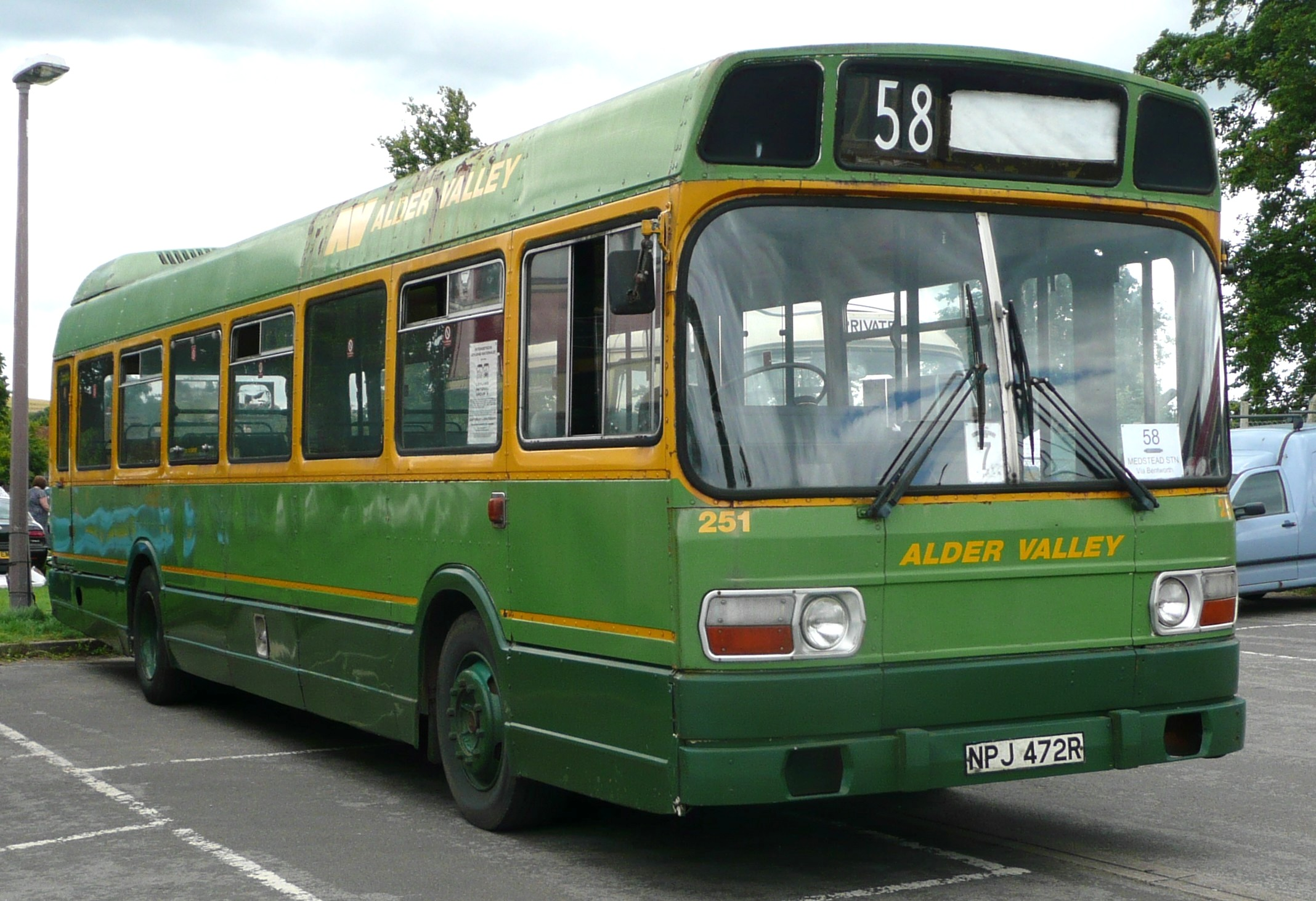
- Leyland National in Alton in 2008
- Parent: National Bus Company
- Founded: 1 January 1972
- Ceased operation: 16 October 1992
- Headquarters: Aldershot
- Service area: Berkshire; Hampshire; Surrey
- Depots: 11

Alder Valley (the fleet name of Thames Valley & Aldershot Omnibus Company Limited) was a bus operator in South East England. Formed in January 1972 by the merger of two older bus companies, it ceased operations when its services were broken up and sold off in October 1992.

== National Bus Company era ==
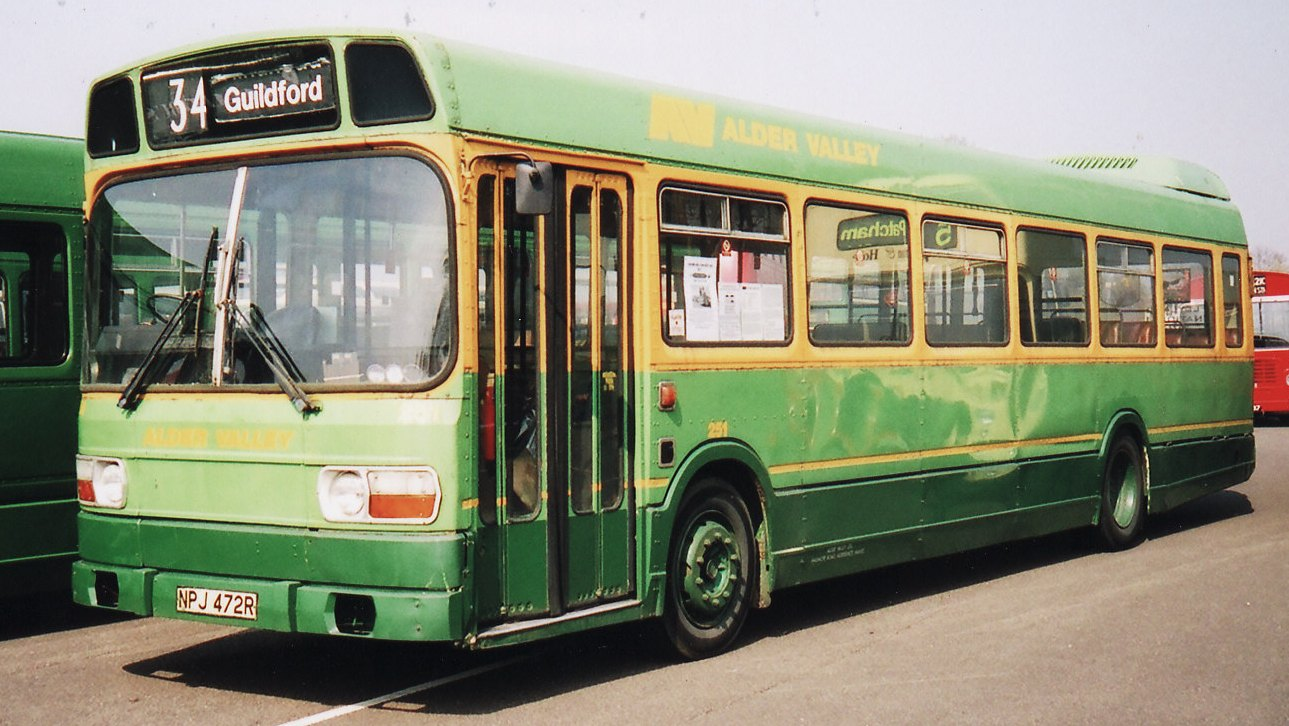
Preserved Leyland National

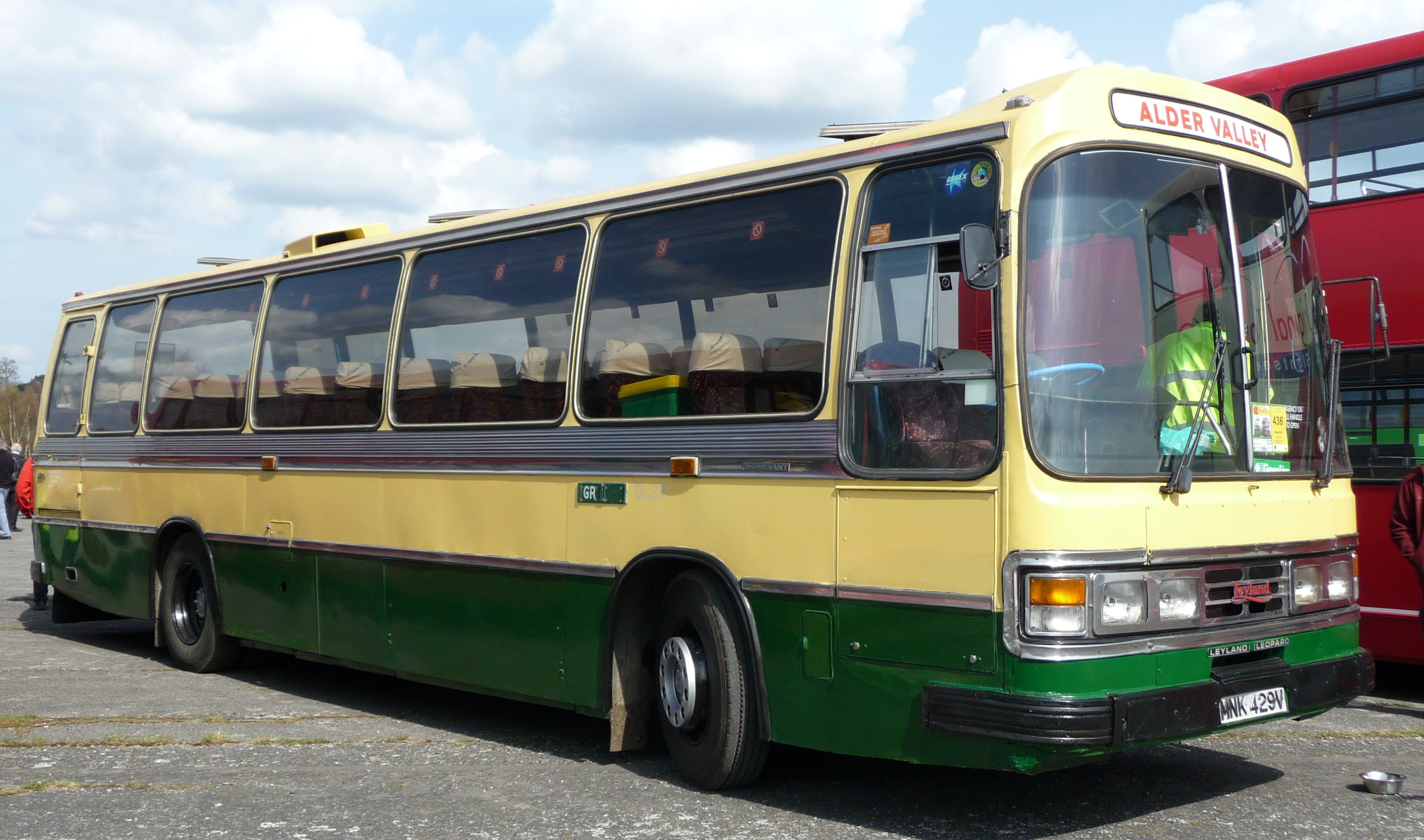
Preserved Duple bodied Leyland Leopard in April 2009

Alder Valley was formed when National Bus Company (NBC) subsidiaries Aldershot & District Traction (A&D) and Thames Valley Traction (TV) merged on 1 January 1972.

The name Alder Valley was an amalgamation of the former names, but not representing any geographical feature or area. Despite the merger, the company initially maintained two divisions: Reading, covering the former TV area, and Aldershot, covering A&D's area, each of which continued to issue its own timetable booklet. From 1 November 1973 these divisions were renamed North and South. Thames Valley had also managed the South Midland express services between Oxford and London, but these were transferred to City of Oxford Motor Services in 1971. The new company's head office was at the former TV headquarters in Reading, but the Aldershot office was retained as a divisional headquarters, and in 1981 became the head office, allowing the Reading site to be sold for redevelopment.

=== Liveries ===
The buses began to be painted in dark red and cream, with small Tilling-style Alder Valley fleetnames with gold coloured lettering in early 1972. In keeping with the NBC policy, however, poppy red was soon applied (from December 1972), with a white stripe at waist level (single-deckers) or above the lower windows (double-deckers), along with white double-N logo, bold white fleetnames and light grey wheels. The logo later appeared in red and blue on a round-cornered white rectangular background.

In the early days of the NBC livery, cream coloured NBC-style fleetnames and logos were applied to those vehicles which retained A&D two-tone green/cream or the early red/cream liveries. Alder Valley coaches were painted white all over with the red and blue "NATIONAL" fleetname and logo, with the Alder Valley fleetname less-prominently. "Dual-purpose" vehicles (i.e. bus-bodied vehicles fitted with coach seats and used mainly on long-distance stage-carriage services but also on express services, private hire, excursions and local stage-carriage services) were painted poppy red below waist level and white above, with red fleetnames and logos.

A variation was a white livery with broad red band at waist level. In 1977 (and for some time afterwards) a Dennis Loline carried a silver and red livery in honour of the Queen's Silver Jubilee. Later, coaches carried a livery of white with an angular application of black and red horizontal stripes; this was also applied to the company's open-top double-decker based at Aldershot depot (see illustration). Coaches used on the London express services carried Londonlink branding from this point. There were, however, a large number of variations from the above standards.

=== Fleet ===
While A&D was a British Electric Traction company with a varied fleet including mostly Dennis Lolines and AEC Reliances, Thames Valley had a typical Tilling Group fleet comprising almost entirely Bristol vehicles. Some cross-border swapping of vehicles occurred between the two divisions after the merger. Through NBC days, Alder Valley adopted the Leyland National and Bristol VRT as its standard single and double deck buses. In the early/mid-1970s there was a severe shortage of vehicles, resulting in the hiring-in of a varied fleet which included a Trans World Airlines double decker noted on services from Aldershot, including the service 12 to Reading in 1974; a number of elderly City of Oxford AEC Reliances in maroon and green livery, which operated Aldershot local services; and at least two ageing Sheffield United Tours coaches which operated daily on the Farnham to London service. Vehicle shortages (together with poor staff morale and retention) led to poor customer service at this time, with many service cancellations.

=== Depots ===
Depots were maintained in Newbury, Reading, Lambourn, High Wycombe, Maidenhead, Bracknell, Aldershot, Guildford, Woking, Hindhead and Alton, which eventually became an outstation when Alton depot was closed.

=== Operation ===
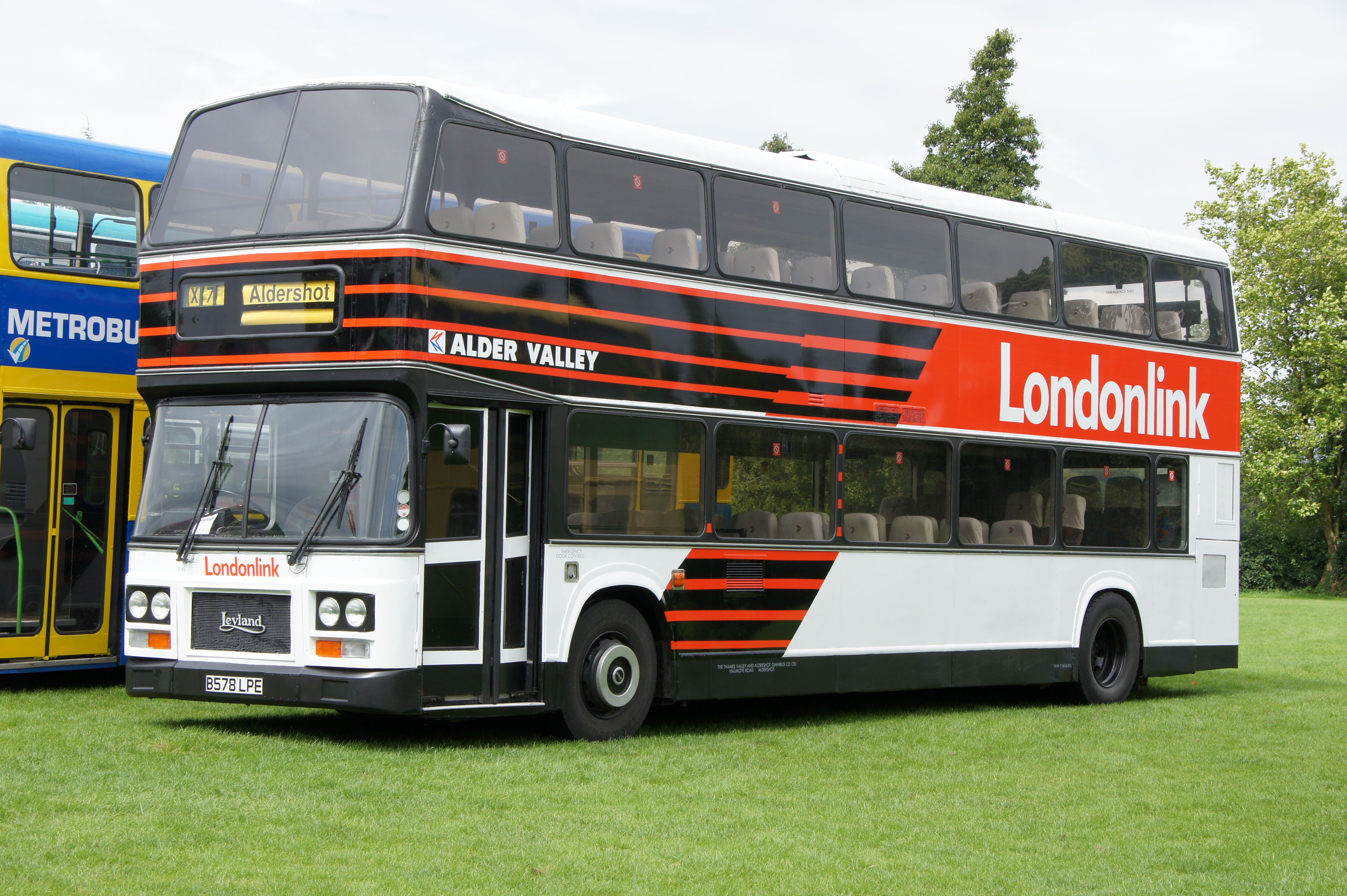
Preserved Eastern Coach Works bodied Leyland Olympian in Londonlink livery in July 2011

As well as local services, Alder Valley also ran frequent express coach services from Farnham and Reading into London, and seasonal services to the south coast. With changes in legislation in the early 1980s, the London services were mostly switched to the M3 and M4 motorways and re-branded as Londonlink. These services enjoyed a healthy boom period for a decade or so, with greatly expanded commuter services. However, towards the end of the decade, partly due to increased motorway traffic slowing journeys down, passenger loadings declined sharply, thus the Farnham branch was withdrawn, and the Reading service was passed to the North division.

=== Decline ===
At the same time, local services were in decline and the Market Analysis Project (MAP) resulted in severe reductions in mileage, the end of any remaining two-person bus operation, and a reduction in the fleet size. Local fleetnames were applied to buses and publicity, and the Blackwater Valley MAP scheme saw the revival of the Aldershot & District name, while other areas were less fortunate (Forestride, Weyfarer, etc.). These names vanished after a couple of years.

In the lead up to deregulation, Alder Valley was again split on 1 January 1986 into Alder Valley North and Alder Valley South. Initially, North and South were added to the company names. The NBC red livery was maintained initially, although it wasn't long before Alder Valley North experimented with various combinations of red, yellow and grey.

== Deregulation and privatisation ==
=== Alder Valley North ===
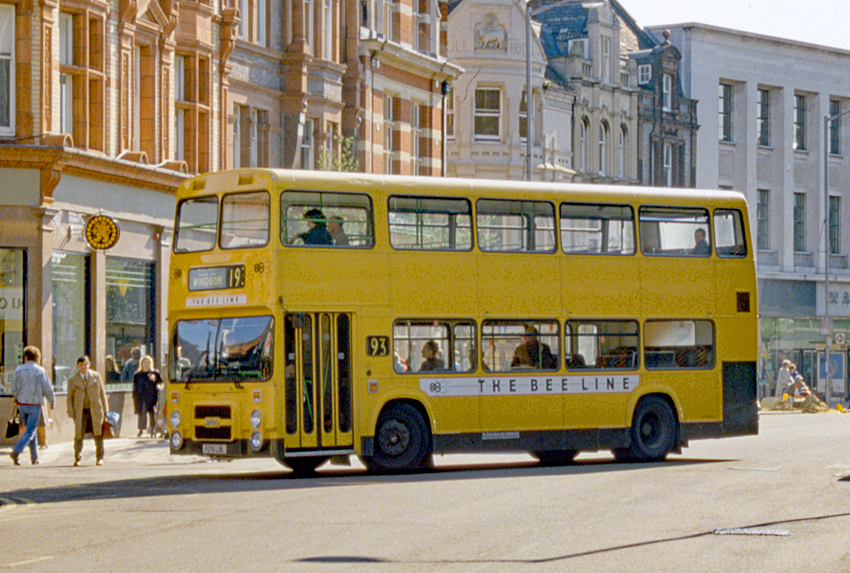
The Bee Line Leyland Olympian in Friar Street, Reading (1989)

In the lead-up to deregulation in 1986, Alder Valley North was rebranded as The Bee Line with a yellow and grey livery adorned with bees. It was sold to Q Drive in December 1987. The company was shrinking. It retreated first from High Wycombe, where the operations were sold in October 1990 to the Oxford Bus Company who ran them as Wycombe Bus, selling them in 2000 to Arriva Shires & Essex. In 1992 The Bee Line sold its Reading and Newbury operations to Reading Transport. In 1993 the company expanded when the former London Country North West depot at Slough was purchased from Luton & District, although this led to the closure of Maidenhead depot. In March 1996, the remaining operations were sold to CentreWest, which was then sold to FirstBus and rebranded as First Berkshire.

=== Alder Valley South ===
Alder Valley South, meanwhile, was sold in December 1987 to the Frontsource Group. It dropped the South from its name and adopted a two-tone green and yellow livery. It was sold in December 1988 to Q Drive, bringing both parts of Alder Valley back under common ownership. Q Drive sold the Guildford and Woking operations in November 1990 to the Drawlane Group which eventually became part of Arriva Guildford & West Surrey. On 26 October 1992, the rest of the company was sold to Stagecoach as Stagecoach in Hants & Surrey. The once impressive Londonlink network also went into terminal decline. The remnant of the network are today's Green Line services 701 and 702 from Bracknell to London operated by Reading Buses.

== Alder Valley Travel ==
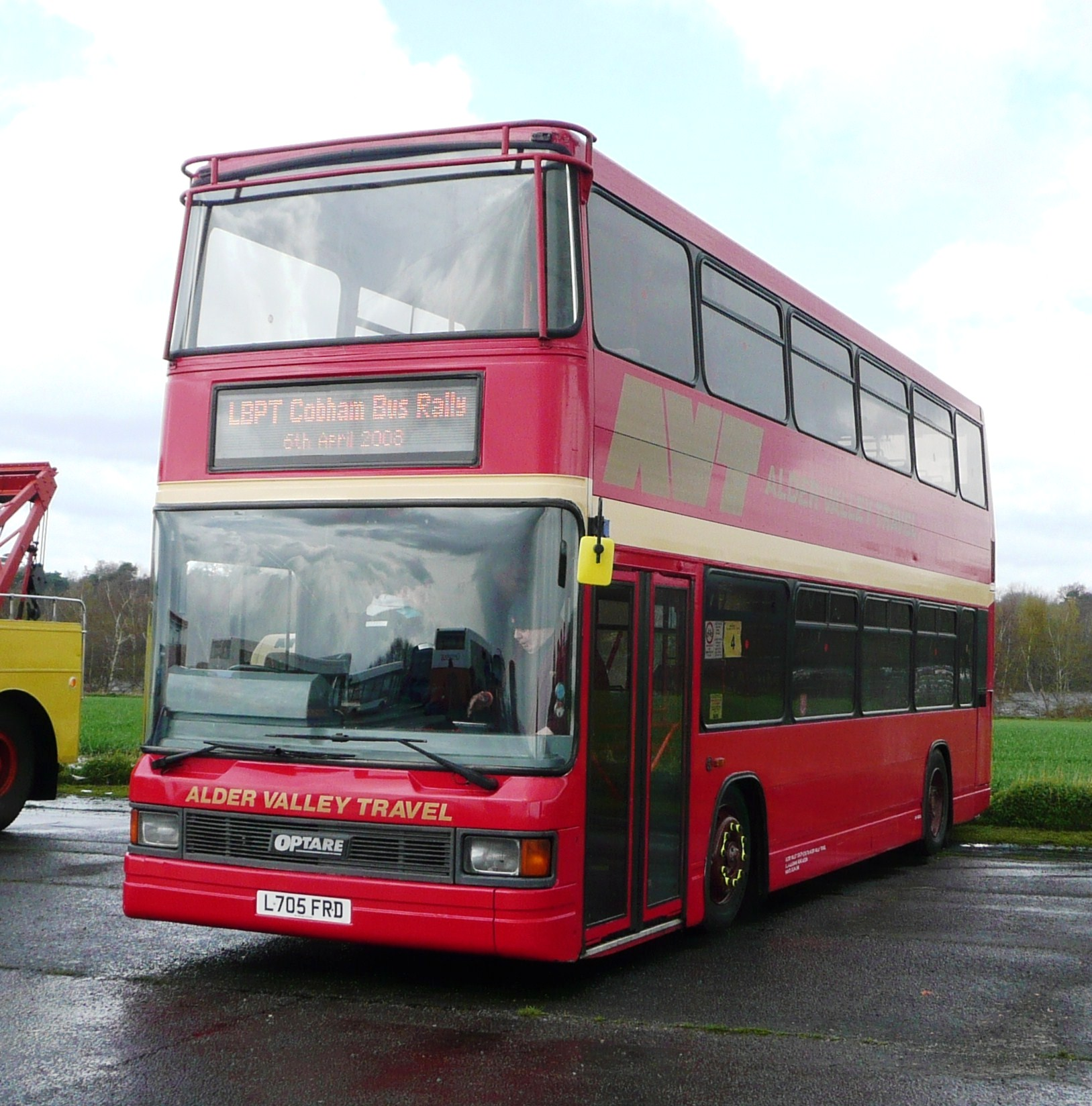
Alder Valley Travel Optare Spectra in Cobham in 2008

In 2002, the name was revived when Alder Valley Travel commenced trading. It operated a fleet of vehicles on private hire work, school contracts, stage carriage bus services and rail replacement services, and was based in Alton, with a second depot in Staines. As at February 2008, the company operated four routes on behalf of Surrey County Council:

- 84: Bisley to Camberley (Collingwood College)
- 85: Ash to Collingwood College
- 690: Winston Churchill School to Brookwood and Worplesdon
- 828: Knaphill to Guildford

The company ceased trading on 22 May 2009, its vehicles and routes passing to Atbus.
