= Thames Valley Traction =

British bus operating company

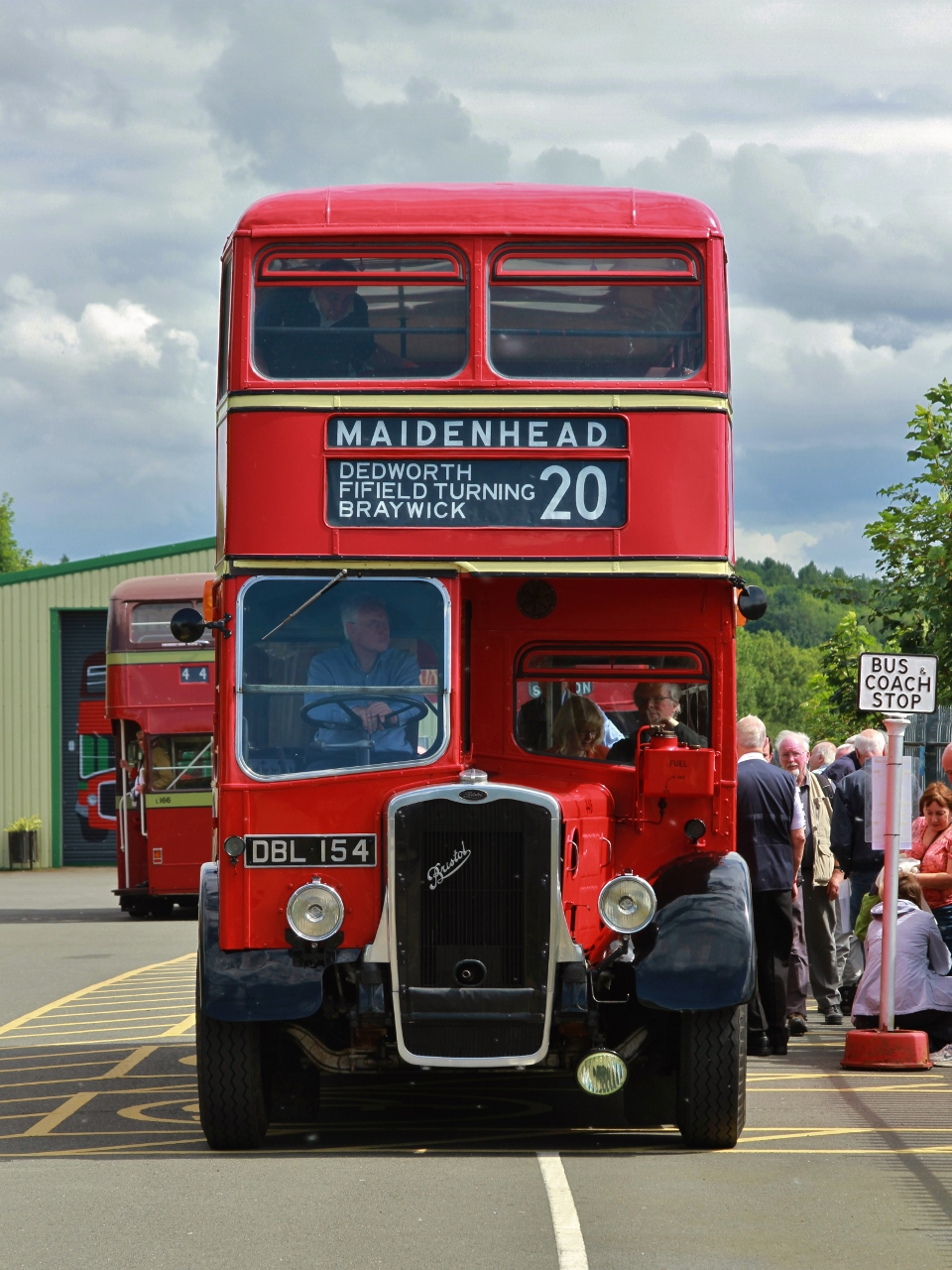
- A preserved Thames Valley 1946 Bristol K bus at a bus rally at Oxford Bus Museum
- Parent: BET (86%); Thomas Tilling (14%)
- Founded: 10 July 1920
- Ceased operation: 1 January 1972
- Service area: Berkshire; Buckinghamshire; Oxfordshire
- Depots: Reading, Maidenhead

Thames Valley Traction Company Limited was a major bus company operating services to and from Reading, Bracknell, Maidenhead, Newbury, High Wycombe and Oxford and surrounding areas for 52 years in the 20th century. For many years it ran the "Reading A" and "Reading B" limited-stop services between London's Victoria Coach Station and Reading via two differing sets of intermediate stops.

== British Automotive Traction ==
In 1905 British Electric Traction (BET) founded a subsidiary, British Automotive Developments (BAD), to develop and operate motor buses. In 1912 BAD was renamed British Automobile Traction (BAT). In March 1915 BAT established a Reading Branch to operate buses in the area. By January 1920 it had been renamed the Thames Valley Branch, and in July 1920 it was constituted as a subsidiary company, Thames Valley Traction, with BAT holding 86% of the shares. The remaining 14% was initially held by Britain's other large bus operating group, Thomas Tilling, as in the 1920s there was close co-operation between the two groups.

In 1928 BAT was reconstituted as Tilling & British Automobile Traction Ltd. Thames Valley expanded significantly in the 1920s and 1930s by buying a number of smaller firms and their routes. Tillings sold out to the British Transport Commission in 1948, thus becoming a nationalised company. Thames Valley's expansion continued in the early 1950s, with other parts of the newly nationalised bus network (South Midland and Newbury and District from Red & White, and part of United Counties) being placed under Thames Valley management.

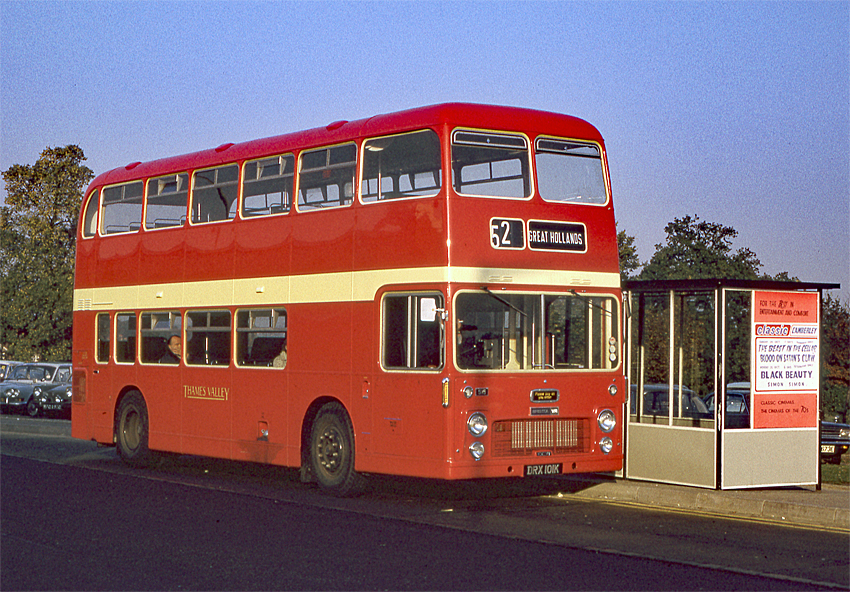
Thames Valley 515 Bristol VR ECW in Bracknell

In 1968 Tillings' major competitor, BET, sold its bus interests to the Transport Holding Company (successor to the BTC) and the Transport Act 1968 formed the National Bus Company, which came into existence on 1 January 1969, amalgamating the interests of The Tilling Group with the recently acquired BET Group.

== Premises ==
BAT Reading Branch's first premises were at 113–117 Caversham Road, Reading, which had been the premises of a local taxi operator. BAT used 115 and 117 as offices and demolished 113 to create bus access to the yard and garage at the rear.

In January 1916 the Reading Branch acquired a second set of premises when BAT bought a large house called The Cedars at 44 Bridge Street, Maidenhead. BAT had most of the house demolished, except for the east wing which was converted into offices. A bus garage was built in the house's grounds.

== Vehicles ==
In 1915 BAT intended that its Reading branch should have a fleet of 20 new buses built on Thornycroft 40 HP J-type chassis. But during the First World War the War Department had commandeered all Thornycroft chassis production to make three-ton military trucks. Therefore the Reading Branch's fleet started with nearly-new Leyland S8 buses transferred from BAT's Barnsley and District subsidiary. Each had a 27-seat body built by Brush in Rugby. The S8's had been built in 1913 and reached Reading in June and July 1915. Their bodies were painted in BAT livery of "Saxon" green with the name "BRITISH" in large gold letters on each side.

Between September 1915 and July 1916 BAT expanded its Reading branch fleet with a dozen 26-seat buses on new Belsize three-ton chassis. Although the chassis were new the first eight were equipped with second-hand Tilling bodies. The final four Belsizes were fitted with Brush bodies. The arrival of the new Belsizes allowed the Reading Branch firstly to expand its route network and then to dispose of the Leylands, all of which returned to Barnsley and District between April and November 1916.

The Belsize buses were not entirely reliable. But after the Armistice of 11 November 1918 the War Department stopped buying new lorries for the armed forces, which allowed Thornycroft at last to meet BAT's order for J-type chassis for the Reading Branch. The original order of 20 was delivered new between January and May 1919, mostly with 26-seat bodies. The first batch of eight received Tilling bodies, followed by four with Brush bodies. Next came a batch of six with bodies built by Birch Brothers of Kentish Town, London. Two Thornycroft chassis delivered in May 1919 were equipped with second-hand charabanc bodies, one built by Bayley of Newington Causeway in London and the other built by Thomas Harrington Ltd of Hove, East Sussex. The two charabancs arrived just in time to offer excursions for the 1919 season. The delivery of Thornycroft J-types allowed the Reading Branch to dispose of all of its Belsize buses in January and February 1919.

After the first order of 20 J-type chassis were delivered, BAT bought a further three new chassis from Thornycroft for the Reading Branch. These had military-specification bonnets and may have come from a cancelled WD order. The first two arrived with "lorrybus" bodies — truck bodies adapted with steps at the rear, bench seats and a canvas hood. This austerity specification allowed the pair to be completed quickly and enter service in July and August 1919.

By January 1920 BAT's Reading Branch had been renamed the Thames Valley Branch. The third chassis was delivered that month with a Tilling body. In the same month the Thames Valley Branch received a pair of second-hand Tilling J-types from the East Kent Road Car Company. They had been built in 1919 for an independent Kent bus operator and fitted with second-hand London General Omnibus Company 34-seat double-deck bodies dating from 1913. East Kent had taken over the independent operator in September 1919 and disposed of the two Thornycrofts as non-standard to its fleet.

After the Armistice the WD started to sell large numbers of used military vehicles. Many were stored at a depot in Slough, where in April 1920 BAT bought eight Thornycroft J-types for the Thames Valley Branch. BAT bought many other ex-military vehicles for its other branches, and the Thames Valley Branch collected many of them from Slough to distribute to BAT's other operations. They included AEC and Daimler vehicles for BAT's Macclesfield Branch and Northern General subsidiary.

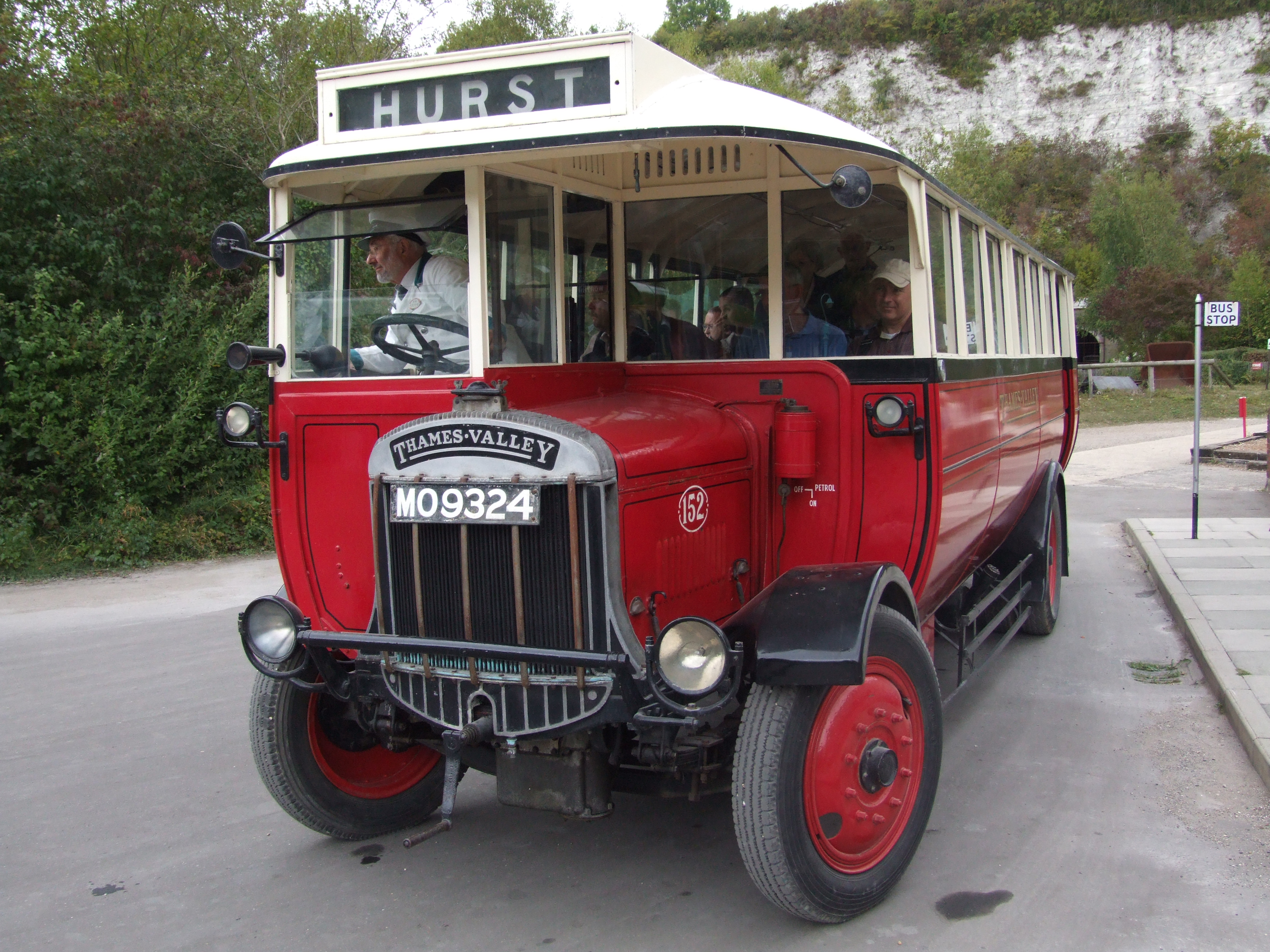
A preserved Thames Valley 1927 Tilling-Stevens B9A bus at Amberley Museum & Heritage Centre

When the Thames Valley Branch became Thames Valley Traction its fleet consisted of 33 Thornycroft J-types: 30 bodied as buses, two as charabancs and one as a lorry. For ancillary purposes it had also a Ford Model T van, a Bedford car and a BSA motorcycle and sidecar outfit.

In the 1920s Thames Valley's fleet policy changed, and by 1927 it was buying Tilling-Stevens petrol-electric buses. In 1939 its first Bristol vehicles were delivered and, in the Second World War, a number of Guy utility buses were acquired. After the war Thames Valley standardised on Bristols, except for a few Bedford vehicles. Livery was red and cream, although the shade of red varied over time.

== Alder Valley ==
The company continued to trade as Thames Valley under nationalised ownership until it was merged with another former BET company, Aldershot and District Traction Company Limited, on 1 January 1972 to form the Thames Valley and Aldershot Omnibus Company which traded under the fleet name of Alder Valley, with Thames Valley's Reading head office becoming that of the new company.

== Sources and further reading ==
- Lacey, Paul (1990). Thames Valley the British Years: 1915–1920. Wokingham: Paul Lacey. ISBN 0-9510739-3-1.
- Lacey, Paul (1995). A History of the Thames Valley Traction Company Limited 1920 to 1930. Wokingham: Paul Lacey. ISBN 0-9510739-5-8.
