= London Buses route 142 =

London bus route

142
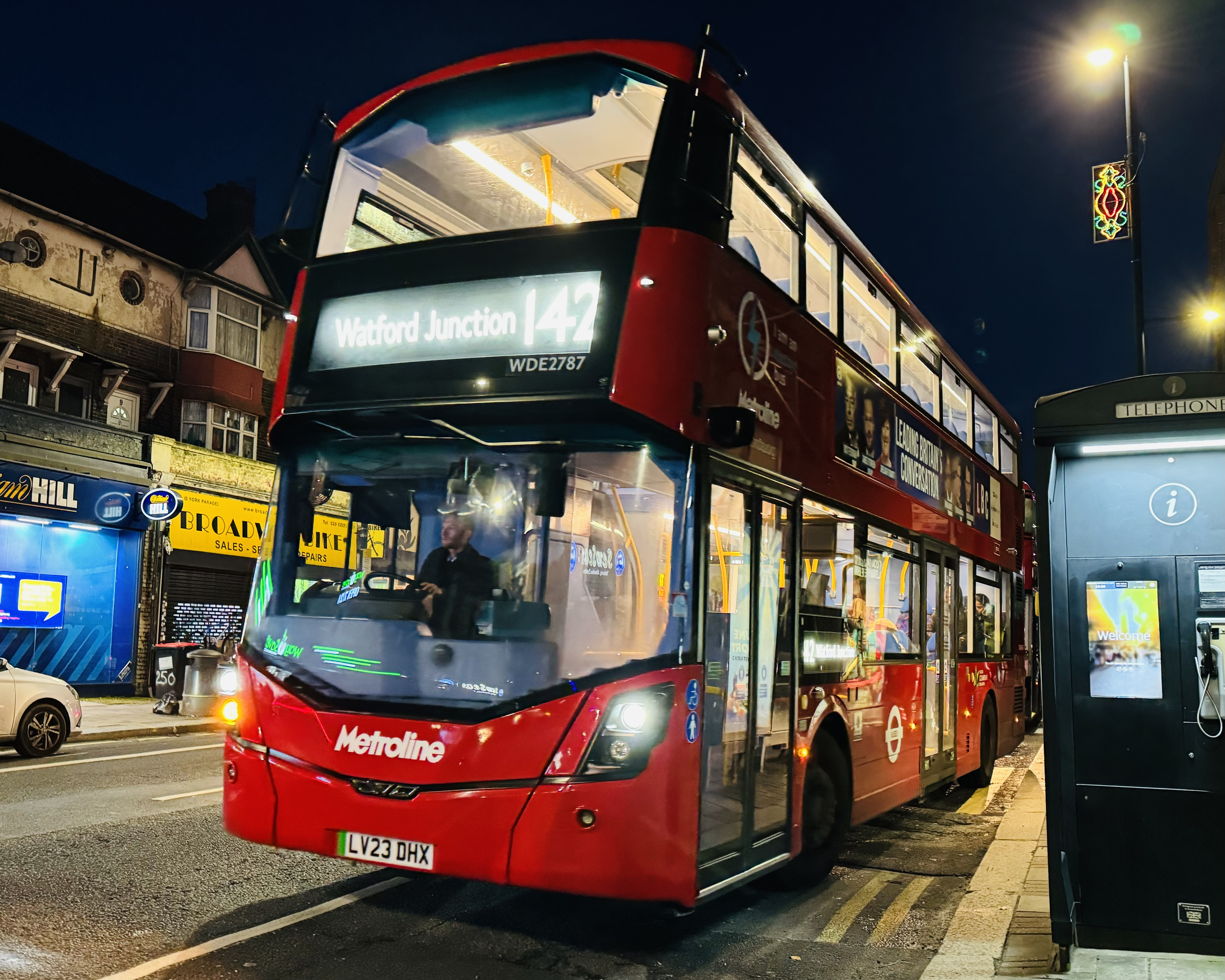
- Metroline Wright StreetDeck Electroliner in West Hendon in November 2023

Overview
- Operator: Metroline
- Garage: Edgware
- Vehicle: BYD Alexander Dennis Enviro400EV; Wright StreetDeck Electroliner

Route
- Start: Brent Cross bus station
- Via: West Hendon; Colindale; Edgware; Stanmore; Bushey
- End: Watford Junction station

London Buses route 142 is a Transport for London contracted bus route in London and Hertfordshire, England. Running between Brent Cross bus station and Watford Junction station, it is operated by Metroline.

== History ==
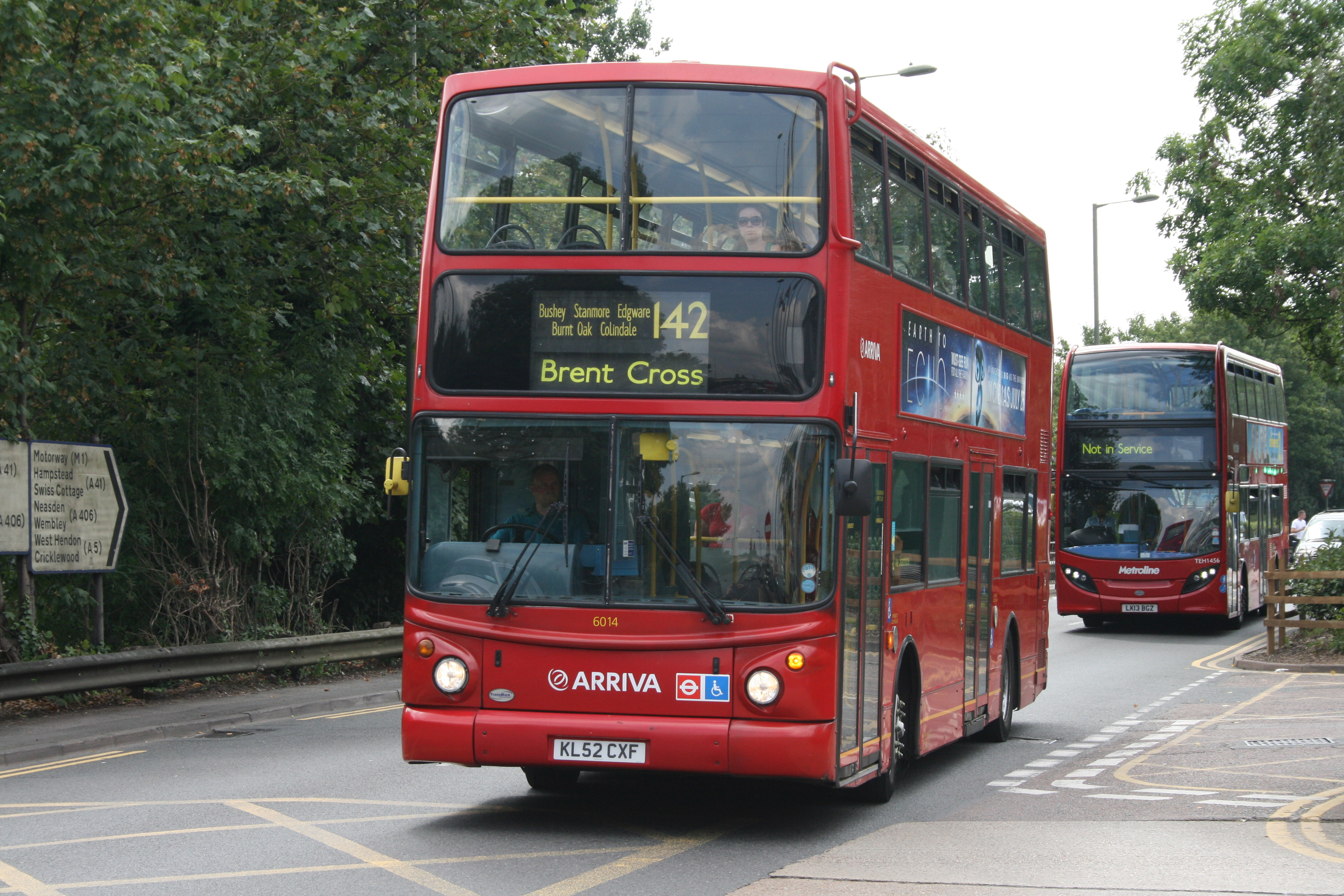
Arriva The Shires TransBus ALX400 bodied VDL DB250 in Brent Cross in August 2014

Route 142 was introduced by the London General Omnibus Company in March 1914.

The allocation was transferred to London Country Bus Services' Watford garage, and became part of London Country North West in 1986. It was included in the sale of the business to Luton & District in October 1990 and retained the contract shortly afterwards, ordering 15 new Leyland Olympians to operate the route. The route was retained again in 1995, making it the first route to be retained by its existing operator through two consecutive retenders.

When re-tendered, it was retained by Arriva The Shires with new contracts commencing on 5 January 2008 and 5 January 2013.

On 6 January 2018, the route passed to London Sovereign from their Edgware (BT) garage with existing Alexander Dennis Enviro400s.

On 7 January 2023, the route passed to Metroline from their Edgware (EW) garage temporarily using existing Alexander Dennis Enviro400s, with brand new Alexander Dennis Enviro400EVs introduced in April 2023 and Wright StreetDeck Electroliner BEVs introduced in June 2023.

== Current route ==
Route 142 operates via these primary locations:

- Brent Cross bus station
- West Hendon Broadway
- Colindale
- Burnt Oak Broadway
- Edgware bus station
- Stanmore station
- Bushey Heath
- Bushey station
- Watford High Street station
- Watford Junction station
