= London Country North East =

Former bus operator in South East England and London

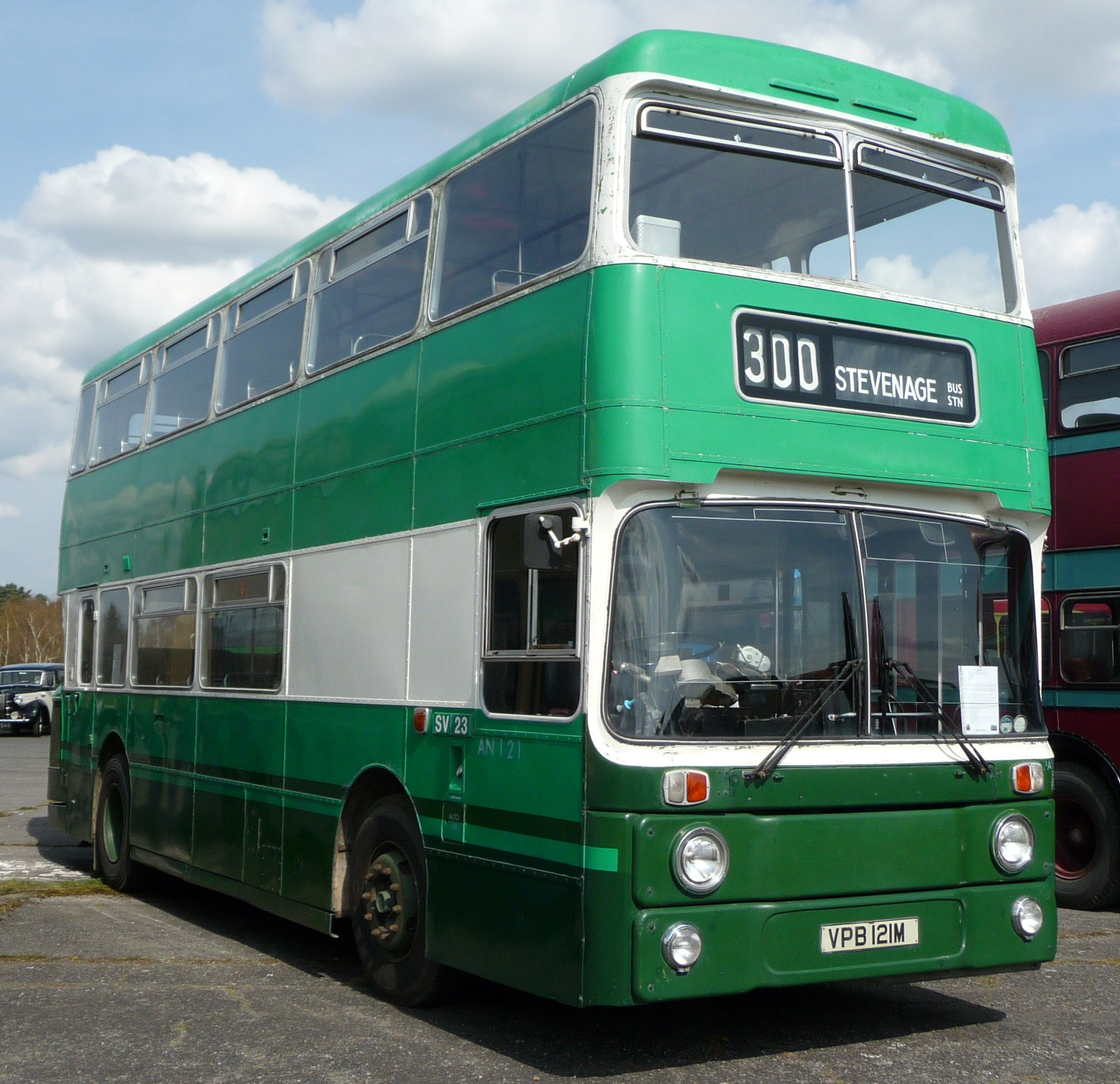
- Preserved Park Royal bodied Leyland Atlantean in London Country North East livery
- Parent: National Bus Company (1986–88); AJS Group 1989
- Founded: 7 September 1986
- Ceased operation: 1989
- Headquarters: Hatfield
- Service area: Hertfordshire; Essex; Greater London
- Service type: Bus operator
- Depots: 6
- Fleet: 350
- Operator: County Bus & Coach; Sovereign Bus & Coach

London Country North East was a bus operator in South East England and London. It was formed from the split of London Country Bus Services in 1986 and operated a fleet of around 350 buses from six garages, with its headquarters located in Hatfield.

The company was the last subsidiary of National Bus Company to be privatised, being sold to the AJS Group on 22 April 1988. Later in the same year it was split into County Bus & Coach and Sovereign Bus & Coach.

== Formation and early history ==
In the run-up to deregulation, London Country Bus Services (LCBS) was broken into four smaller companies on 7 September 1986. Three hundred and fifty buses, the garages at Hatfield, Hertford, Stevenage, Harlow, St Albans and the isolated base at Grays formed the new London Country North East (LCNE) company.

Early difficulties with staff conditions and wages, which the company was attempting to simplify from the complex contracts arranged by LCBS, led to strike action by staff in February 1988. Performance levels on contracted routes were already below those expected by the local councils who had awarded LCNE the contracts, and by London Regional Transport. Following the strike three of the company's London contracts (routes 292, 298 and 313) were terminated and awarded to independents.

On 22 April 1988, London Country North East was sold by the National Bus Company, the last of 72 subsidiaries to be privatised. The buyer was Alan Stephenson's AJS Group, which had been formed by the management buyout of West Yorkshire Road Car Company. As part of the sale LCNE's property was bought by Parkdale Holdings and leased back to the company; some was sold for redevelopment, while the remainder was later sold back to LCNE. Parkdale Holdings later went out of business having changed their name to Pavilion Leisure.

A month later LCNE was banned from registering new services for six months by the Traffic Commissioner for failing to operate service in accordance with registrations made. Following poor financial results, AJS decided to split the company in two.

== Division ==
In 20 months of existence London Country North East had lost £5.5 million, on a turnover of £14 million. Two operating subsidiaries were created to help improve the situation, under the control of a single holding company, initially called the London Country Travel Group and later renamed to South of England Travel Group. Its chief executive, Bob Howells, had previously been West Yorkshire Road Car Company's traffic manager. A third company, Cambridge based Premier Travel Services, was added to the group in 1989 but was sold to Cambus in 1991. Both subsidiaries continued to be owned by AJS until 1991, when they were sold to new owners.

== County Bus & Coach ==
County Bus & Coach
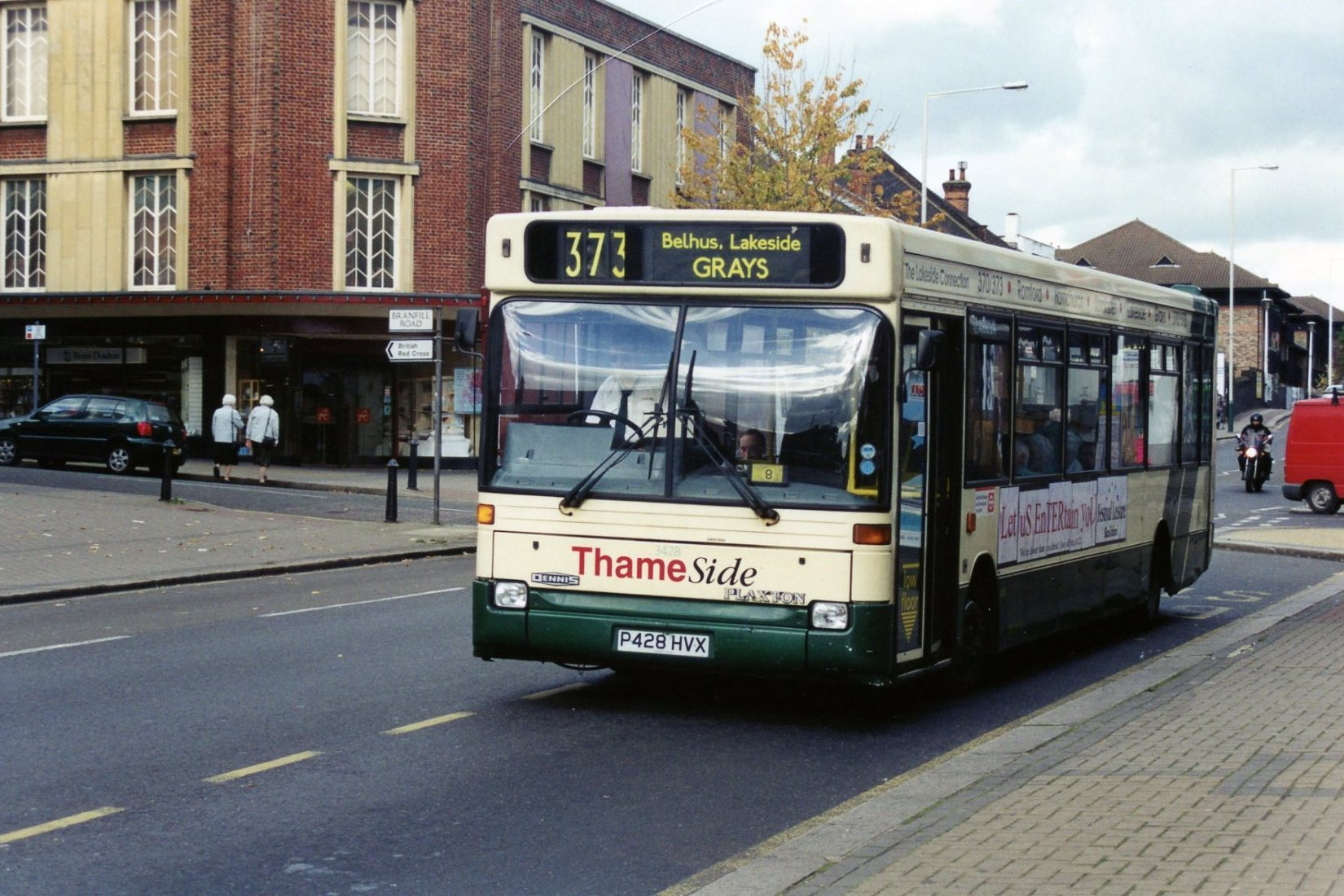
- ThameSide liveried Plaxton Pointer bodied Dennis Dart SLF of County Bus & Coach's successor Arriva Shires & Essex in Upminster in October 2000
- Parent: AJS Group (1989–91); Lynton Travel Group (1991–97)
- Founded: 1989
- Ceased operation: 1997
- Headquarters: Harlow
- Service area: Essex; Greater London; Hertfordshire
- Service type: Bus operator

County Bus & Coach took over the former London Country North East garages at Harlow, Grays and Hertford. Under AJS's ownership it was managed by Graham Willet, previously London Country Bus Services' chief engineer. The company enjoyed some expansion: small independent Sampson Coaches and its garage at Hoddesdon were bought in February 1989; however, as a result of this, Hertford garage was vacated and sold for redevelopment by its owners Parkdale Holdings. The Debden and Wyatts Green depots and some local routes of the former East Midland owned Frontrunner operation were acquired in July 1989. County Bus & Coach's fleet policy was to use Mercedes-Benz minibuses on most routes, including in Grays when Lakeside Shopping Centre opened and when two London contracted routes were run; there is some evidence that passengers did not like these vehicles, and their use is thought to have reduced patronage in the area.

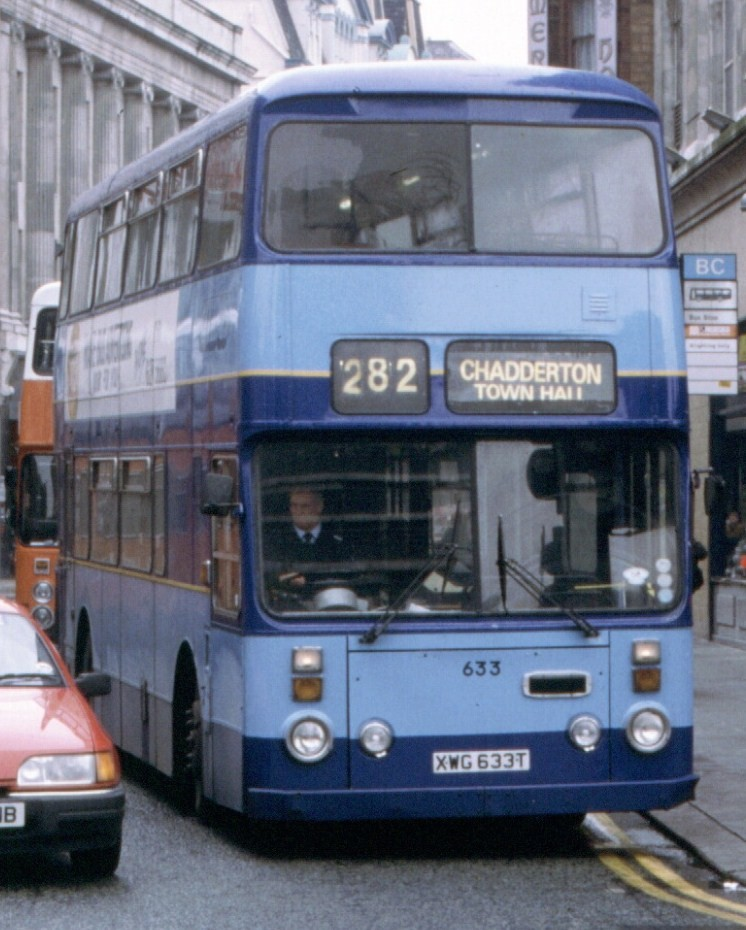
Citibus Tours Leyland Atlantean in Manchester in the 1990s

AJS group was wound up in 1991, and the company's director Bob Howells bought County Bus & Coach through a new holding company, Lynton Travel Group. County Bus & Coach was relaunched with three new local identities: Grays garage became ThameSide, Harlow became TownLink, and Hoddesdon became Lea Valley. One small operator, Davian Coaches of Upper Edmonton, was acquired a few months after and merged with County Bus & Coach.

The company was one of the beneficiaries of the collapse of London Forest, gaining three routes in Walthamstow. The services of Golden Boy were also taken over, in September 1992, although this deal involved no vehicles and no garage. In July 1993, Lynton Travel purchased 41-vehicle Greater Manchester independent operator Citibus Tours, based in Chadderton near Oldham. Other changes made in 1993 included the opening of a new garage in Grays to replace the previous building, and a totally new garage at Ware which replaced that at Hoddesdon. Two more operators were taken over in 1994, namely coach operators Airport Coaches of Stansted Airport and Biss Bros of Bishops Stortford.

However, on 7 October 1994 County Bus & Coach was sold to West Midlands Travel, who had also acquired the former London Buses subsidiary Westlink. In November 1994 County Bus & Coach became only the tenth operator in the UK to introduce low-floor vehicles into service, when four Dennis Lance SLFs with Wright Pathfinder bodywork were purchased with funding from Essex County Council for use on route 502, serving Harlow and Romford. West Midlands Travel was taken over by National Express in 1995, and the new owners decided not to keep their London companies. Westlink was the first to be sold, to London United in September 1995. One year later, County Bus & Coach was sold to the rapidly expanding Cowie Group.

After also taking over British Bus on 1 August 1996, who owned most of the other former London Country Bus Services company; in November 1997 the Cowie Group was rebranded as Arriva.

County Bus & Coach's garage at Grays was transferred to Arriva Southend in 2000, with that company becoming part of the Arriva Southern Counties operation in 2002. The rest of County Bus & Coach's routes, garages and vehicles became Arriva East Herts & Essex. This was later combined with the former Luton & District and London Country North West operations to form Arriva Shires & Essex, in which form County Bus & Coach continues to trade.

== Sovereign Bus & Coach ==
Sovereign Bus & Coach
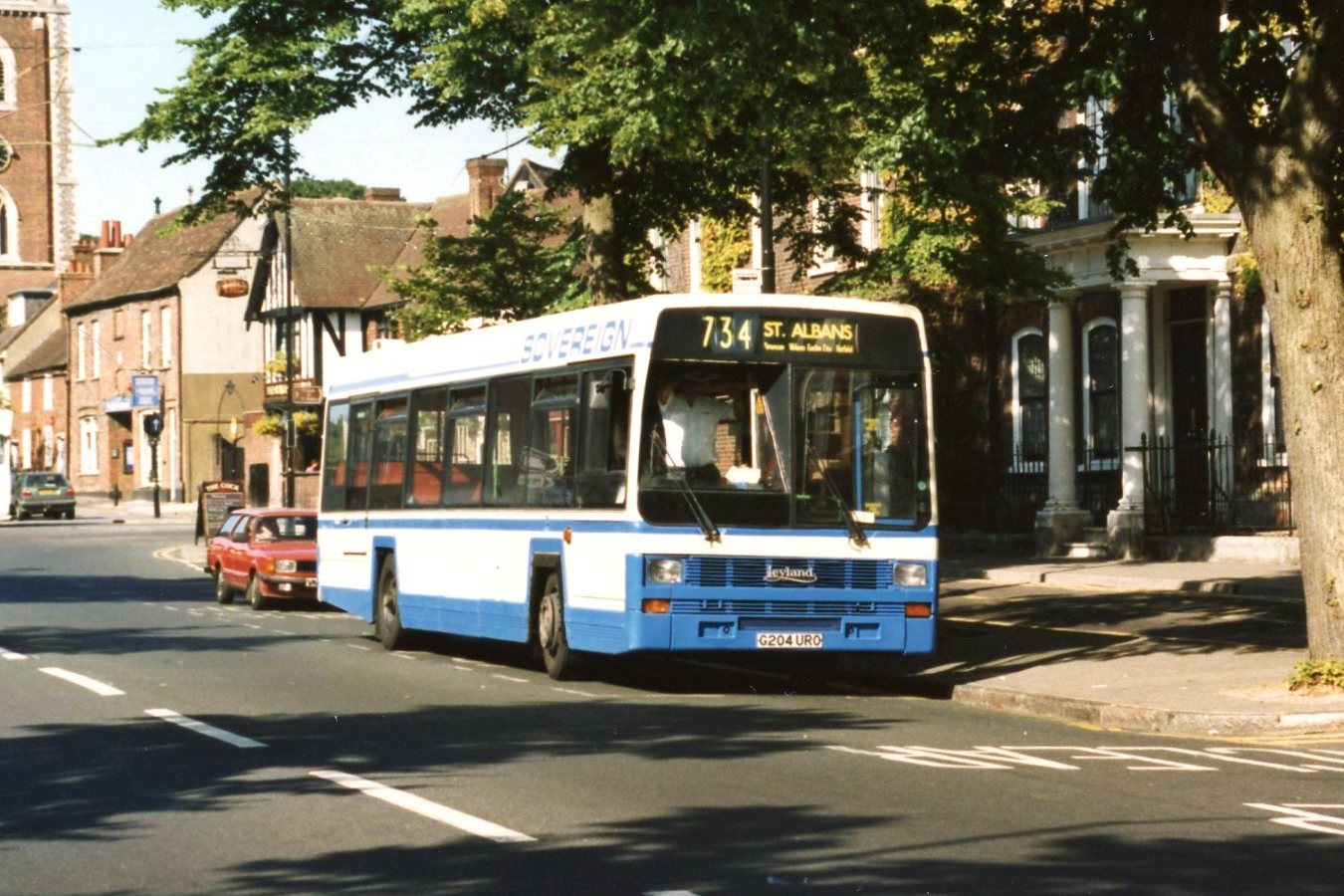
- Sovereign Bus & Coach Leyland Lynx in St Albans in June 1995
- Parent: AJS Group (1989–91); Blazefield Group (1991–2005)
- Founded: 1989
- Ceased operation: 2005
- Headquarters: Hatfield
- Service area: Hertfordshire; Greater London
- Service type: Bus operator

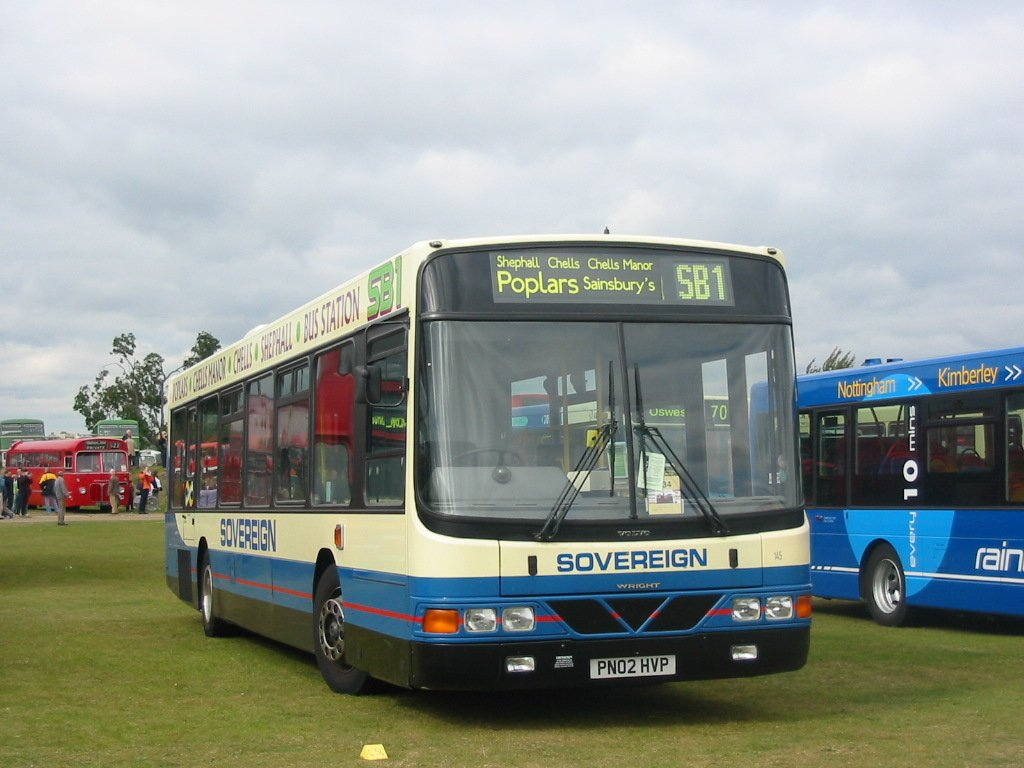
Sovereign Bus & Coach Wright Renown bodied Volvo B10BLE in September 2004

Sovereign Bus & Coach took over three former London Country North East depots in the 1989 split, namely Hatfield, Stevenage and St Albans. These were quickly joined by the operations and Stevenage depot of Jubilee Coaches, an independent which had previously taken several contracted routes from LCNE, but found it had bid too low for the routes and could no longer fulfil its operations. Hatfield garage was closed in 1989, and a new site established at Welwyn Garden City. Another operator, competitor Welwyn Hatfield Line, was taken over in January 1990 and retained as a separate subsidiary for several years. Most of Sovereign's Stevenage operation was sold to Luton & District (successors to London Country North West) in 1990. In 1991 the owning AJS Group was wound up. Two directors formed the Blazefield Group, and purchased Sovereign Bus & Coach and most of AJS Group's other operations. At the time, Sovereign operated 76 vehicles.

Some expansion followed. In October 1991 a new offshoot, Sovereign Buses (Harrow), was formed to operate a number of London Regional Transport contracts won by the company. In August 1994, the company's position in London strengthened with the acquisition of the 43-vehicle Borehamwood Travel Services, which brought tendered route 13 run with AEC Routemasters, under Sovereign operation. BTS was renamed Sovereign London and merged with the Harrow operation.

The company's fleet and operations remained largely static until 3 November 2002, when Blazefield sold Sovereign London to Transdev.

Sovereign contracted further in 2002 with the sale of the St Albans operation to Centrebus. Centrebus sold the depot to Uno in March 2008.

By 2002, Sovereign's fleet amounted to just 45 vehicles. Stevenage depot was closed and a smaller garage in the same town acquired, with Arriva Shires & Essex taking over the old site. Finally, in January 2005, the remainder of Sovereign was sold to Arriva Shires & Essex. Having previously acquired the successors to the former London Country North West, London Country South West and London Country South East companies as well as County Bus & Coach, Arriva now owned all of the former London Country Bus Services depots apart from the St Albans operation.
