= Green Line bus route 724 =

Home Counties bus route

724
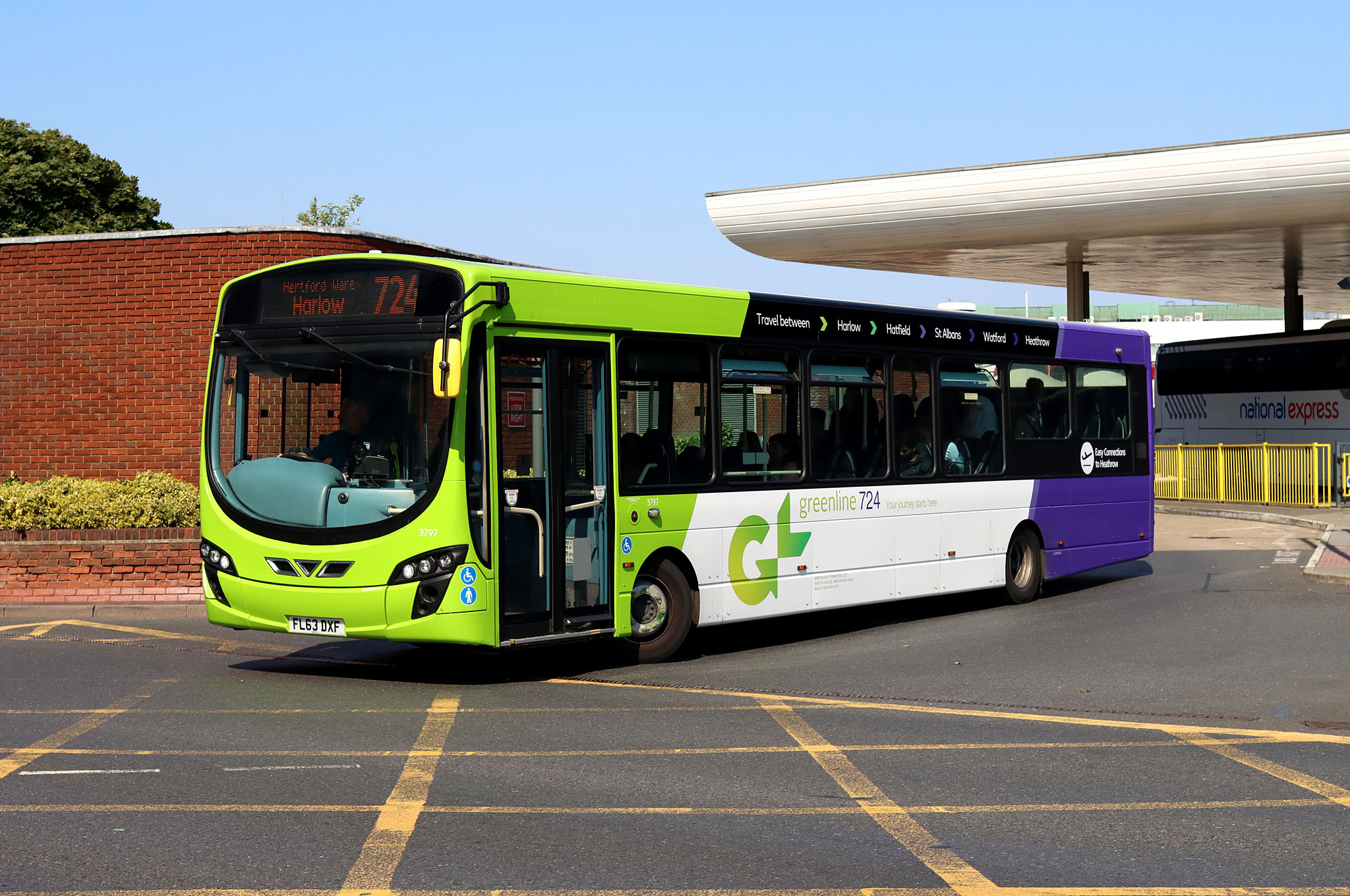

Overview
- Operator: Arriva Herts & Essex
- Garage: {{ubl|Harlow
- Vehicle: {{ubl|Alexander Dennis Enviro 200 MMC

Route
- Locale: Buckinghamshire; Essex; Greater London; Hertfordshire
- Termini: Harlow; Heathrow Central
- Length: 57 miles (92 km)

Service
- Frequency: Hourly
- Operates: Daily

Green Line route 724 is a bus service currently operated by Arriva Herts & Essex as part of the Green Line Coaches network. It runs on an orbital route round the north and western outskirts of London between Harlow and Heathrow Central bus station, and is partly funded by airport operator Heathrow Airport Holdings.

== History ==
Route 724 was started by Green Line Coaches (then part of London Transport) on 10 July 1966, on a route from High Wycombe to Romford via North London using AEC Regal coaches. By June 1972 it had been rerouted to start from Staines and serve Heathrow Airport. The sections of route between Staines and Heathrow, and between Harlow and Romford were later dropped.

Route 724 was included in the sale of London Country North West to a management buyout when privatised in January 1988, in turn passing to Luton & District Transport in 1990, British Bus in 1994 and finally the Cowie Group in August 1996. Today it is operated by Arriva Herts & Essex.

In December 1997, a fleet of nine Plaxton Prestige bodied DAF SB220s were purchased, with extra luggage space built in. These were some of the first low-floor buses to operate in the United Kingdom.

These were replaced in August 2006 by nine Mercedes-Benz Citaros. These were the result of a Quality Bus Partnership between Arriva Shires & Essex, BAA and Hertfordshire County Council. These buses seat 39 and also have extra luggage racking. Journey times were also improved.

In March 2008, the route was diverted to serve the new Heathrow Terminal 5. From 19 May, the service was withdrawn from Heathrow Terminal 4, with another new timetable introduced. Short workings on other parts of the route became routes 725 and 726.

In February 2021, the Citaros were replaced by a fleet of 8 Alexander Dennis Enviro200 MMCs, which were transferred from Arriva Kent Thameside.

In July 2022, part of the batch of ADL Enviro200 MMCs were replaced by Wright Pulsar 2 bodied VDL SB200s transferred from Leicester in return for the Enviro200s.

From 24 July 2022, additional early morning, late evening and weekend journeys were introduced in conjunction with the Heathrow Airport Partnership.

== Current route ==
Route 724 operates via these primary locations:

- Harlow bus station
- Ware
- Hertford bus station
- Hertford North station
- Panshanger
- Welwyn Garden City station
- New QEII Hospital
- Hatfield station
- Hatfield town centre
- St Albans City station
- St Albans Abbey station
- Garston
- Watford Junction station
- Croxley station
- Rickmansworth station
- Maple Cross
- Denham station
- Uxbridge station
- Heathrow Central bus station

== See also ==
- Hertfordshire Essex Rapid Transit - proposal for a bus rapid transit or similar system using a similar route
