= Maple Cross =

Village in Hertfordshire, England

Coordinates: 51.624515°N 0.509422°W

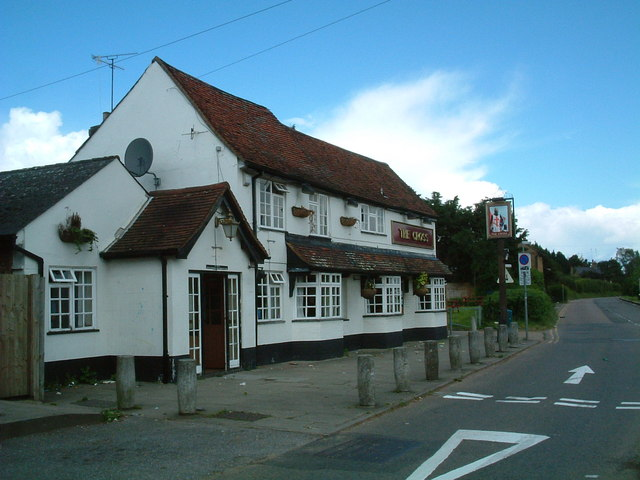
- The Maple Cross pub remains a defining landmark although now converted into dwellings.

- Location within Hertfordshire
- Population: 2,426 (2011. approx)
- OS grid reference: TQ034929
- District: Three Rivers
- Shire county: Hertfordshire
- Region: East
- Country: England
- Sovereign state: United Kingdom
- Post town: RICKMANSWORTH
- Postcode district: WD3
- Dialling code: 01923
- Police: Hertfordshire
- Fire: Hertfordshire
- Ambulance: East of England
- UK Parliament: South West Hertfordshire

Maple Cross is a village in Hertfordshire, England, which up until the Second World War consisted of an inn, a blacksmith's shop and a few cottages. Today there are around 800 postwar council houses. Some of these have been sold into private ownership. The area is close by junction 17 of the M25 motorway, which makes up the western boundary of the village. It lies on the western fringe of Rickmansworth, about 5 miles (8.0 km) west of Watford and 6 miles north of Uxbridge.

== Origin of the name ==
Maple Cross is thought to be a contraction of Maypole Cross and the village was once a place where maypole dancing took place. The nearby village of Mill End is on record as having complained to the lord of the manor about the noise of the dancing in 1588.

== History and geography ==
The village stands on the western edge of the River Colne flood plain with the river a third of a mile to the east. It sits on the A412 Denham Way which itself follows the Old Uxbridge Road along the dry land above the floodplain on the river's west bank. To the west the land rises gently towards the dip slope of the Chiltern Hills, although there are some local steep inclines where dry valleys in the chalk make deep incisions. Two routes to the west join the Uxbridge Road at this point, one to the village of Chalfont St Peter, the other to Chalfont St Giles. They made it a convenient place to stop and rest and possible gather for May festivals.

The ancient route known as Old Shire Lane runs in a north south direction at the summit of the rising high ground half a mile to the west. It is at least of Saxon age as it designated the boundary between the kingdoms of Wessex and Mercia. Today it forms the boundary between the counties of Hertfordshire and Buckinghamshire. Parts of it take the form of a hollow way from centuries of use embedding the path into the earth.

Until the Second World War it was little more than a hamlet with some cottages for agricultural workers and two businesses providing services to travellers on the road, an inn, and a farriers.

After WW2 it was intentionally developed as a dormitory for workers in the nearby towns and at the new sewage treatment plant by the river.

The village has no churches, historically it lacked the population to support one and its residents were part of the parish of St Thomas's West Hyde a mile to the south. There are two historic buildings, The Cross Inn which dates back to the seventeenth century and a barn just to east of the Maple Cross road junction of a similar age.

The public house called The Cross stands on Denham Way, the main road from Rickmansworth to Uxbridge and is a listed building with parts dating back to at least the 1700s. In 2010 the pub was sold by its brewery to property developers who intended to demolish it and build new homes on its site and car park. Strong local opposition prevented demolition and the original historic building still stands, converted into dwellings with a small close on the rest of the pub's site.

== Commercial ==
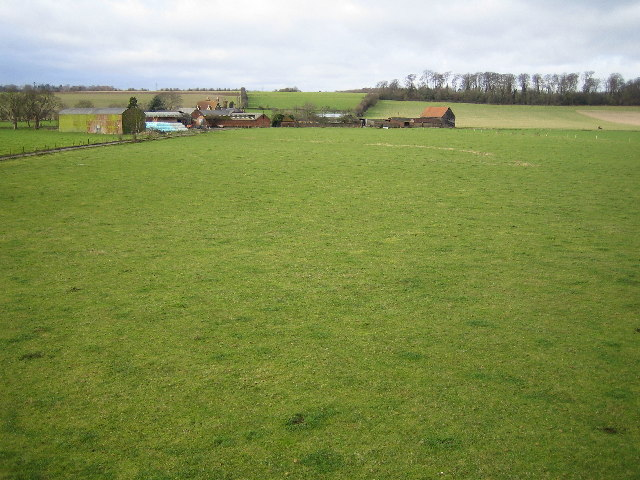
Woodoaks Farm

The area was agricultural right up to the Second World War and arable and livestock farming continue today on the surrounding land. The area east of The Cross and close to the river was used for gravel extraction facilitated by the Grand Union canal which made transport of bulk material relatively easy. The river also gave rise to several mills from the 16th century onwards.

A line of clear water springs at the edge of the Colne flood plain provided an excellent site for the cultivation of watercress which requires ponds fed by fresh flowing water. William Bradbery, the watercress pioneer moved his business here in 1820. One road in Maple Cross was named Bradbery, by the Three Rivers District Council in the 1960s to commemorate him

Today some multi-national businesses have offices in Maple Cross in a designated industrial and business area east of the village, attracted by its easy access to the motorway network. The UK headquarters of construction company Skanska is based here. The corporate functions of the combined Cadbury and Trebor Bassett confectionery business moved to the area in 2000.

Woodoaks Farm is a farm to the west of the A412 road. It was taken over by the Soil Association organic farming association in 2020 as a demonstration organic farm, nature reserve and visitor attraction with restaurant.

== Transport ==
Maple Cross is bounded by the M25 motorway and a spur from junction 17, designated as Maple Cross, runs to the village and the Denham Way. The areas main thoroughfare, Denham Way, was built in the 1950s as an improvement to The Old Uxbridge Road, and forms part of the A412.

The area is served by the Green Line bus route 724 which runs from Heathrow Airport to Harlow, Essex, via Watford and the local Arriva Shires & Essex 322 which begins in Maple Cross and runs to Hemel Hempstead via Watford. Bus route R1 and R2 runs from Mount Vernon Hospital via Harefield and Rickmansworth. It normally terminates at Maple Cross, but extends its journey to Chorleywood twice per day via Heronsgate and The Swillet.

The Grand Junction Canal, later to be renamed as a part of the Grand Union Canal was built in 1798 alongside the River Colne and remains in use today.

The planned High Speed 2 London to Birmingham high speed rail link will pass half a mile to the south of the village on an embankment.

== Sewage treatment plant ==
Maple Cross is the location of the Thames Water Maple Lodge Sewage Treatment Works which was opened in 1950. The giant plant, with its sister site at Blackbirds Farm in Aldenham serve the whole of West Hertfordshire; an area with a population of 557,000 people.

The plant was used in 1952 to test diffused aeration technology and a diffused-air activated sludge purification system has been in continuous use since. The cleaned effluent from this process is discharged into the nearby Grand Union Canal.

Sludge settled from the incoming sewage is treated by retention in enclosed heated anaerobic digestion tanks, a by-product of this process being methane gas which is used for on-site electrical power generation. The main product, digested sludge, is "cake" in industrial centrifuges before disposal to land as fertiliser. Sludge from the plant was burnt to generate "green" electricity for the Millennium Dome.

The sewage plant became famous when it was used as a storage facility for the toxic waste perfluorooctane sulfonate (PFOS) after it was used to extinguish the fire at the Buncefield Oil Terminal.

== Nature Reserve ==
There is a 40-acre nature reserve on land owned by Thames Water and formerly used for gravel extraction, adjacent to the sewage treatment plant. It includes lakes and wetlands that provide a habitat for wildfowl, with a number of bird hides. The reserve is leased to, and managed by, the Maple Lodge Conservation Society, founded in 1983. Access is normally restricted to members of the Society, but open weekends were held in May as part of Rickmansworth's 'Ricky Week' event. Since covid, and the cessation of Ricky Week, open weekends have been held on an ad hoc basis

== Sport and leisure ==
The Maple Cross Recreation Ground situated on Denham Way is operated by Three Rivers Local Authority and has open air sports facilities of two full sized football pitches, one junior sized football pitch, two tennis courts and a cricket pitch available for public use via its booking line. There is also car parking and a sports pavilion with changing rooms.

== Cultural references ==
British heavy metal band, Girlschool, released an album entitled Nightmare at Maple Cross in 1986.

The village achieved notoriety in 2021 with the news that a flock of South American rhea birds had been sighted on the estate, with police issuing warnings to the public.
