= UCOC =

UCOC may refer to:

- United Counties Omnibus Company, an English bus company
- UCoC, the Wikimedia Foundation global policy (foundation:Policy:Universal Code of Conduct)

== See also ==
- United Church of Christ (UCC)
