= Citibus Tours =

English bus operator

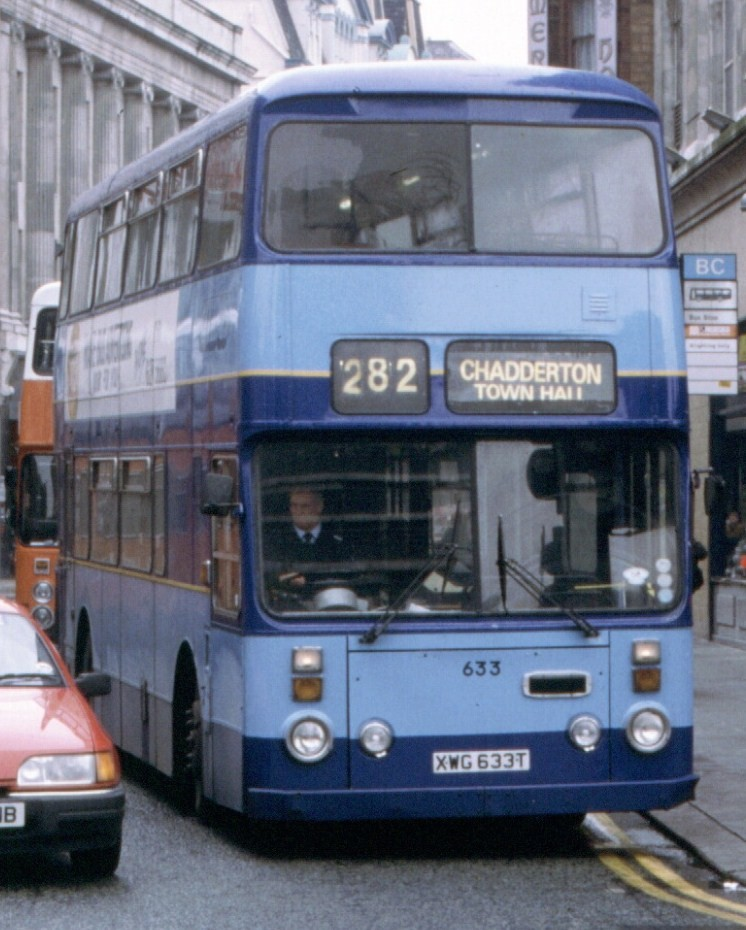
- Roe bodied Leyland Atlantean
- Parent: Lyton Travel Group
- Founded: 1979
- Ceased operation: 1996
- Headquarters: Chadderton
- Service area: Greater Manchester
- Service type: Bus operator

Citibus was an English bus operator in Greater Manchester.

== History ==
Citibus was formed as a coach operator in 1979. In 1983 it obtained a road service licence, and began to compete with GM Buses on their Centreline route in Manchester, and on the route between Manchester and Blackley, in early 1986. The Centreline route was abandoned following accusations of aggressive tactics by GM Buses drivers. Further routes started following bus deregulation in October 1986 linked Manchester to Middleton, Oldham and Ashton-under-Lyne.

In July 1993 the 41-vehicle operation was purchased by Lynton Travel, owners of County Bus & Coach in South-East England. Citibus was then sold on to GM Buses North in 1995.

It may have been GM Buses's intention to run this as a low cost operator but it did not last long as GM Buses North was purchased by FirstBus in February 1996 and the operations were merged into First Manchester.

== Vehicles and liveries ==
Citibus' original bus fleet consisted of Leyland Panthers new to Isle of Man Transport in a light blue and black livery. From 1988 onwards these were replaced by Leyland Atlanteans, most of which were new to South Yorkshire Transport, and the livery was changed to two-tone blue. Under Lynton Travel ownership a few vehicles were transferred from County Bus & Coach, including a number of Mercedes-Benz 0709D minibuses, but few Citibus vehicles survived long after sale to GM Buses.
