= Birch Brothers =

English bus and coach operator

Birch Brothers was a bus and coach operator in south east England.

== History ==
William Birch started running horse-drawn cabs in London in 1837. After his death in 1846 his widow, Elizabeth, took over the business and in 1847 extended it to include the running of omnibuses, operating a service between Pimlico and Mansion House. The company was divided between her two sons on her death in 1874. Four years later the two sons parted company and ran separate businesses, John Manley operating buses and mail vans (having obtained a substantial contract with the Post Office), and William Samuel operating buses and cabs. In 1885 William Samuel's son, William Henry, joined his father, but thirteen years later started his own omnibus business.

In 1887, John Manley inaugurated the London–Brighton horse drawn night parcel mail and in 1891 the London–Oxford mail which was operated until 1908. In 1889 the two brothers again joined forces and formed the private company of Birch Bros., Limited. By 1907 the company was operating 16 motor omnibuses, but a series of problems led to the company's withdrawal from the venture. As a result of fierce competition by motor buses, horse-drawn omnibus operation ceased in 1912.

In 1919 Birch commenced operating coaches on "See Britain" tours and in 1925 re-entered the London omnibus business. This continued until 1933, when the London Passenger Transport Act was passed, resulting in the compulsory acquisition of the company's 30 buses by the London Passenger Transport Board.

Birch launched a service between London, Hitchin and Bedford in 1928, extending to Rushden in 1929. The company built a garage and bus station at Rushden in 1937. In 1938 the company purchased a number of existing operators running services in Bedford, Henlow, Hitchin and Luton, with another garage at Henlow Camp built in the same year. In 1952 the company pioneered the operation of the first diesel-engined taxicab, converting all of its vehicles to diesel engines within a year; by 1956, the Company had converted over 1,250 cabs owned by other London operators.

On 2 November 1959, the company operated the first regular service journey from London on the new M1 Motorway. The new route, numbered 203M, linked the city with Bedford and Rushden.

The two remaining coach routes were given up to United Counties Omnibus in September 1969. The coach hire business was retained until 1971, when it was sold to George Ewer Ltd., and Birch Brothers closed down.

== Routes ==
Number	Towns	Service
203	London - Welwyn - Hitchin - Bedford - Rushden	Daily
203M	London - M1 Motorway - Bedford - Rushden	Daily (from 1959)
204	Hitchin - Whitwell - Welwyn	Daily except Sunday
205	Welwyn - Kimpton - Luton	Daily
206	Whitwell - Luton	Thursday, Saturday and Sunday only
206	Welwyn - Whitwell - Luton	Saturday and Sunday only
209	Henlow Camp - Holwell - Hitchin	Daily
210	Harrold - Odell - Sharnbrook - Rushden	Weekdays only
211	Harrold - Carlton - Pavenham - Bedford	Daily
212	Henlow Camp - Gravenhurst - Shillington - Luton	Daily
213	Gravenhurst - Campton - Shefford - Bedford	Saturdays only
215	Luton - Kimpton - Knebworth - Stevenage	Mondays, Tuesdays, Thursdays and Fridays only
225	Hitchin - Henlow - Gravenhurst	Tuesdays only
225	Hitchin - Henlow - Shillington	Saturdays only

== Bibliography and further reading ==
- British Bus Fleets No. 11: London Coach Operators; Ian Allan, 1962
- Buses Illustrated No. 11 (July 1952) by John Manley Birch
- Buses Illustrated No. 12 (October 1952) by John Manley Birch
- PSV Circle Fleet History PN3 (1980)
