= United Counties Omnibus =

British bus operating company

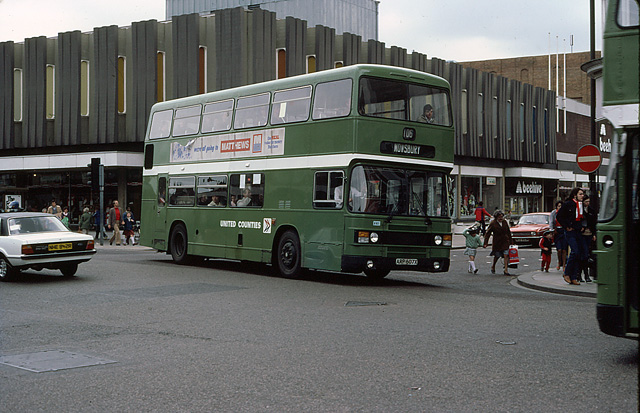
- Leyland Olympian in Bedford in May 1982
- Parent: National Bus Company
- Founded: 24 September 1921
- Ceased operation: 1987
- Service area: Bedfordshire; Buckinghamshire; North Hertfordshire; Huntingdonshire; Northamptonshire
- Service type: Bus operator

United Counties Omnibus was an English bus company, operating in Northamptonshire, Bedfordshire, Buckinghamshire and parts of surrounding counties.

== Early history ==
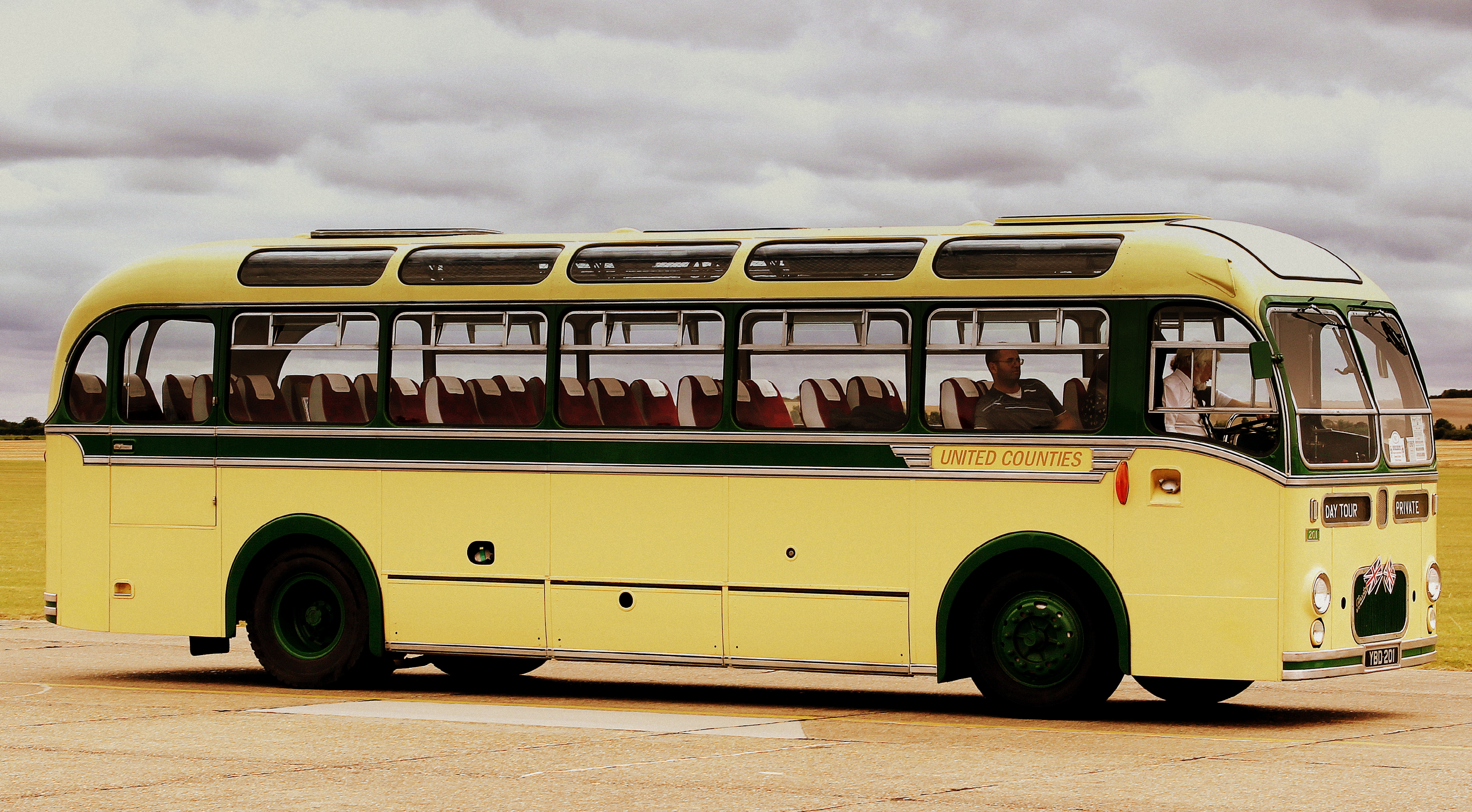
Preserved Eastern Coach Works bodied Bristol MW6G in September 2012

On 24 September 1921, the United Counties Omnibus & Road Transport Co Limited acquired the assets of the Wellingborough Motor Omnibus Co Limited, which began in May 1913. The majority shareholder was Tillings. At this time, the previous livery of blue and white with red wheels was replaced by the standard Tilling livery (green with a cream band) and retained until replaced by National Bus Company green (and always with a white band) in 1972. In September 1933, the company's name was changed to its present title, United Counties Omnibus Company Limited.

In 1933, the company operated 154 buses on services throughout Northamptonshire, with some services terminating just over adjacent county boundaries, plus special services to seaside places and Whipsnade Zoo during the summer. In December 1933, services around Aylesbury were acquired from the Aylesbury Omnibus Company. The company continued to expand, by buying out smaller bus and coach operators. The garage at Stony Stratford operated by a fellow Tillings company, Eastern National was transferred to United Counties. The company built new garages in several towns, a new headquarters, with major engineering workshops, in Bedford Road, Northampton, and a central covered bus station at Derngate, Northampton, thus putting it into a good shape to withstand the rigours of wartime operation.

The company entered the long-distance coach service market in 1933, when it bought Allchin & Sons of Northampton, which ran coach services to London, Bournemouth, Torquay and several Midlands cities. In 1934, it acquired a route between Oxford and London from its fellow Tillings subsidiary, Eastern Counties. In 1934, it was one of the founders of the Associated Motorways consortium, to which it transferred its Bournemouth and Torquay routes.

== Nationalisation ==
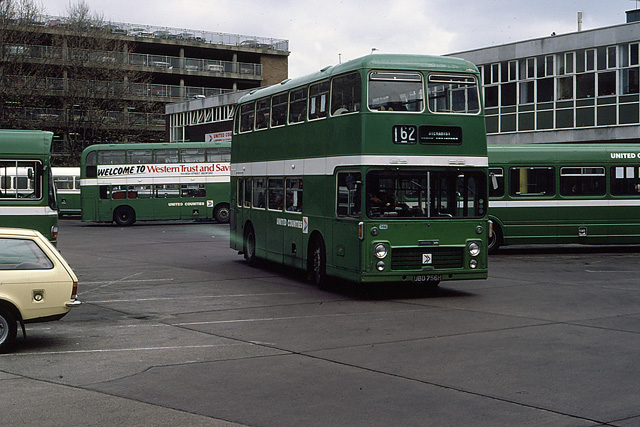
Eastern Coach Works bodied Bristol VR in Bedford in May 1982

In 1948, the Tilling Group sold its bus interests to the government. United Counties therefore became a state-owned company, under the control of the British Transport Commission.

The new regime resulted in a major expansion of the company's area of operations. In 1952 Eastern National's operations in Bedfordshire, Buckinghamshire, North Hertfordshire and Huntingdonshire, with some 250 vehicles, were transferred to United Counties. This practically doubled the size of the company. At the same time the Oxford to London service was transferred to South Midland.

On 1 January 1963, United Counties was included in the transfer of the British Transport Commission's transport assets to the state-owned Transport Holding Company, which in turn passed to the state-owned National Bus Company on 1 January 1969.

On 14 September 1969, United Counties took over Birch Brothers giving it another express service into London besides its Nottingham – Leicester - London route. On 1 January 1970, it took over Luton Corporation buses. There followed a period when the company was under severe pressure in coping with the maintenance of the Luton combined fleet and for a time had to forgo its duty to deal with the recovery of fellow National Bus Company subsidiaries’ coaches broken down on its allocated and very busy section of the M1 motorway.

Towards the end of the 1970s, better relationships were negotiated with county councils and the Milton Keynes Development Corporation. The company was then able to make strides in greatly improving its maintenance facilities with major work at Northampton depot, Wellingborough, Bedford, Milton Keynes (including a 100 vehicle Winterhill depot on a green field site) and Luton.

== Privatisation ==
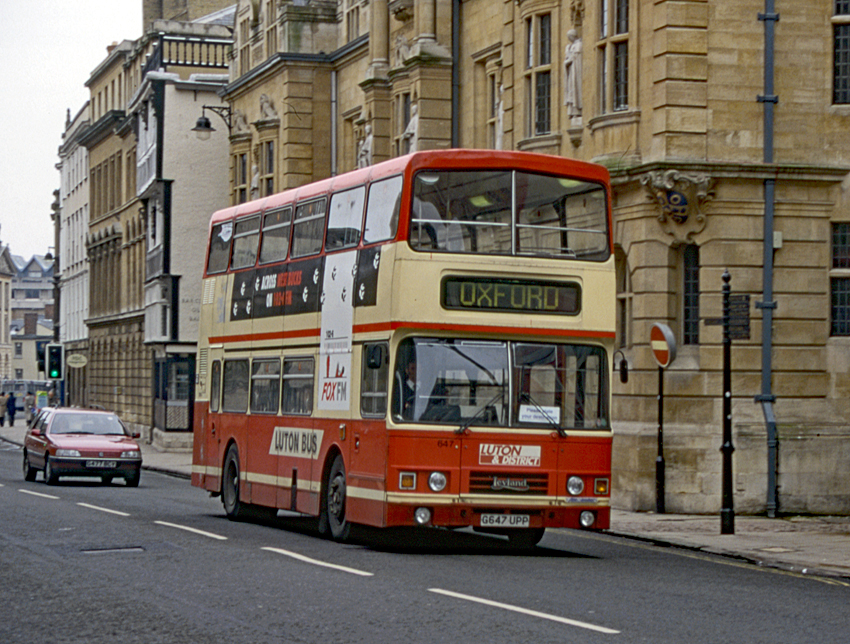
Luton & District Leyland Olympian in Oxford (1996)

In 1980, the government embarked on a programme of deregulation and privatisation of bus services. To make them more marketable, the larger subsidiaries of the National Bus Company were split up. United Counties was split up operationally from 1 January 1986 and the new companies were privatised in 1987:

- Luton & District Transport Company(Aylesbury, Hitchin and Luton garages), sold August 1987 in a management buyout
- Milton Keynes Citybus(Milton Keynes depot), sold in a management buyout
- United Counties Engineering (The central workshops part of the head office site)
- United Counties Omnibus Company retained the rest (almost its original pre-1952 area plus Bedford, Biggleswade and Huntingdon), sold in November 1987 to Stagecoach

== Today's operation ==
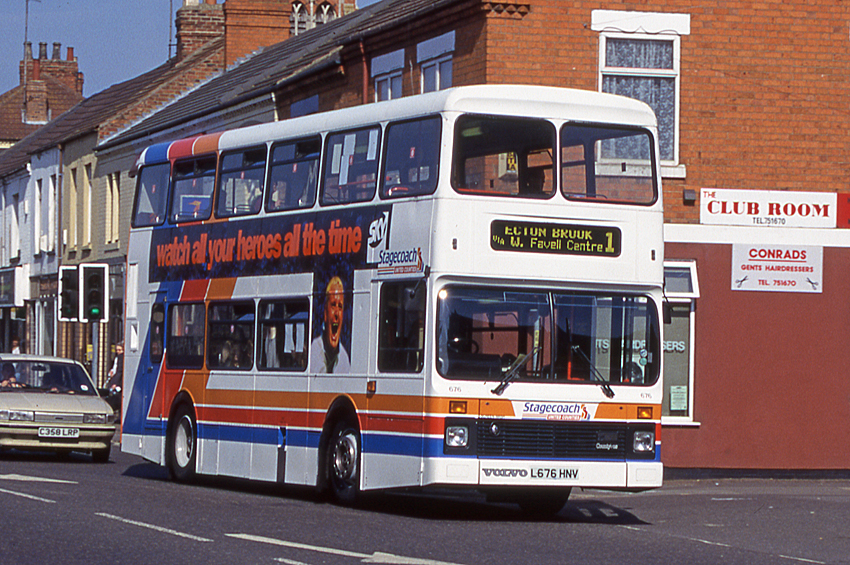
United Counties Volvo Olympian in Northampton

Stagecoach retained the United Counties name until 1999. After Stagecoach acquired adjacent operator Cambus in 1997, an inquiry by the Office of Fair Trading ordered that Stagecoach sell the Huntingdon operations. but, in 2008, Stagecoach re-acquired the Huntingdon operations, now Stagecoach in the Fens, part of Stagecoach in Cambridgeshire. The remaining part of Stagecoach United Counties became Stagecoach East in 2000, trading as Stagecoach in Northants and Stagecoach in Bedford with the legal company name remaining as United Counties Omnibus Company Limited. In 2010, the company was split, with the Bedford depot merging with Stagecoach in Cambridgeshire to form a new Stagecoach East and the Northamptonshire depots merging with Stagecoach in Warwickshire to form Stagecoach Midlands and mostly Stagecoach East Midlands. However, the trading names and the legal titles remained as before, until October 2014, when the "United Counties" registered address was changed to match the Warwickshire operations and thus "Midland Red (South) Ltd and United Counties Omnibus Company are registered as being based in Northampton.

Luton & District was bought in 1994 by British Bus, which, in turn, was purchased by the Cowie Group on 1 August 1996 and rebranded as Arriva the Shires in 1998.

Milton Keynes Citybus was acquired by Cambus (a privatised part of Eastern Counties), which was, itself, sold to Stagecoach in 1996. However, after the inquiry by the Office of Fair Trading, Stagecoach sold both the Milton Keynes and Huntingdon depot operations to Julian Peddle on 2 May 1997, who formed Premier Buses and MK Metro. Peddle soon sold the Huntingdon depot operations to Blazefield and eventually sold MK Metro to Arriva in February 2006. An OFT inquiry allowed MK Metro to pass to Arriva who, initially, ran it as a separate operation, but have since started to brand buses as Arriva vehicles. Blazefield sold the Huntingdon & District operation to Cavalier Travel in November 2003, who sold that operation to Stagecoach Cambridge on 31 March 2008.
