= Stagecoach Cambridgeshire =

Stagecoach Cambridgeshire was a bus company in England, which was part of the Stagecoach Group.

Its headquarters were in Cambridge, and it operated services under the following brand names:

- Stagecoach in Cambridge, the trading name of Cambus Ltd. (demerged from the Eastern Counties Omnibus Company in 1984)
- Stagecoach in Peterborough, the trading name of the Viscount Bus and Coach Company Ltd. (demerged as a subsidiary of Cambus Holdings Ltd. in 1989)
- Stagecoach in Huntingdonshire, the trading name of Stagecoach in The Fens Ltd. (originally part of the United Counties Omnibus Company operated by Stagecoach East from 1989 until the company acquired Cambus Holdings in 1995 and opted to divest the Huntingdon and District business to prevent the acquisition being referred to the Monopolies and Mergers Commission; the operations were reacquired by Stagecoach in 2008)

In 2010, these services were merged into Stagecoach East (formed in 1999, from Stagecoach in Northants and Stagecoach in Bedford); at the same time, Stagecoach in Northants was transferred to Stagecoach Midlands.

== Depots ==
- Cambridge
- Ely
- Huntingdon (Fenstanton)
- Peterborough
