= London Country Bus Services =

Bus company operating services in South East England

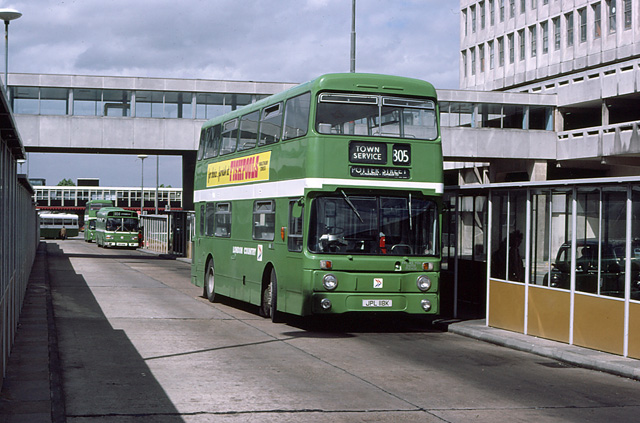
- Park Royal bodied Leyland Atlantean in Harlow in August 1979
- Parent: National Bus Company
- Founded: 1 January 1970; 56 years ago
- Ceased operation: 22 April 1988; 38 years ago
- Service area: South East England
- Service type: Bus operator

London Country Bus Services was a bus company that operated in South East England from 1970 until 1986, when it was split up and later sold as part of the bus deregulation programme.

== History ==
From 1933, London Passenger Transport Board ran public transport services across the London Passenger Transport Area, with an approximate radius of 30 miles (48 km) from Charing Cross, extending beyond the boundaries of what later officially became Greater London, to Baldock in the North, Brentwood in the East, Horsham in the South and High Wycombe in the West.

=== Formation ===
In the late 1960s, it was decided that the responsibilities of the London Transport Board were to be shrunk to the area controlled by the Greater London Council (GLC). London Transport's green Country Area buses and Green Line cross-London express coaches would be passed to the National Bus Company (NBC), with the red Central Area buses passing from the London Transport Board to a new London Transport Executive, controlled by the GLC.

Gun Carriage logo used before the standard National Bus Company brand was introduced in 1972

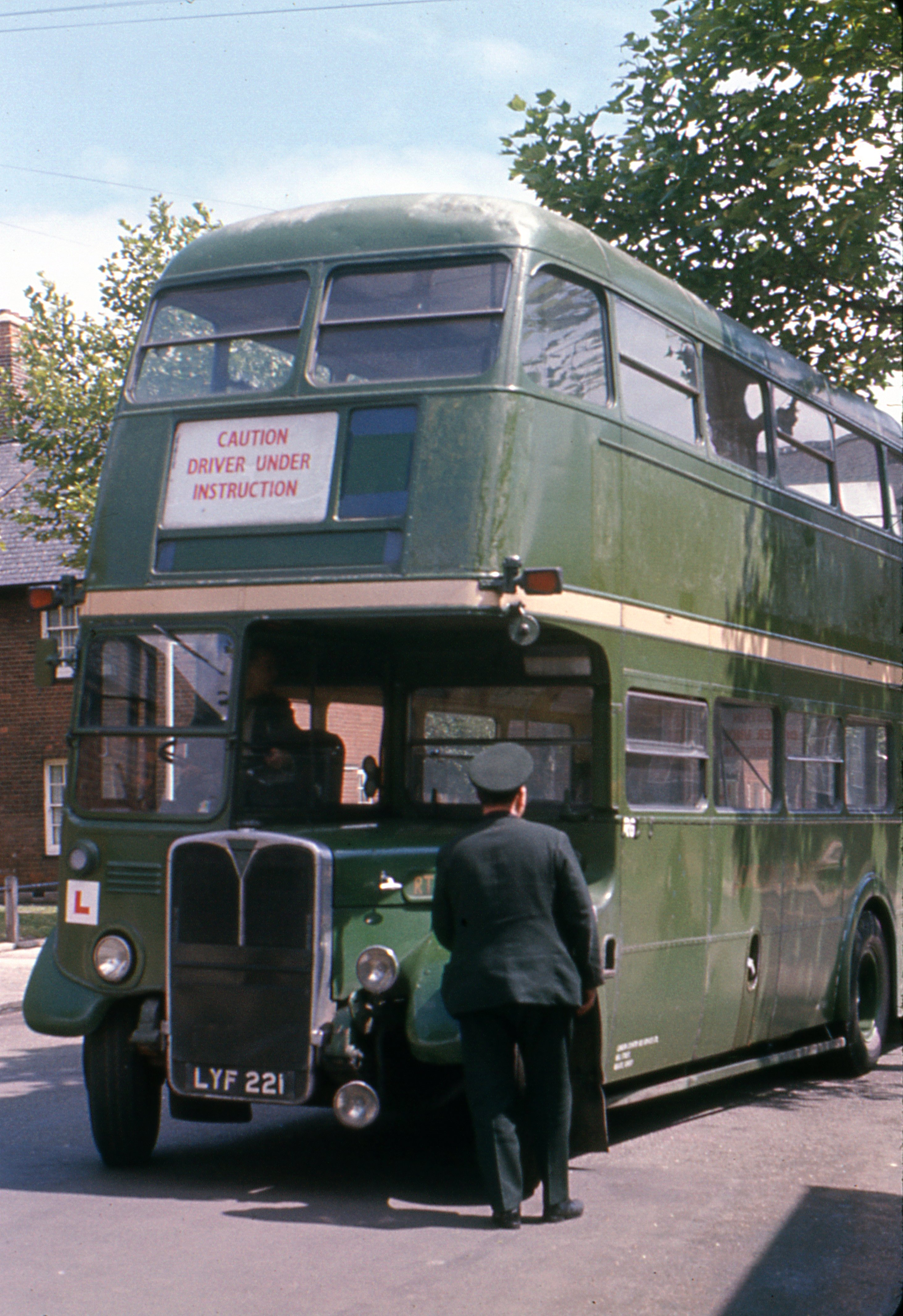
AEC Regent III RT in 1972

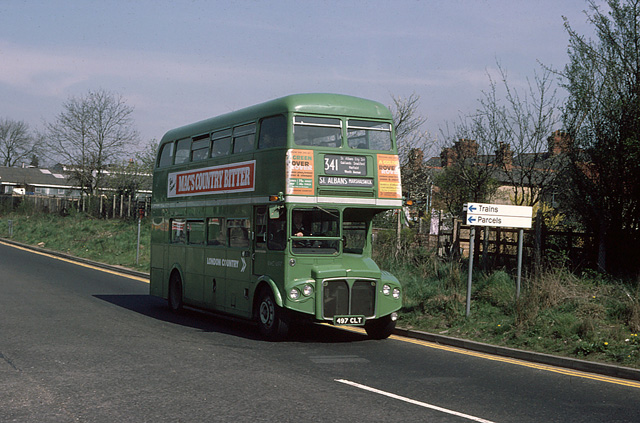
AEC Routemaster in St Albans in May 1976

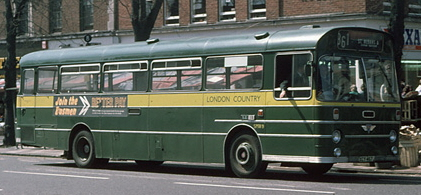
AEC Swift in St Albans in May 1976

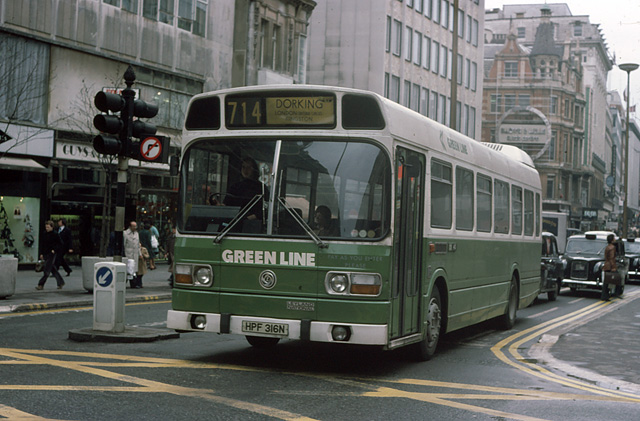
Green Line Leyland National on Oxford Street in July 1976

London Country Bus Services Ltd was incorporated on 9 October 1968 as a subsidiary of the nationalised Transport Holding Company in anticipation of the Transport (London) Act 1969, which took effect on 1 January 1970. The company had a nominal share capital of £100 of which only £2 was paid up. The original subscribers were J D Tattersall and E M Walker, both employees of the Transport Holding Company. The company's paid up capital remained the same throughout its existence.

London Country's territory was likened to a circle around London with a hole in the middle, operating in Bedfordshire, Berkshire, Buckinghamshire, Essex, Hertfordshire, Kent, Surrey and Sussex. The company was NBC's biggest subsidiary, starting life with 1,267 buses and coaches. The fleet was very elderly, being mainly 484 AEC Regent III RT double-deckers and 413 AEC Regal IV RF single-deckers, with eight Daimler Fleetlines, three Leyland Atlanteans, 209 AEC Routemasters, 14 AEC Reliances and 109 AEC Merlins.

Staff who were employed before 1 January 1970 retained free travel throughout the original London Transport area. This arrangement continues today, with free pass wording changed to account for bus deregulation.

=== New vehicles ===
Steps were taken to reduce the age of the fleet, and NBC quickly ordered 90 Park Royal bodied Leyland Atlanteans. In 1970/71 London Transport's last Country order, for 138 AEC Swifts, was delivered. The Atlantean soon became London Country's standard double deck bus, and by 1981 there were 291 in the fleet. The highest fleet number was AN293, but AN98 and AN99 had been previously lost to fire. Most were bodied by Park Royal, with some by Roe to the same design and 30 Metro Cammell Weymann bodied Atlanteans, diverted from a Midland Red order. There were also 11 Leyland-engined, Godstone-based Daimler Fleetlines diverted from Western Welsh, becoming the first NBC-ordered buses in the fleet, just before the Atlanteans. The only other London Country double-deckers in the 1970s were 15 Bristol VRTs, rare highbridge Eastern Coach Works bodied examples. These were allocated to Grays garage in 1977 but were quickly moved on.

There was also activity in the single-decker fleet. Some of the AEC Regal IV RFs had been refurbished in the 1960s, with twin headlights, curved windscreens, new side mouldings and improved interiors, mainly allocated to Green Line services. There were 14 Willowbrook bodied AEC Reliances at Hertford garage, which had been bought by London Transport in 1965. By 1975 they were on bus work, which some thought was idiosyncratic when vehicles twice as old were still on Green Line work.

The Green Line services were largely operated by AEC Routemaster coaches and AEC Regal IV RFs. NBC ordered 90 AEC Reliances with 45-seat Park Royal bodies, which were originally in Green Line two-tone green but were quickly repainted in NBC local coach livery. For the orbital route 725 between Windsor and Gravesend, 15 Alexander bodied AEC Swifts were purchased, but were soon demoted to Gravesend local services.

=== Standard fleets ===
In 1972, the Leyland National, NBC and British Leyland's joint project, became the standard in most NBC fleets. London Country bought over 500 examples, the world's largest fleet. They mainly replaced RFs, RTs and Routemasters. Some RFs were kept in areas where smaller, lighter vehicles were needed, until NBC decided on its smaller standard bus, the Bristol LH. London Country bought its first examples of the type in 1973, with more batches bought up until 1977.

Throughout the 1980s NBC had had large numbers of double-deck Leyland Olympians delivered. From 1982 until 1984 these were purchased with Roe bodies, but from 1985 they had Eastern Coach Works bodies to the same style. London Country operated 75.

=== The end ===
Bus deregulation under the Transport Act 1985, resulted in the company being divided into smaller divisions and sold off.

London Country was split into four bus operating companies, and 2 other companies on 7 September 1986:

- London Country North East
- London Country North West
- London Country South East
- London Country South West
- Gatwick Engineering Ltd.
- Green Line Travel Ltd.

These companies were privatised during 1988, among the last of the bus privatisations - London Country Bus (North East) Ltd was the last of all its subsidiaries to be disposed of by the National Bus Company. The purchasers were:

- London Country North East: sold 22 April 1988 to the AJS Group, which split the company into two from January 1989, County Bus & Coach and Sovereign Bus & Coach. County was sold to its management in 1990 and eventually became Arriva East Herts & Essex, part of Arriva Shires & Essex. The Grays garage was transferred to Arriva Southern Counties in 2002. Sovereign was sold to the Blazefield Group in 1991. These operations are also now part of Arriva Shires & Essex, except for the St Albans depot which was sold to Centrebus but then passed to Uno, with the operation transferred to Hatfield.
- London Country North West: sold 5 January 1988 to a management buyout further sold on to Luton & District Transport in 1990, now part of Arriva Shires & Essex.
- London Country South East: renamed Kentish Bus in April 1987, sold 15 March 1988 to Northumbria Motor Services (through its parent company Proudmutual Limited), itself sold to British Bus in 1994, which passed to the Cowie Group in 1996 and now part of Arriva Southern Counties. Bus Service 401 had joined the London Transport network in 1988.
- London Country South West: sold 19 February 1988 to Drawlane Limited, which became the British Bus group, itself sold to the Cowie Group in 1996, During 1997 the brand name was changed to Arriva serving Surrey & West Sussex, although there were in effect 3 companies holding 'O' licences formed from the former L&C companies. The company was the last to adopt Arriva branding and many buses were still in L&C colours until 2000. In January 2000 it became part of Arriva Southern Counties and was managed from Maidstone. The last of the companies Arriva Guildford and West Surrey ceased operations in December 2021, with Stagecoach taking over much of the work. Bus Service 403 (1986), 405 (2001), 406 (2001), 418 (23 February 2002) and 465 (28 June 1997) had however joined the London Transport network, in return and exchange for service 218.

London Country Bus Services Ltd was dissolved on 8 August 1997 after beginning the process of members' voluntary liquidation on 1 June 1990.
