= Arriva Herts & Essex =

Subsidiary bus operator of Arriva UK Bus

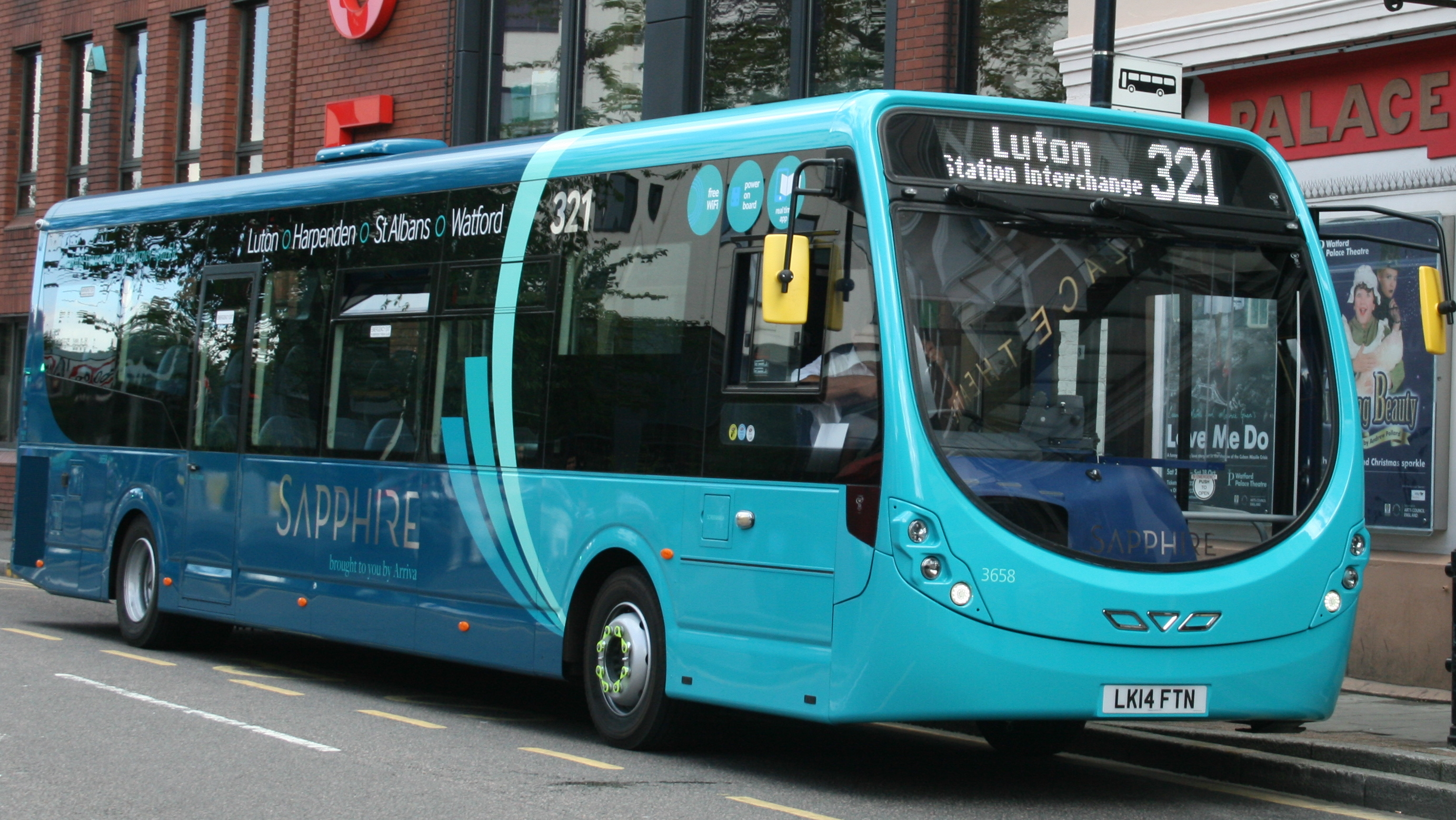
- An Arriva Wright StreetLite DF in Watford in 2014
- Parent: Arriva UK Bus
- Founded: 1998
- Locale: South East; East
- Service area: Bedfordshire; Buckinghamshire; Berkshire; Essex; Hertfordshire; Oxfordshire; Greater London
- Service type: Bus services
- Routes: 45
- Depots: 5

Arriva Herts & Essex is a bus operator providing services in Bedfordshire, Buckinghamshire, Essex and Hertfordshire, with services extending to Berkshire, Oxfordshire and Greater London. Until 2002 its operations included Colchester. It is a subsidiary of Arriva UK Bus.

Operations are split between two registered companies, Arriva East Herts & Essex Limited and Arriva The Shires Limited.

== Arriva East Herts & Essex ==
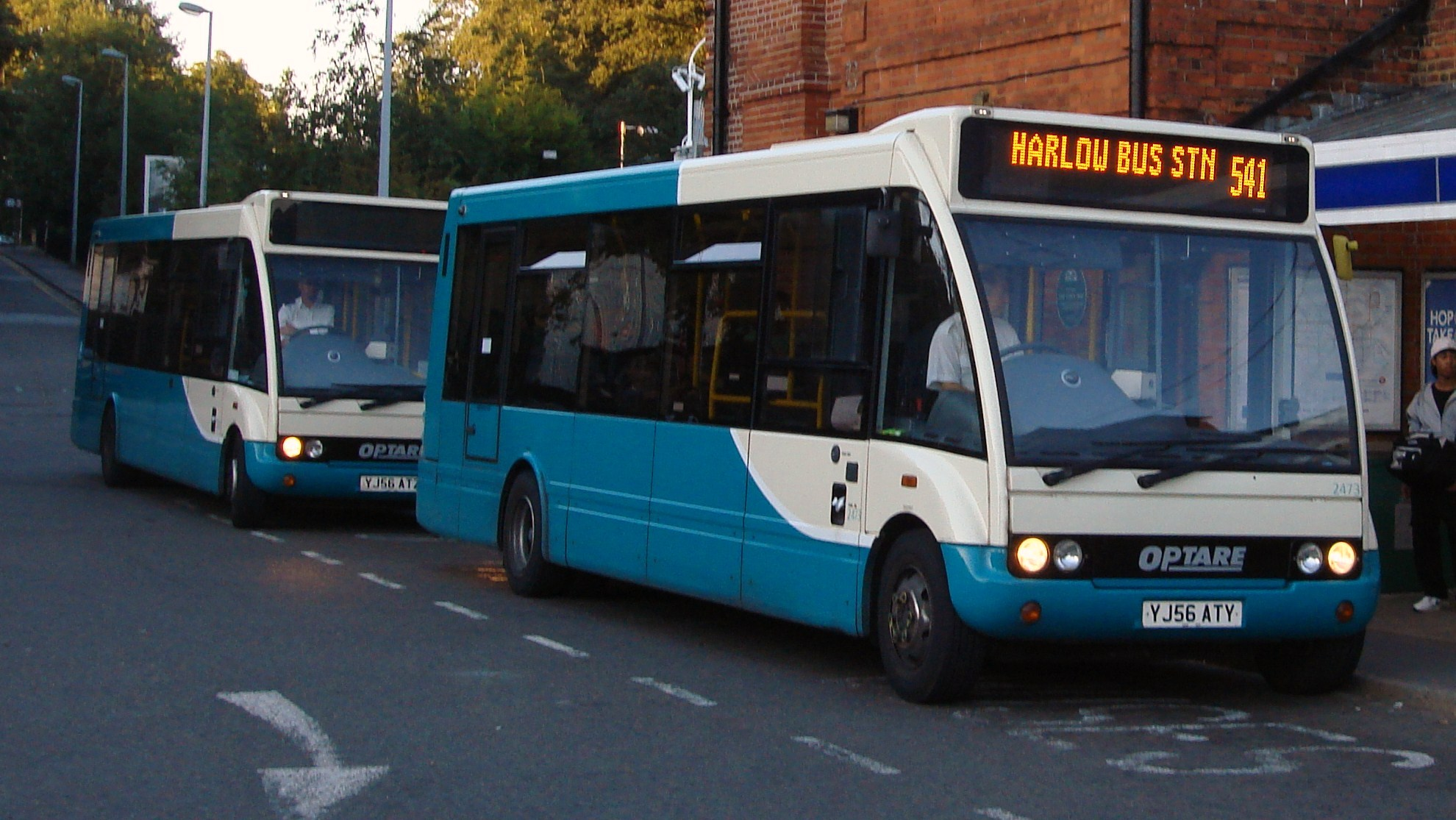
Two Optare Solos at Epping Underground station in September 2008

Arriva East Herts & Essex Limited is based in Harlow, and operate two bus garages in Harlow (Fourth Avenue) and Ware (Marsh Lane).

Arriva East Herts & Essex emerged from London Country North East (LCNE), one of the successor companies of London Country Bus Services. LCNE was broken in two. One of the successor companies, County Bus & Coach, with depots at Harlow, Hertford and Grays, was bought by its management in 1990. In 1994 County was sold to West Midlands Travel, itself bought by National Express in 1995. The Cowie Group bought County from National Express in 1996. County Bus & Coach was renamed Arriva East Herts & Essex in April 1998.

Cowie had also acquired Southend Transport and Colchester Borough Transport with its acquisition of British Bus in 1996. Both companies became part of Arriva East Herts & Essex, but in 2002 were transferred to Arriva Southern Counties together with the former County depot at Grays.

=== Harlow ===
Harlow garage was opened by London Transport on 22 May 1963 to serve Harlow New Town and also to replace Epping garage. Harlow was allocated 25 AEC Regent III RTs, 16 AEC Routemasters (to operate Green Line routes 718, 720 & 720A), seven RFs and two coach RFs. London Country North East and County Bus used the garage until The Cowie Group purchased County Bus in 1997.

This was previously an Arriva East Herts & Essex garage, but it is now part of the Tellings-Golden Miller subsidiary with buses are branded as Network Harlow.

=== Ware ===
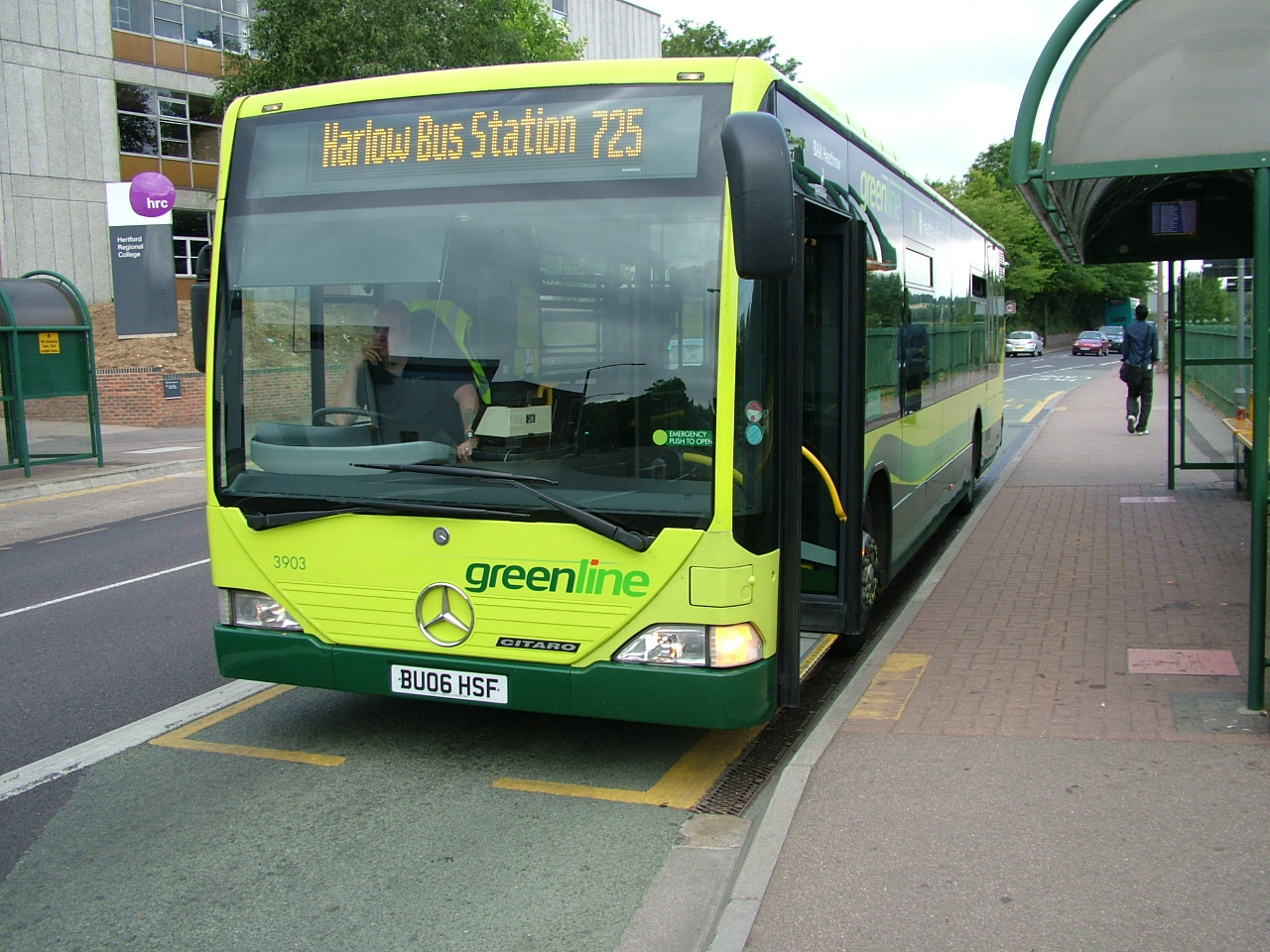
Mercedes-Benz Citaro bus on Green Line route 725 in Ware in July 2010

Ware garage replaced the Hertford depot in 1993. It runs part of route 724 along with Harlow garage. Operation of London bus route 327 was transferred from Ware to Arriva London's Enfield garage on 3 January 2009. Ware did briefly become an Arriva The Shires garage in late 2010, before transferring back to Arriva East Herts & Essex. On 4 September 2010 routes 250 and 251 transferred from Harlow to Ware.

== Arriva The Shires ==
Arriva The Shires Limited is based in Luton and operates bus garages in Luton, Milton Keynes, Watford, Stevenage, and Hemel Hempstead.

Arriva The Shires evolved from the purchase of the Luton, Aylesbury and Hitchin depots of United Counties by Luton & District Transport (LDT) in a management buy-out in 1987. Depots at Watford, High Wycombe, Hemel Hempstead, Amersham and Slough were acquired with London Country North West in 1990, although Amersham has since closed and Slough was later sold to Bee Line. LDT was bought in 1994 by British Bus, itself bought in 1996 by The Cowie Group. LDT's was renamed Arriva The Shires in April 1998.

=== Hemel Hempstead ===
Hemel Hempstead was a depot of London Country Bus Services (North West) (one of the companies into which London Country Bus Services was divided in 1986), acquired by Luton & District Transport in 1988.

The Hemel Hempstead depot runs a small number of local routes in the town as well as the 300/302 to St Albans and Welwyn Garden City, 320 to Rickmansworth, 500 to Aylesbury and 508 to Watford. In 2016, this depot took over operation of Watford local services 8 and 10.

=== Luton ===
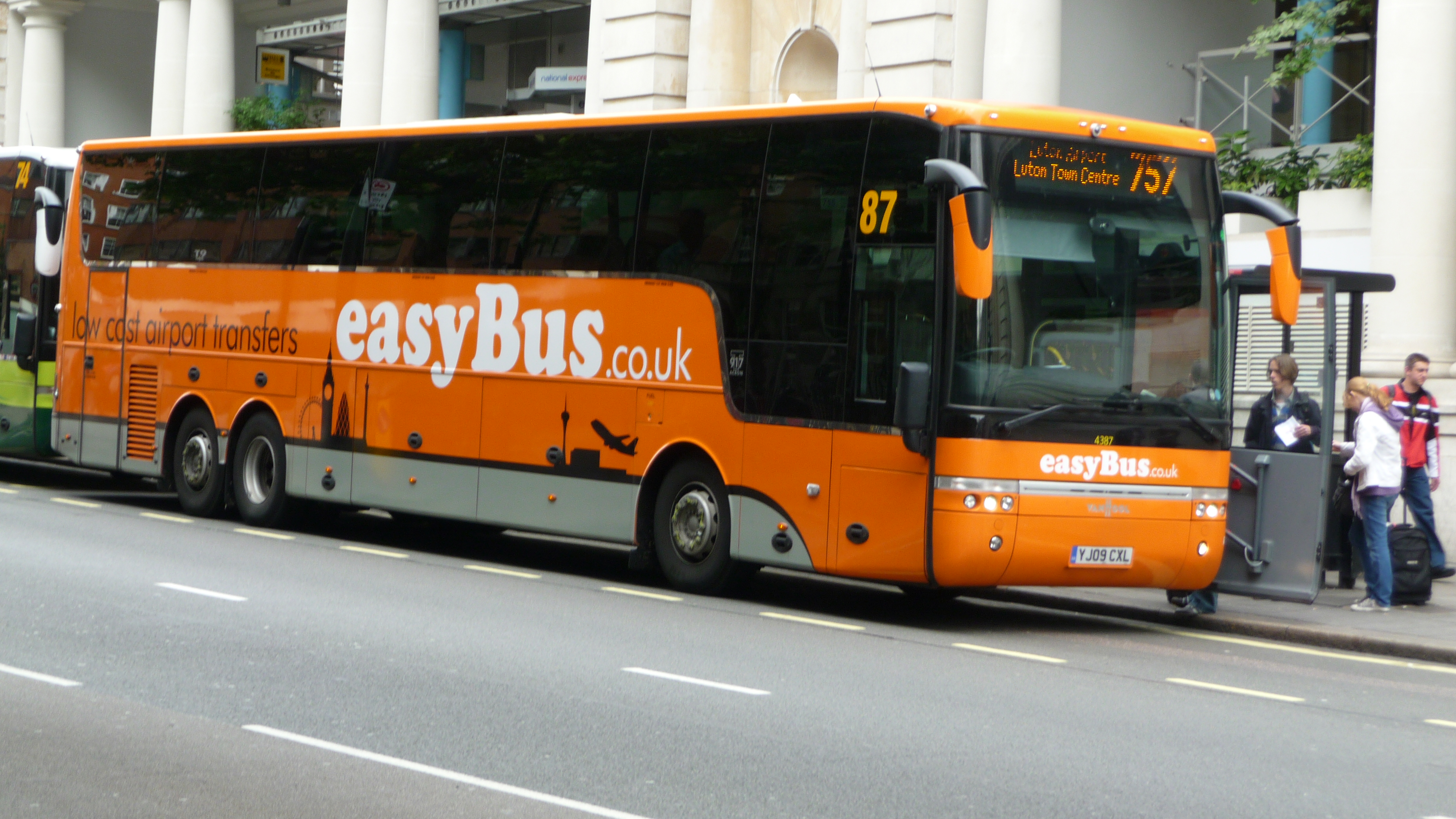
Van Hool bodied DAF on Green Line route 757 at London Victoria in June 2009

Luton depot is purpose-built and is at 487 Dunstable Road. It replaced the previous depot at Castle Street. It also houses the Head Office for Arriva The Shires & Essex as well as the UK bus team.

The majority of the Luton depot's routes are within the Luton and Dunstable boundary, including four on the Luton-Dunstable Busway. Busway routes F70 and F77 reach out as far as Milton Keynes and the 321 operates to Watford, the latter being taken over from Garston (Watford) in 2016.

Luton operates Green Line Coaches routes 755 and 757 and previously had an outstation at Stansted Airport which operated the EB2 an easyBus contract. It also operated Green Line 748, 758, 759 and 768 between late 2019 and their withdrawal in December 2021.

=== Hitchin/Stevenage ===
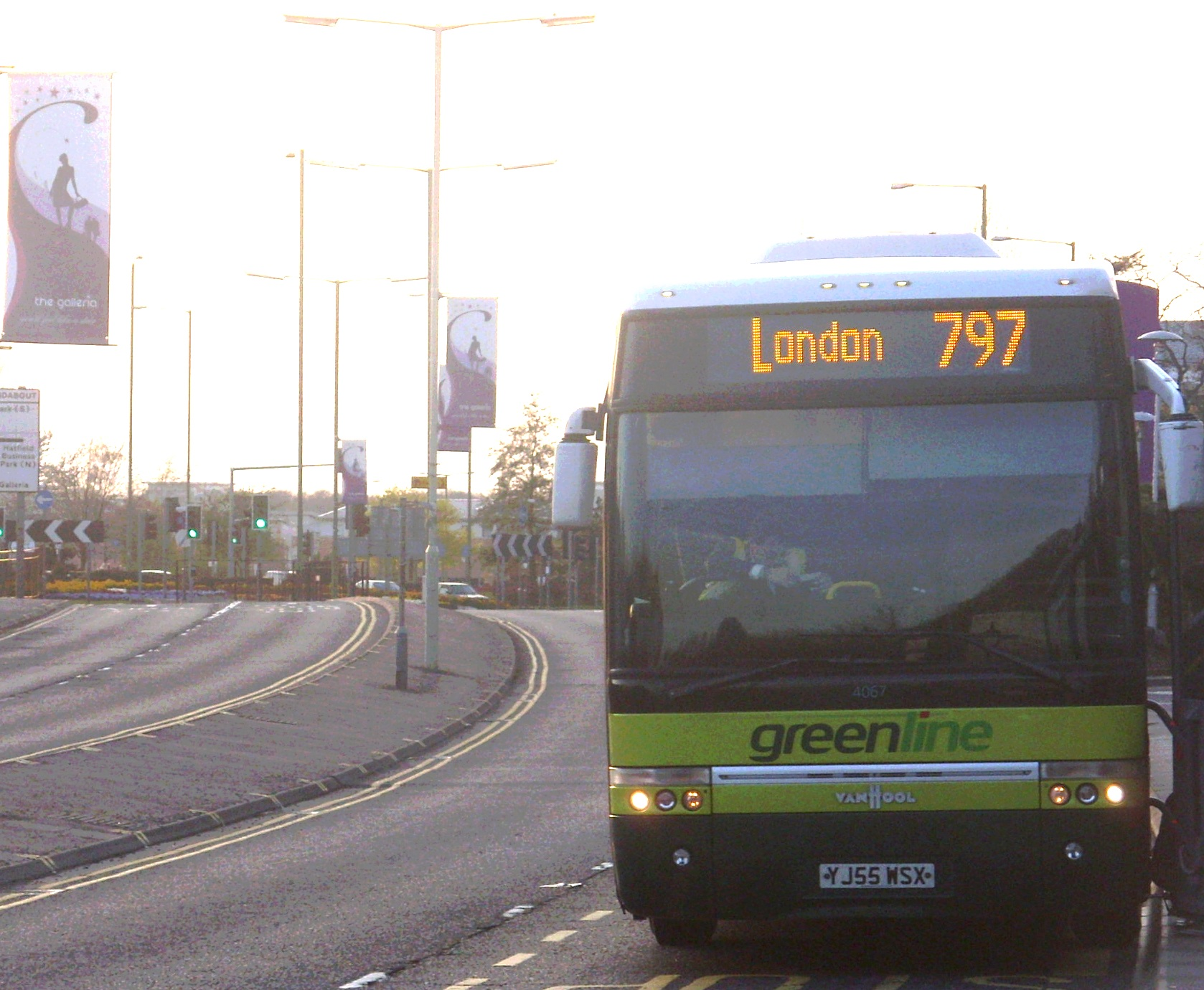
Arriva the Shires Van Hool bodied DAF coach on 797 route in Hatfield in April 2010

The Hitchin depot was a depot of United Counties acquired by LDT in 1987.

Hitchin services have been worked from Stevenage garage since January 2007 following the closure of the old former United Counties garage in Fishponds Road. Services around the Hitchin area have been reduced, and many are operated by other contractors including Centrebus.

When London Country Bus Services was broken up in 1986, the Stevenage depot passed to London Country North East, sold in 1988 to AJS Group who established the Sovereign brand. Most of the operation was sold in 1990 to Luton & District Transport, and therefore became part of Arriva in 1996. In 1996 Arriva took over several vehicles and routes from Sovereign, by then owned by the Blazefield Group, in exchange for the London Green Line route 797. In 2004 Arriva acquired the last remaining Sovereign operation. Blazefield had already sold its London operations to Transdev London and its St Albans depot and routes to Centrebus.

Arriva currently have two depots in the town; Babbage Road (ex Sovereign) and Bessemer Road. The site at Norton Green closed during August 2021 for redevelopment, with vehicles temporarily moving to a new site at Bessemer Road. Eventually all buses operating from Stevenage will be based at an expanded Babbage Road site.

As well as operating a number of local services, the Stevenage depot also runs to Letchworth on route 55, Luton on the 100/101, St Albans on route 301 and the 97/98 between Hitchin and Stotfold/Baldock.

=== Milton Keynes ===
In February 2006, Arriva bought the operations of MK Metro for £5.6 million, and operational control transferred to The Shires & Essex. The purchase was subsequently considered by the Office of Fair Trading for possible referral to the Competition Commission, but it decided not to. Vehicles and publicity for the Milton Keynes operation continued to use the MK Metro name until April 2010, when they were rebranded as Arriva Milton Keynes, temporarily using the brand name MK Star. The change of name coincided with a number of controversial service changes. Many services were improved in frequency as part of the rebranding but others were reduced or withdrawn and some journey times were increased.

There are various local services operated. In 2021, the depot was awarded the contract to operate routes 33/33A to Northampton and also have responsibility for routes X4 (previously the 150) and X6 (previously the X60) to Aylesbury. The depot is in Wolverton, with a storage site located nearby in Arden Park. Withdrawn vehicles tend to be sent there for decommissioning before being disposed of.

=== Waltham Abbey ===
Arriva The Shires previously operated 2 routes in the Waltham Abbey area:

- 251, Upshire to Hammond Street
- 250, Debden Broadway to Waltham Cross

Route 250 remained in competition with route 255 operated by Harlow-based Roadrunner buses. Earlier in 2013 Arriva withdrew route 250 service to provide a stronger service on the 251 and to expand onto the 310 route from Waltham Cross to Ware. Many of the buses used on the 250 service can now be seen on the 251 service operating from Upshire to Hammond Street more frequently.

=== Watford ===
Arriva operates various bus routes in Watford, such as: 20, 320, 321, 322, 724 and 725. They provide connections to Hemel Hempstead, London Heathrow Airport, Luton, St Albans, Stevenage and Harlow. Arriva also used to operate London bus services under Arriva the Shires but those routes were later sold to RATP Group and Metroline.

On 31 December 2024, Arriva withdrew their ArrivaClick services in Watford. arriva have also withdrawn services 9, 10, 328, 335 and 336.

== Former garages ==
=== Aylesbury ===
Aylesbury depot was a depot of United Counties acquired by LDT in 1987. Later in 1987 LDT also acquired the long-established Aylesbury independent company, Red Rover.

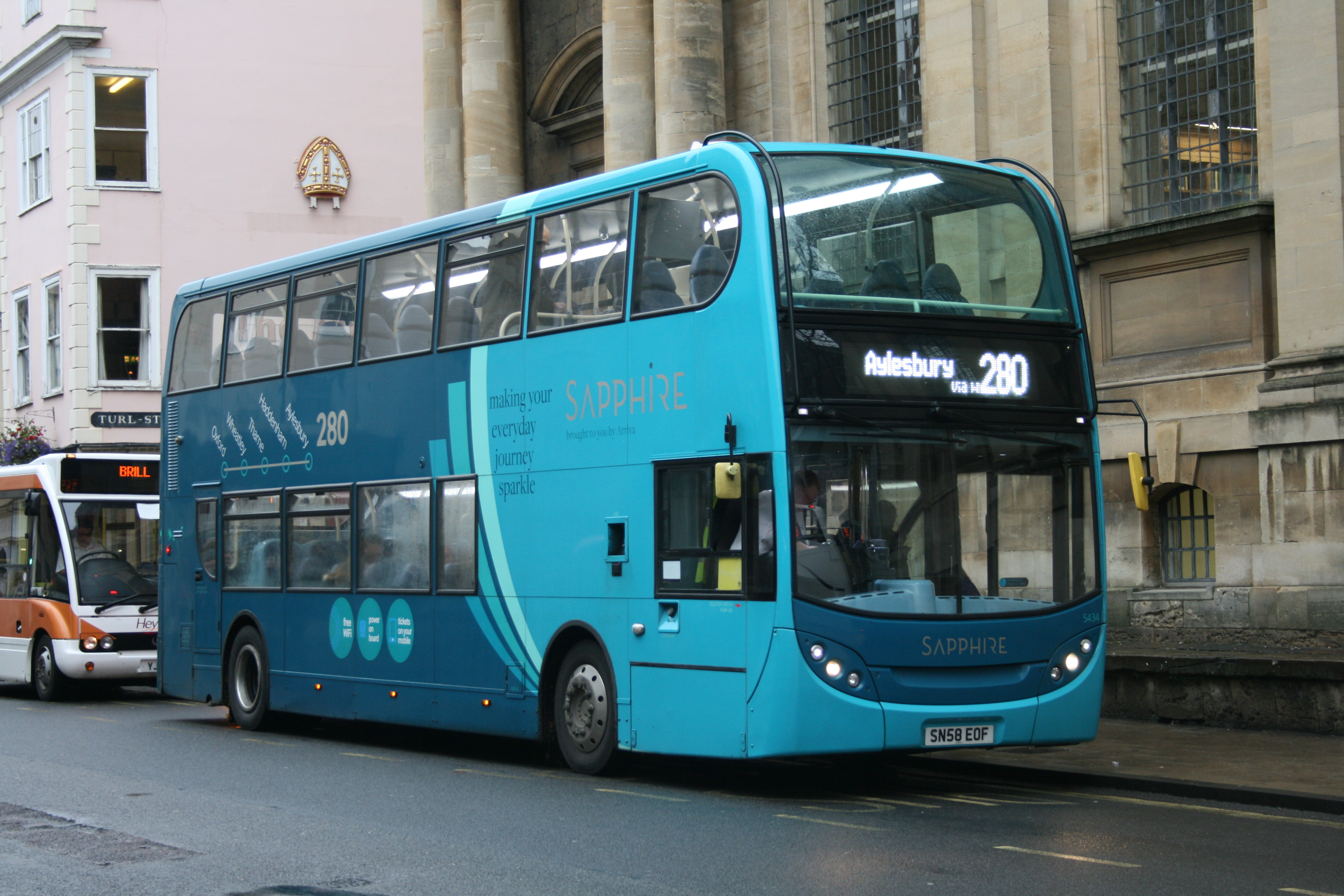
An Enviro400 in Oxford city centre on Route 280 in October 2014

The Aylesbury depot predominantly operated long distance services, such as the X9/X90 (previously 300/X30) to High Wycombe, X5 (previously 500) to Hemel Hempstead and X7 (previously 280)/X8 to Oxford. They previously ran town routes 2, 4, 8 and 9 plus country routes 16, 50, 55, 60/60A, 61 and 110, and inter urban routes 150 (now X4) and X60 (now X6) in the town, as well as the 18 between Buckingham and Bicester but all have passed onto other operators (with exception to 150 (Now X4) and X60 (Now X6) which are still with Arriva but have since transferred to the Milton Keynes depot).

On 25 June 2024, Arriva announced that Aylesbury depot would close on 27 July 2024, with other operators set to take over services from this depot.

=== High Wycombe ===
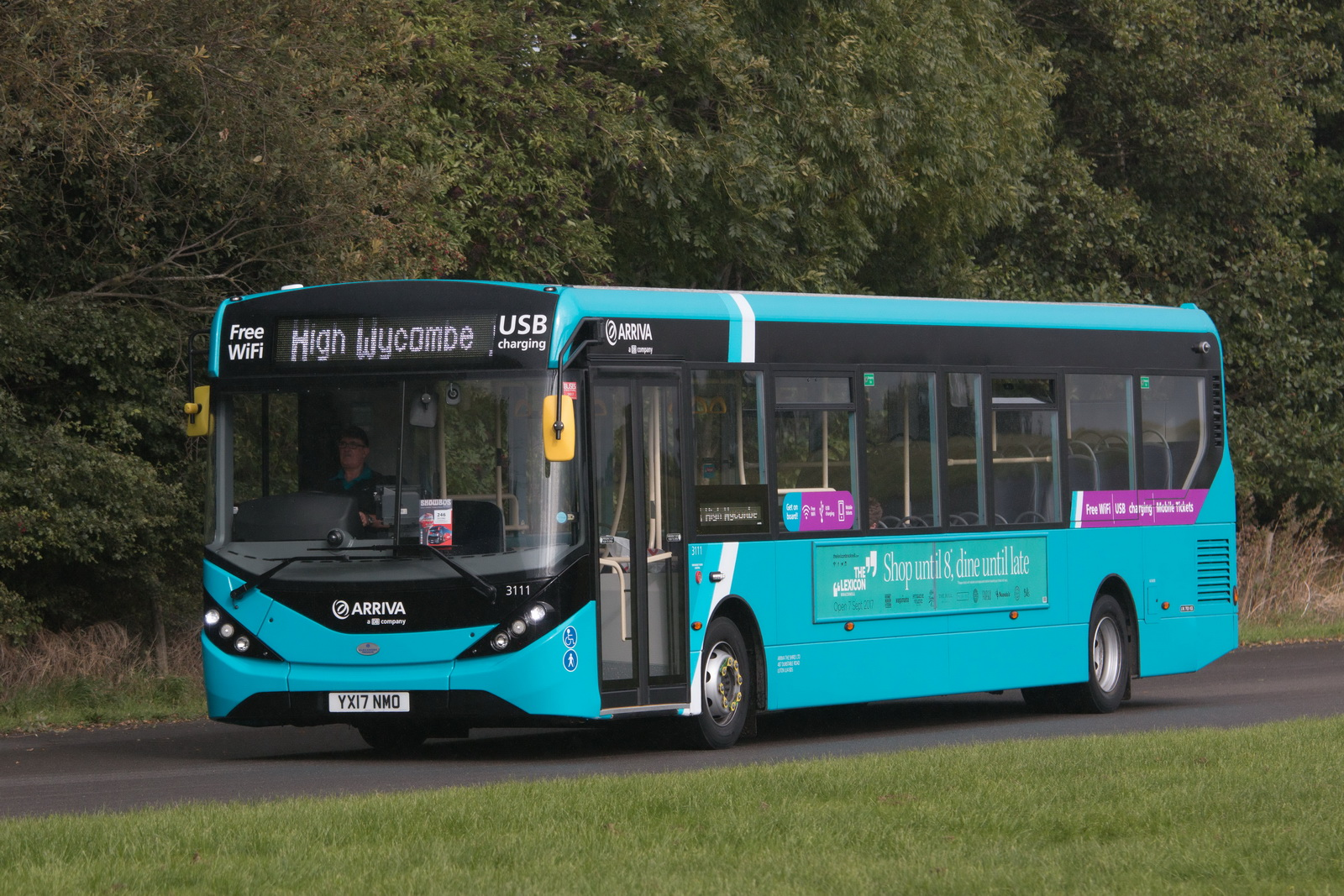
Enviro200 MMC in September 2017

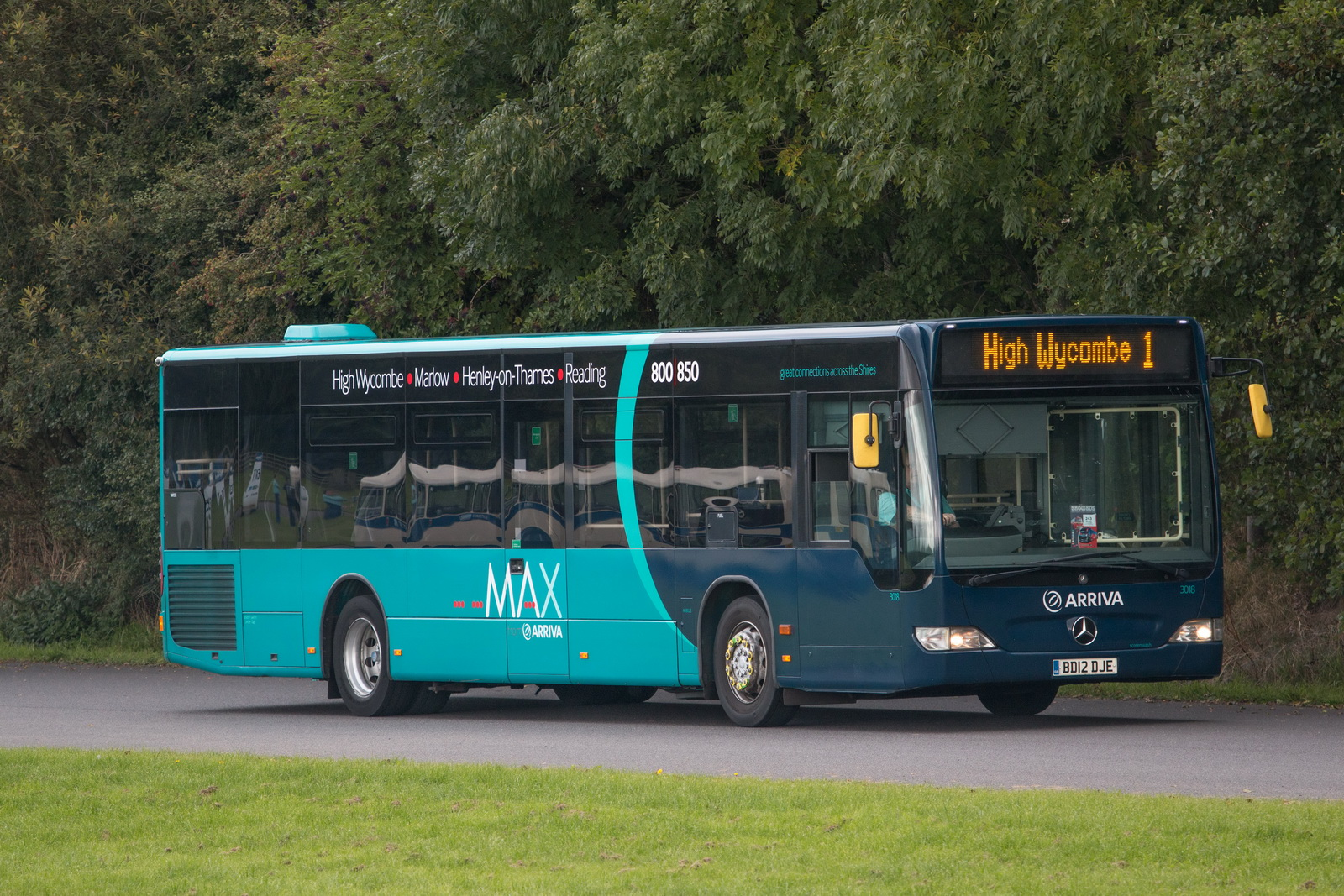
Mercedes-Benz Citaro in High Wycombe in September 2017

High Wycombe was another depot of London Country Bus Services (North West), acquired by LDT in 1988.

In 2000 Arriva also bought the High Wycombe depot of the Go-Ahead Group's Oxford Bus Company (which had bought it from the Bee Line in 1990).

In 2005 High Wycombe garage moved to a new purpose built depot following the closure of the old bus station in the town, where the previous garage was. The High Wycombe depot operated a number of services both locally and further afield, reaching Reading on the 800/850.

High Wycombe depot closed on 27 July 2024, with Carousel Buses taking over all of its services and restoring the crosstown links.

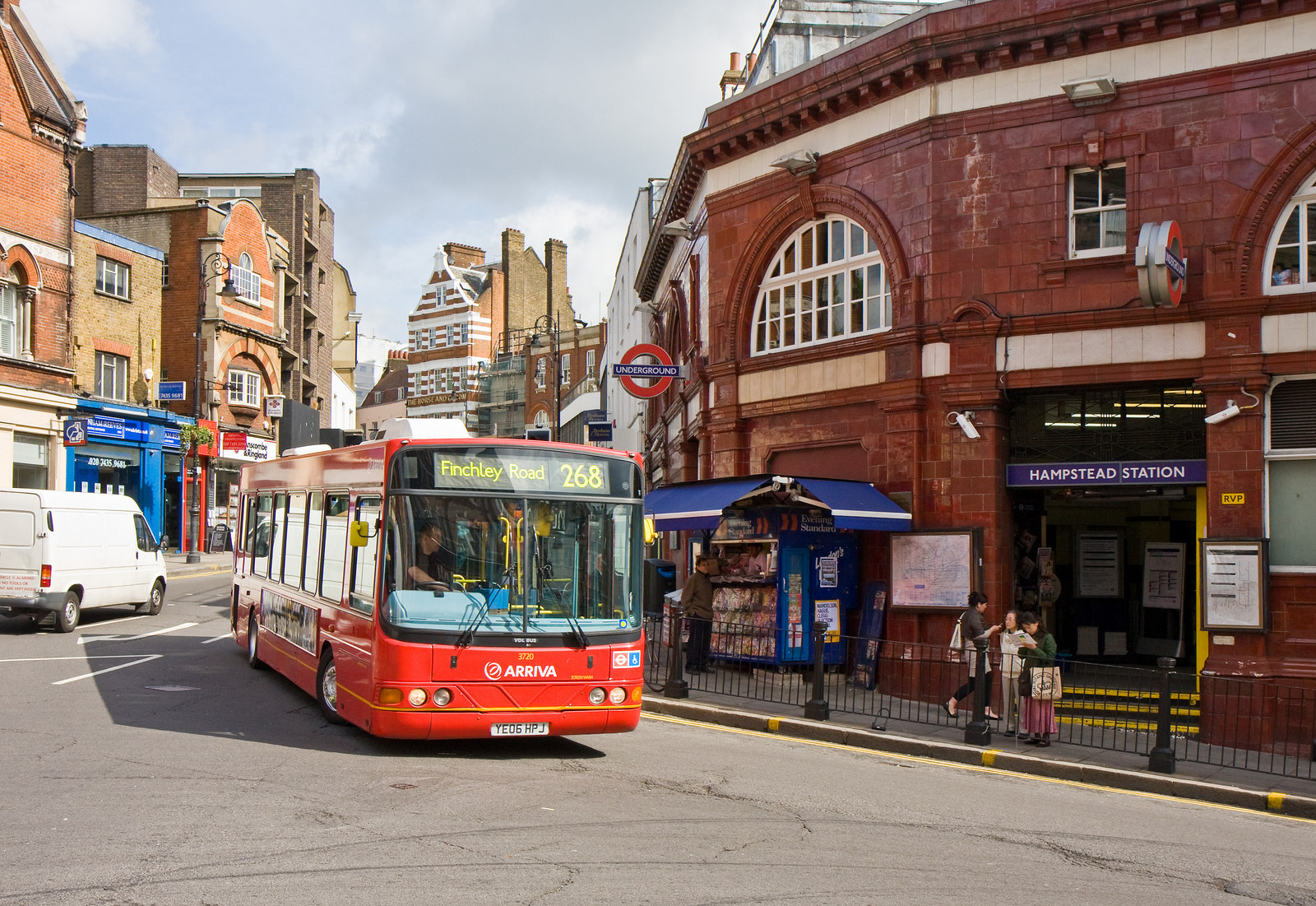
Wright Cadet bodied DAF SB120 on route 268 in Hampstead, London

=== Garston ===
As of May 2015, Watford garage operated London routes 142, 258, 268, 288, 303, 305, 340, 631, 642, H2, H3, H18 and H19. It also operated LSP route 8, and school routes. As part of a decision to consolidate all of Arriva's Transport for London routes, Watford garage was transferred to Arriva London on 1 January 2016. Due to high running costs, Watford depot closed in 2018, with the routes being transferred to Hemel Hempstead. On Sunday 8 April 2018, the Amersham & District Motorbus Society held its annual running day in honour of the depot, with the theme being 'Farewell to Garston garage'. In 2019, the site was sold to Fairview New Homes with the vision to convert it into 165 residential houses.

==== History ====
Watford was a depot of London Country Bus Services (North West) (one of the companies into which London Country Bus Services was divided in 1986), acquired by Luton & District Transport in 1990.
