= London Country North West =

Defunct English bus operator

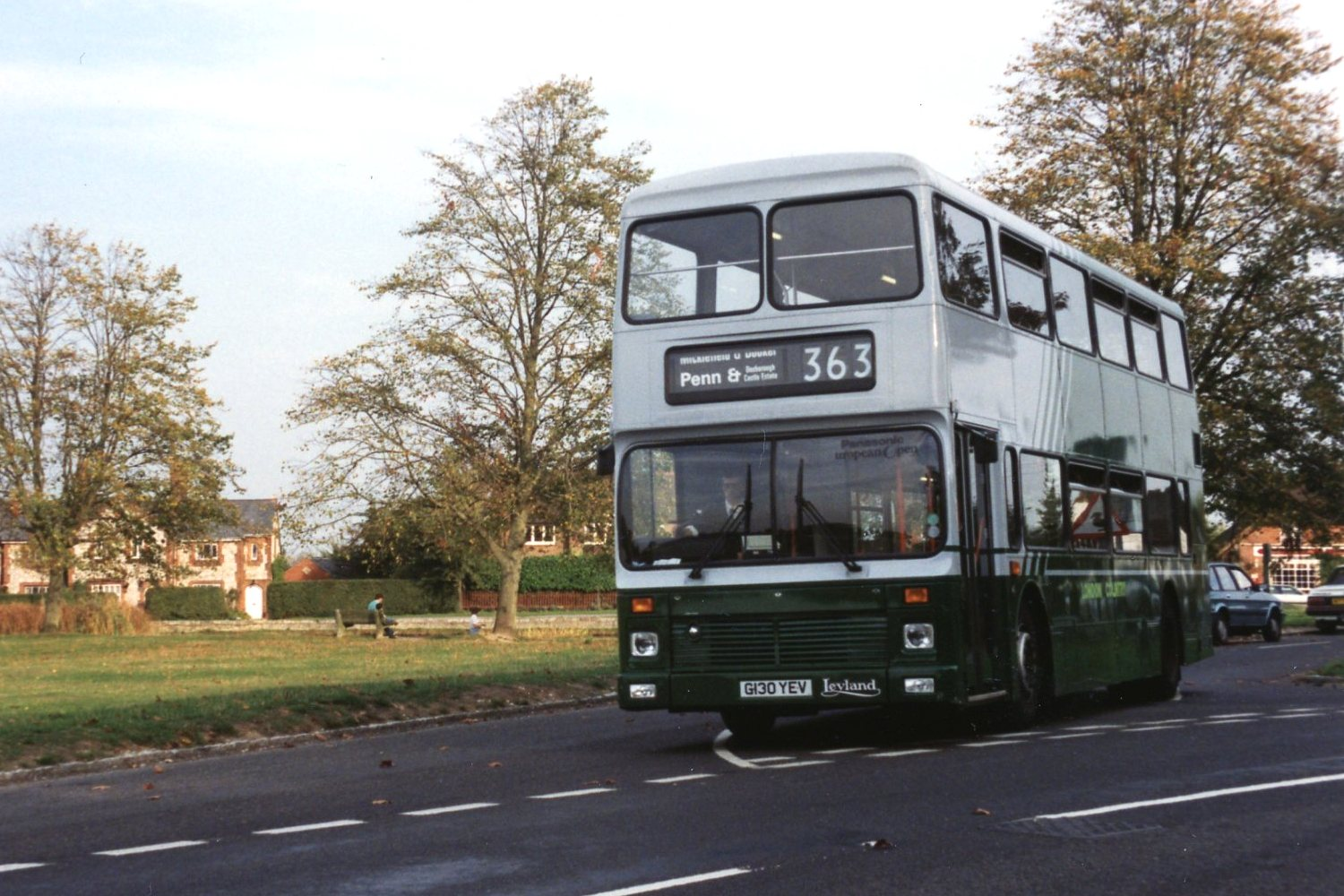
- Northern Counties Palatine bodied Leyland Olympian in Penn in October 1990
- Parent: National Bus Company (1986-88); Management (1989-90)
- Founded: 7 September 1986
- Ceased operation: 1990
- Headquarters: Garston
- Service area: Hertfordshire; Berkshire; Buckinghamshire; Greater London
- Service type: Bus operator
- Depots: 5
- Fleet: 360

London Country North West was a bus operator in South East England and London. It was formed from the split of London Country Bus Services in 1986, and operated a fleet of around 360 buses from five garages, with its headquarters located in Garston.

== History ==
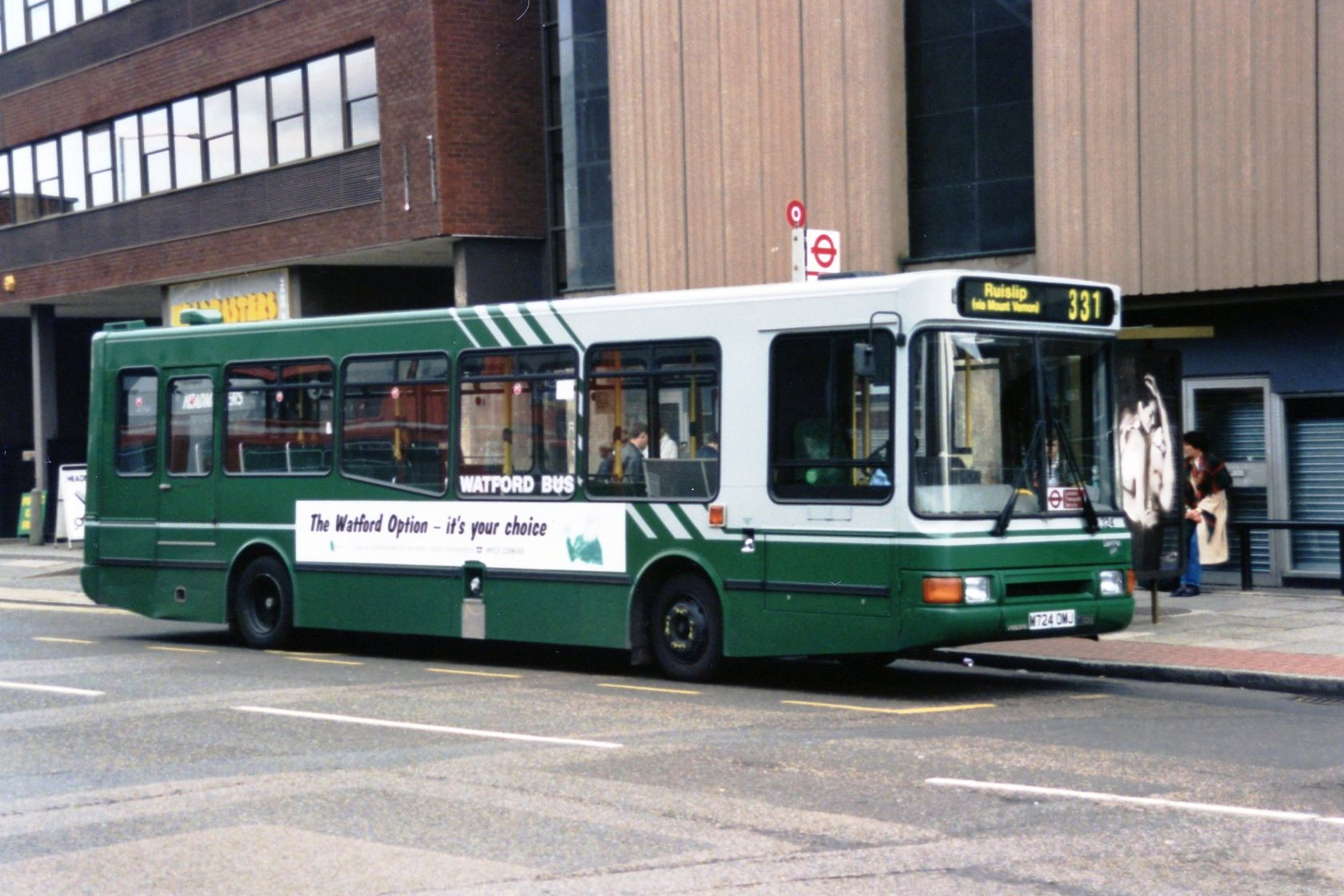
Luton & District Northern Counties Paladin bodied Volvo B6 with Watford Bus branding in April 1995

In the run-up to deregulation, London Country Bus Services was broken into four smaller companies on 7 September 1986.

London Country North West took over 360 buses and garages in Garston, Hemel Hempstead, High Wycombe, Amersham and Slough.

On 5 January 1988, LCNW became the first of the four new companies to be privatised when sold in a management buyout.

In 1989 a new livery of green and grey was introduced. The two years between 1988 and 1990 proved difficult for the company: in May 1988 it was found guilty by the area Traffic Commissioner of having failed to operate local bus services in accordance with registrations, and banned from registering any new routes for three months.

in February 1990 the duration of its operating licence was cut following an inspection in which half of the vehicles examined were found not to be roadworthy. Some new buses, including a number of Leyland Olympians and Dennis Darts, were purchased to help overcome these problems.

== Takeover and subsequent history ==
In October 1990 the company was acquired by neighbouring operator Luton & District. In 1993, the Slough depot was sold to BeeLine (Berks Bucks Bus Co, part of the former Alder Valley operation) in 1993. Luton & District was taken over by British Bus in 1994. Under Luton & District and later British Bus ownership, the former London Country North West garages and vehicles took on various geographical names:

- Garston: Watfordwide (1990-93); Watford Bus (1993-95); Network Watford (1995-97)
- Hemel Hempstead: Hemel Bus (1990-95); Gade Valley (1995-97)
- High Wycombe & Amersham: Chiltern Bus (1990-95); Chiltern Rover (1995-97)

The previous LCNW livery was retained, and the original Luton & District livery adapted to match its design, until 1995, when the whole company was rebranded as The Shires. On 1 August 1996, British Bus became part of the Cowie Group in a deal which brought three of the four segments of the original London Country Bus Services under common ownership. In November 1997, the Cowie Group was rebranded as Arriva and the former Luton & District operations are now part of Arriva Shires & Essex.
