= List of bus garages in London =

Every garage operating services that form part of the London bus network has a one or two letter garage code. Such codes are not only for garages operating Transport for London contracts, but also to those operating commercial bus services under London bus agreements. There is also a code for Tramlink. The codes are used internally by London Buses, for administrative purposes.

== History ==
Many of the codes are long-established, going back to London Buses Limited (LBL) (and in many cases earlier) days, and are well known among staff and enthusiasts. There is usually some sort of logic to the code allocated. In the early part of the 20th century, the London General Omnibus Company allocated its garages codes by going through the alphabet — initially A, B, C, etc.; and then AA, AB, AC, etc. Codes allocated since often reflect the geographical name of the garage (e.g. Fulwell, Alperton), New Cross (NX).) although some have since been renamed (HT, Holloway, was called Highgate).

Since the start of tendering in 1985, some codes have also reflected the name of the owning company, examples being AH (Armchair, Brentford), EL (Eastern National, Chelmsford), WI (Wings, Uxbridge), BE (Blue Triangle, Rainham). Such company names may not still be in use today: DX (Arriva London North East, Barking) originates from Dix Travel, which was absorbed into Grey-Green, becoming its Dagenham operation, and subsequently relocated to Barking, and now absorbed by Arriva London. Similarly BT (Sovereign, Edgware) comes from BTS, which was subsequently bought out by Sovereign, and Hounslow Heath code WK originates from Westlink. The official code FR for Metrobus's Crayford base is especially obscure, referring to the original owner, one Chris Freeman of Freeman's Coaches, which was absorbed into Crystals, which subsequently sold out to Tellings-Golden Miller in 2003, who then sold it on to Metrobus in 2005.

In several cases (TB/TC/TL and QB) the code reflects both the location (Bromley/Croydon/Lewisham (Catford), Battersea) and the original owning company (Tilling, Q-Drive). For example TB is Tilling Bromley, QB is Q-Drive Battersea.

Some garage codes have been used for more than one garage over the years, sometimes when an entire garage has moved such as at Peckham (PM), and sometimes when a code has been dormant for some years and then been reused. Some premises have had different codes at different times in their life. Three garages (Ash Grove, Edgware and Fulwell) have two codes, one for each operator.

During the period of operation by London Transport and its predecessors, indeed back to the earliest motor buses in the early 20th century, the garage code was clearly carried on both sides of the vehicle. The code was usually in the form of a metal (later plastic) stencil plate carried in a holder beside the running duty number plate. Latterly, the garage codes took the form of painted stencils or adhesive characters. In the post London Transport/ London Buses period, the display of garage codes is no longer universal and many vehicles carry no visible identification.

There are a number of historical anomalies with the allocation of codes. When Ash Grove garage opened in 1981, it was coded AG by London Transport. As an operational garage that has opened and closed several times over the years, it now carries the code HK, formerly the code of the long closed Hendon garage and the AG code is currently unused.

== Current codes ==
=== A ===
Code	Garage	Operator	London Buses Code	Opened	Closed	Picture	Reference
A	Sutton	London General	A	1924			
AC	Willesden	Metroline	AC	1912			
AD	Palmers Green	Arriva London	AD	1912			
AE	Ash Grove	Kentish Bus (1994-98) East Thames Buses (2000-05) HCT Group (2001-2022) Arriva London (2005-2024) East London (from 2022)	AE	1981			
AF	Putney	London General	AF	1888 (horse-drawn omnibus) 1912 (motorbus)			
AH	Brentford	Armchair (1999-2006) Metroline (from 2006)	AH	1999			
AL	Merton	London General	AL	1913			
AR	Tottenham	Arriva London	AR	1913		A picture of the entrance to Tottenham bus garage	
AV	Hounslow	London United	AV	1913			
AW	Walthamstow Avenue	East London	AW	2016			

=== B ===
Code	Garage	Operator	London Buses Code	Opened	Closed	Picture	Reference
BC	Beddington	Transport UK London Bus	BC	1999			
BK	Barking	East London	BK	1924			
BN	Brixton	Arriva London	BN	1892 (cable trams) 1906 (trams) 1951 (buses)			
BT	Edgware	London Sovereign	BT	1925			
BW	Bow	East London	BW	1908 (trams) 1939 (trolley buses) 1959 (buses)			
BX	Bexleyheath	London Central	BX	1935			

=== C ===
Code	Garage	Operator	London Buses Code	Opened	Closed	Picture	Reference
C	Croydon	London General	C	2005			
CP	Parr Road	London Sovereign	BT	2018			
CT	Clapton	Arriva London	CT				

=== D ===
Code	Garage	Operator	London Buses Code	Opened	Closed	Picture	Reference
DT	Dartford	Arriva London	DT	1933 (original) 19 January 1986	18 January 1986 (original)		
DS	Henley Road	Blue Triangle	DS	2021			
DX	Barking	Grey-Green (1991-98) Arriva London (from 1998)	DX	1991			

=== E ===
Code	Garage	Operator	London Buses Code	Opened	Closed	Picture	Reference
E	Enfield	Arriva London	E	1927			
EC	Edmonton	Arriva London	EC	1997			
EW	Edgware	Metroline	EW	1925			

=== F ===
Code	Garage	Operator	London Buses Code	Opened	Closed	Picture	Reference
FW	Fulwell	London United	FW	1904 (tram) 1931 (trolleybus) 1962 (bus)			

=== G ===
Code	Garage	Operator	London Buses Code	Opened	Closed	Picture	Reference
G	Greenford	First London (1997-2013) Ealing Community Transport (2003-09) Metroline (from 2013)	G	1993			
GM	Goat Road	London General	GM	2023			
GW	Armstrong Way	Transport UK London Bus	GW	2019			
GY	Grays	Arriva London		1935 (original) 1993	1993 (original)		

=== H ===
Code	Garage	Operator	London Buses Code	Opened	Closed	Picture	Reference
HD	Harrow Weald	Metroline	HD	1930			
HK	Ash Grove	East London	HK	1981			
HT	Holloway	Metroline	HT	1907 (trams) 1938 (trolleybuses) 1961 (buses)			
HZ	Hayes	Metroline	HZ	2005	2017		

=== K ===
Code	Garage	Operator	London Buses Code	Opened	Closed	Picture	Reference
KC	King's Cross	Metroline	KC	2010	2023		

=== L ===
Code	Garage	Operator	London Buses Code	Opened	Closed	Picture	Reference
LI	Lea Interchange	East London	HO	2007			

=== M ===
Code	Garage	Operator	London Buses Code	Opened	Closed	Picture	Reference
MB	Orpington	London General	MB				
MG	Morden Wharf	London Central	MG	2017			

=== N ===
Code	Garage	Operator	London Buses Code	Opened	Closed	Picture	Reference
N	Norwood	Arriva London	N	1909			
NP	Northumberland Park	Capital Citybus (1991-7) First London (1997-2012) London General (from 2012)	NP	1991			
NS	Romford	East London	NS	1953			
NX	New Cross	London Central	NX	1906 (trams) 1962 (buses)			

=== P ===
Code	Garage	Operator	London Buses Code	Opened	Closed	Picture	Reference
PA	Perivale West	Metroline	PA		2022		
PB	Potters Bar	Metroline	PB	1930			
PD	Plumstead	Selkent	PD	1981			
PT	Purfleet	EnsignBus					
PL	Waterside Way	London General	PL	2003	2023		
PM	Peckham	London Central	PM	1905			
PV	Perivale	Metroline	PV				

=== Q ===
Code	Garage	Operator	London Buses Code	Opened	Closed	Picture	Reference
Q	Camberwell	London Central		1919			
QB	Battersea	Transport UK London Bus		1990s			

=== R ===
Code	Garage	Operator	London Buses Code	Opened	Closed	Picture	Reference
RA	Waterloo	London General	RA	1951			
RM	Rainham	Thameside	RM	2007			
RP	Park Royal	London United	RP	2007			
RR	River Road	Blue Triangle	RR	2016			

=== S ===
Code	Garage	Operator	London Buses Code	Opened	Closed	Picture	Reference
S	Shepherd's Bush	London United	S	1906			
SD	Stratford	East London	SD	1992	2008		
SF	Stamford Hill	Arriva London	SF	2024			
SI	Silvertown	Docklands Buses	SI				
SM	South Mimms	Sullivan Buses	SN	1998			
SO	Harrow	London Sovereign	SO	1994			
SW	Stockwell	London General	SW	1952			

=== T ===
Code	Garage	Operator	London Buses Code	Opened	Closed	Picture	Reference
T	Leyton	East London	T	1912			
TB	Bromley	Selkent	TB	1924			
TC	Croydon	Arriva London	TC	1916			
TF	Twickenham	Transport UK London Bus	TF	1904 (tram) 1931 (trolleybus) 1962 (bus)			
TH	Thornton Heath	Arriva London	TH	1879 (horse tramway) 1901 (tram) 1951 (bus)			
TK	Tramlink	Tramlink	TK	2000			
TL	Catford	Selkent	TL	1914			
TP	Thorpe Park	Sullivan Buses	TP				
TV	Tolworth	London United	TV	1990s			

=== U ===
Code	Garage	Operator	London Buses Code	Opened	Closed	Picture	Reference
UX	Uxbridge	Metroline	UX	1929 (original) 1983	1983 (original)		

=== V ===
Code	Garage	Operator	London Buses Code	Opened	Closed	Picture	Reference
V	Stamford Brook	London United	V	1980			

=== W ===
Code	Garage	Operator	London Buses Code	Opened	Closed	Picture	Reference
CW	Cricklewood	Metroline	W				
WD	Wandsworth	The Original Tour	WD	1902 (tram) 1937 (trolleybus) 1950 (bus)			
WH	West Ham	East London	WH	2009			
WJ	Willesden Junction	Metroline	WJ				
WK	Hounslow Heath	London United	WK				
WL	Walworth	Transport UK London Bus	WL	1905 (tram) 1951 (bus)			
WN	Wood Green	Arriva London	WN	1900s (tram) 1930s (trolleybus) 1960 (bus)			
WS	Hayes	Abellio London	WS		2021		

=== X ===
Code	Garage	Operator	London Buses Code	Opened	Closed	Picture	Reference
X	Westbourne Park	First London (1997-2013) Tower Transit (2013-2021) London Transit (from 2021)	X	1981			

=== Country Area ===
Code	Garage	Operator	London Buses Code	Opened	Closed	Picture	Reference
BF	Byfleet	Travel Surrey (2006-9) Abellio Surrey (2009-18) Falcon Buses (from 2018)	TG				
CY	Crawley	Metrobus	MY				
GY	Grays	Arriva London		1935 (original) 1993	1993 (original)		
HF	Hatfield	Uno	UB	2003			
HH	Hemel Hempstead	Arriva Shires & Essex		1935 (original) 1995	1995 (original)		
HW	High Wycombe	Arriva Shires & Essex		1929 (original)	1977 (original)		
MB	Orpington	Metrobus	MB				
TW	Tunbridge Wells	Arriva Southern Counties	TS	1937 (original) 27 May 2018	2018 (original)		

== See also ==
- List of London bus and coach stations
