= London Buses route 13 =

London bus route

13
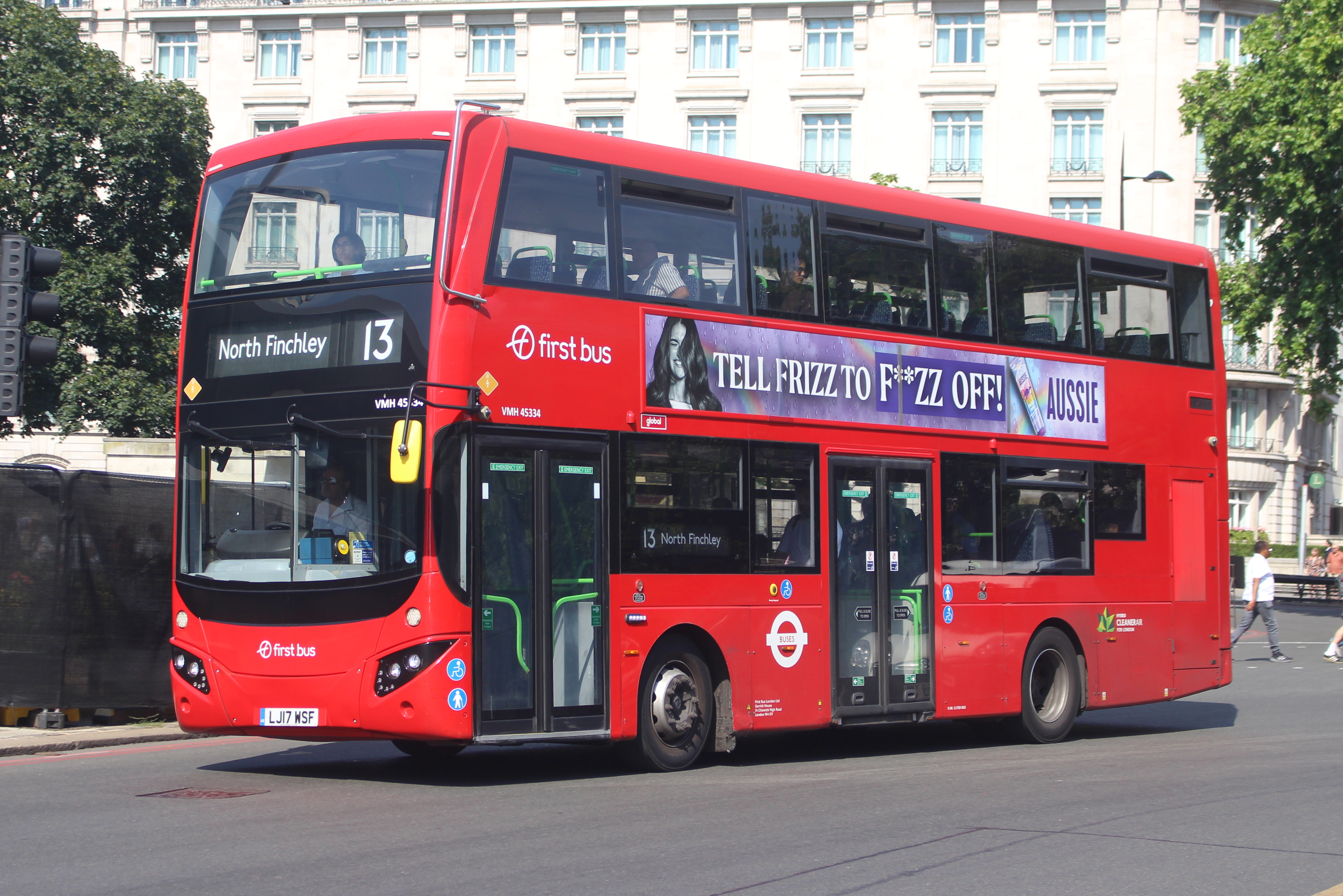
- London Transit MCV EvoSeti bodied Volvo B5LH at Marble Arch in July 2026

Overview
- Operator: London Transit (First Bus London)
- Garage: Westbourne Park
- Vehicle: Volvo B5LH MCV EvoSeti
- Peak vehicle requirement: Day: 22; Night: 4
- Former operators: RATP Dev Transit London; Tower Transit
- Night-time: 24-hour service

Route
- Start: North Finchley bus station
- Via: Finchley Central station Golders Green; Finchley Road; Swiss Cottage; St John's Wood; Baker Street; Marble Arch; Hyde Park Corner
- End: Victoria station
- Length: 10 miles (16 km)

Service
- Level: 24-hour service
- Frequency: About every 6–10 minutes
- Journey time: 45-81 minutes
- Operates: 24-hour service

London Buses route 13 is a Transport for London contracted bus route in London, England. Running between North Finchley bus station and Victoria station, it is operated by First Bus London subsidiary London Transit.

== History ==
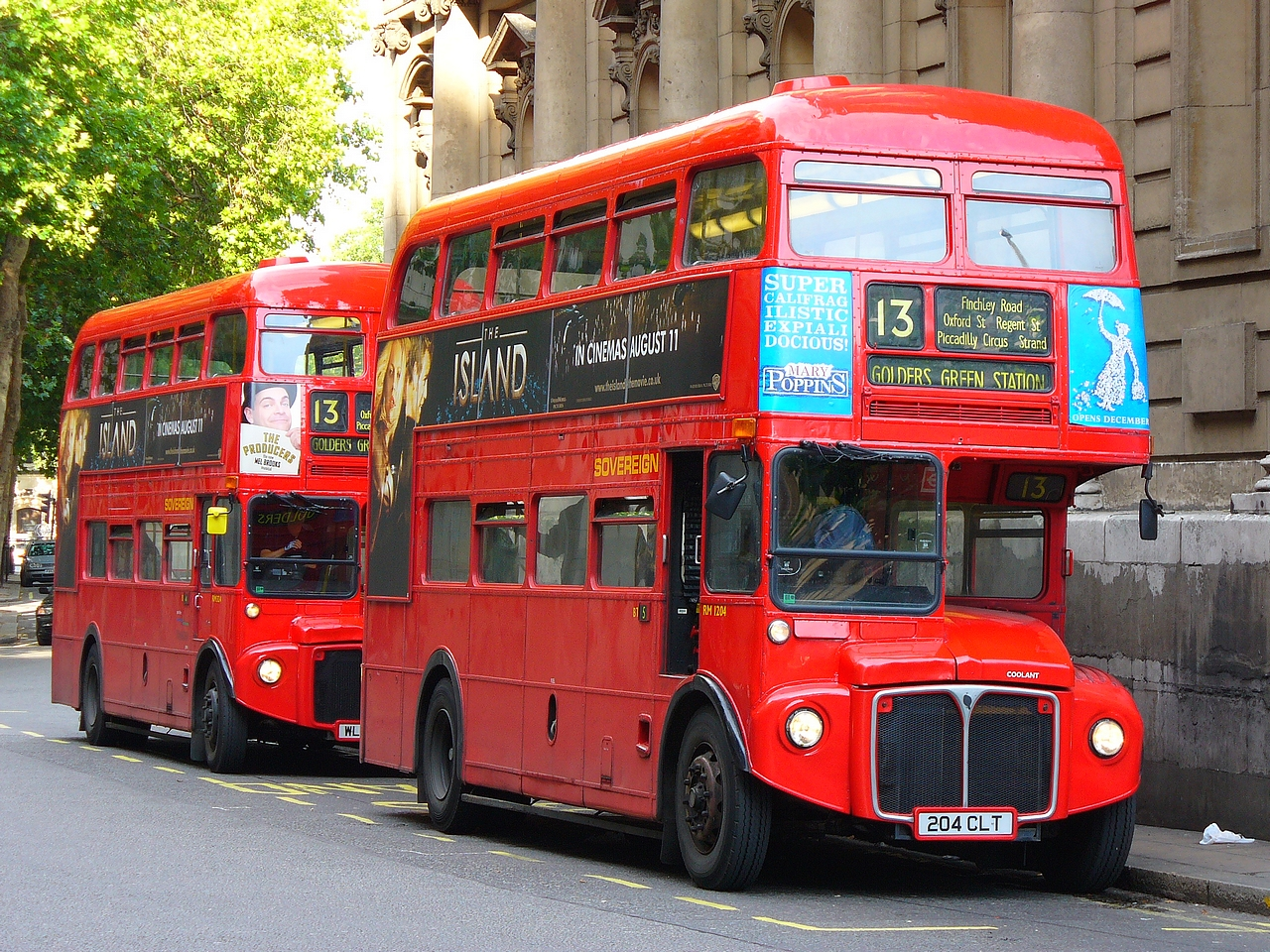
London Sovereign AEC Routemasters in Aldwych in August 2005

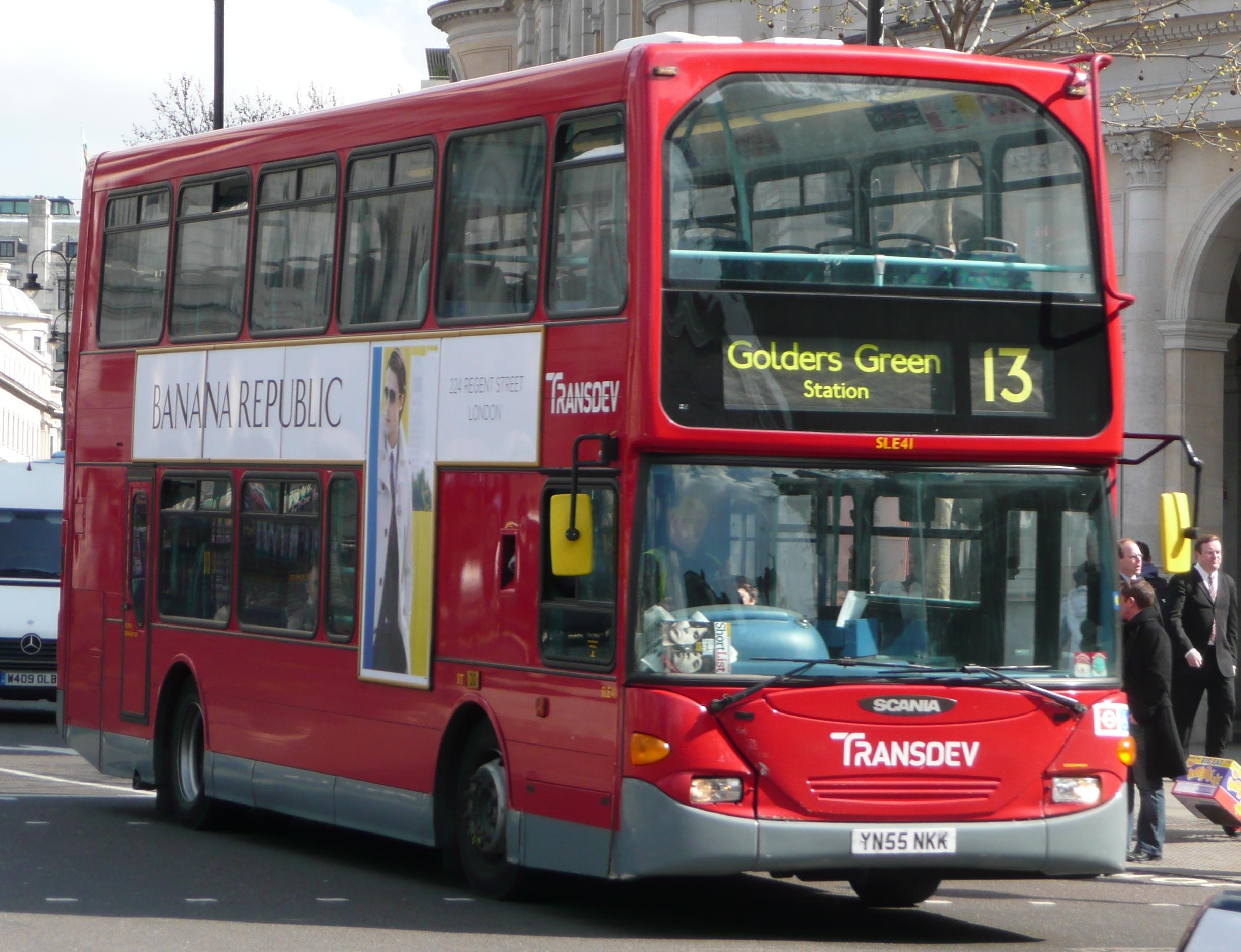
Transdev London Scania OmniDekka in April 2008

In the 1930s route 13 ran from Hendon to London Bridge with STD-type buses allocated to Hendon (AE) garage. The allocation was split between Cricklewood and Hendon garages. Hendon-Golders Green was reduced to Monday to Friday peak hours and Saturday afternoons only during World War II, then withdrawn completely by the 1950s. New AEC Routemasters were introduced to the route in 1963, by which time it was shared between Hendon and Rye Lane garages. In January 1970 the route acquired a Muswell Hill allocation and was cut back from London Bridge to Aldwych, before being extended from Golders Green to North Finchley in 1978, replacing 2B.

On 4 December 1993, independent operator BTS Coaches of Borehamwood took over the operation of route 13 after a competitive tender process. The route became one of two AEC Routemaster routes to pass to a private operator in advance of the privatisation of London Buses (the other being route 19, which passed to Kentish Bus earlier the same year). This resulted in the closure of Finchley garage, as route 13 was by then its main route. Route 13 was cut back to Golders Green. The change of operator re-introduced Sunday crew operation to the capital, as BTS did not have sufficient driver-only vehicles to cover the Sunday service. A fleet of Routemasters was leased from London Transport and painted in a poppy red livery.

Subsequently, BTS sold out to Sovereign Bus & Coach, a Hertfordshire operator and formerly part of London Country Bus Services (and later London Country North East). Although other BTS buses gained Sovereign's blue and cream livery the Routemasters remained in poppy red; route 13 was the last route in London to be operated using Routemasters in a colour other than London Transport red. The depot in Borehamwood was sold with BTS moving to the old London Transport garage at Edgware.

The route was not re-tendered until 2000 as no bids were received for the route. Sovereign was persuaded to put in a bid and when the new contract commenced on 1 September 2001 the route continued largely unchanged. The new mayor Ken Livingstone had been elected on a manifesto that included increasing the number of Routemasters in service in the capital. Route 13 was converted back to Routemaster operation on the change of tender with buses that had been rebuilt by Marshall.

However, a change of policy saw all Routemaster routes converted back to one-person operation with route converted on 22 October 2005.

When re-tendered, route 13 was retained by London Sovereign with a new contract commencing on 31 August 2013. Wright Eclipse Gemini 2 bodied Volvo B5LHs were introduced on the same date. In March 2015, Transport for London opened a public consultation on proposals to scrap the route. The route was saved after intervention by Mayor of London Boris Johnson. In September 2016, six Wright SRM bodied Volvo B5LHs entered service on the route. In July 2016, under the tenure of new Mayor of London Sadiq Khan, TfL opened another consultation on proposals to extend the route to North Finchley and divert it to Victoria station replacing route 82. This took effect on 1 April 2017 with it being operated by Tower Transit and becoming a 24-hour route.

On 28 February 2025, the route passed from RATP Dev Transit London to First Bus London following the acquisition of RATP Dev Transit London by FirstGroup.

== Current route ==
Route 13 operates via these primary locations:

- North Finchley bus station
- Finchley Central station
- Finchley Henlys Corner
- Temple Fortune
- Golders Green station
- Childs Hill Cricklewood Lane
- Finchley Road & Frognal station
- Finchley Road station
- Swiss Cottage station
- St John's Wood station
- Lord's Cricket Ground
- London Central Mosque
- Baker Street station
- Portman Square
- Marble Arch station
- Hyde Park Corner station
- Victoria station
