= Tower Transit =

Former London bus operator

Tower Transit UK
- Parent: Kelsian Group
- Founded: 22 June 2013; 13 years ago
- Headquarters: Harrington House; 25 High Street; Harrington; NN6 9NU
- Service area: Greater London, Jersey and Liverpool
- Service type: Bus operator
- Website: www.towertransit.co.uk

Tower Transit London
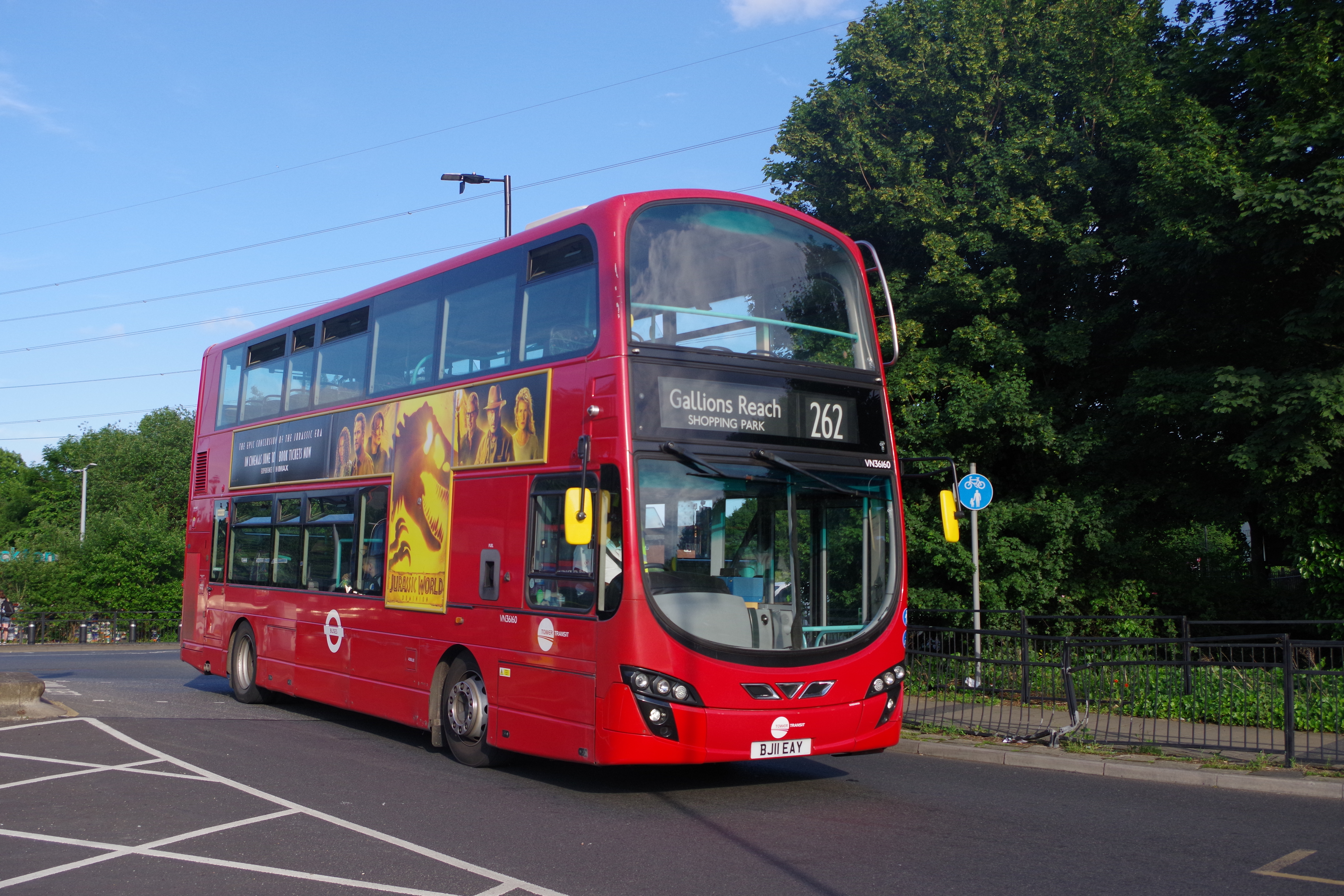
- A Tower Transit Wright Eclipse Gemini 2 bodied Volvo B9TL on route 262 in June 2022
- Parent: Kelsian Group
- Founded: 22 June 2013; 13 years ago
- Defunct: 25 June 2022; 4 years ago
- Headquarters: Lea Interchange; 151 Ruckholt Road; London; E10 5PB
- Service area: Greater London
- Service type: Bus operator
- Routes: 26 (May 2015)
- Depots: 3
- Fleet: 437 (May 2015)
- Website: www.towertransit.co.uk

Tower Transit Operations Limited, trading as Tower Transit, is a bus company in the United Kingdom and is the UK subsidiary of Australian-based Kelsian Group. The company was originally formed as a subsidiary of Transit Systems in 2013 to operate bus services in East and West London under contract to Transport for London. It no longer operates these London services since 2022, with the West London operations transferred to its joint venture RATP Dev Transit London in December 2021 and their remaining operations sold to Stagecoach London in June 2022. The company subsequently acquired bus services in the Channel Islands and Liverpool and still operates those services as of 2026.

== History ==
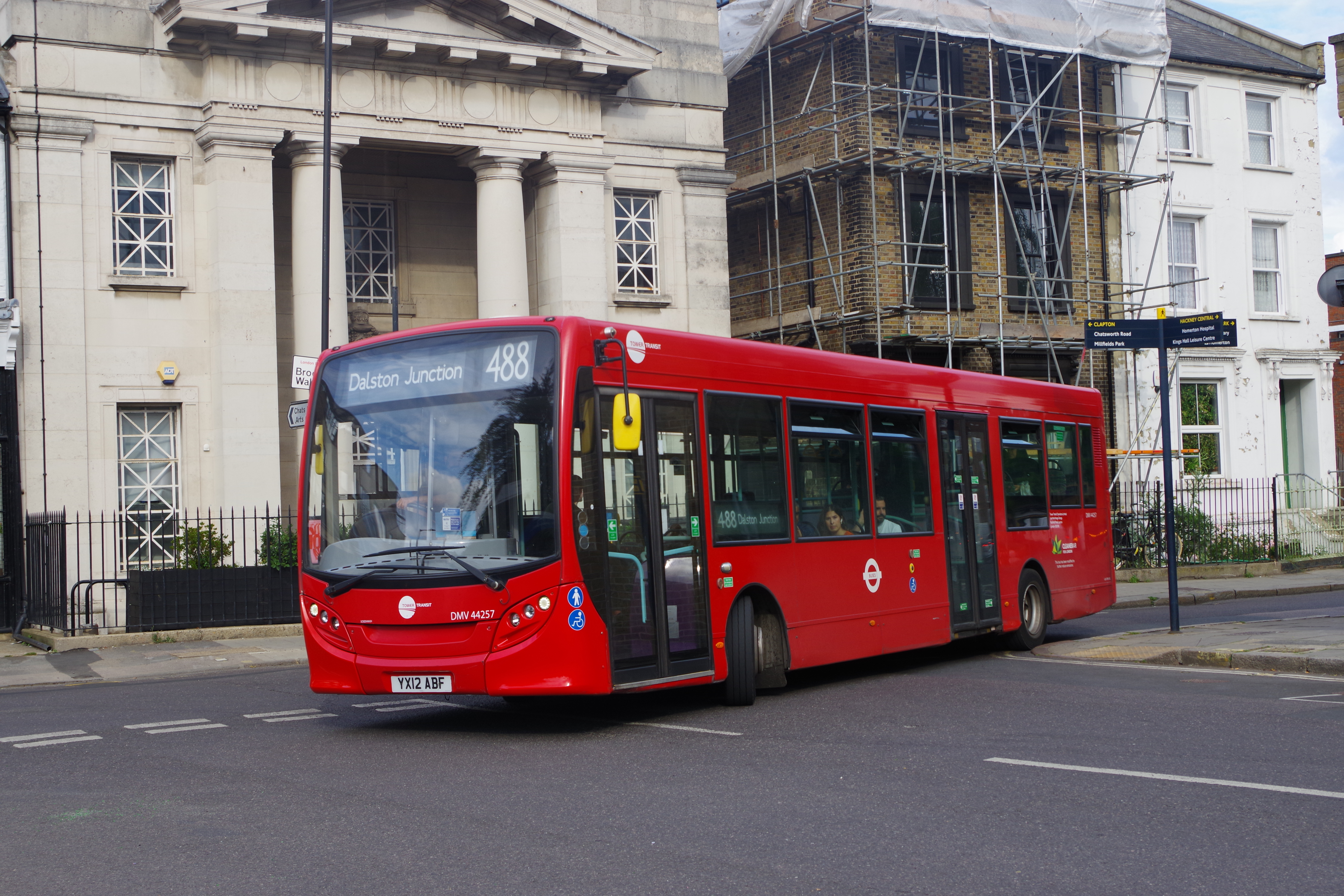
Alexander Dennis Enviro200 on route 488 in Homerton in June 2022

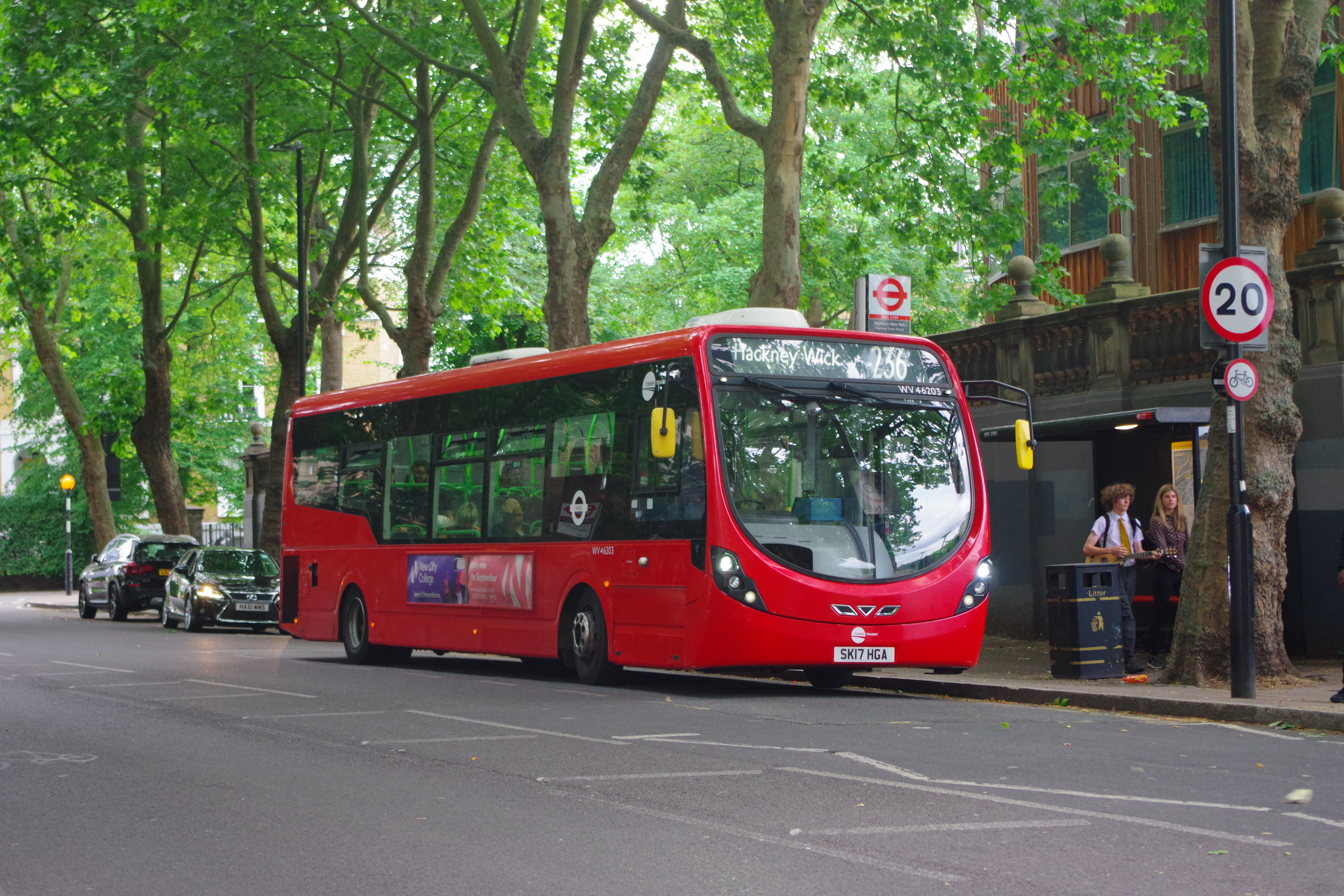
A Wright StreetLite DF on route 236 in Highbury in June 2022

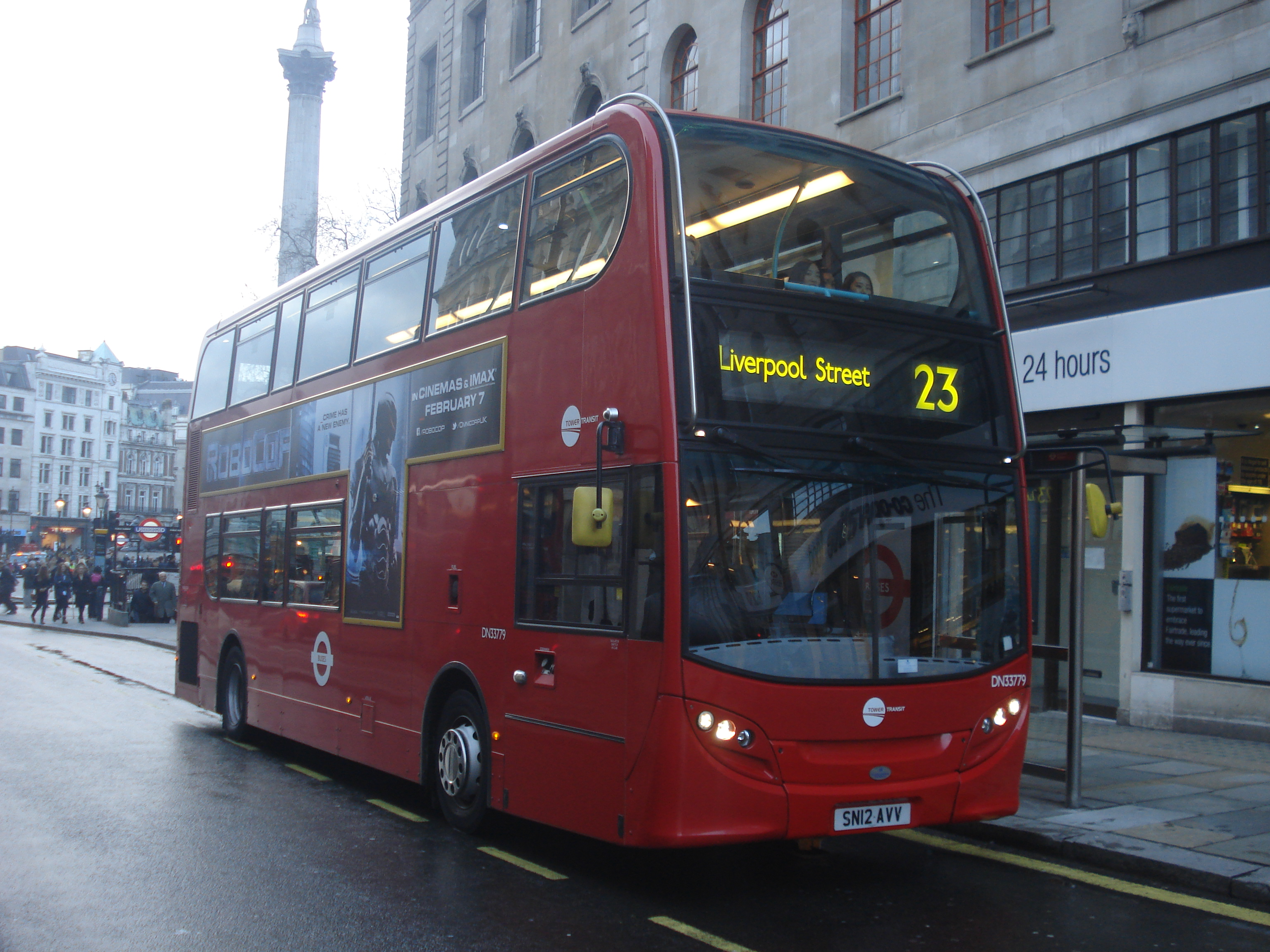
Alexander Dennis Enviro400 on route 23 at Charing Cross in February 2014

In June 2013, Australian-based bus company Transit Systems purchased First London's Atlas Road (Park Royal), Lea Interchange (Leyton) and Westbourne Park garages with 24 London bus routes and 412 buses. Also included were contracts to operate three routes (425, N550 and N551) that had yet to commence.

In October 2014, Tower Transit purchased Impact Group which operated 130 small buses for local authorities and schools out of depots in Ealing and Croydon. This was sold in August 2018 to HCT Group.

Tower Transit was included in the purchase of Transit Systems by SeaLink Travel Group (also based in Australia) in January 2020. SeaLink Travel Group was later renamed Kelsian Group in November 2021.

In September 2021, SeaLink Travel Group and the RATP Group announced that their respective West London bus operations (including London United, London Sovereign and Tower Transit's Westbourne Park garage) would merge into a new joint venture called RATP Dev Transit London, with RATP Dev having an 87.5% shareholding and Tower Transit 12.5%. The incorporation of the joint venture was finalised on 11 December 2021. Tower Transit's Lea Interchange garage, located in East London, was not part of the joint venture and remained unaffected.

In May 2022, it was announced that Tower Transit's remaining East London operations would be sold to Stagecoach London. The acquisition was finalised on 25 June 2022 and these services became operated by Stagecoach under the Lea Interchange Bus Company Limited legal entity.

In September 2022, Tower Transit announced the acquisition of LibertyBus in Jersey and CT Plus in Guernsey. In February 2025, Tower Transit announced the acquisition of Liverpool-based Huyton Travel. Tower Transit was unsuccessful in renewing the Guernsey bus contract expiring in March 2025, with services taken over by Stagecoach. However, Tower Transit was successful in renewing the Jersey bus contract for another 10 years in April 2025.

== London operations ==
=== Garages ===
==== Atlas Road (AS) ====
On 1 October 2011, this garage opened when part of Westbourne Park garage was closed to make way for Elizabeth line construction works, with the operation of routes 28, 31, 328, N28, and N31 transferred. Atlas Road operated as an outstation for Westbourne Park, so buses are seen on Atlas Road routes and vice versa. With the completion of Crossrail works, all routes returned to Westbourne Park in June 2017 with Atlas Road retained as a maintenance centre. It closed in October 2017, being taken over by London United.

==== Lea Interchange (LI) ====
Lea Interchange garage operated routes 58, 135, 236, 262, 276, 308, 339, 473, 488, 678, D8 and W14.

The garage opened in 2007 to replace the Waterden Road, Stratford garage that closed as part of the development of the Olympic Park for the 2012 Olympic and Paralympic Games. Waterden Road was opened in 1996 after a number of tender wins.

Lea Interchange began operating route 69 on 30 April 2016. CT Plus took over operation of route 26 and route N26 on 25 June 2016. London General took over operation of the route 212 and route 444 on 7 March 2020 and Docklands Buses took over the 69 on 1 May 2021. On 25 June 2022, the garage and its operations was acquired by Stagecoach London.

==== Westbourne Park (X) ====
Westbourne Park garage operated routes 13, 23, 28, 218, 295, 414, 452, C3 and N97.

Westbourne Park Garage was part of the reconstruction programme undertaken by London Transport in the early 1980s. As was common practice at the time, the new garage replaced two older garages - the small and inadequate Middle Row (X), and the larger former trolley bus garage at Stonebridge (SE). The new garage, which opened in 1981 in Great Western Road, is of unusual design in that it is built beneath the elevated A40 Westway, the roof of the garage being profiled to match the concrete flyover. Originally, the garage allocation consisted of AEC Routemasters, and a small number of Daimler Fleetlines to B20 "quiet" specification for route 18. These were supplemented in 1983 by a number of Leyland Titans for comparative trials. A new 180 metre bus parking area was built on a raised platform over railway lines as part of the Crossrail project opening in 2017.

Metroline took over the operation of route 295 on 31 October 2015. On 5 March 2016, Westbourne Park took over the operation of route N97 from London United. On 3 October 2020, Westbourne Park depot also took over the operation of route C3 from Abellio London. On 1 May 2021, routes 28 and N28 transferred to London United, with route 328 transferring to Metroline.

Westbourne Park garage was transferred to RATP Dev Transit London on 11 December 2021.

=== Fleet ===
As at May 2015, the fleet consisted of 437 buses.
