= London Buses route 18 =

London bus route

18
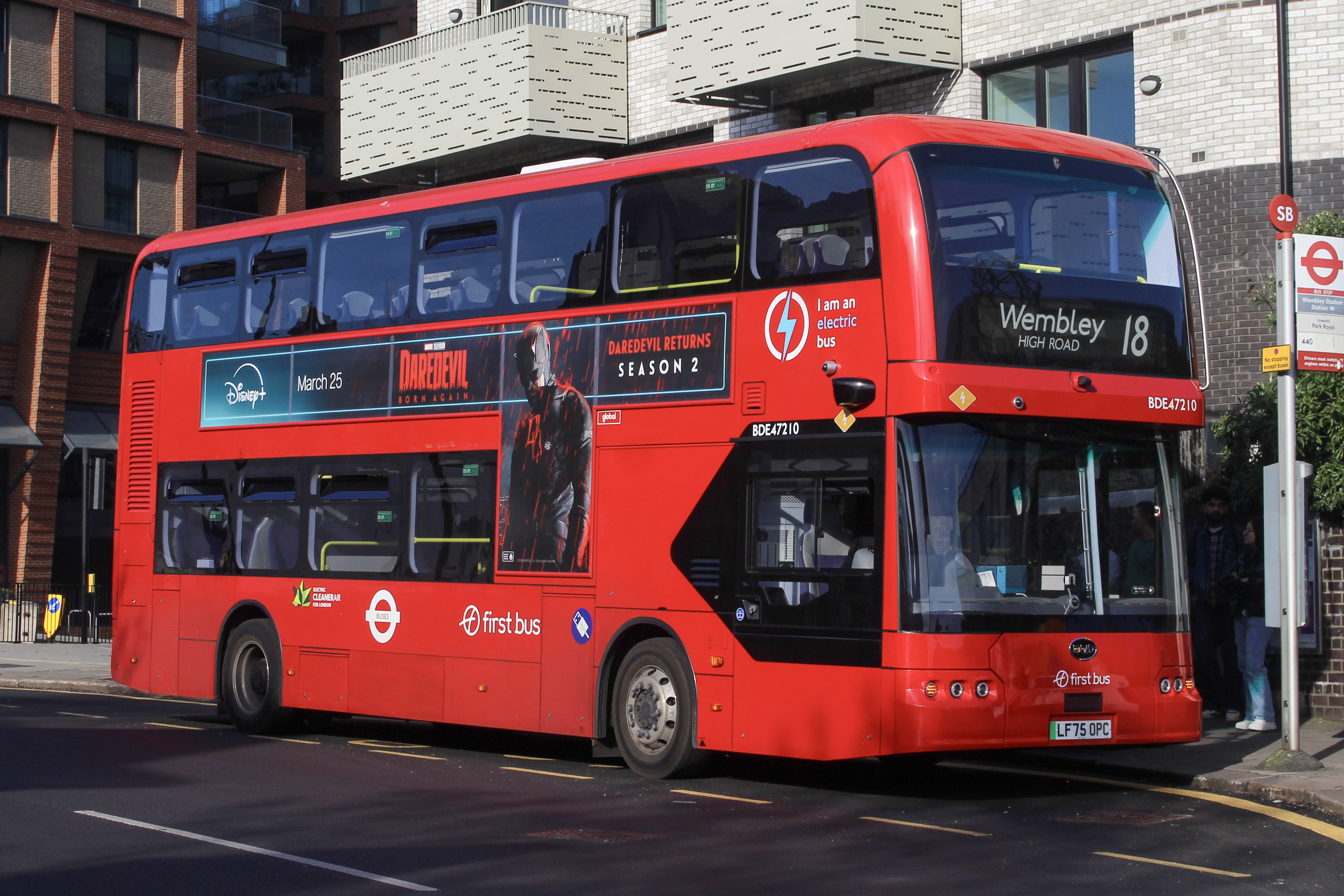
- London Transit BYD BD11B at Wembley Stadium station in April 2026

Overview
- Operator: London Transit (First Bus London)
- Garage: Westbourne Park
- Vehicle: BYD BD11B
- Peak vehicle requirement: 37
- Former operators: Metroline; First London; RATP Dev Transit London
- Night-time: N18

Route
- Start: Euston bus station
- Via: Baker Street; Kensal Green; Harlesden; Stonebridge; Wembley
- End: Sudbury & Harrow Road station
- Length: 9 miles (14 km)

Service
- Level: Daily
- Frequency: About every 4-7 minutes
- Journey time: 42-90 minutes
- Operates: 05:15 until 01:11
- Annual patronage: 12.6 million (2022/23)

London Buses route 18 is a Transport for London contracted bus route in London, England. Running between Euston bus station and Sudbury & Harrow Road station, it is operated by First Bus London subsidiary London Transit.

In the period 2022/23, it was the busiest bus route in London.

== History ==
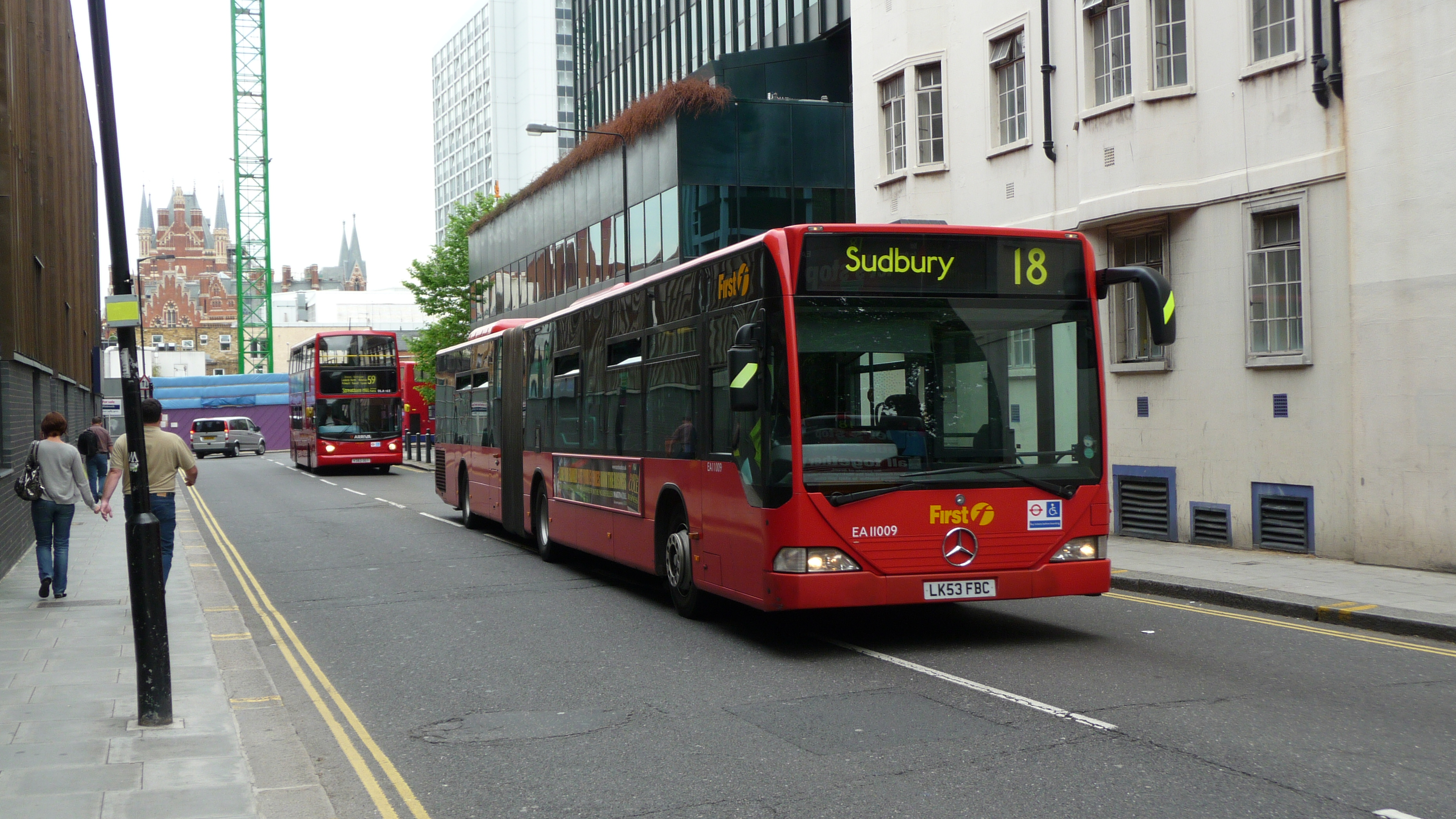
First London Mercedes-Benz Citaro O530G at Euston in June 2009

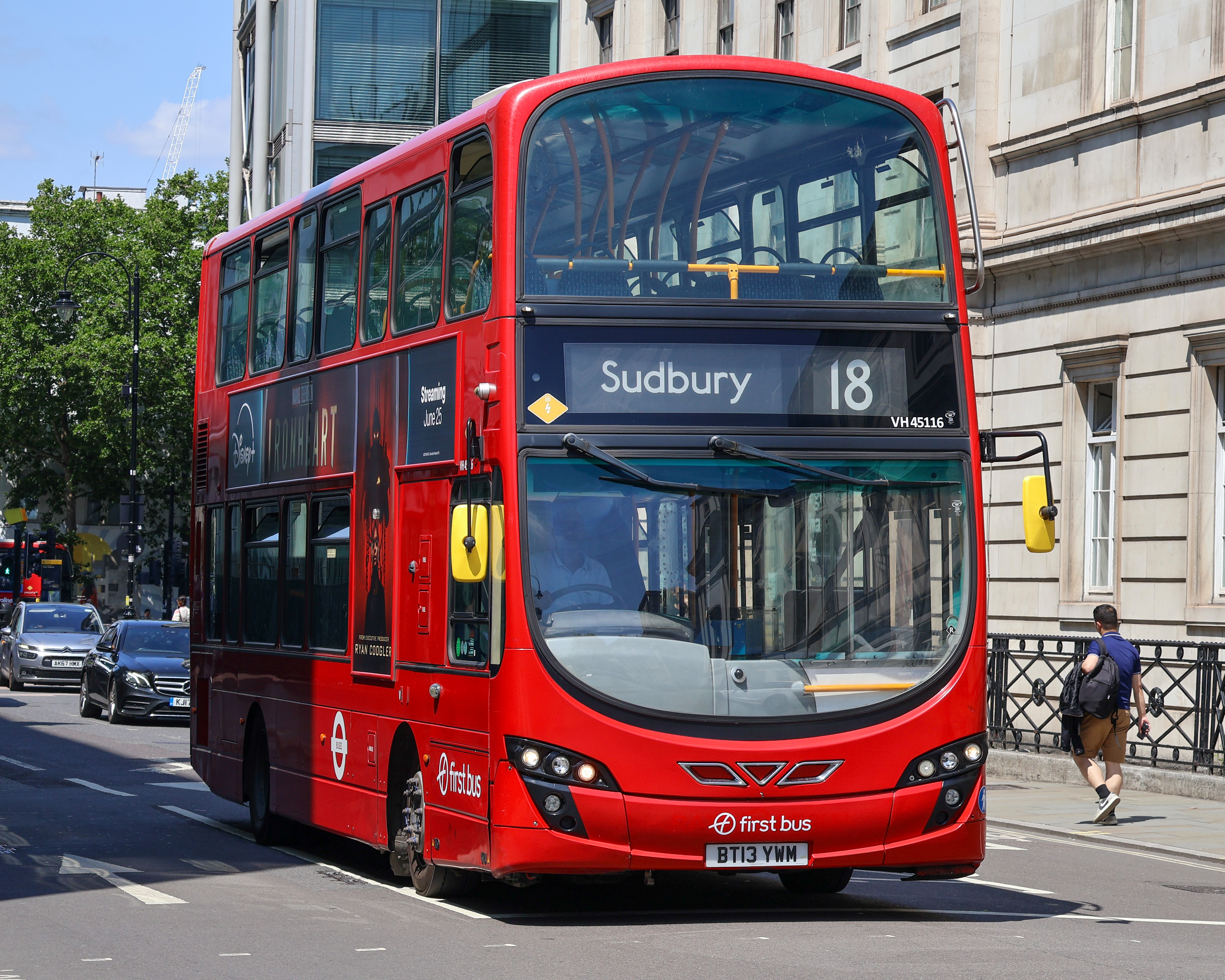
London United Wright Eclipse Gemini 2–bodied Volvo B5LH at University College London in June 2025

In 1934 there were four routes, 18, 18A, 18B and 18C. The 18 and 18A, plus 18B on weekdays, ran from London Bridge station, via Southwark Bridge, St Paul's station and Gray's Inn Road to King's Cross station. From here the 18 and 18B ran daily, the 18A on Mondays to Saturdays and the 18C on Sundays, via Paddington and Harrow Road to Harlesden, where the 18A continued to Park Royal. The other three routes ran to Stonebridge Park; the 18B ran on via the North Circular Road to Brent Cross. The 18C peeled off here to serve Wembley Empire Pool, while the 18 and 18C served Wembley and Sudbury. The 18C then headed south to Greenford and Hanwell, while the 18 continued north to Harrow and Harrow Weald.

Route 18 was withdrawn between Central London and Harlesden except on Saturday afternoons and Sundays, times at which route 18A no longer ran. The 18A, having run every four minutes, was withdrawn without replacement on 17 October 1939. The 18C Sunday extension into the centre was also withdrawn; the 18 was cut back to Wembley Empire Pool on Mondays to Saturdays, but was diverted at Wealdstone to serve Canons Park and Edgware, with a peak hours and Sundays extension to provide a service to Aldenham Works. The 18C was renumbered to 92 on 14 June 1944, with a 92A variant running to Wembley Trading Estate at certain times of the week.

Trolleybus replacement in the 1960s saw the 18 extended back to Paddington Green to replace route 662. The 18B was withdrawn, and the 18 extended except on Monday to Saturday evenings to London Bridge. The former 18A was reintroduced at peak hours, running between Acton and Paddington Green via a slightly different route. This was extended to Baker Street in 1978, but withdrawn in September.

In 1970, the 18 was cut back to run only as far out as Sudbury, with new route 182 covering the section between Wembley and Harrow Weald (and on to Watford), and the 186 the section between Harrow and Edgware, both routes later being extended to the new shopping centre at Brent Cross. In 1985 the 18 was curtailed at King's Cross, apart from a peak-hours service as far as Farringdon Street. The section between King's Cross and London Bridge was covered by new route 17.

In 1992 the Countdown real-time information system was installed at stops on route 18. The system proved popular with passengers and has been extended across London.

In November 2003, route 18 Mercedes-Benz O530G articulated buses replaced Plaxton President bodied Dennis Tridents with the route transferred from Westbourne Park garage to Willesden Junction.

In 2008, the route was named as the most problematic for crime in London. On 13 November 2010, route 18 was converted back to double-deck operation as part of the Mayor of London's policy to replace the O530Gs. New Wright Eclipse Gemini 2 bodied Volvo B9TLs were introduced, and the frequency was increased to every 4 minutes Monday to Saturday daytimes and to 6–7 minutes Sunday daytimes.

On 22 June 2013, route 18 was included in the sale of First London's Willesden Junction garage to Metroline. Upon being re-tendered it was awarded to London United's Park Royal garage from 11 November 2018.

In the period 2022/23 the route was the busiest TfL bus route, carrying 12.6 million passengers, a position it has held continuously since 2018/19 when it carried 16.7 million passengers.

On 28 February 2025, the route passed from London United to First Bus London following the acquisition of RATP Dev Transit London by FirstGroup. The route was converted to use BYD BD11B double-deckers in March 2026, along with the route transferring to First Bus London subsidiary London Transit's Westbourne Park garage.

== Current route ==
Route 18 operates via these primary locations:

- Euston bus station
- Euston Square station
- Warren Street station
- Great Portland Street station
- Regent's Park station
- Baker Street station
- Marylebone Road
- Edgware Road
- Royal Oak station
- Kensal Green station
- Harlesden Jubilee Clock
- Stonebridge Park Point Place
- Wembley Central station
- Sudbury & Harrow Road station Harrow Road
