= Fulwell bus garage =

Public transport depot in west London

Coordinates: 51°26′5″N 0°20′59″W

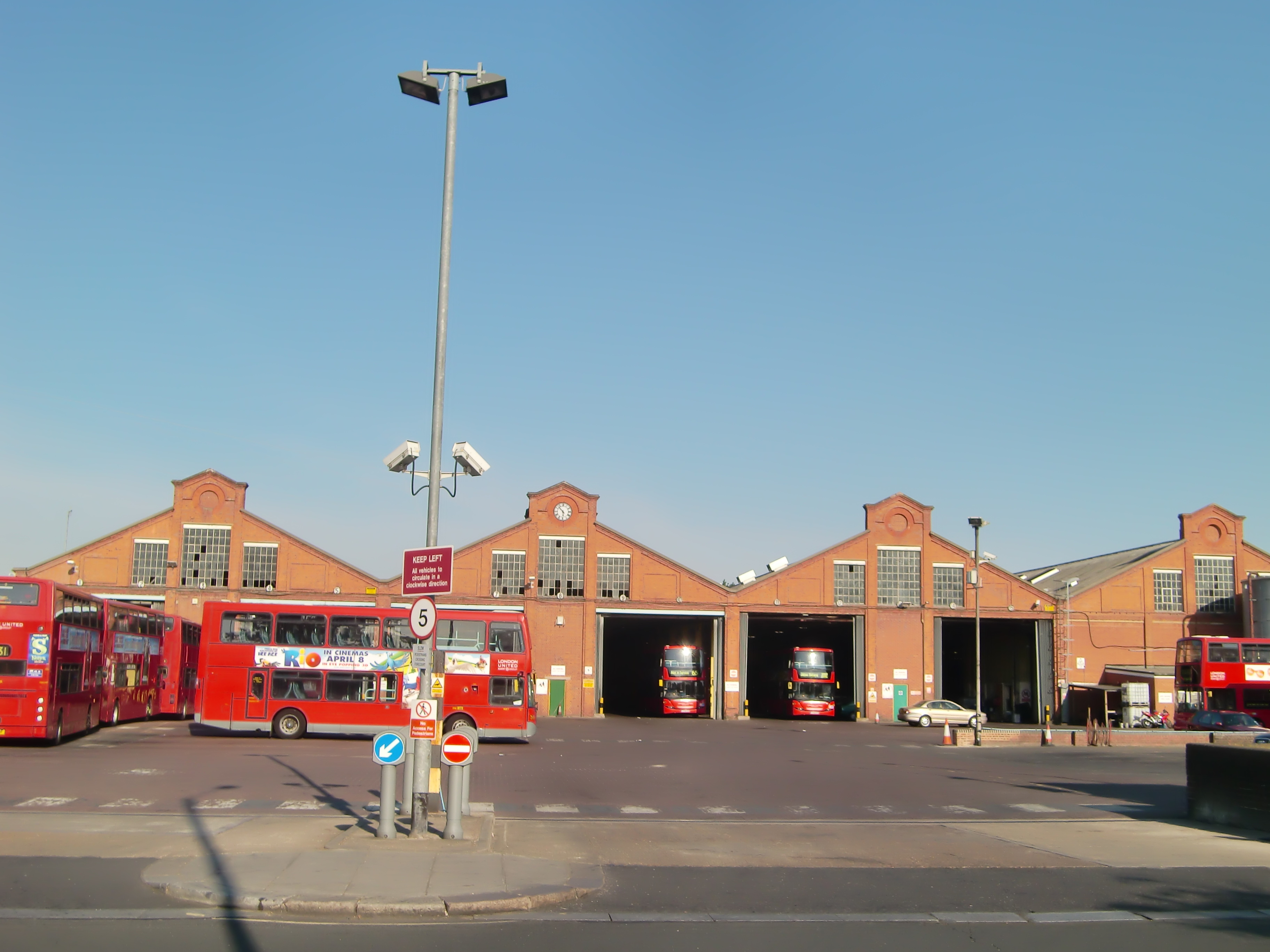
Wellington Road entrance on First Bus London's side of the garage

Fulwell Bus Garage is a Transport for London bus garage located in Twickenham in west London. It is north of Fulwell railway station and operates as two halves, with entrances on the A311 Wellington Road and B358 Stanley Road. It is currently operated by Transport UK London Bus and First Bus London.

== History ==
Fulwell Bus Garage was originally built as a tram depot for London United Tramways in 1902. The site formerly formed the southerly part of the Freake Fulwell Park Estate and came on the market following the death of the Dowager Lady Freake in 1901. London United Tramways acquired a 99-year lease of the site in April 1902 for a new tram depot. This was completed in March 1903, just as new tram routes to Hampton Court Palace started operating.

The garage had an entrance at each end, in Stanley Road and Wellington Road. The shed had 20 tracks under cover but was never used to its full capacity.

Louis Bruce, Britain's first black Olympian, worked at Fulwell Depot from at least 1906 until circa 1922.

In 1931 London's first trolleybuses moved in alongside the trams and the last trams left in 1935. In 1933 the newly formed London Passenger Transport Board took over London United Tramways. Fulwell became London Transport's main trolleybus works making use of some of the space available. It was thus one of the last two depots to convert to motor buses on 9 May 1962.

The amount of work increased after 18 April 1970 when the small Twickenham (AB) garage, near Richmond Bridge, closed. In 1986/87 the garage was rebuilt, remaining open throughout. Instead of being split along its length, it is now split across its width.

Fulwell was allocated to the London United subsidiary when London Buses was split up in preparation for privatisation. Ninety vehicles were initially allocated to the garage. It later became the company's head office.

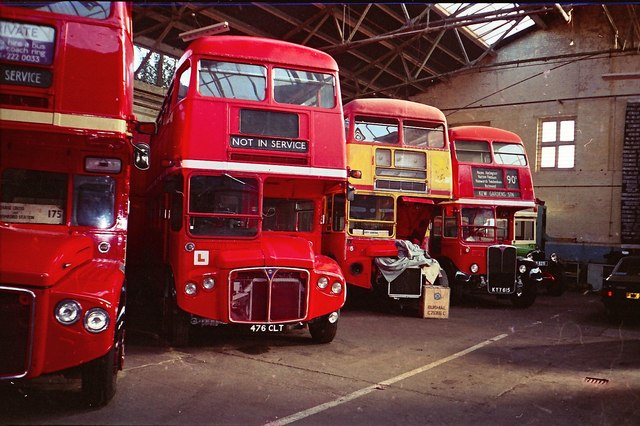
Routemasters in 1993

In 1999, Tellings-Golden Miller moved into the garage following it winning some Transport for London routes. It was included in the June 2005 sale of the business to Travel London. In May 2009 Travel London in turn was sold to Abellio London.

== Layout ==
As a bus garage Fulwell was divided in half along its length with the sports ground between the garage and South Road. The northern half of the garage, together with the front yard at the Wellington Road end, and a small rear yard were used for bus operation. The southern half of the garage, together with the Stanley Road entrance, and the remainder of the front yard were let out.

The rear part of the garage was initially used by London Buses for the sale of withdrawn buses. With the privatisation of London Buses, the sales department was wound down and closed.

The construction company Kelly used the site for a short time whilst they were laying cable television in the area.

The sports ground was redeveloped commercially many years ago, with an entrance off South Road.

== Today ==
Today both halves of the garage remain in operation.

The Stanley Road (eastern) end is occupied by Transport UK London Bus as its Twickenham (TF) garage. As at April 2022, Transport UK London Bus operate routes 111, 267, 285, 490, 671, 969, H20, H25, H26, R68 and R70 from the garage.

The Wellington Road (western) end is occupied by First Bus London as its Fulwell (FW) garage. It also houses its head office. London United operate routes 33, 65, 71, 216, 281, 290, 371, 481, 681, K3, N33 and N65 from the garage.

== Awards ==
In 2004 Fulwell was named as one of the best in London for customer service.
