= First London =

Bus operator in east and west London, England

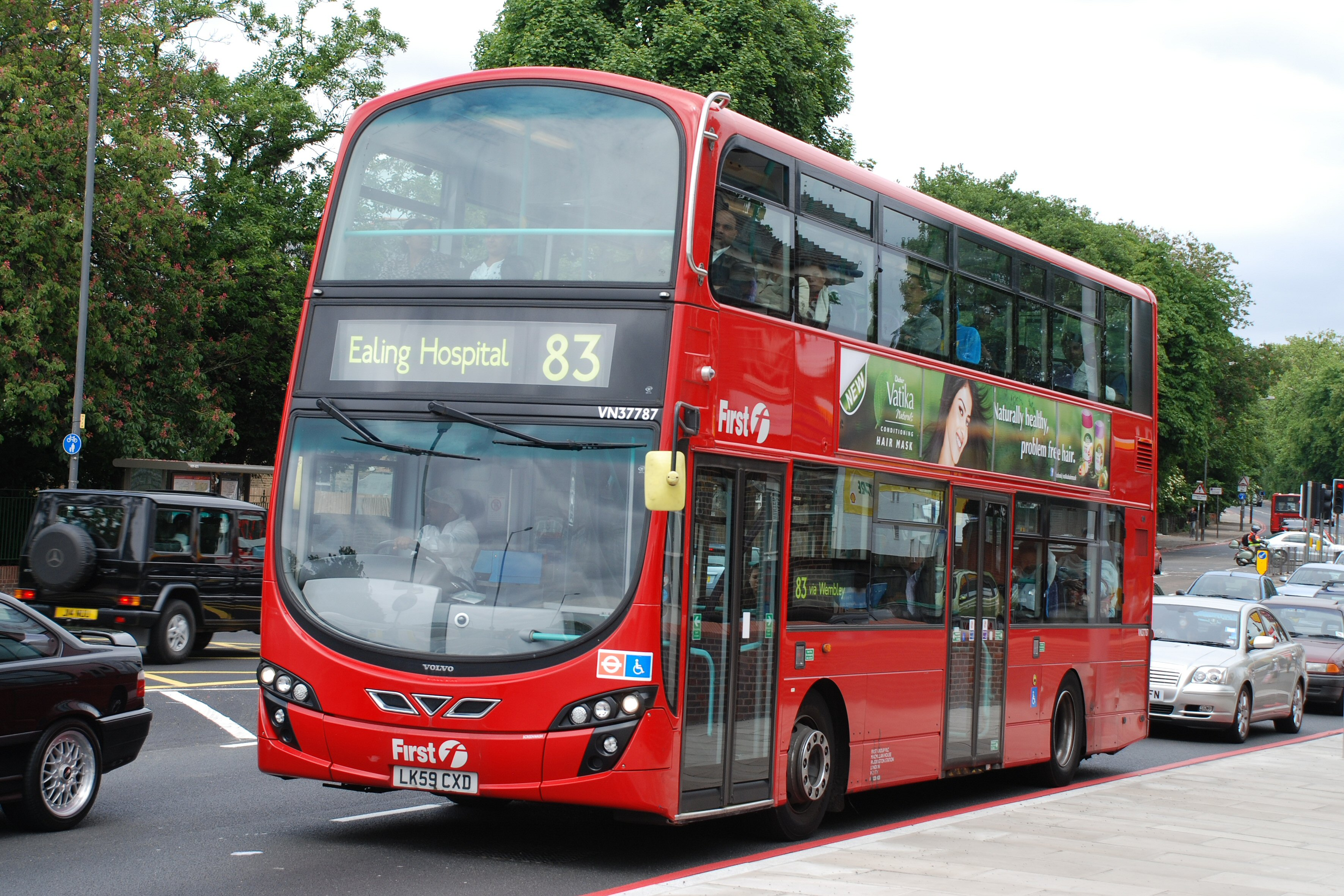
- Wright Eclipse Gemini 2 bodied Volvo B9TL on Hanger Lane, Ealing in May 2011
- Parent: FirstGroup
- Founded: 26 March 1997; 29 years ago
- Defunct: 27 September 2013; 13 years ago
- Headquarters: Paddington
- Service area: Greater London
- Service type: Bus operator
- Fleet: 1,034 (June 2013)
- Website: www.firstgroup.com/london

First London was a bus company operating services in east, west and south-east London, England. It was a subsidiary of FirstGroup and operated buses under contract to Transport for London. It was formed in the late 1990s through the acquisition of three London bus operators. First London's garages were sold off between December 2007 and June 2013 with the last closing in September 2013.

== History ==
=== Formation ===
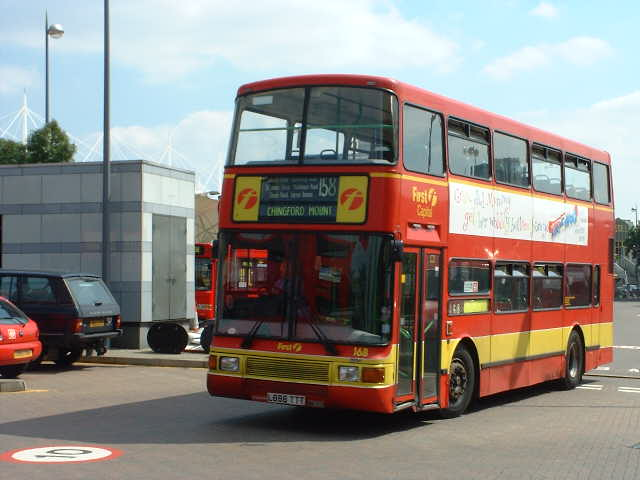
Northern Counties Palatine II-bodied Volvo Olympian on route 158 at Stratford bus station in July 2000

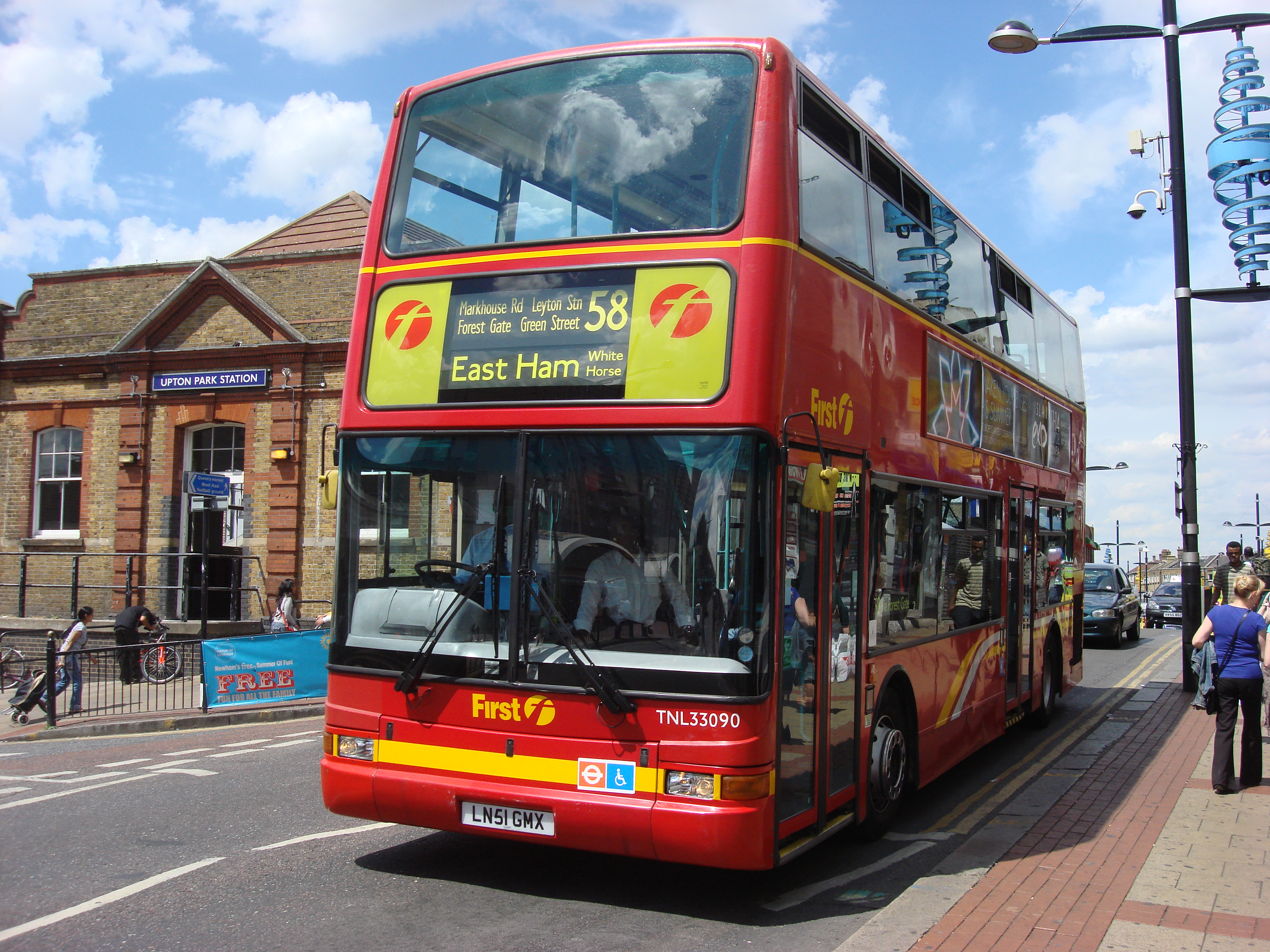
Plaxton President bodied Dennis Trident 2 at Upton Park station in July 2008, painted in the "willow leaf" livery introduced in 1999 and used until 2013

FirstBus was formed on 16 May 1995 through the merger of Badgerline and the GRT Group. Although what became First London was established in 1997, FirstBus could trace its involvement in London bus services back to 1990 when Badgerline acquired Eastern National, the Essex-based former National Bus Company subsidiary that had operated numerous routes in East London since tendering began in 1985. These operations were subsequently transferred to a new division, Thamesway Buses, before being recombined with Eastern National in the late 1990s as First Essex.

In March 1997, FirstBus purchased CentreWest, which had been established in April 1989 as a subsidiary of London Regional Transport (LRT) before being sold in a management buyout during the privatisation of London bus services in September 1994. Since 1993, CentreWest had been using local identities based on each of its garages, such as Ealing Buses at Greenford garage and Challenger at Alperton garage. In March 1996, the operator had additionally acquired Southall based London Buslines from the Q-Drive group for £7.65 million (equivalent to £15,355,000 in 2025). All these identities were originally retained, with buses receiving new-style fleetnames incorporating FirstBus's corporate f logo, however in December 1997, CentreWest was renamed First CentreWest with the wider rebranding of FirstBus to the FirstGroup; while the buses' fleetnames were revised again so that "First" was prominent, the local identities became secondary.

On 8 July 1998, the FirstGroup purchased former CNT Group subsidiary Capital Citybus from its management team for £14.1 million (equivalent to £27,369,000 in 2025). The operation was subsequently renamed First Capital.

In March 2001, the FirstGroup consolidated the CentreWest and Capital operations under the First London brand. Both were managed from CentreWest's head office beside Paddington station, as was First Beeline, the former Beeline operation that had also been acquired by CentreWest from Q-Drive in 1996. The London Buslines operation was wound down, with its routes, buses and license all being transferred to CentreWest by September 2001.

=== Garage sales and demise ===
As a result of the loss of tendered bus service contracts, in December 2007, First London's Orpington garage, which had been established by CentreWest in 1995, was sold to Metrobus, along with its routes and 35 buses. In March 2012, Northumberland Park garage was sold to Go-Ahead London for £14 million (equivalent to £20,133,000 in 2025), with operations allocated to its London General subsidiary.

In June 2013, FirstGroup sold Alperton, Greenford, Hayes, Uxbridge and Willesden Junction garages with 494 buses to Metroline and Atlas Road (Park Royal), Lea Interchange (Leyton) and Westbourne Park garages with 412 buses to Tower Transit.

First London ceased operating on 27 September 2013 after its remaining contracts with Transport for London expired.

=== Revival ===
In December 2024, the FirstGroup announced it had agreed to purchase the RATP Dev Transit London business from the RATP Group for £90 million. Upon its completion in 2025, the deal will give the FirstGroup a 12% market share of London's tendered bus services, with ten garages across Central and West London, one of which is First's former Westbourne Park garage, a fleet of 982 buses and around 3,700 employees. The deal was completed on 28 February 2025 when First Bus London commenced.

== Fleet ==
As of June 2013, the First London fleet consisted of 1,034 buses, the majority passed on to Tower Transit and Metroline West following the cessation of operations; some were retained to operate First London's final routes out of Dagenham before moving on to other First operations after the expiriry of their tender contracts.

== First Capital East Limited ==
=== Dagenham (DM) ===
Dagenham garage, the sole operation of First Capital East Limited following the 2004 closure of its Harold Wood outstation, operated London bus routes 165, 179 and 252, and 24-hour route 365 until 27 September 2013 when their contracts expired. These routes all passed to Stagecoach London.

== First Capital North Limited ==
=== Lea Interchange (LI) ===
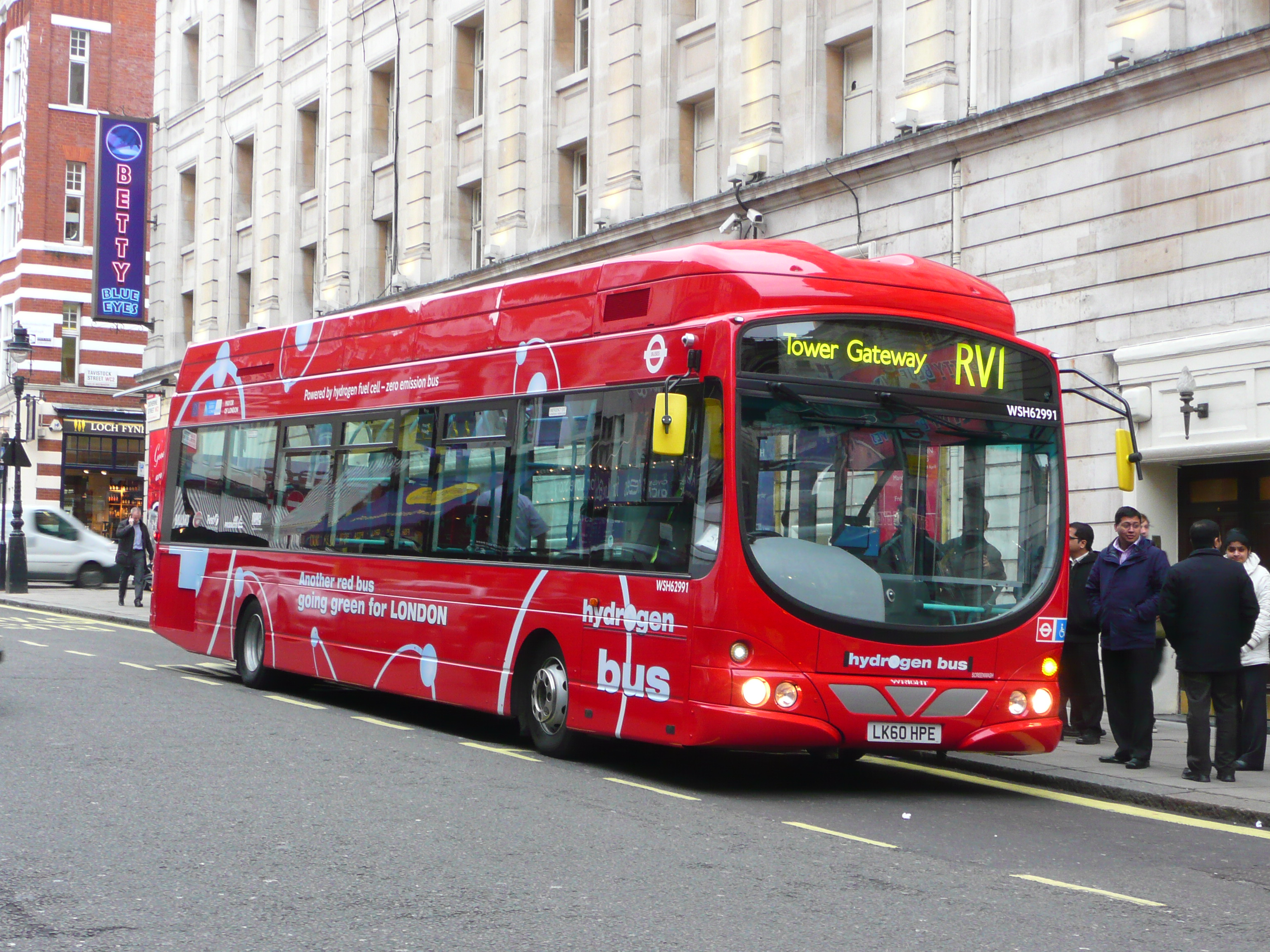
London's first hydrogen fuel cell bus, a Wright Pulsar 2 Hydrogen-powered bodied VDL SB200, on route RV1 at Covent Garden in January 2011

Lea Interchange garage in Leyton, the sole operation of First Capital North Limited, operated London bus routes 26, 30, 58, 236, 308, 339, RV1, W14, W15, 24-hour route 25, night bus N26 and school route 686.

==== History ====
Lea Interchange garage opened in 2007 to replace the Waterden Road garage in Stratford, which closed as part of the development of the Olympic Park for the 2012 Olympic and Paralympic Games. Waterden Road was opened in 1996 after a number of tender wins and in 2004, had received Mercedes-Benz Citaro hydrogen buses for evaluation on route 25 and subsequently on route RV1. Lea Interchange garage was sold to Tower Transit on 22 June 2013.

== CentreWest London Buses Limited ==
Operated seven bus garages. In June 2013 Alperton, Greenford, Hayes, Uxbridge and Willesden Junction were sold to Metroline and Atlas Road and Westbourne Park to Tower Transit.

=== Atlas Road (AS) ===
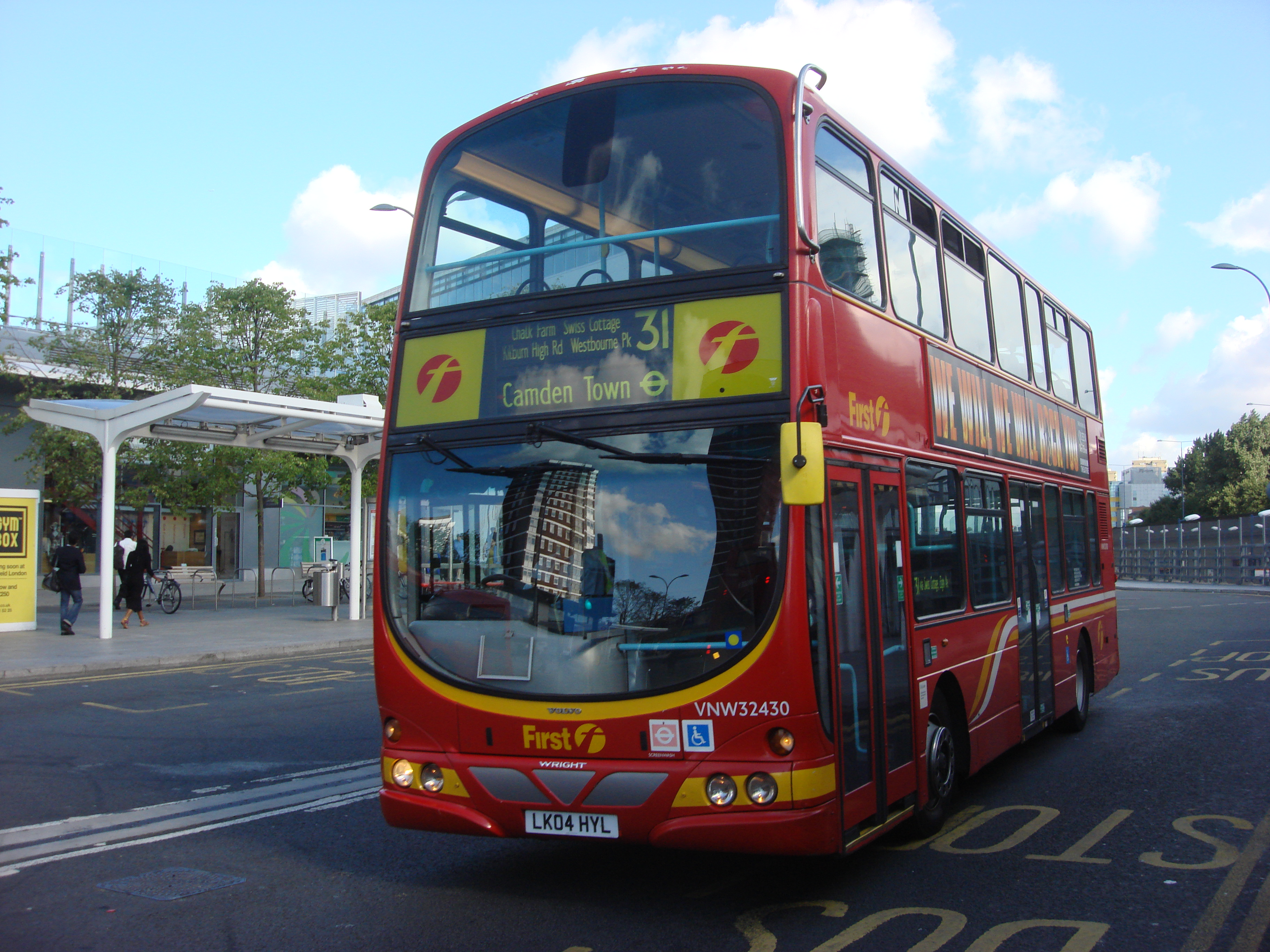
Wright Eclipse Gemini bodied Volvo B7TL on route 31 at White City bus station in August 2010

Atlas Road garage in Park Royal operated London bus routes 28, 31, 328, 24-hour route 266 and night routes N28 and N31.

==== History ====
On 1 October 2011 this depot opened when part of Westbourne Park depot was closed to make way for Crossrail construction with operation of routes 28, 31, 328, N28 and N31 transferred. Atlas Road operated as an outstation for Westbourne Park, so buses were seen on Atlas Road routes and vice versa.

=== Greenford (G) ===
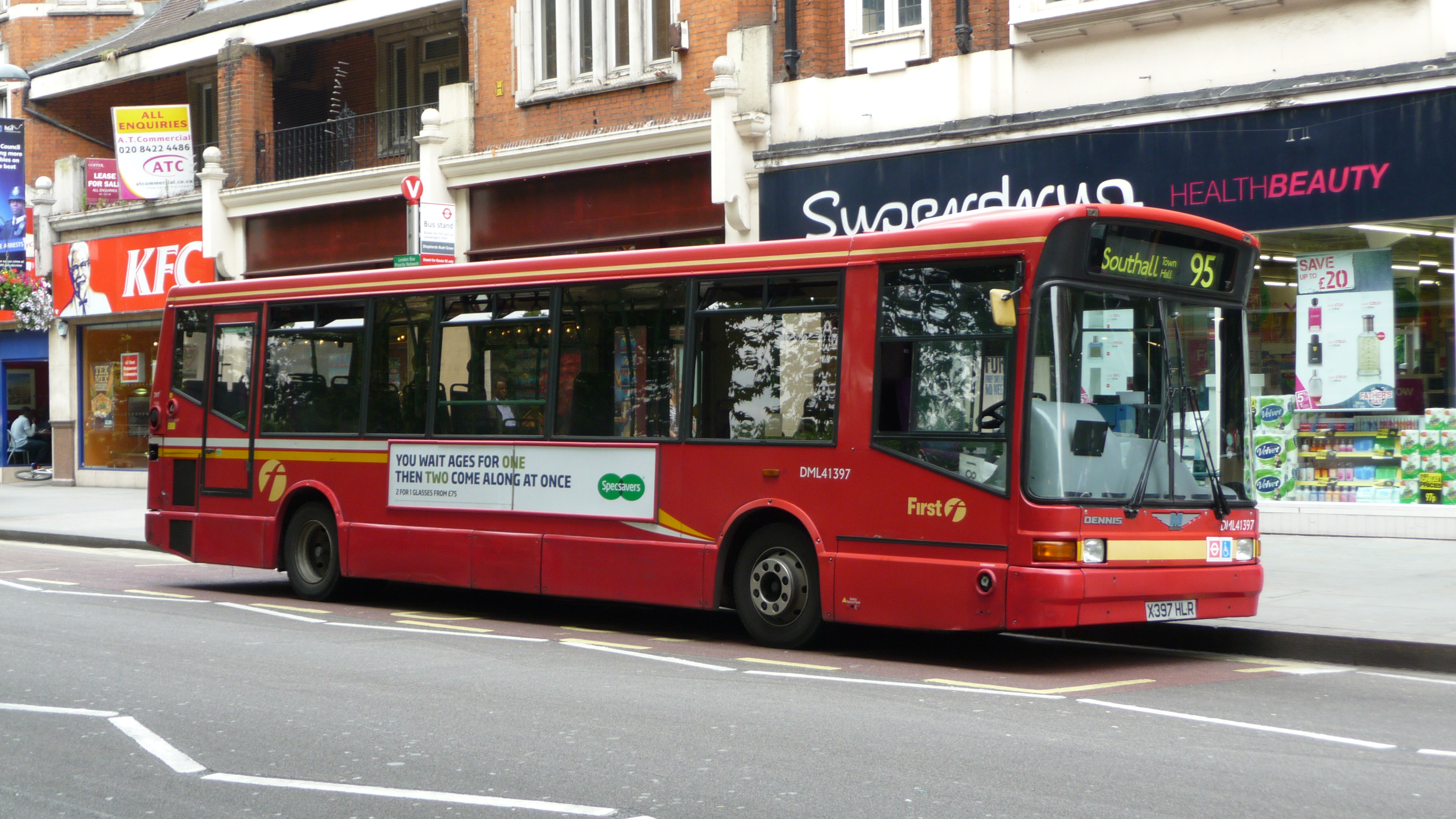
Marshall Capital bodied Dennis Dart SLF on route 95 in Shepherd's Bush in June 2009

Greenford garage operated London bus routes 92, 95, 282, E1, E3, E5, E7, E9 and E10.

==== History ====
Greenford bus garage is part of a Ealing London Borough Council depot and was first used in March 1993 as a midibus base. The opening of Greenford garage led to the closure of another garage in Hanwell, and by 1995, Greenford was operating 110 midibuses. The standard vehicles the garage in the late 1990s were Wright bodied Renault midibuses and Marshall minibuses, however both types had a bad reputation and did not last long in the CentreWest fleet.

From late 2003 until 14 March 2009, Ealing Community Transport operated London Buses route 195 from the Greenford depot using garage code EY.

In June 2013, Greenford garage was sold to Metroline along with all of the buses stationed there.

=== Hayes (HS) ===
Hayes garage operated London bus route 195, 207, 427 and night route N207. In June 2013, Hayes Garage was sold to Metroline along with all of the buses stationed there.

=== Alperton (ON) ===
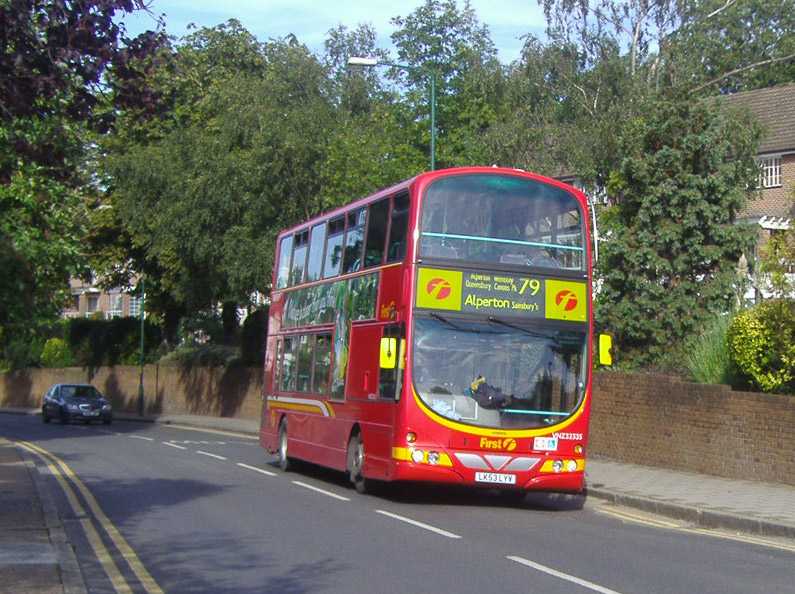
Wright Eclipse Gemini bodied Volvo B7TL on route 79 in Wembley in August 2008

Alperton garage operated London bus routes 223, 224, 245, 487 and 24-hour route 83.

==== History ====
The garage, located adjacent to the Piccadilly line tube station of the same name, was one of three garages built by the London Passenger Transport Board as part of the board's New Works Programme. When Alperton garage opened in June 1939, it had an allocation of 59 STL double-deckers that had been reallocated from the Cricklewood, Hanwell, Harrow Weald and Willesden garages. Alperton's headroom made the garage one of the few able to take utility Guy Arabs, and at one stage, these made up its complete allocation. Alperton garage was enlarged between 1976 and 1978, the extension of which encompassed an adjacent former Underground substation, as well as the site of London Transport's Lifts and Escalators department.

Alperton passed to the CentreWest subsidiary with the break-up of London Regional Transport in April 1989. After CentreWest had become the first London Buses subsidiary to be privatised in a management buyout in September 1994, buses based at Alperton were branded Challenger as opposed to using the CentreWest Buses brand. By 1995, Alperton was also performing most of the maintenance for the Centrewest operation and had also become the home of the training fleet.

In June 2013, Alperton garage was sold to Metroline along with all of the buses stationed there. On 10 September 2021, Alperton garage was closed by Metroline to make way for redevelopment.

=== Uxbridge (UX) ===
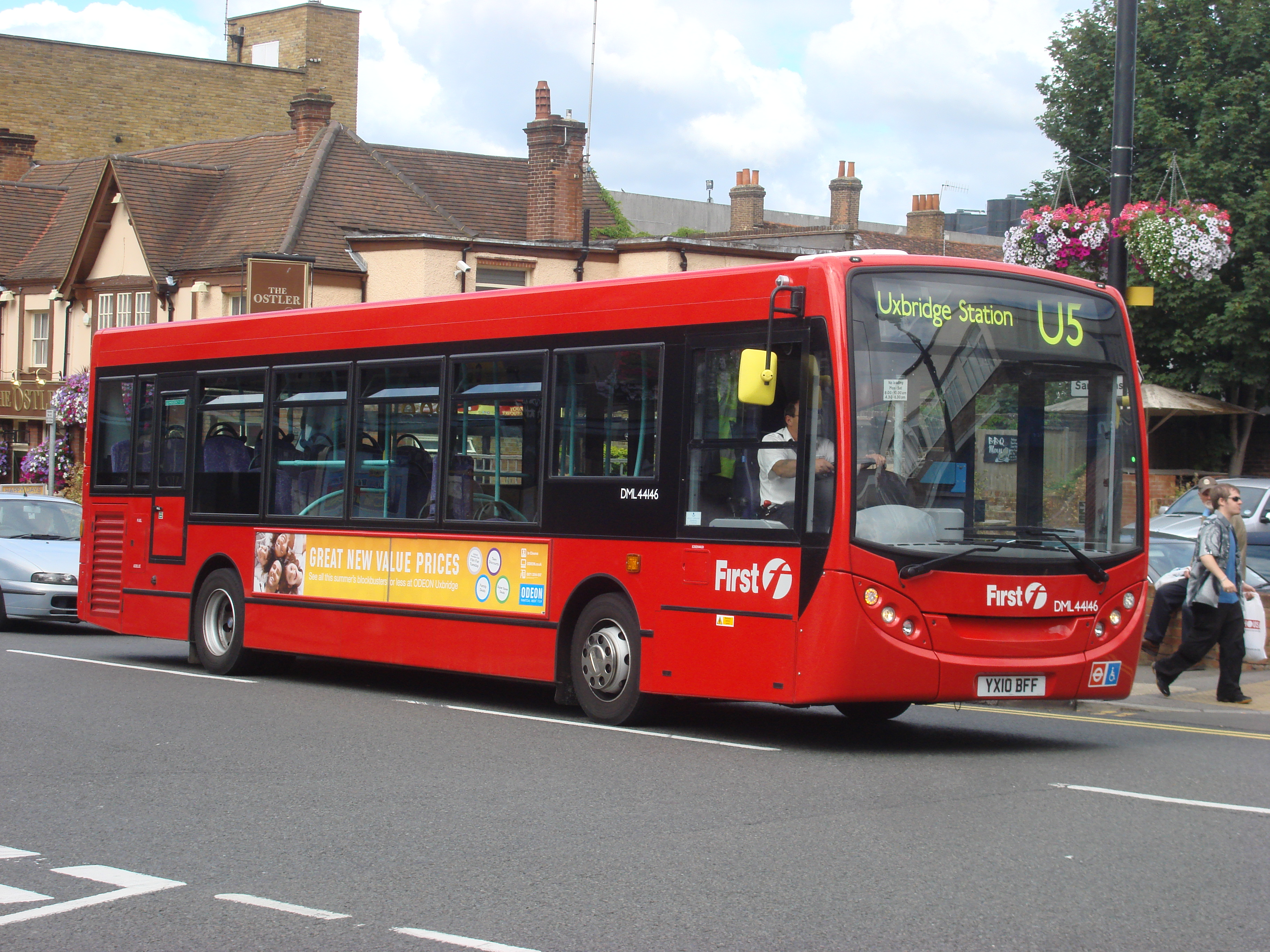
Alexander Dennis Enviro200 Dart on route U5 in Uxbridge in August 2010 painted in the company's final livery, all-red with white First fleetnames, introduced in 2009

Uxbridge garage operated London bus routes 331, 607, A10, U1, U2, U3, U4, U5 and U10.

==== History ====
The original Uxbridge garage was located around half a mile outside Uxbridge itself on the Oxford Road and was built by the London General Omnibus Company in 1921. The garage passed to Thames Valley a year later, eventually being handed back to London General on 31 December 1928. When the Greater London Council was created in 1965, Uxbridge was one of only three London Transport Central Area that fell outside the boundaries of the new Greater London, instead located in the former county of Middlesex.

Following the Second World War, it was planned for Uxbridge garage to be rebuilt entirely. This, however, remained shelved, with the garage instead extended over an open parking area during 1954. A new Uxbridge garage was planned shortly afterwards, although construction work did not begin until 1979. The new garage, located next to Uxbridge tube station and occupying the lower ground floor of a multi-use development, opened in late 1983.

After passing to the CentreWest subsidiary in 1989, Uxbridge garage began operating the U-Line network of local routes using 16 seater Alexander bodied Mercedes-Benz midibuses in an initiative by London Regional Transport. Buses based at the depot were rebranded from using CentreWest fleetnames to being branded as Uxbridge Buses. The growth of use of the U-Line services over the years since 1989 meant that larger buses were put into service on these routes, with double-deckers being moved from Hanwell in March 1993.

Uxbridge garage also operated the busy routes 207 and 607, the latter of which received a fleet of refurbished East Lancs Greenway bodied Leyland Nationals branded for the service in 1992, which themselves were replaced with 15 Northern Counties Palatine II bodied Volvo Olympian double-deckers during 1996 to aid with capacity and frequency upgrades.

In 1994, the garage was allocated some of London's first low-floor buses, these being Wright Pathfinder bodied Dennis Lance SLFs with CentreWest branding for route 222.

=== Westbourne Park (X) ===
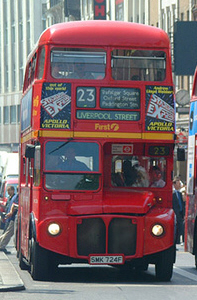
AEC Routemaster on route 23 on the Strand, circa 2001

Westbourne Park garage operated London bus routes 9 (Heritage), 70 and 24-hour routes 23 and 295.

==== History ====
Westbourne Park Garage was part of the re-construction programme undertaken by the London Transport Executive in the early 1980s. As was common practice at the time, the new garage replaced two older garages – the small and inadequate Middle Row (X), and the larger former trolley bus depot at Stonebridge (SE). The new garage, which opened in 1981 on Great Western Road, is of unusual design in that it is built beneath the elevated A40 Westway, the roof of the garage being profiled to match the concrete flyover. Originally, the garage allocation consisted of AEC Routemasters, and a small number of Daimler Fleetlines to B20 "quiet" specification for Route 18. These were supplemented in 1983 by a number of Leyland Titans for comparative trials.

In December 1998, CentreWest launched the Gold Arrow brand for routes 28 and 31 at Westbourne Park. This brand employed 16 seater Alexander bodied Mercedes-Benz 811D midibuses in an initiative by London Regional Transport to increase the frequency of the two routes by 60% at peak times.

When privatised, Westbourne Park operated two routes operated by AEC Routemasters, routes 7 and 23. These were replaced by Dennis Trident 2s in July 2004 and September 2003 respectively. In November 2005, Westbourne Park commenced operating Heritage route 9 with a fleet of restored Routemasters.

On 22 January 2006, an arson attack destroyed seven buses and damaged five others that were parked overnight at Westbourne Park.

In June 2013, Westbourne Park garage was sold to Tower Transit along with all of the buses stationed there.

=== Willesden Junction (WJ) ===
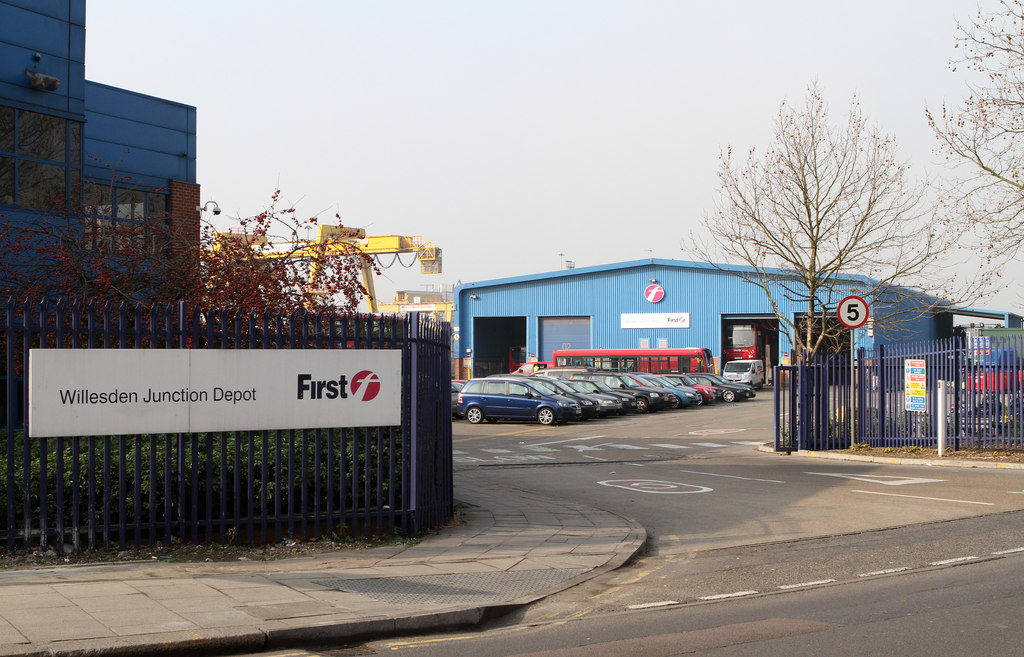
Willesden Junction garage and forecourt, March 2012

Willesden Junction garage operated London bus routes 18, 187, 206, 226, 228 and night route N18.

In November 2005, a driving simulator developed by FAAC Incorporated was installed at Willesden Junction garage for use by First London's driver training school. Claimed to be the first of its kind in Europe, the simulator incorporated the front portion and cab area of a Wright Eclipse Gemini bodied Volvo B7TL double-decker bus type typically operated by First at the time, although projections in the rear-view mirror allowed for a single-deck bus, an empty or full double-decker, or an articulated bus to be depicted. Various road types, as well as Westbourne Park garage and Walthamstow bus station, were available for training use, and conditions such as heavy traffic, inclement weather and engine breakdowns or fires also featured.

In June 2013, Willesden Junction garage was sold to Metroline along with all of the buses stationed there.
