= London Buses route 23 =

London bus route

23
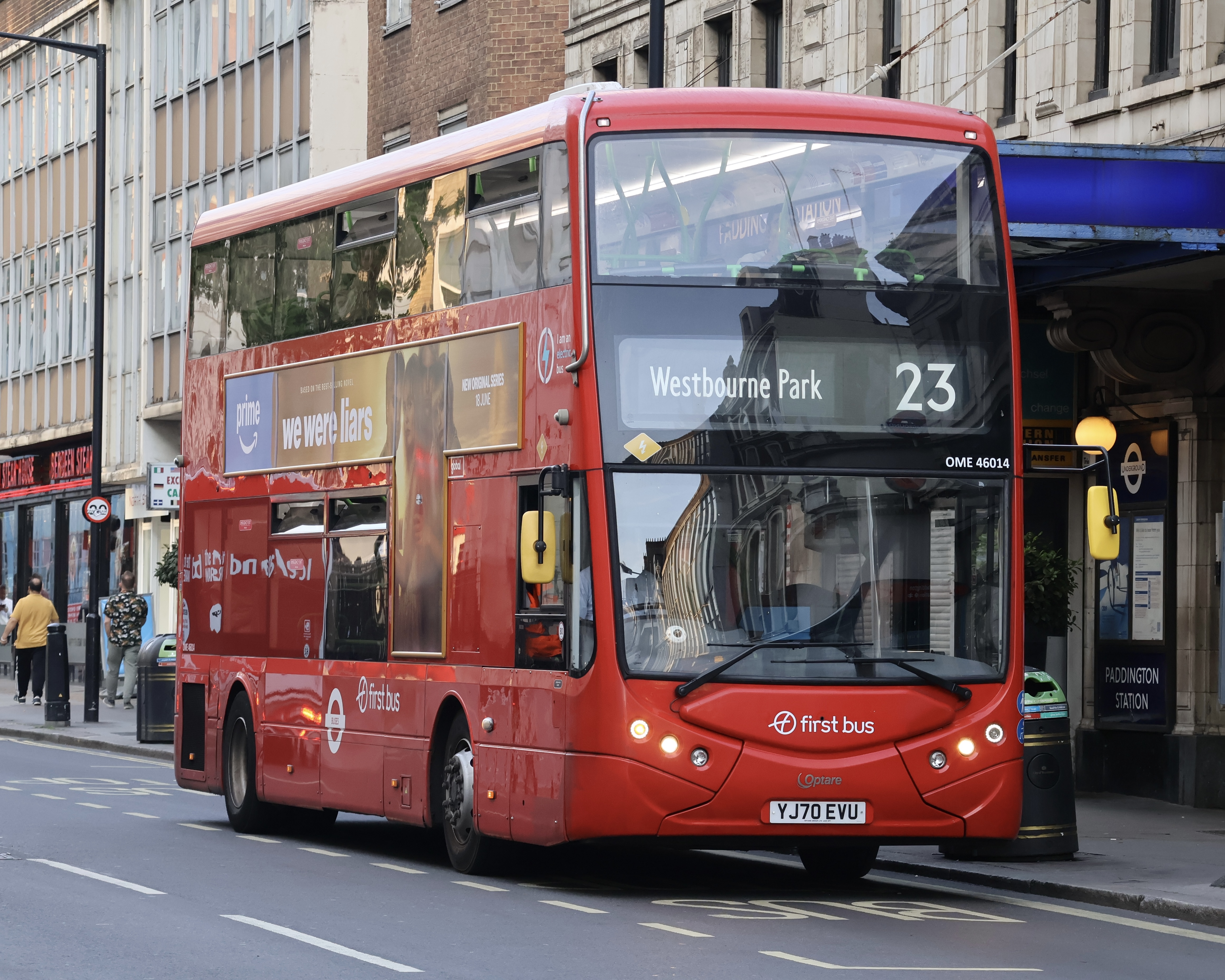
- London Transit Optare MetroDecker EV at Paddington station in June 2025

Overview
- Operator: London Transit (First Bus London)
- Garage: Westbourne Park
- Vehicle: Alexander Dennis Enviro400H; Volvo B5LH Wright Eclipse Gemini 2
- Peak vehicle requirement: Day: 14; Night: 4
- Predecessors: Route 10; Route 15
- Former operators: RATP Dev Transit London; Tower Transit
- Night-time: 24-hour service

Route
- Start: Aldwych
- Via: Trafalgar Square; Piccadilly Circus; Green Park; Hyde Park Corner; Marble Arch; Paddington; Ladbroke Grove
- End: Westbourne Park bus garage
- Length: 8 miles (13 km)

Service
- Level: 24-hour service
- Frequency: About every 12-15 minutes
- Journey time: 46-95 minutes
- Operates: 24-hour service

London Buses route 23 is a Transport for London contracted bus route in London, England. Running between Aldwych and Westbourne Park bus garage, it is operated by First Bus London subsidiary London Transit.

== History ==
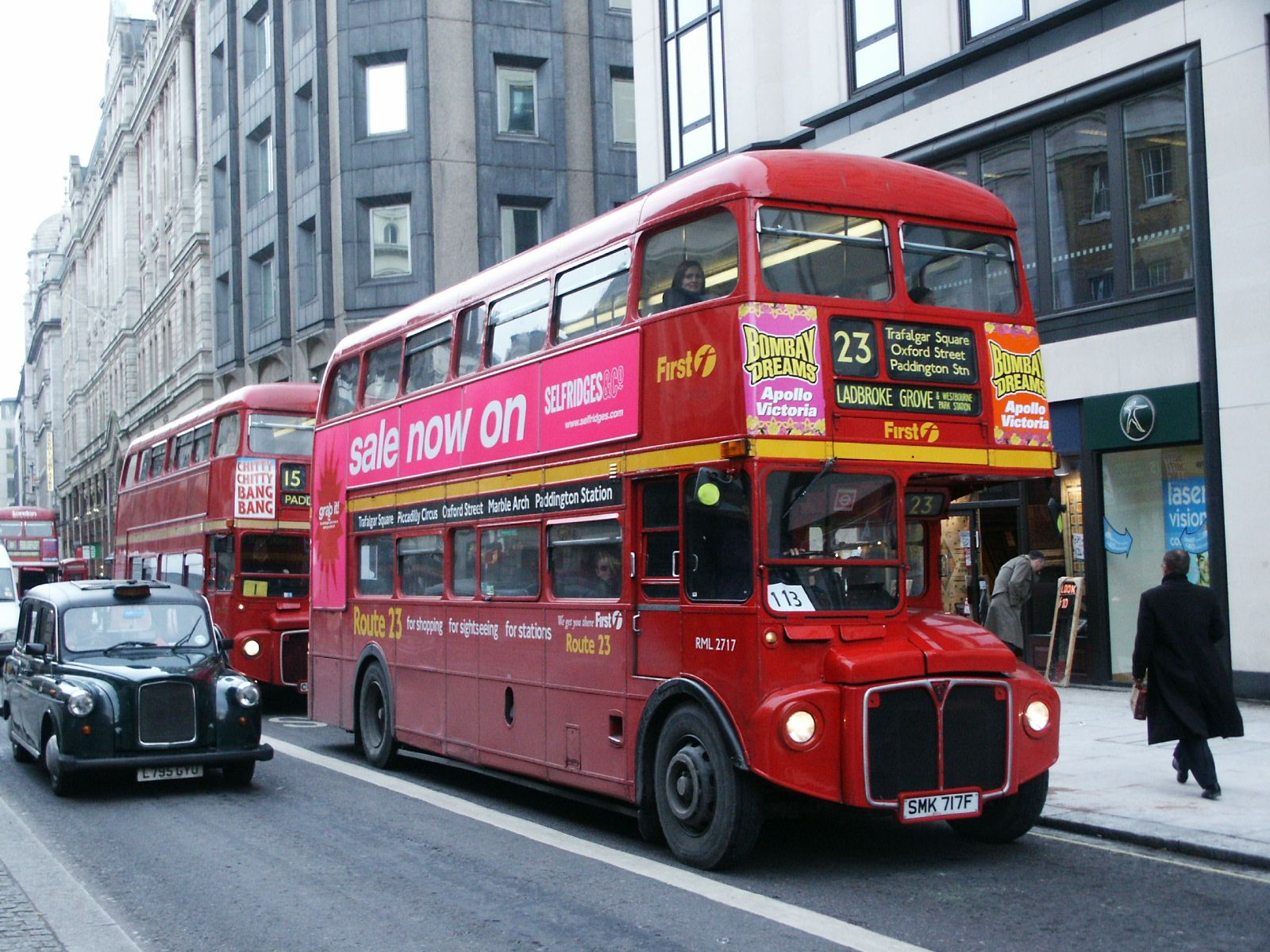
First London AEC Routemaster on the Strand in January 2003

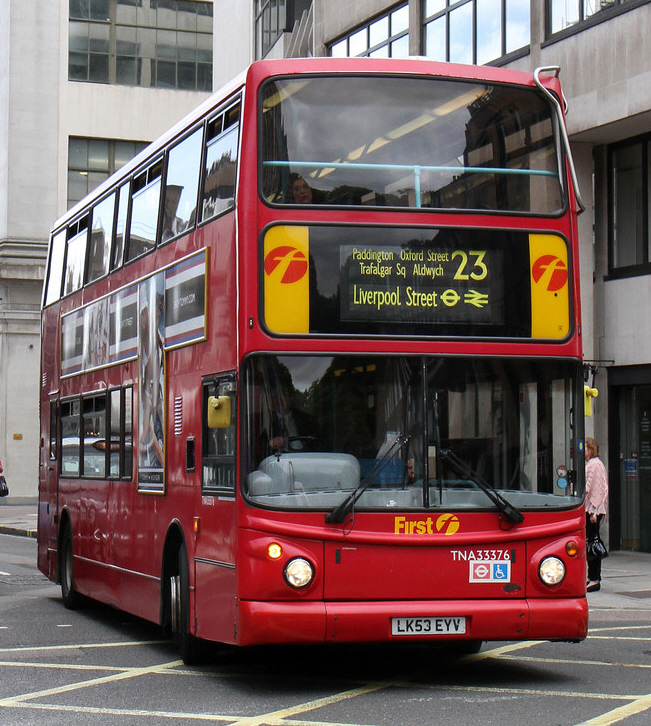
First London Alexander ALX400 bodied Dennis Trident 2 in May 2011

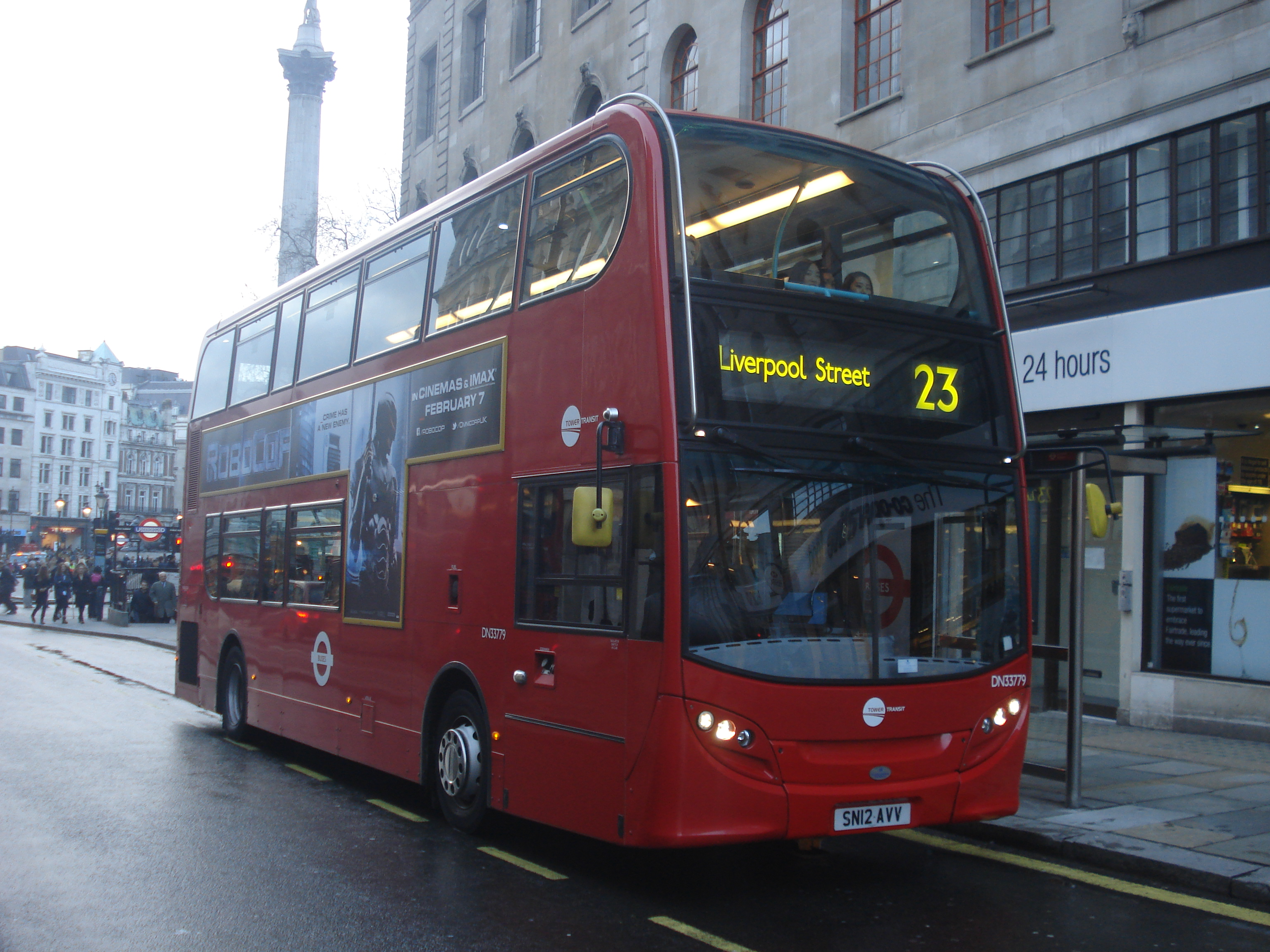
Tower Transit Alexander Dennis Enviro400 at Charing Cross station in February 2014

Route 23 was introduced on 18 July 1992 between Westbourne Park station and Liverpool Street bus station from First CentreWest's Westbourne Park garage. On 14 November 2003, Alexander ALX400 bodied Dennis Trident 2s replaced the AEC Routemasters that had operated it since its inception.

In January 2009, the route's peak frequency was reduced from twelve buses per hour to ten, as part of Transport for London's policy of reducing the number of buses using Oxford Street in order to reduce congestion and pollution by 10% in 2009 and a further 10% in 2010. The off-peak service already operated at this frequency. On 5 January 2009, a bus operating on the route crashed into a shop in Westbourne Grove after swerving to avoid a van, injuring ten people.

Later in 2009, Transport for London decided not to proceed with a possible change of the eastbound route in the Elgin Crescent area, following a consultation with residents and local interest groups. The proposal would have routed the eastbound 23 along Ladbroke Gardens instead of Elgin Crescent, while routes 52 and 452 would continue to run along Elgin Crescent in both directions. The most common benefit stated amongst supporters was fewer buses along the overcrowded Elgin Crescent; those opposing the change were concerned about safety at the junction of Ladbroke Grove and Ladbroke Gardens, and the suitability of Ladbroke Gardens to accommodate a bus service.

First London had successfully retained route 23 with a new contract starting on 13 November 2010, and the route was included in the sale of First London's Westbourne Park garage to Tower Transit on 22 June 2013.

Tower Transit successfully retained route 23 with a new contract starting on 14 November 2015. On 30 September 2017 route 23 was withdrawn between Aldwych and Liverpool Street bus station.

On 24 November 2018 as part of a programme to reduce the number of bus routes traversing Oxford Street, the section of route 23 between Marble Arch and Aldwych was diverted to Hammersmith, partly replacing route 10.

On 23 November 2022, it was announced that a proposed rerouting of route 23 at Hyde Park Corner to serve its previous terminus of Aldwych instead of Hammersmith, only now via Green Park, Piccadilly Circus and Trafalgar Square, would be going ahead following a consultation; it was implemented on 29 April 2023.

On 28 February 2025, the route passed from RATP Dev Transit London to First Bus London following the acquisition of RATP Dev Transit London by FirstGroup.

On 24 June 2026, a bus allocated to route 23 caught fire at Westbourne Park bus garage in west London. The bus involved and two charging points were destroyed in the fire. All Optare MetroDecker EVs in the United Kingdom were temporarily withdrawn from service at the same time. The cause of the fire was put under investigation.

== In popular culture ==
Radio presenter Geoff Lloyd featured the route in the show Boring? The number 23 bus? Never! at the Boring Conference in December 2010.

== Current route ==
Route 23 operates via these primary locations:

- Aldwych
- Charing Cross station
- Trafalgar Square
- Piccadilly Circus
- Green Park station
- Hyde Park Corner station
- Marble Arch station
- St Mary's Hospital
- Paddington station
- Ladbroke Grove station
- Ladbroke Grove Sainsbury's
- Westbourne Park bus garage
