= First Bus London =

London bus operator

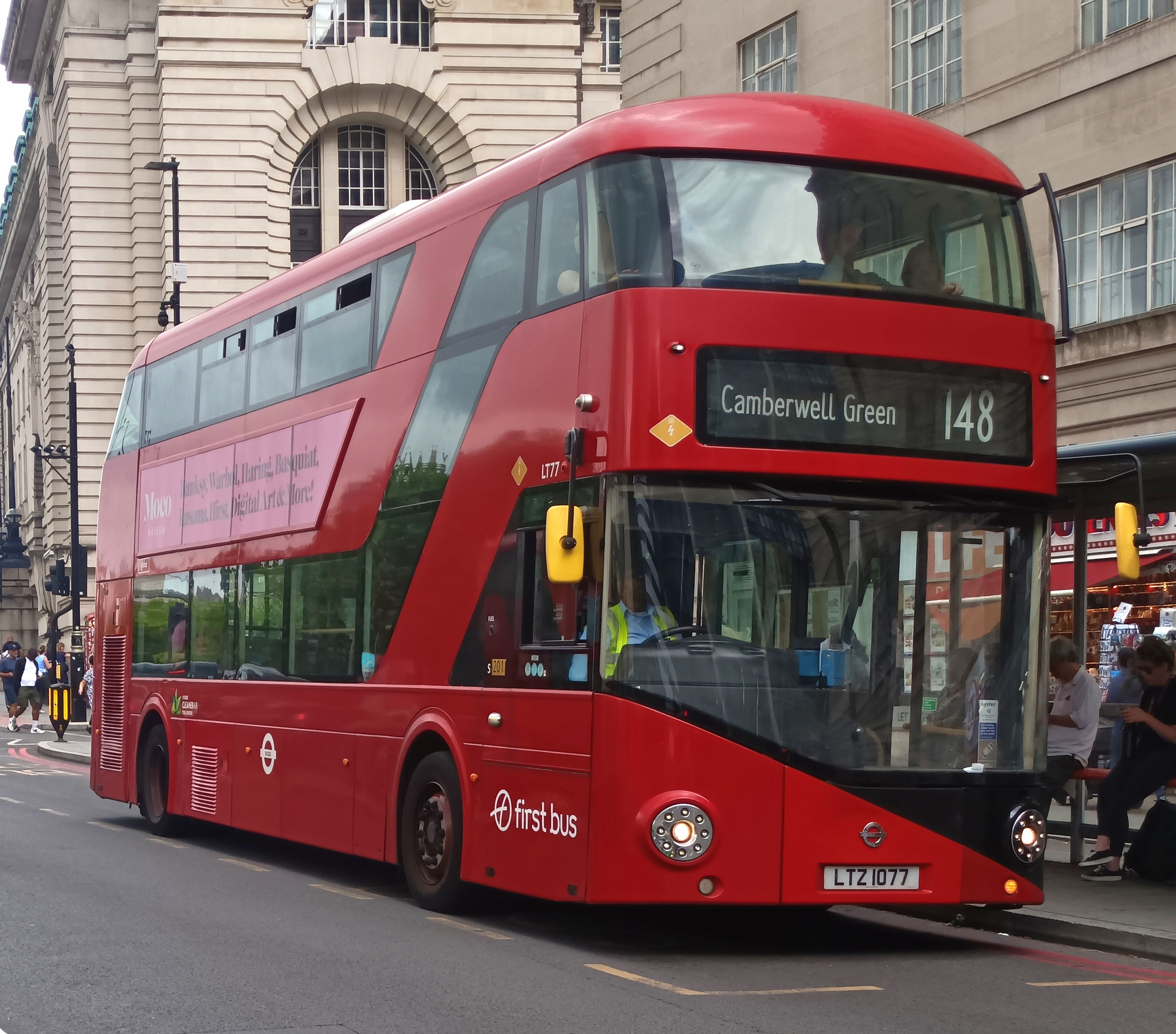
- New Routemaster on route 148 at St Thomas' Hospital in July 2025
- Parent: FirstGroup
- Founded: February 28, 2025; 20 months ago
- Headquarters: London
- Service area: Greater London
- Service type: Bus operator
- Hubs: North-west London; West London; South-west London
- Depots: 9
- Fleet: 1,007 (March 2025)
- Fuel type: Diesel, Hybrid and Electric
- Managing directors: Colin Brown; Bill Cahill
- Website: www.firstbus.co.uk

First Bus London is a bus operator running services across Greater London and parts of Surrey. It is a subsidiary of FirstGroup, operating buses under contract to Transport for London, and was formed with the purchase of RATP Dev Transit London from RATP Group in 2025.

== History ==
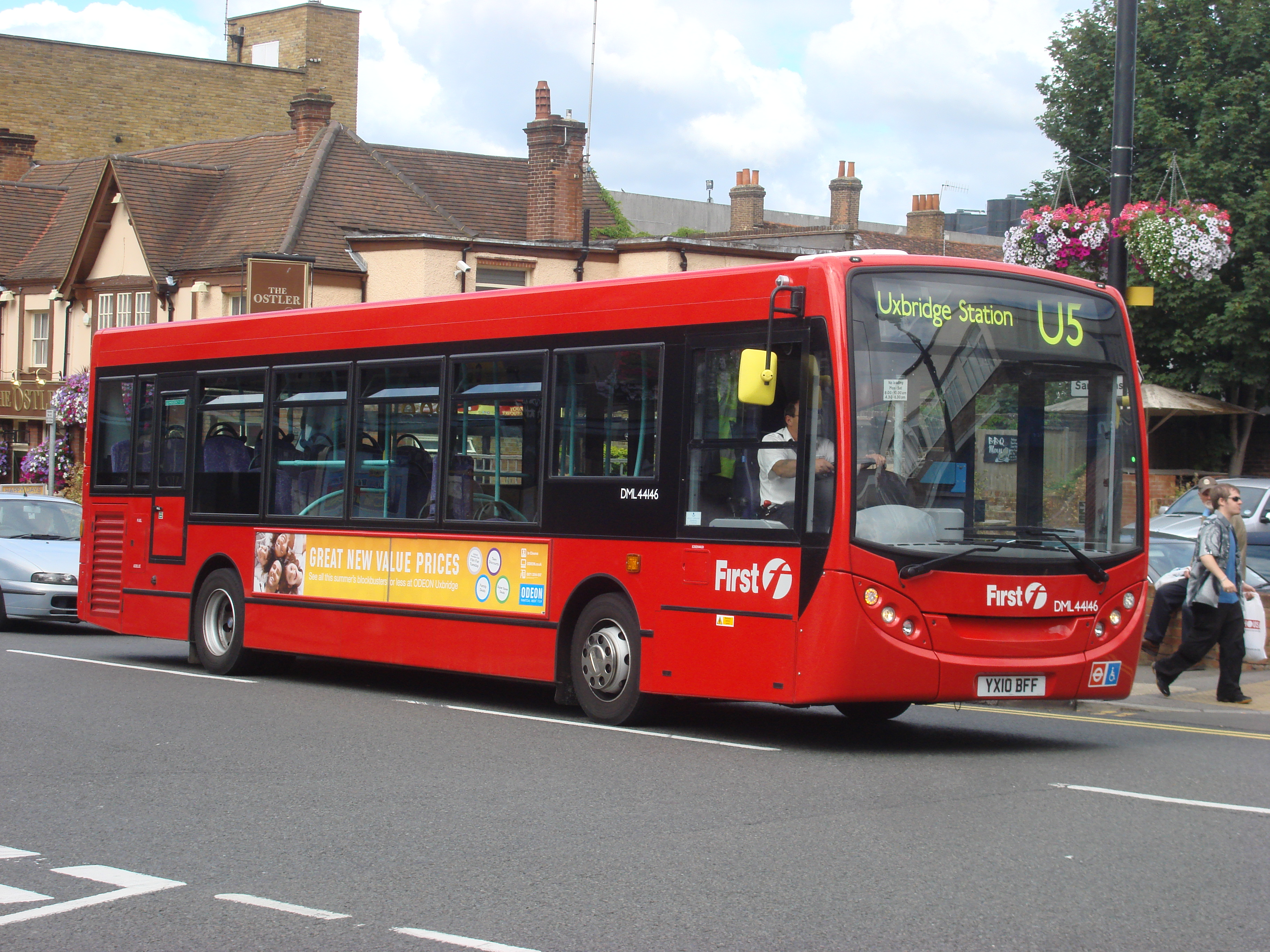
An Alexander Dennis Enviro200 on route U5 in Uxbridge in August 2010 during FirstGroup's prior operation in London as First London

FirstGroup previously operated services under contract to Transport for London, before selling its First London operations to other bus operators, namely Metroline, Go-Ahead London and Tower Transit, in 2013.

In December 2024, FirstGroup agreed terms to purchase RATP Dev Transit London from the RATP Group for £90 million, along with subsidiaries London Sovereign, London Transit and London United, giving the FirstGroup a 12% market share of London's tendered bus services, ten garages across Central and West London (one of which, the Westbourne Park garage, returned to First as the result of acquisition) and a fleet of 982 buses and around 3,700 employees. The deal was completed on 28 February 2025, with FirstGroup subsequently forming a new entity named First Bus London.

== Garages ==
First Bus London operates services under contract to Transport for London. These are operated by 3 subsidiaries which all exist under the First Bus London brand:

- London Sovereign, which has 2 garages in Edgware and Harrow
- London United, which has 6 garages in Fulwell, Hounslow, Hounslow Heath, Shepherd's Bush, Stamford Brook and Tolworth
- London Transit, which has 1 garage in Westbourne Park

=== London Transit ===
==== Westbourne Park (X) ====
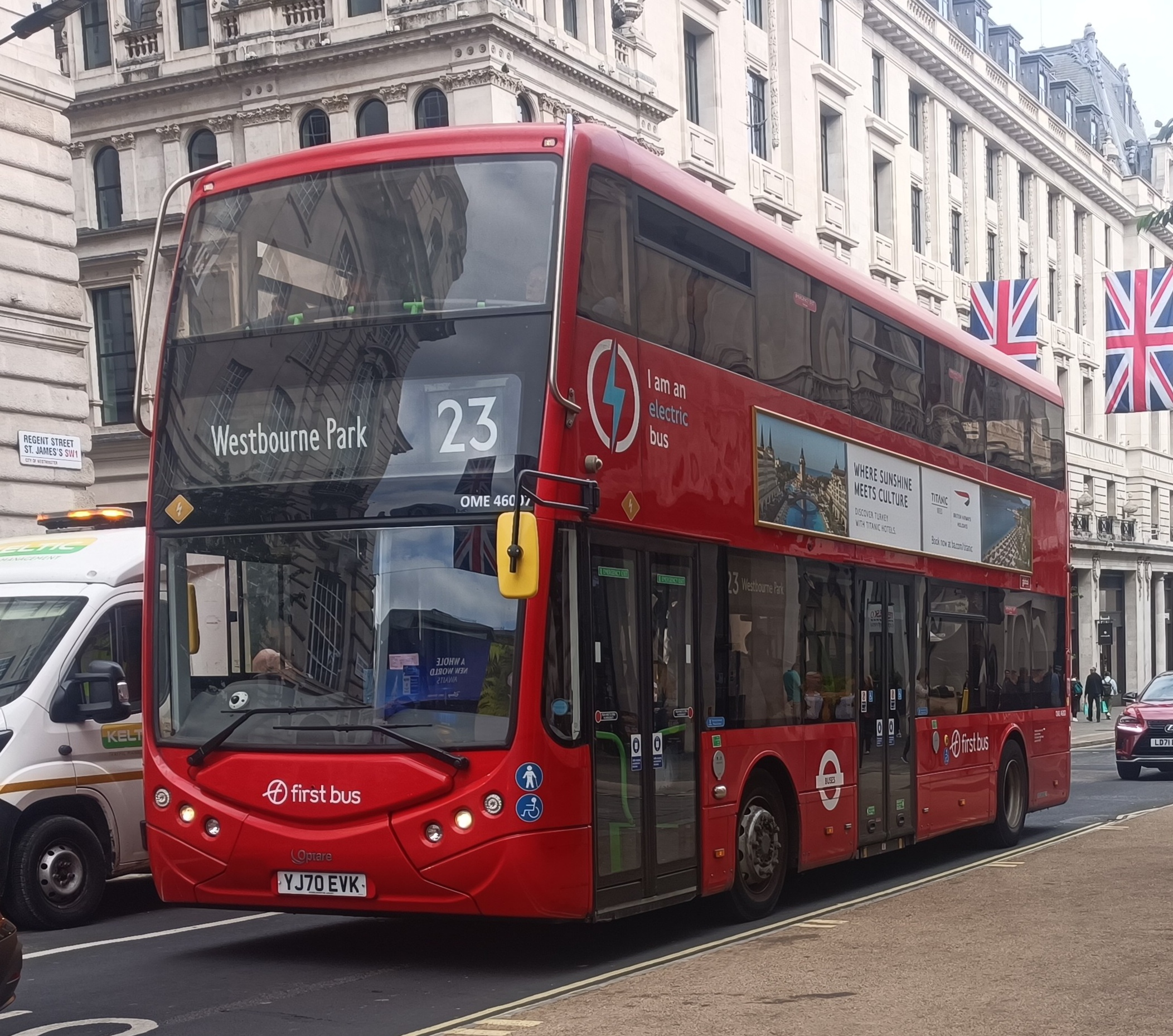
Optare MetroDecker EV on route 23 in Knightsbridge in May 2025

Westbourne Park garage operates routes 13, 18, 23, 31, 218, 295, 452, N18, N31 and N118.

==== History ====
Westbourne Park Garage was part of the re-construction programme undertaken by the London Transport Executive in the early 1980s. As was common practice at the time, the new garage replaced two older garages – the small and inadequate Middle Row (X), and the larger former trolley bus depot at Stonebridge (SE). The new garage, which opened in 1981 on Great Western Road, is of unusual design in that it is built beneath the elevated A40 Westway, the roof of the garage being profiled to match the concrete flyover. Originally, the garage allocation consisted of AEC Routemasters, and a small number of Daimler Fleetlines to B20 "quiet" specification for Route 18. These were supplemented in 1983 by a number of Leyland Titans for comparative trials.

In December 1988, CentreWest launched the Gold Arrow brand for routes 28 and 31 at Westbourne Park. This brand employed 16 seater Alexander bodied Mercedes-Benz 811D midibuses in an initiative by London Regional Transport to increase the frequency of the two routes by 60% at peak times.

When privatised, Westbourne Park operated two routes operated by AEC Routemasters, routes 7 and 23. These were replaced by Dennis Trident 2s in July 2004 and September 2003 respectively. In November 2005, Westbourne Park commenced operating Heritage route 9 with a fleet of restored Routemasters.

On 22 January 2006, an arson attack destroyed seven buses and damaged five others that were parked overnight at Westbourne Park.

In June 2013, Westbourne Park garage was sold to Tower Transit along with all of the buses stationed there. The garage returned to First as part of its acquisition transition from RATP Dev.

== Fleet ==
First Bus London commenced operations with a fleet of 982 buses, most of which were inherited from RATP Dev Transit London. As of March 2025, the First Bus London fleet consisted of 1,007 buses.
