= RATP Dev Transit London =

London bus operator

- Industry: Transport
- Founded: 11 December 2021; 4 years ago
- Defunct: 28 February 2025; 19 months ago
- Fate: Sold to First Bus London
- Headquarters: Stamford Brook garage, London, England
- Owner: RATP Dev
- Number of employees: 3,700 (2024)
- Subsidiaries: London Sovereign; London Transit; London United
- Website: www.ratpdevtransitlondon.com

RATP Dev Transit London was a bus operator owned by RATP Dev in London, England. It owned London Sovereign, London United and London Transit. It commenced on 11 December 2021 as a joint venture between RATP Dev and Kelsian Group. In September 2023, it became a wholly owned RATP Dev subsidiary. In December 2024, RATP Dev agreed terms with FirstGroup to sell the business with First Bus London taking over in February 2025.

== History ==
In September 2021, RATP Dev and Kelsian Group agreed to form a joint venture to combine some of their Transport for London contracted bus operations. RATP held an 87.5% shareholding, with Kelsian owning 12.5%. RATP Dev Transit London commenced with 1,250 buses on 115 routes from 10 garages.

RATP Dev Transit London combined all of RATP's London Sovereign and London United operations, with both retaining their existing brands, while Kelsian's Tower Transit operations out of Westbourne Park garage operate under the London Transit brand. RATP Dev Transit London commenced operations on 11 December 2021.

The RATP Group placed its London operations under review in March 2023 after reporting a €26 million (£23.2 million) loss across the group's operations in 2022, with RATP announcing they were exploring proposals to sell or dilute their shareholding in RATP Dev Transit London. RATP's London operations have been impacted by a bus driver shortage, inflation and strike action resulting in a 10% pay increase compared to the initial 2.3% offered. In September 2023, RATP Dev bought out Kelsian Group's 12.5% shareholding.

In December 2024, FirstGroup agreed terms to purchase the business. The transaction was completed on 28 February 2025.

== London Transit garage ==
=== Westbourne Park (X) ===
Westbourne Park garage operated routes 13, 23, 295 and 452.

== Fleet ==
As at March 2024, the fleet comprised 1,119 buses. Some of them were inherited from Tower Transit.
