= Docklands Buses =

Bus company operating in London, England

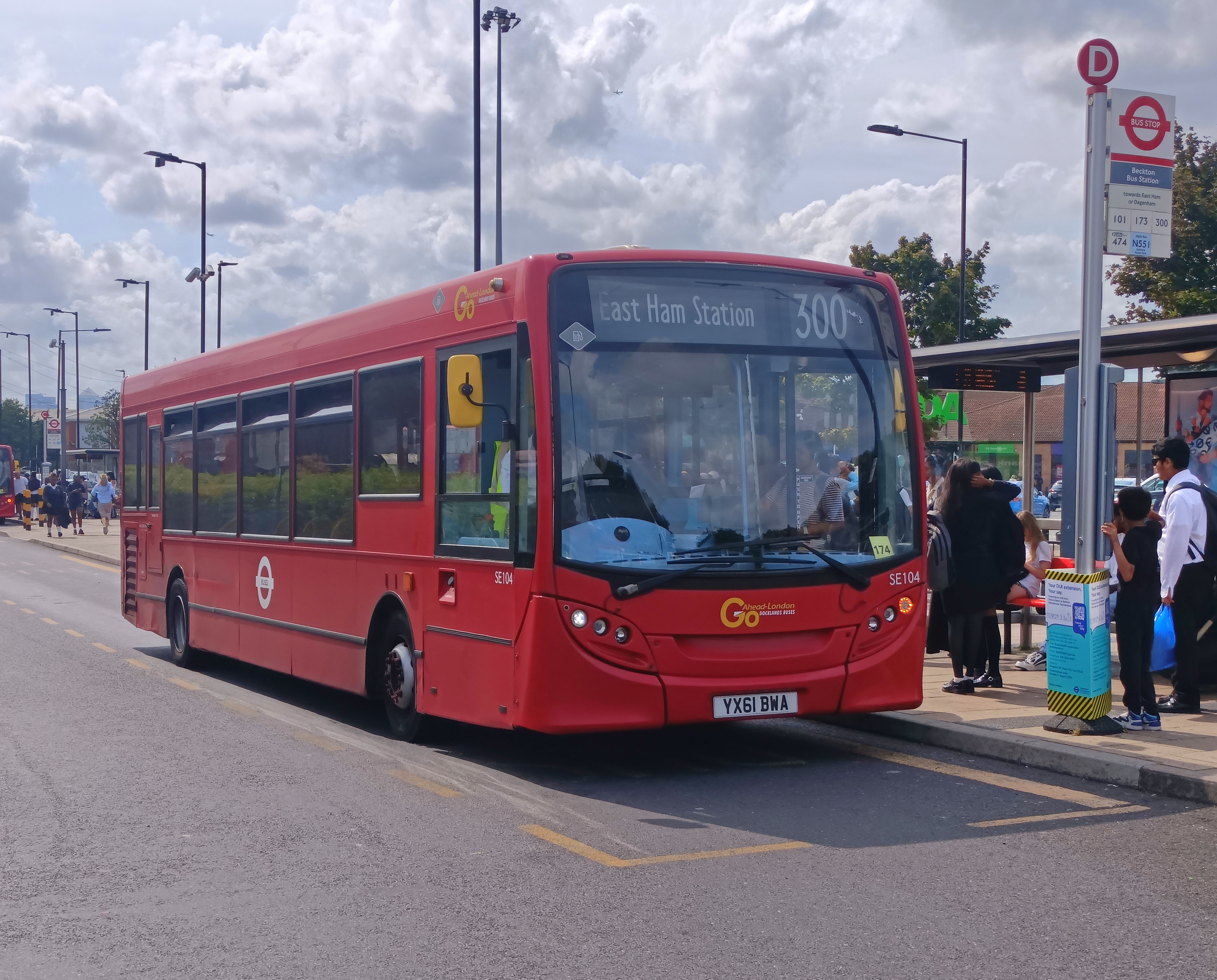
- Alexander Dennis Enviro200 on route 300 at Beckton bus station in July 2025
- Parent: Go-Ahead London
- Founded: 1988
- Headquarters: Merton
- Service area: East London
- Service type: Bus services
- Routes: 6
- Depots: 1
- Fuel type: Diesel
- Website: www.goaheadlondon.com

Docklands Buses is a bus operator brand under London General Transport Services Limited, trading as Go-Ahead London. It operates services in East London under contract to Transport for London.

== History ==
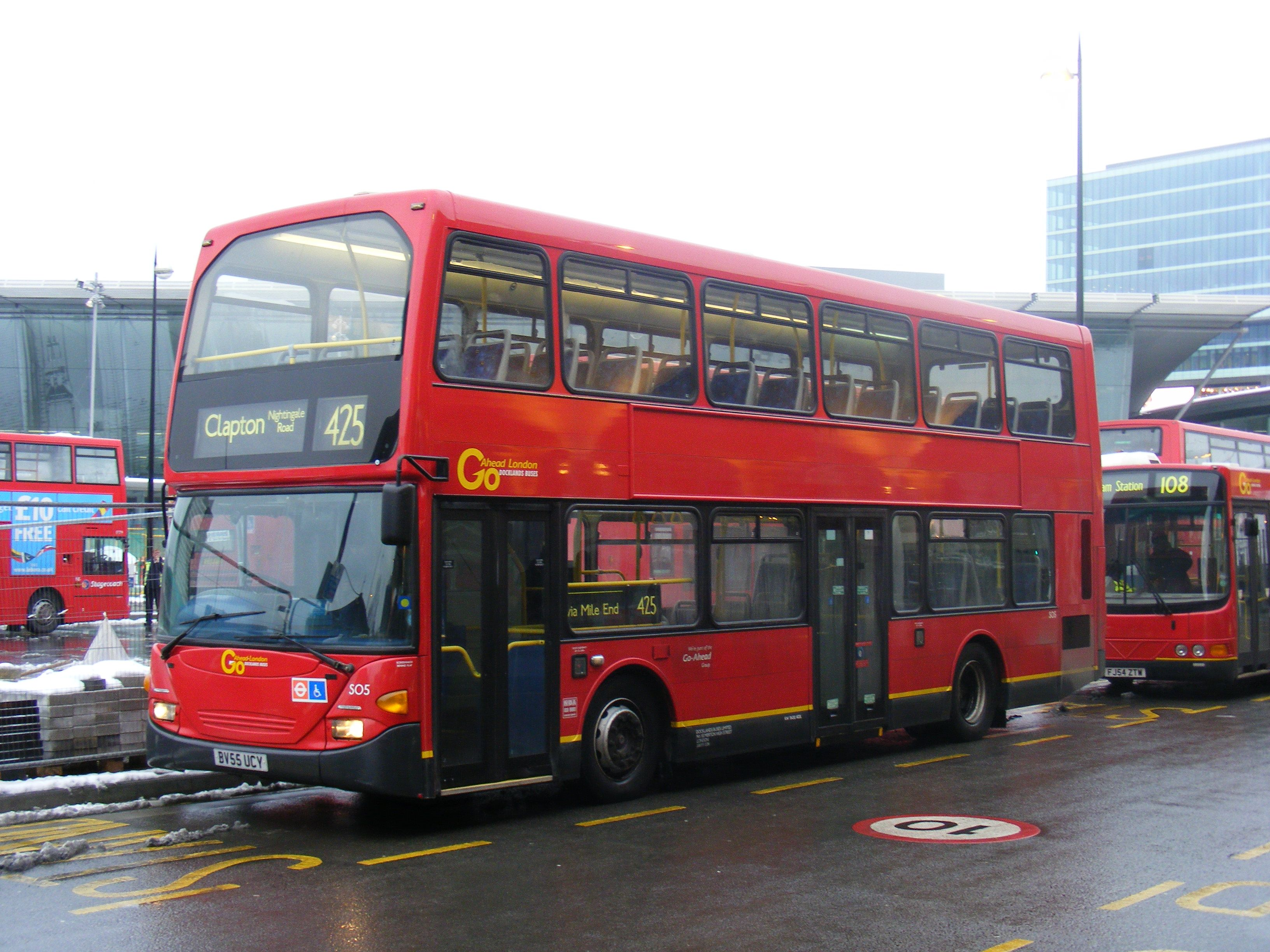
Scania OmniDekka on route 425 at Stratford in February 2012

Docklands Buses was formed by Harry Blundred's Transit Holdings in 1988 as Docklands Transit. It initially operated local commercial routes using Ford Transit minibuses, but these proved not to be viable so it switched to operating tendered Transport for London services. Stagecoach purchased the bus side of the company in 1997, and Docklands Transit continued operating private hire vehicles. In 2002, Docklands Buses commenced operating route 167, soon winning other contracts.

In September 2006 the company was purchased by the Go-Ahead Group. In August 2008, Go-Ahead's London bus operations all adopted the Go-Ahead London trading name, although the individual company names are still applied beneath the logo on most buses.

== Garages ==
=== Silvertown (SI) ===
Silvertown garage operates routes 608, 646, 652, 656, 679 and 686.
