= Hendon (disambiguation) =

Hendon may refer to:

== Places ==
=== Australia ===
- Hendon, Queensland, a town in the Southern Downs Region
- Hendon, South Australia, a suburb of Adelaide

=== Canada ===
- Hendon, Saskatchewan, a hamlet in Canada

=== United Kingdom ===
- Hendon, in the London Borough of Barnet, England
- Hendon Central tube station, in London
- Hendon railway station, a National Rail station in the West of Hendon in London
- Hendon (UK Parliament constituency)
- Hendon Police College, London
- Hendon Aerodrome, London
- Municipal Borough of Hendon, which became part of the London Borough of Barnet in 1965
- Hendon Rural District, an administrative district in Middlesex, England from 1894 to 1934
- Hendon, Sunderland, in Tyne and Wear, England

== People ==
- Bill Hendon, former U.S. Congressman and POW/MIA activist
- Christine P. Hendon, American electrical engineer and computer scientist
- Ian Hendon, English footballer
- Joanna Hendon, American lawyer
- The Hendon Mob, a group of professional poker players
- Hendon Hooker (born 1998), American football player

== Other ==
- Fairey Hendon, a 1930s RAF bomber
- Hendon F.C., a football club from Hendon, England
- Handley Page Hendon, a British torpedo bomber of the 1920s

== See also ==
- Henden (disambiguation)
- Henton (disambiguation)
- Hedon (disambiguation)
