= Wright SRM =

Double-decker bus body on Volvo B5LH chassis

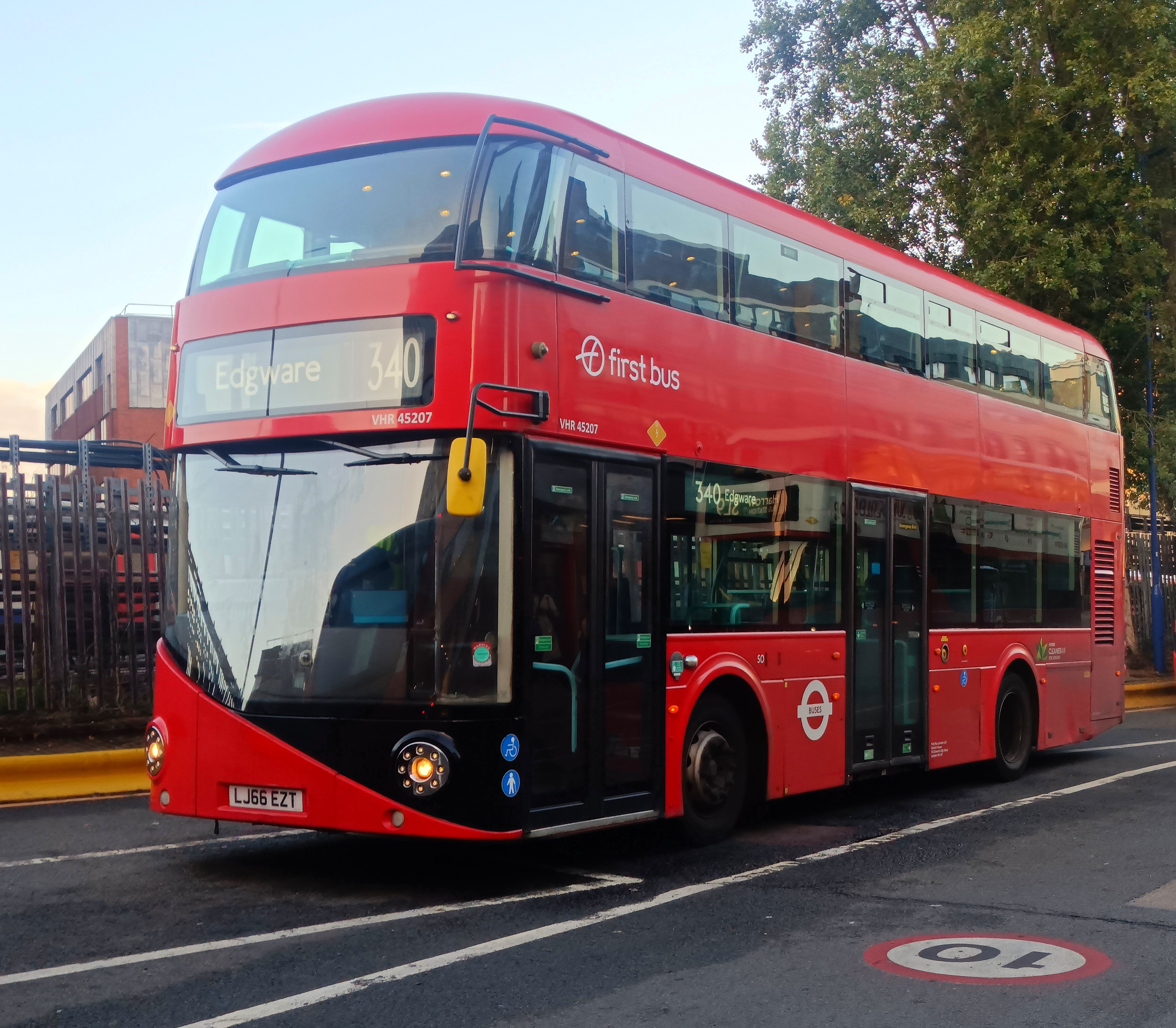
- First Bus London Wright SRM bodied Volvo B5LH at Harrow Bus Station in September 2025

Overview
- Manufacturer: Wrightbus
- Production: 2016
- Assembly: Ballymena, Northern Ireland

Body and chassis
- Doors: 2
- Floor type: Low floor
- Chassis: Volvo B5LH; Volvo B5LHC
- Related: New Routemaster

Powertrain
- Engine: Volvo D5K240
- Transmission: Volvo I-Shift

Dimensions
- Length: 10.6 to 11.3 m (34 ft 9 in to 37 ft 1 in)
- Width: 2.5 m (8 ft 2 in)
- Height: 4.2 m (13 ft 9 in)

The Wright SRM (Son of Routemaster) is a twin-axle double-decker bus body manufactured by Wrightbus in 2016, designed for the Volvo B5LH and Volvo B5LHC hybrid chassis.

The design is based on the New Routemaster, sharing the majority of body panels up to the rear quarter section but having no second staircase or third door. It was designed with provincial bus operators in mind, rather than being exclusively for bus operators in London. Despite this, all those produced have only been used in London.

== Design ==
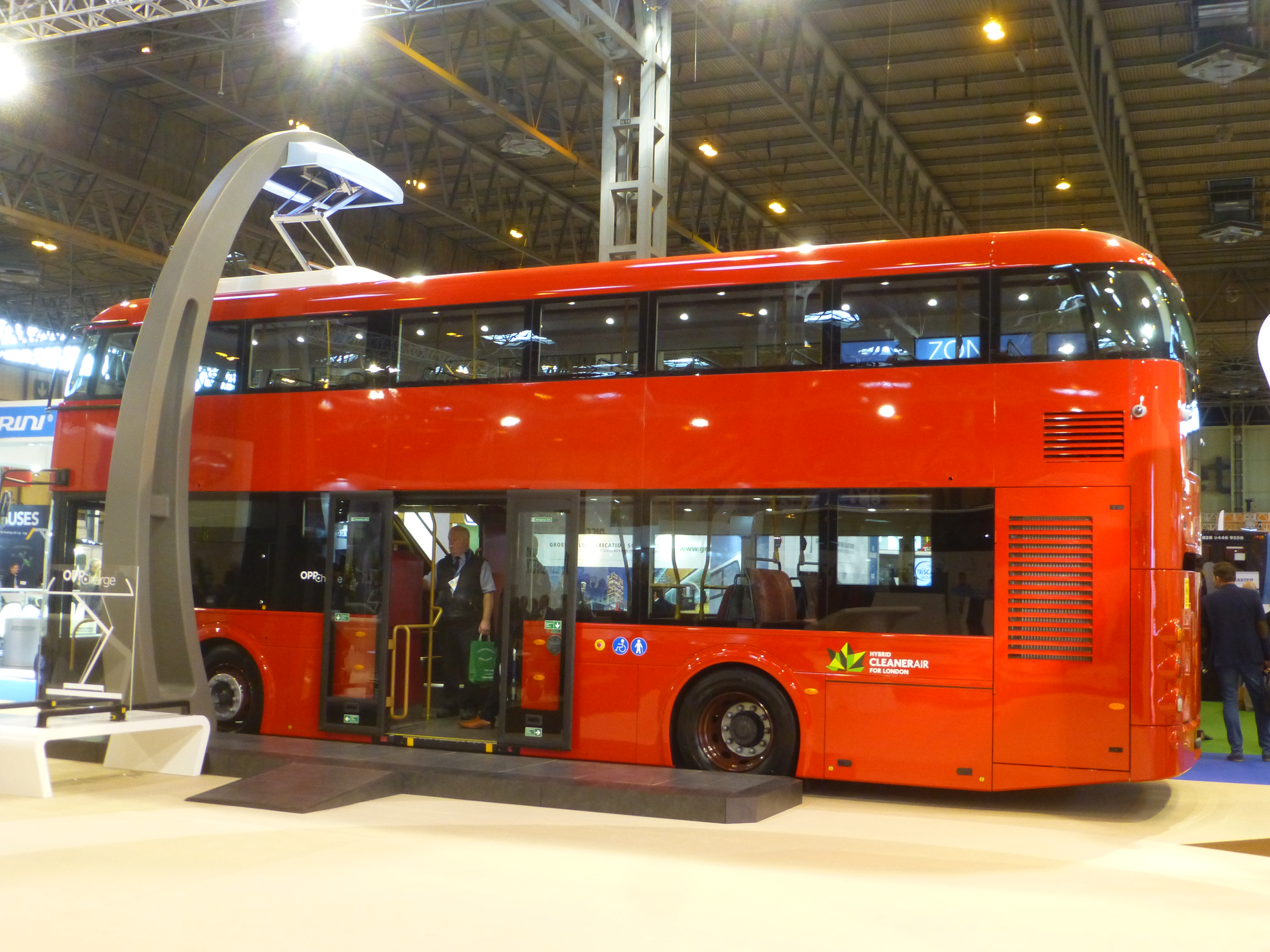
A Wright SRM at the Euro Bus Expo in 2016

The Wright SRM is styled like the New Routemaster with a tall wrap-around windscreen, an upper deck double-curvature windscreen and an arched roof - however Transport for London (TfL) have had no involvement with designing the Wright SRM.

== Orders ==
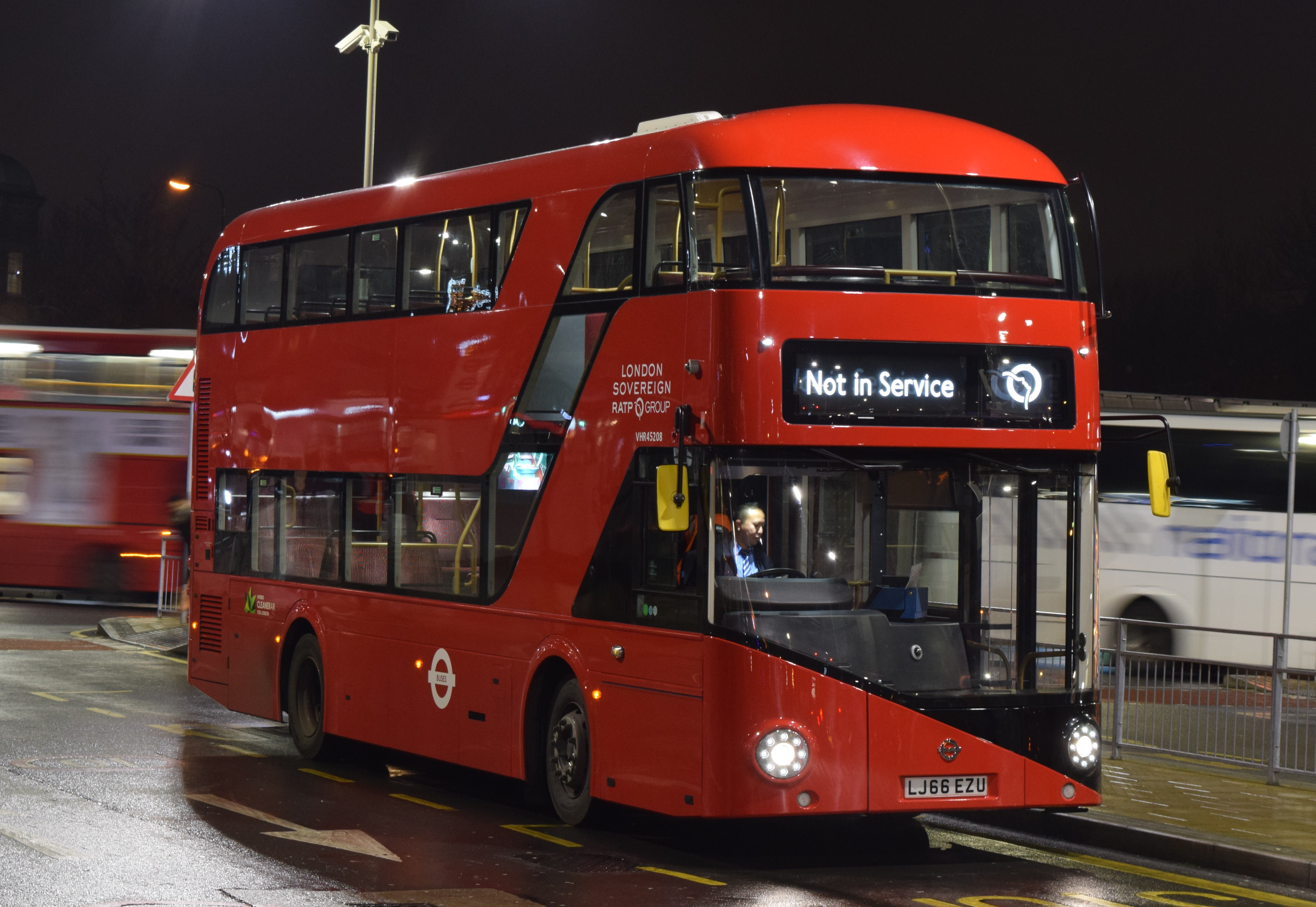
London Sovereign Wright SRM bodied Volvo B5LH at Golders Green station in December 2016

The first six Volvo B5LHs entered service with London Sovereign on route 13 in September 2016. They were transferred to route 183 in April 2017 owing to a boarding problem.

A further two were completed to TfL specification on Volvo B5LHC chassis in 2016, featuring roof-mounted pantograph chargers that can charge the B5LHC's batteries when attached to Volvo 'OppCharge' opportunity charging gantries. One was retained by Volvo Buses in Sweden for further trials before being delivered to London; both commenced trial service with London Central on route 37 in 2018, however they entered service on the 37 as hybrid electric buses after TfL abandoned plans to install opportunity charging gantries at the 37's termini at Peckham bus station and Putney Heath, stating there was insufficient space at both.

The only SRMs produced were built in 2016, at the time of the model's launch. The model remained available for order right up until Wrightbus entered administration in 2019, although no further examples were built.
