= Transdev London =

Transdev London formerly owned the following London Buses operators:

- London Sovereign
- London United Busways
