= Heddon =

Heddon may refer to:

- Heddon (brand), a brand of fishing lures
- Heddon, Devon, a hamlet in England
- Heddon (surname)
- Heddon-on-the-Wall, a village in Northumberland, England
- River Heddon, a river in Devon, England
- Black Heddon, a village in Northumberland, England
- Heddon Greta, New South Wales, a suburb of the Cessnock LGA, Australia
- Heddon's Mouth, a rocky cove on the coast of North Devon, Devon, England

== See also ==
- Hedon (disambiguation)
- Hendon (disambiguation)
