= Hepton =

Hepton is a surname. Notable people with the surname include:

- Bernard Hepton (1925–2018), English theatre director and actor
- Stan Hepton (1932–2017), English footballer

== See also ==
- Henton (surname)
- Hepton Rural District, former rural district in the West Riding of Yorkshire, England
