= London Buses route SL10 =

London Superloop express bus route

SL10
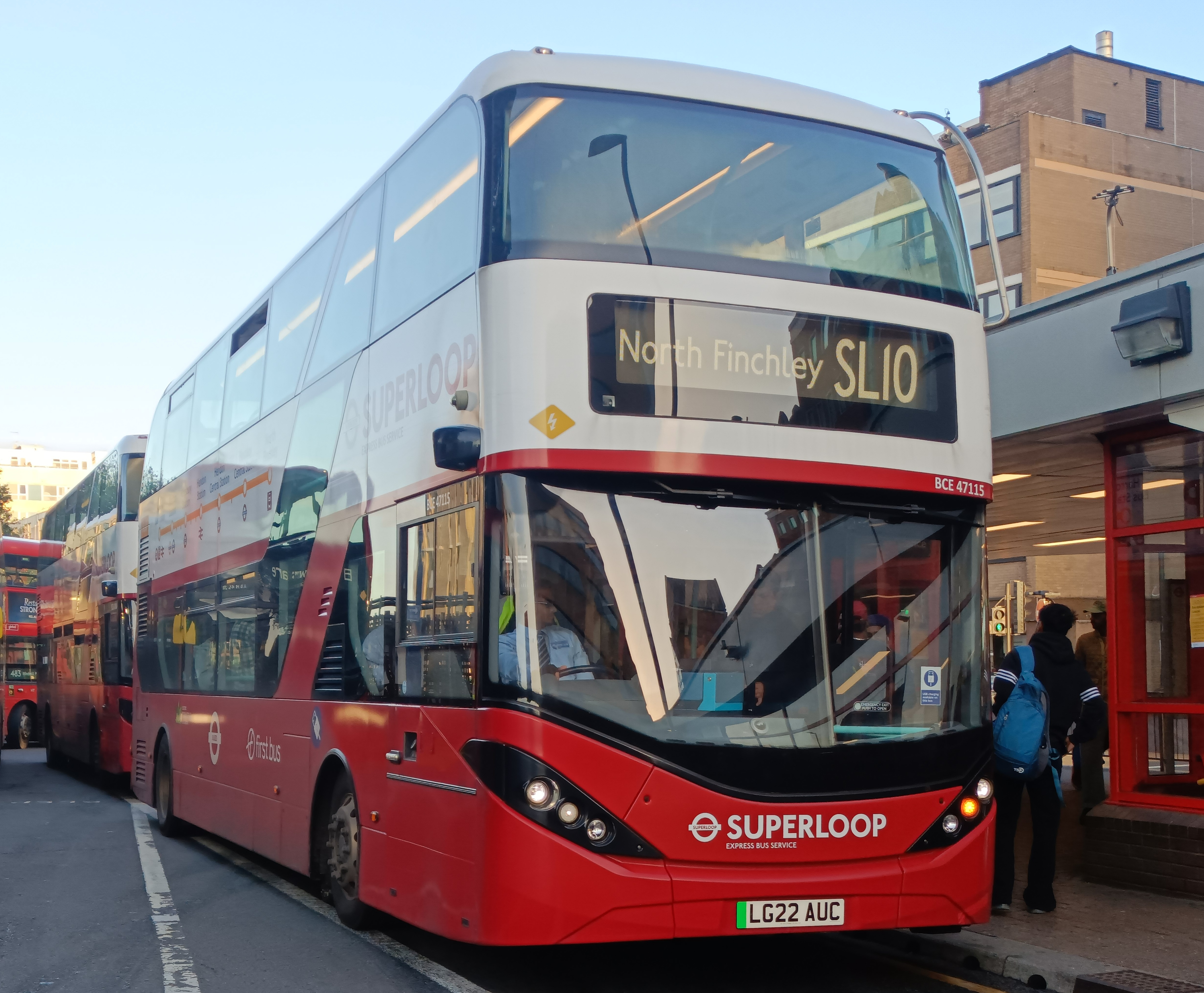
- London Sovereign BYD Alexander Dennis Enviro400EV at Harrow bus station in September 2025

Overview
- Operator: London Sovereign (First Bus London)
- Garage: Harrow
- Vehicle: BYD Alexander Dennis Enviro400EV
- Began service: 25 November 2023

Route
- Start: Harrow bus station
- Via: Kenton; Kingsbury; Hendon; Finchley
- End: North Finchley bus station
- Length: 9 miles (14 km)

Service
- Level: Daily
- Frequency: Every 12-15 minutes
- Journey time: 31-59 minutes
- Operates: 05:00 until 01:19

London Buses route SL10 is a Transport for London contracted Superloop express bus route in London, England. Running between Harrow and North Finchley bus stations, it is operated by First Bus London subsidiary London Sovereign.

== History ==
The route was first proposed by Transport for London in April 2023 as the first proposed new route in the Superloop express bus network. At the time of the consultation, the route was proposed to be numbered X183.

The route was renumbered from X183 to SL10 before it was introduced. Route SL10 was introduced on 25 November 2023. It is operated by London Sovereign as a variation to its route 183 contract that it parallels between Hendon and Harrow.

On 28 February 2025, the route passed from London Sovereign to First Bus London following the acquisition of RATP Dev Transit London by FirstGroup.

== Current route ==
Route SL10 operates via these primary locations:

- Harrow bus station for Harrow-on-the-Hill station
- Kenton station
- Kingsbury station
- Hendon station
- Hendon Central station
- Finchley Central station
- North Finchley bus station

== Operation ==
The route operates at a frequency of a bus every 12 minutes on weekdays and Saturdays and a bus every 15 minutes on Sundays.
