= West Hendon =

District of Hendon, London, England

Coordinates: 51.578°N 0.240°W

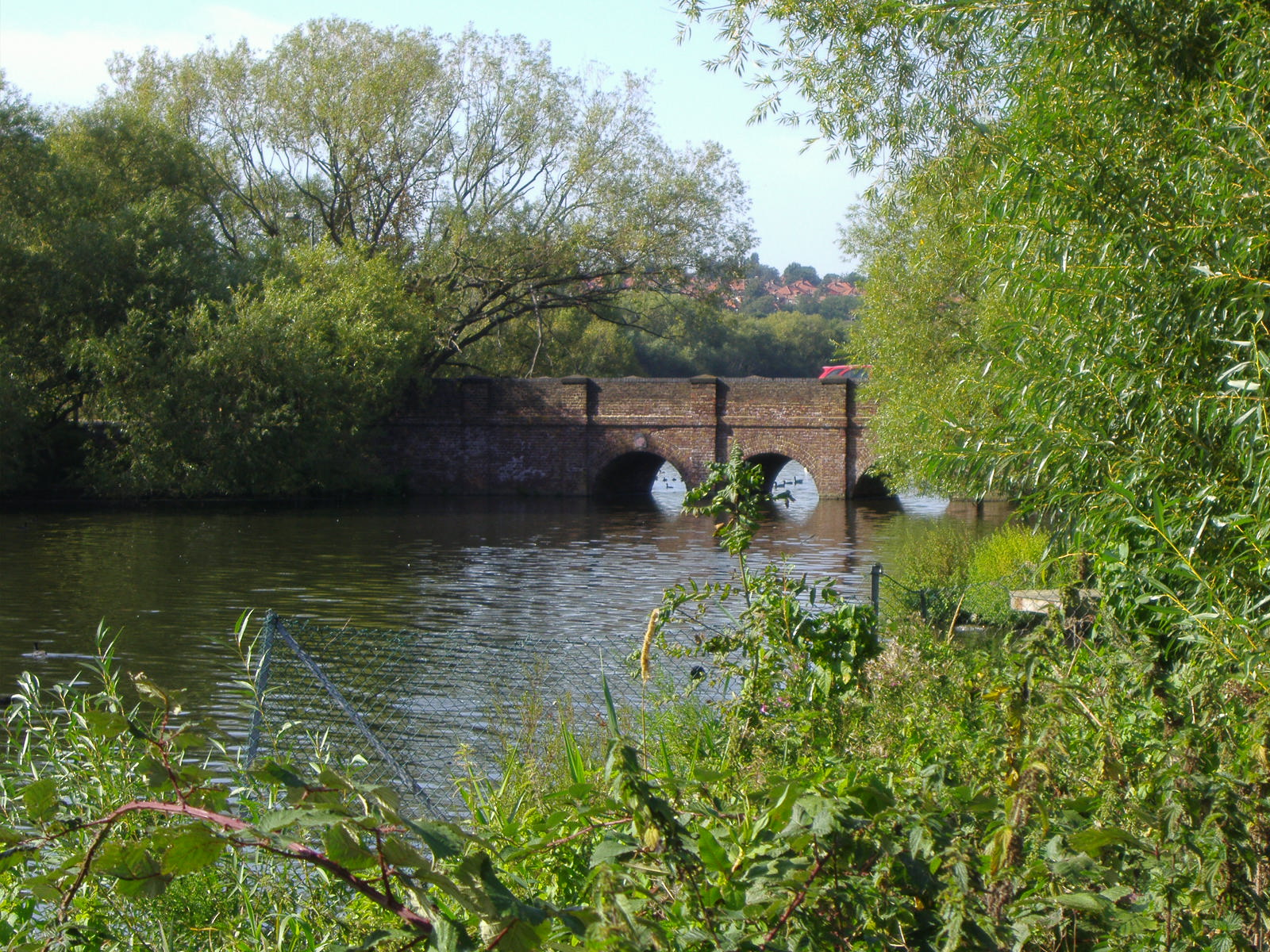
- Cool Oak Bridge, crossing the Welsh Harp in West Hendon

- Location within Greater London
- Population: 17,402 (2011 Census. Ward)
- OS grid reference: TQ215885
- London borough: Barnet
- Ceremonial county: Greater London
- Region: London
- Country: England
- Sovereign state: United Kingdom
- Post town: LONDON
- Postcode district: NW9, NW4
- Dialling code: 020
- Police: Metropolitan
- Fire: London
- Ambulance: London
- UK Parliament: Hendon
- London Assembly: Barnet and Camden

West Hendon is a district of Hendon in North London, in the London Borough of Barnet. It is the NW9 part of Hendon, located around the A5 Edgware Road and the Welsh Harp (Brent Reservoir). The area is known for the West Hendon Estate which is undergoing controversial regeneration.

== History ==
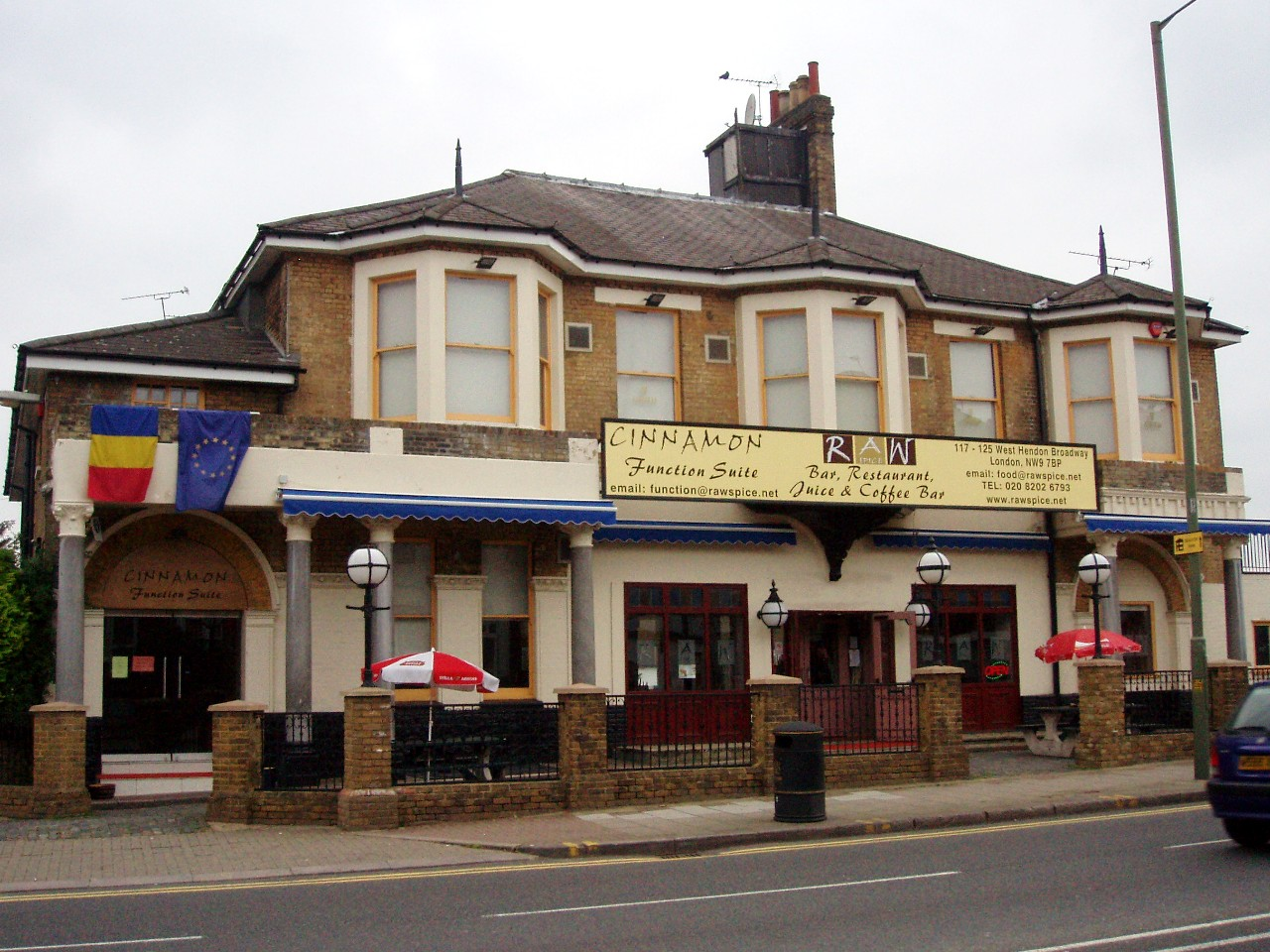
The old Upper Welsh Harp (shown here as Raw Spice), one of two pubs that gave the reservoir its nickname

West Hendon was a settlement within that part of the ancient parish of Hendon known as the Hyde. It was formally known, from 1878 to 1890, as New Hendon, a small railway development on the Edgware Road. Before the 1830s there were three farms, Upper and Lower Guttershedge (east of the road) and Cockman's in the Wood (west of the road) and an inn, The Welsh Harp. Between 1835 and 1838, the Brent Reservoir was constructed by damming the Brent and the Silk brooks and flooding much of Cockman's Farm. The water was used to supply the Grand Union Canal. At its greatest extent, in 1853, it covered 400 acres (1.6 km^{2}) but was dramatically reduced to 195 acres (789,000 m^{2}) in the 1890s. Subsequently, it has been reduced to 110 acres (445,000 m^{2}). It contains enough water to fill 3 million baths and in 1991 was believed to contain 10,000 lb (4,500 kg) of fish. The residue of Cockman's Farm became Woodfield House, home to the Roman Catholic Passioist Fathers (1852 and 1858). The house was demolished in 1940 and the site used by the Borough of Hendon and its successor the London Borough of Barnet as a plant nursery.

Originally The Harp and Horn (c. 1750s), The Harp was rebuilt in 1859 and again in 1937, before finally being pulled down in 1970 to make way for the M1. During the 1960s, it was known as The Lakeside Scene and hosted some of the great rock and blues bands of the day, such as the Yardbirds. From 1859 until the end of the century it was run by the Warner brothers, and the reservoir became a centre for all sorts of sporting events such as ice skating, swimming and angling; it was, until 1878, the Kingsbury Race Course and the first mechanical hare in greyhound racing was used there in 1876. By 1850, there was a second public house, the Upper Welsh Harp. At its height in the mid-1880s crowds in excess of 25,000 people could be expected on a Bank Holiday weekend.

=== Development ===
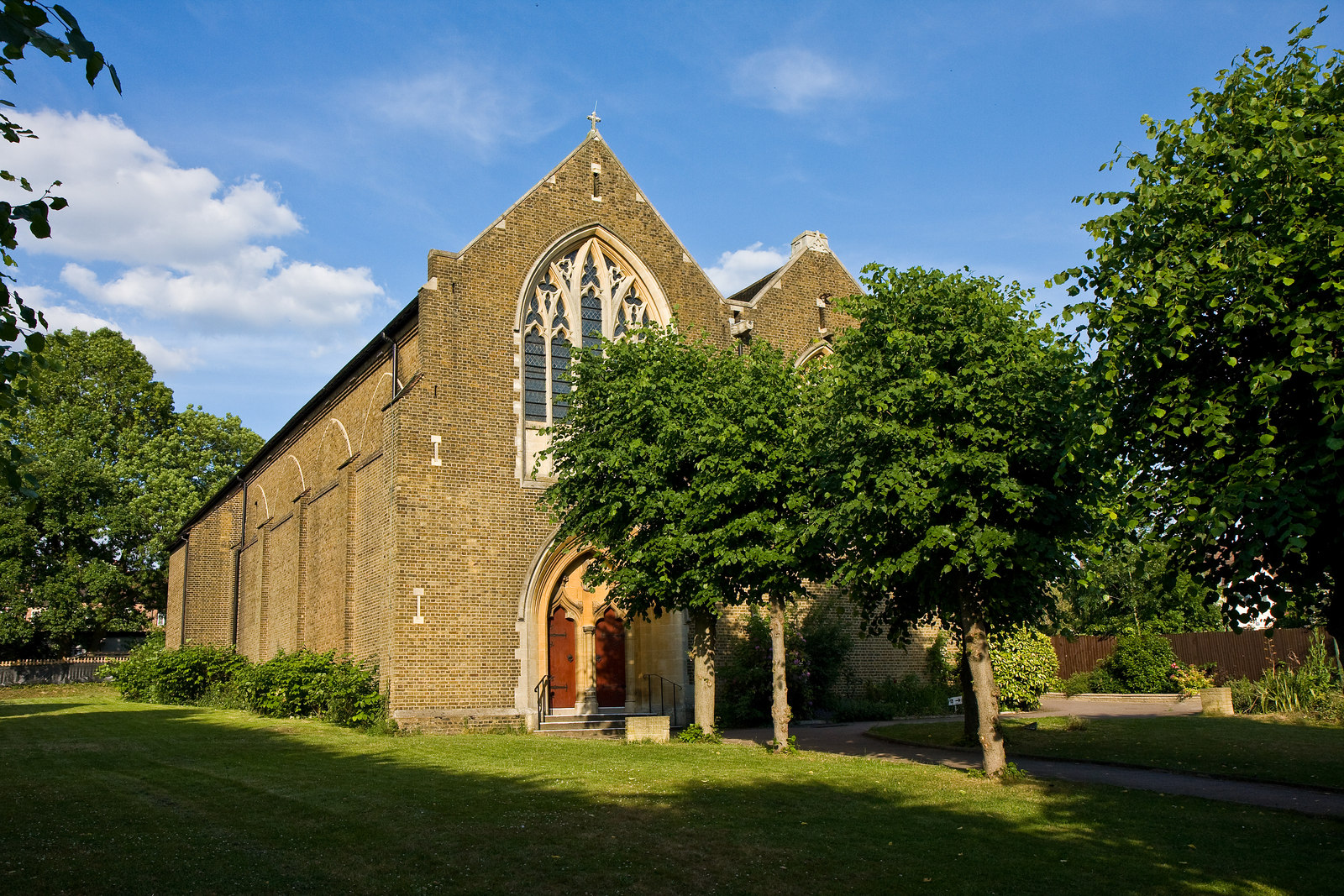
St John the Evangelist

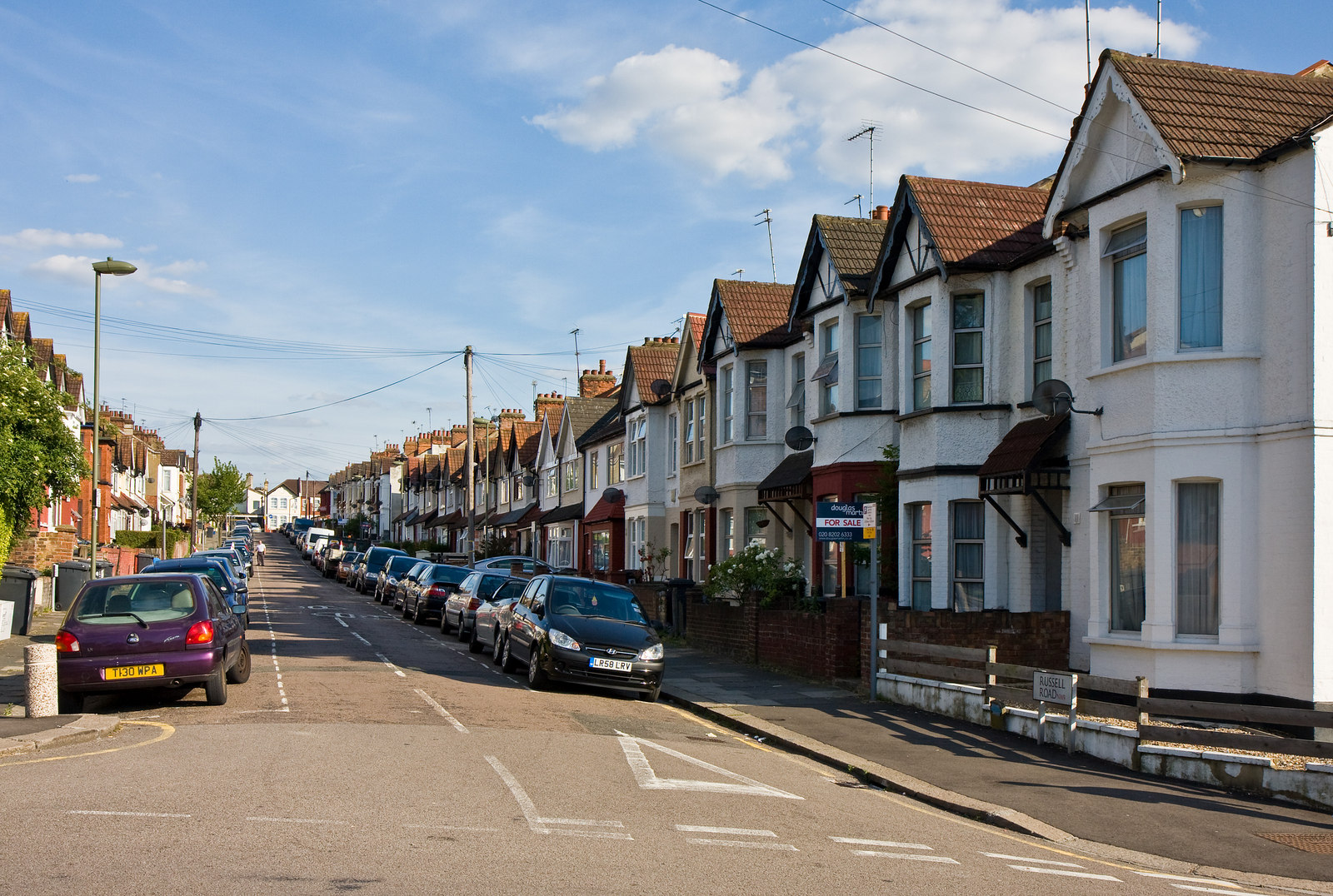
Victorian housing in West Hendon (Russell Road)

Two railway stations were opened, both of the Midland Railway: Hendon (1868), and Welsh Harp (1870). The latter was only 600 yards south of Hendon station and built for leisure traffic for the reservoir; it closed down by 1903 and the station building remained until the 1970s. A local builder called Bishop laid the first brick of a new terrace called Neeld Terrace (1881), which heralded the start of New Hendon. Brent Vue was built on land originally owned by the Midland Company. In 1885, the Baptists had a mission hall and their present hall was opened in 1930. By 1886, there were 200 new houses and the Anglican church of St. John's was built. It became part of the Municipal Borough of Hendon in 1894.

The 1896 Ordnance Survey Map shows that most of the roads had been laid out, but with little further development beyond that of the mid-1880s. In 1896 Schweppes opened a large mineral water factory, and the present Anglican church of St. John's was established in Algernon Road. With a planned tram line along the West Hendon Broadway due to open in 1904 and run by Metropolitan Electric Tramways, Welsh Harp station was closed in 1903, and West Hendon became a thriving Edwardian retail district until overshadowed by Golders Green. The Ordnance Survey Map of 1913 shows the area as being fully developed.

The reservoir was an important centre for speedboat racing in the 1920s and 1930s. C Harrison broke the outboard motorboat record at 57 mph (92 km/h) in 1931.

=== War bombing and post-war period ===
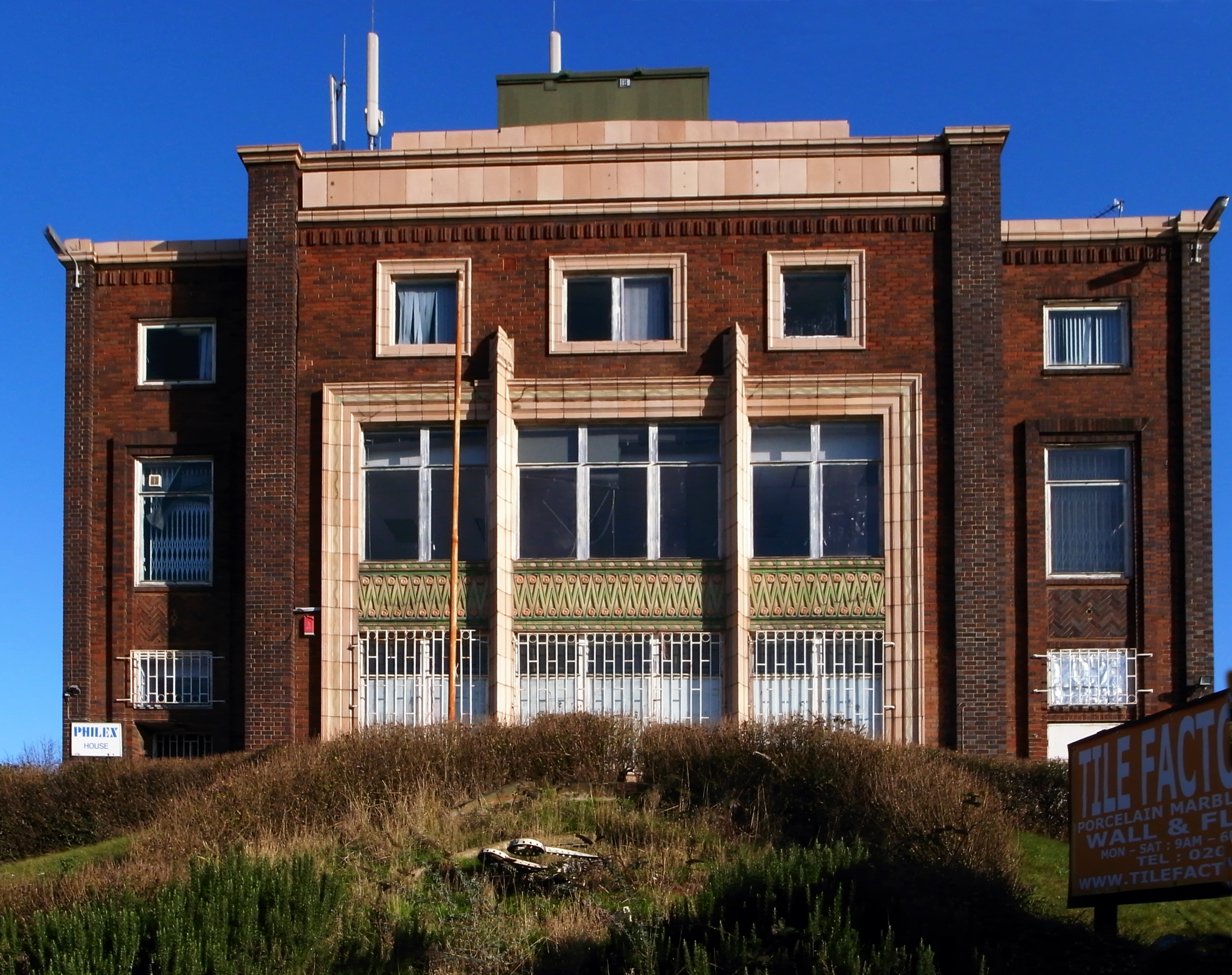
Philex House

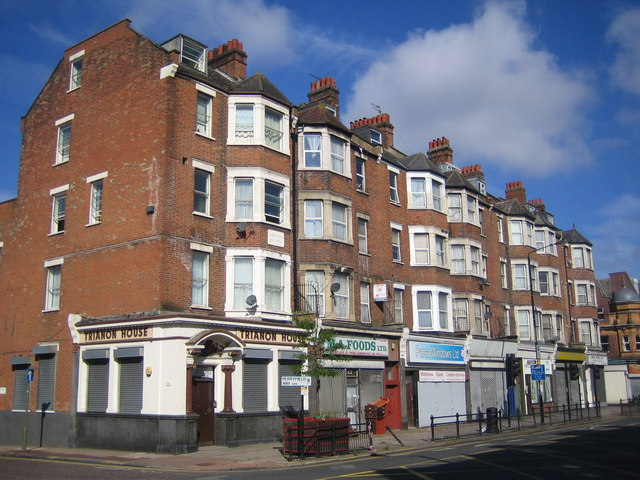
St John's Parade on the broadway, demolished as part of the regeneration

During World War II, on 13 February 1941, the Luftwaffe dropped a single SC2500 maximum heavy explosive bomb (equivalent to two V2 rockets), killing 85 people, injuring hundreds, destroying 40 houses in an area west of the Edgware Road and making over one thousand locals homeless. The devastated area here was redeveloped by the 1970s. A memorial plaque was laid at a green space (York Memorial Park) in the 1960s where smashed houses once stood. During a very hot summer in the 1960s, the water levels fell dramatically and remains of some of the destroyed houses could be seen.

In 1964, St Patrick's Roman Catholic church was formed at 167 the Broadway. In 1984 a small Islamic Centre was established at 135 the Broadway; it was later moved to Brent View Road and reopened as Hendon Mosque on 23 August 1996. Hendon Mosque notably held the funeral for Nazia Hassan, a pioneer of Pakistani pop music, in 2001.

No. 110 West Hendon Broadway was built in the 1930s as an attractive building with a floral clock in its front garden. Originally used for a local car parts business, the building was seemingly used as UK headquarters for the Free German Trade Union Federation from the 1970s to 1990. It was rumoured among local people that the building was an East German espionage base. The building was later used by various hardware distributors but is now derelict.

The Upper Welsh Harp public house was demolished in 2017 despite local residents campaigning against it. The building failed to get listed by English Heritage. A five-storey block of flats was built on the site.

=== Estate regeneration ===
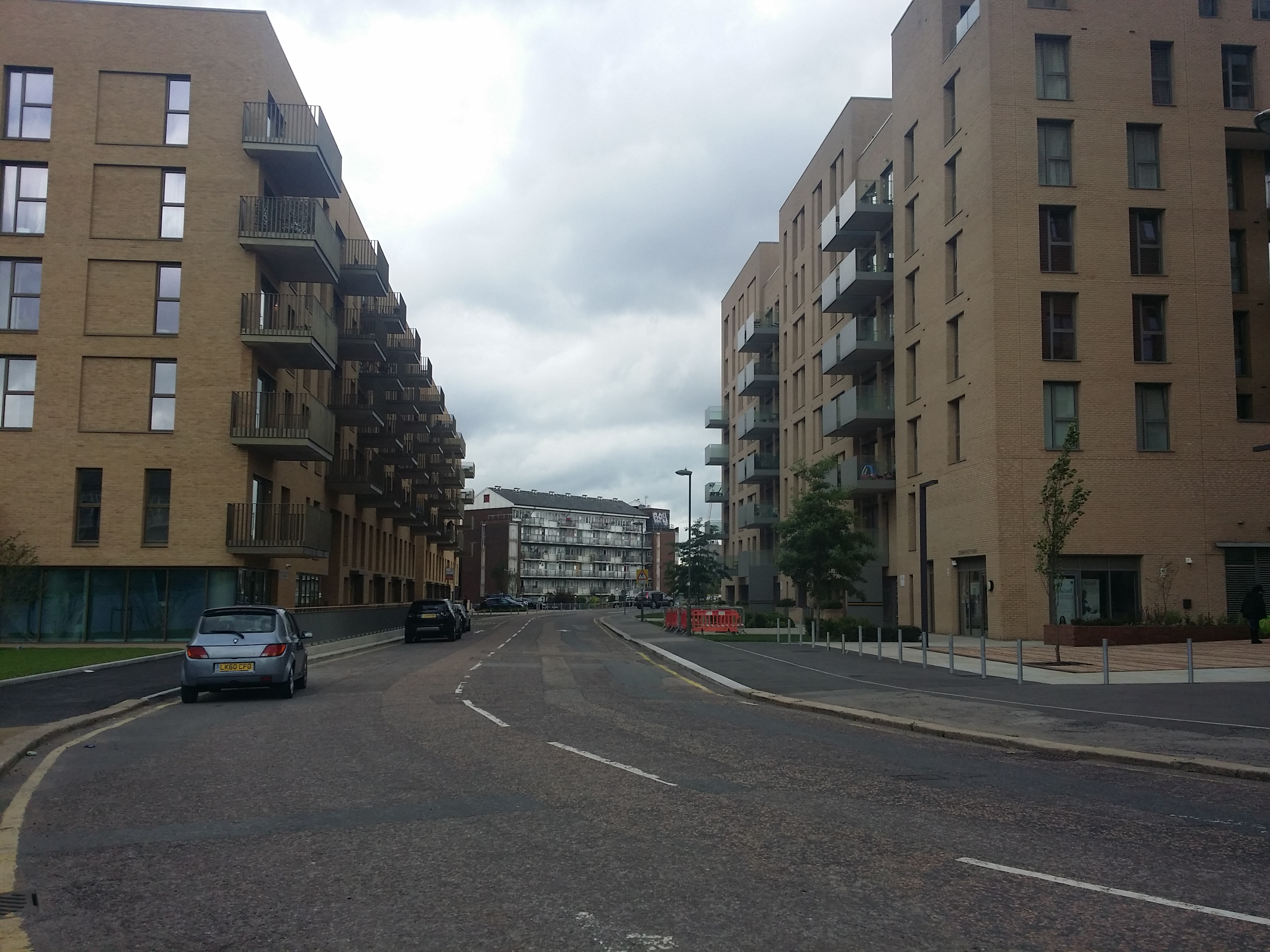
Two new build flats of the estate, along with an older build in the background

The West Hendon Estate was built in the late 1960s, originally made up of 680 homes. Plans were made during the 2000s to regenerate the estate, which were eventually approved in 2013. As of 2019, Marsh Drive is the only remaining original block yet to be demolished which is expected in 2022. This block has apparently been neglected by the council. The new development is collectively named Hendon Waterside.

The most prominent building of the new development is Hawfinch House, a high rise 26 storey tower that is 85 metres (279 ft) tall, completed in July 2016. It became the tallest building in the borough of Barnet.

The regeneration has been controversial and has caused backlash from both residents and MPs. Barnet London Borough Council has faced criticism for its regeneration of the West Hendon Estate, including the use of compulsory purchase. It was claimed that 400 families would be forced to move off the estate. During 2014, residents protested against the plans and blocked the entrance to the estate. In 2018, Jeremy Corbyn and Mayor Sadiq Khan visited residents in the estate and were told of having been let down by Barnet council. The estate has been featured on the BBC's Victoria Derbyshire show, which found that the Marsh Drive block was in poor condition. In 2016 the BBC filmed a documentary called The Estate We're In for BBC One that followed tenants and homeowners of the estate who were against the regeneration.

Another controversy was the loss of York Park open space, behind the estate. Residents saw the park as a memorial for the victims of the 1941 Luftwaffe bombing. Barnet stated in its regeneration plan in 2008 that the park would be retained, however this changed later on and the park was sold to the developers for the building of blocks.

== Demography and community ==
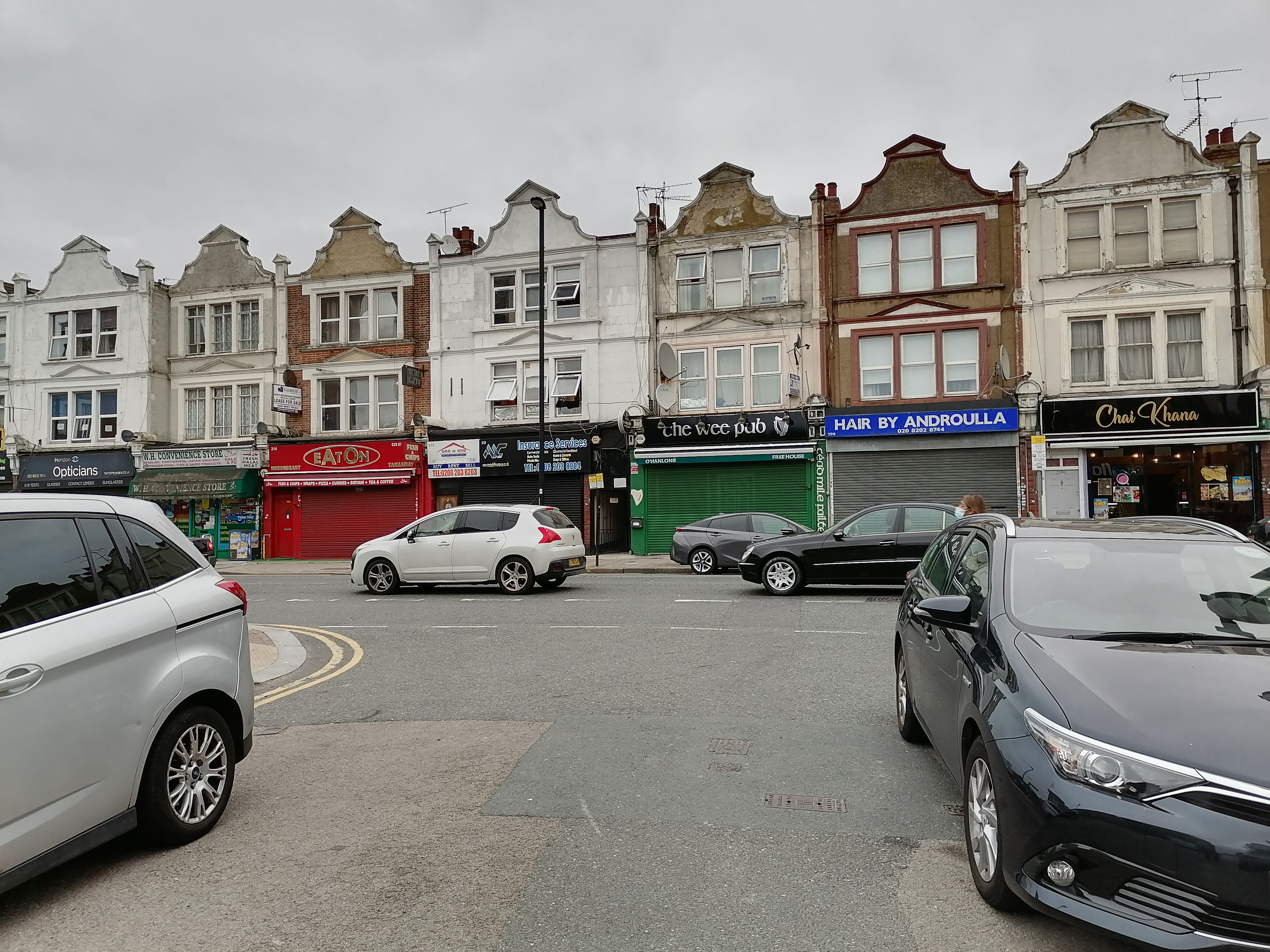
Shops on West Hendon Broadway

West Hendon is a more socially deprived part of Hendon and the borough of Barnet.

It has a range of cultures including from Somali, Afghan and West African communities; 50.6% of West Hendon ward's population was of BAME background in the 2011 census (thus differing from Hendon). Religiously, 36% were Christian, 17% Muslim, 14% Jewish, 11% Hindu and 11% irreligious. The largest foreign languages are Polish and Gujarati, both numbering over 800 people each. 49% of the population was white (27% British, 20% Other), 32% was Asian (15% Indian, 9% Other, 4% Chinese), and 9% was black (7% African).

The West Hendon Community Hub provides local events and is home to a children's centre. Numerous community groups exist including the West Hendon Allotment Society, West Hendon Residents' Association, Friends of York Park, Woolmead Residents' Association, Welsh Harp Conservation Group and Welsh Harp Sailing Association.

== Geography and locale ==
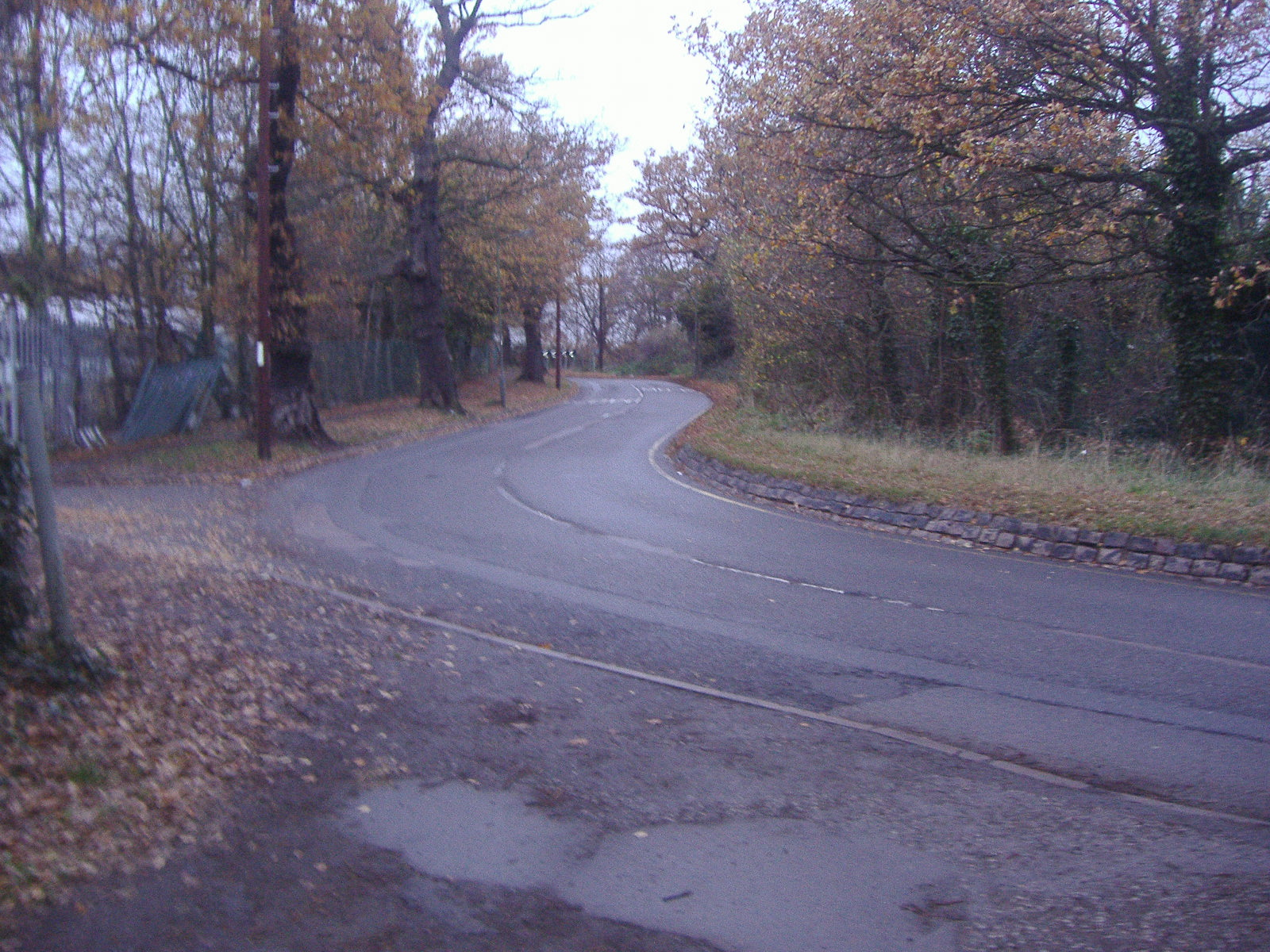
Cool Oak Lane

West Hendon lies to the west and south-west of Hendon, and lies 7 miles north-west of London's Charing Cross. It is about 40 metres (130 ft) to 60 metres (200 ft) above sea level, lower than the rest of Hendon to its east. The Silk Stream, a tributary of the River Brent, marks its northern boundary with The Hyde, a small loose area bordering Kingsbury and Colindale. The Silk Bridge on the A5 crosses the stream to the Hyde, across which is a retail park, a Sainsbury's supermarket and Hendon Magistrates' Court.

Cool Oak Lane is a narrow road that crosses the Welsh Harp through a bridge, and travels west for half a mile before reaching Wood Lane in the Fryent residential area of Kingsbury. Cool Oak Lane is notably one of the nearest country lanes from the centre of London. The area around here consists of woodlands and allotments. The bridge on this lane is Grade II listed and was built at the time of the Brent's damming in c. 1835; an older bridge once existed at this site before.

The Capital Ring flows through West Hendon. From the west it reaches the area from Woodfield Park next to the reservoir, crosses the bridge on Cool Oak Lane, and travels eastwards through Park Road towards Hendon Park and Brent Park in Hendon. In addition, Cool Oak Lane forms part of the designated London Cycle Network.

There is an industrial estate at Garrick Road, to the north of the station and west of the rail tracks.

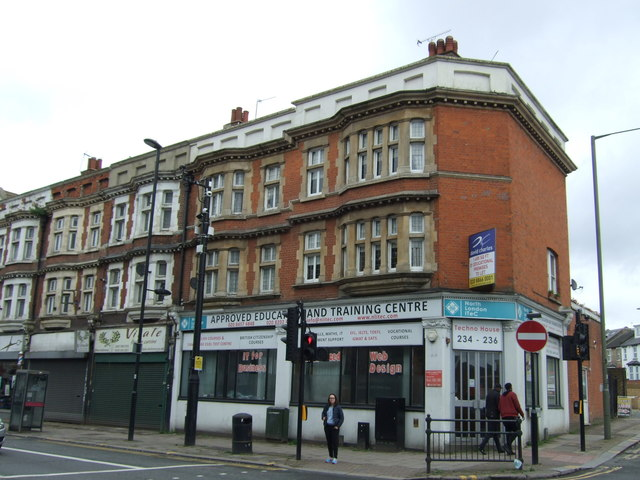
A part of West Hendon Broadway

West Hendon Broadway (part of the continuous A5 and Edgware Road) runs through the heart of West Hendon and is the main focus of activity. The street contains several local amenities such as a post office, surgery, restaurants and an Irish pub (The Wee Pub, formerly O'Hanlons), beauty salons and hairdressers, and other businesses and organisations including the Welsh Harp Boat Centre and its accompanying cafe. The southern part near Staples Corner contains several trade units and warehouses.

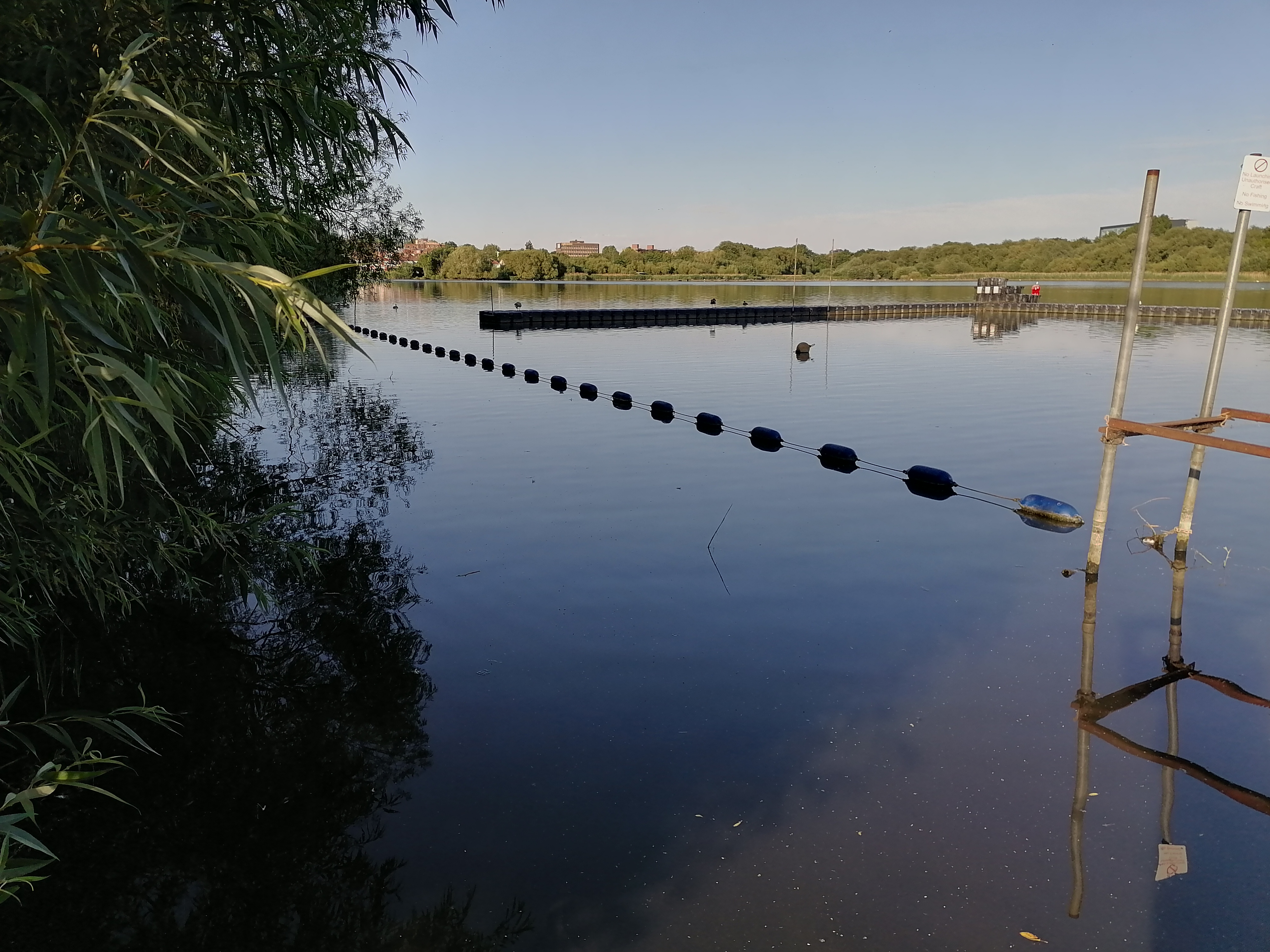
The Welsh Harp in West Hendon

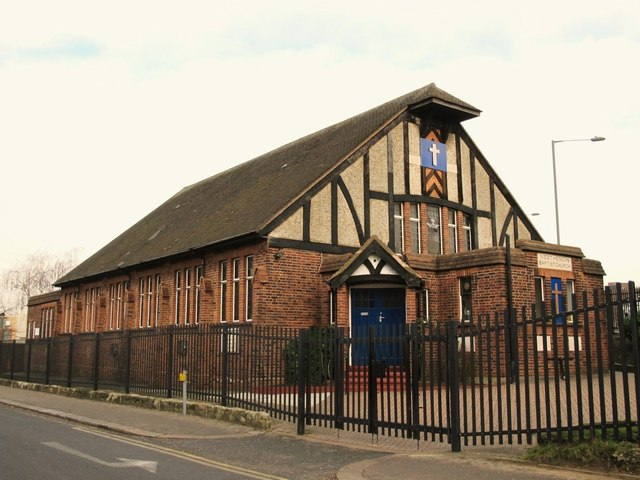
West Hendon Baptist Church

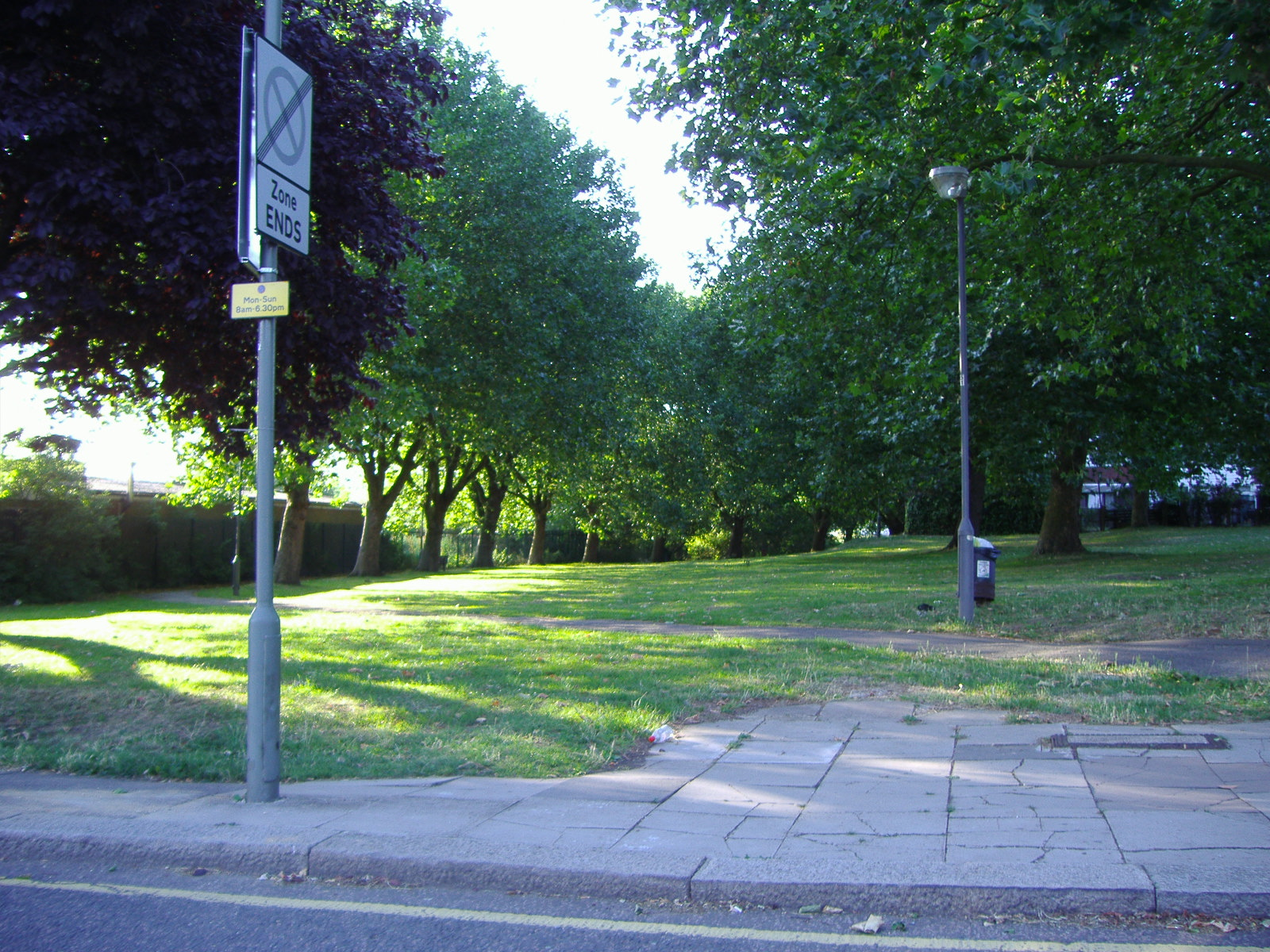
York Park, deemed a memorial park by residents, was removed during the estate regeneration

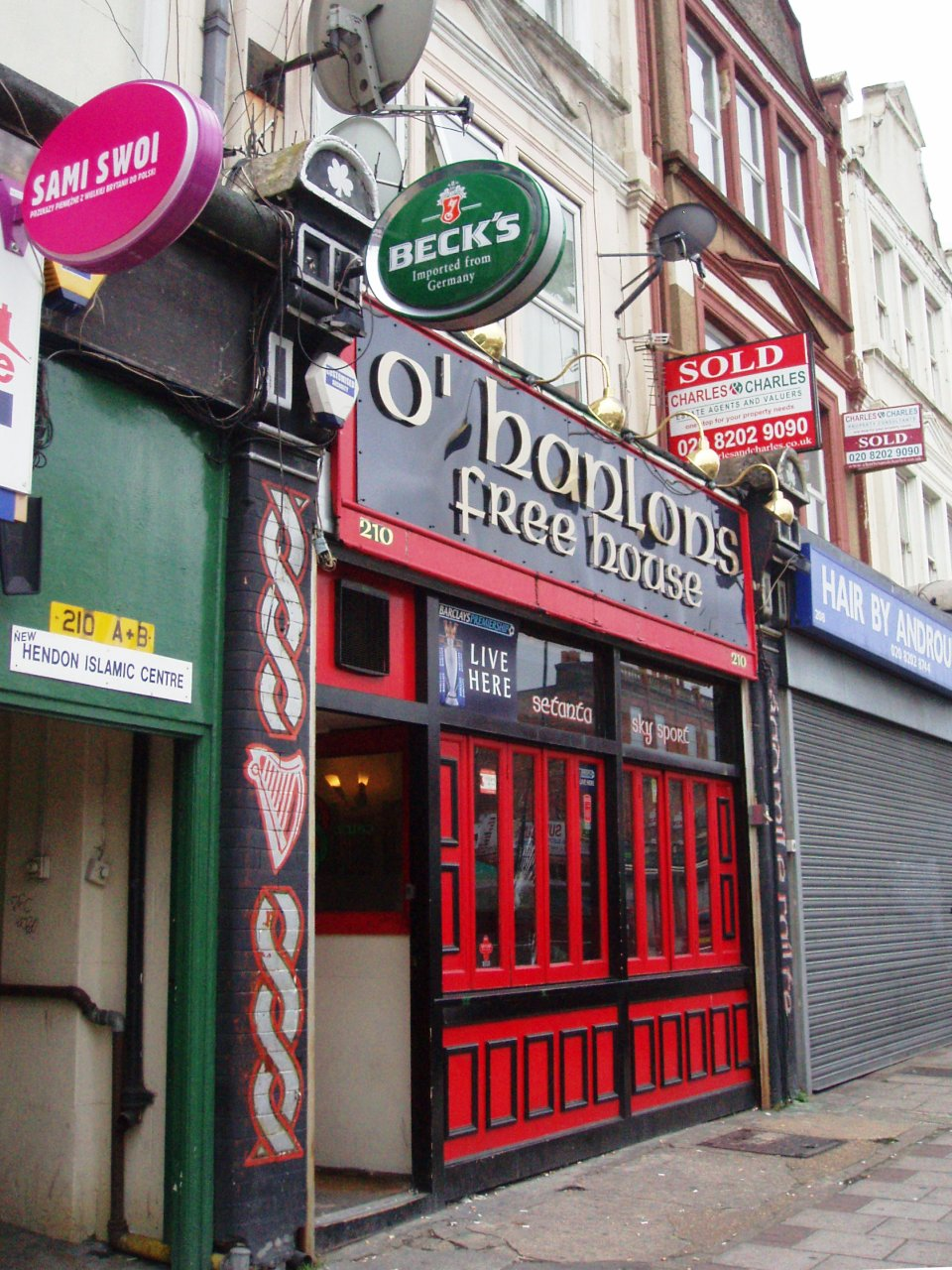
O'Hanlons pub

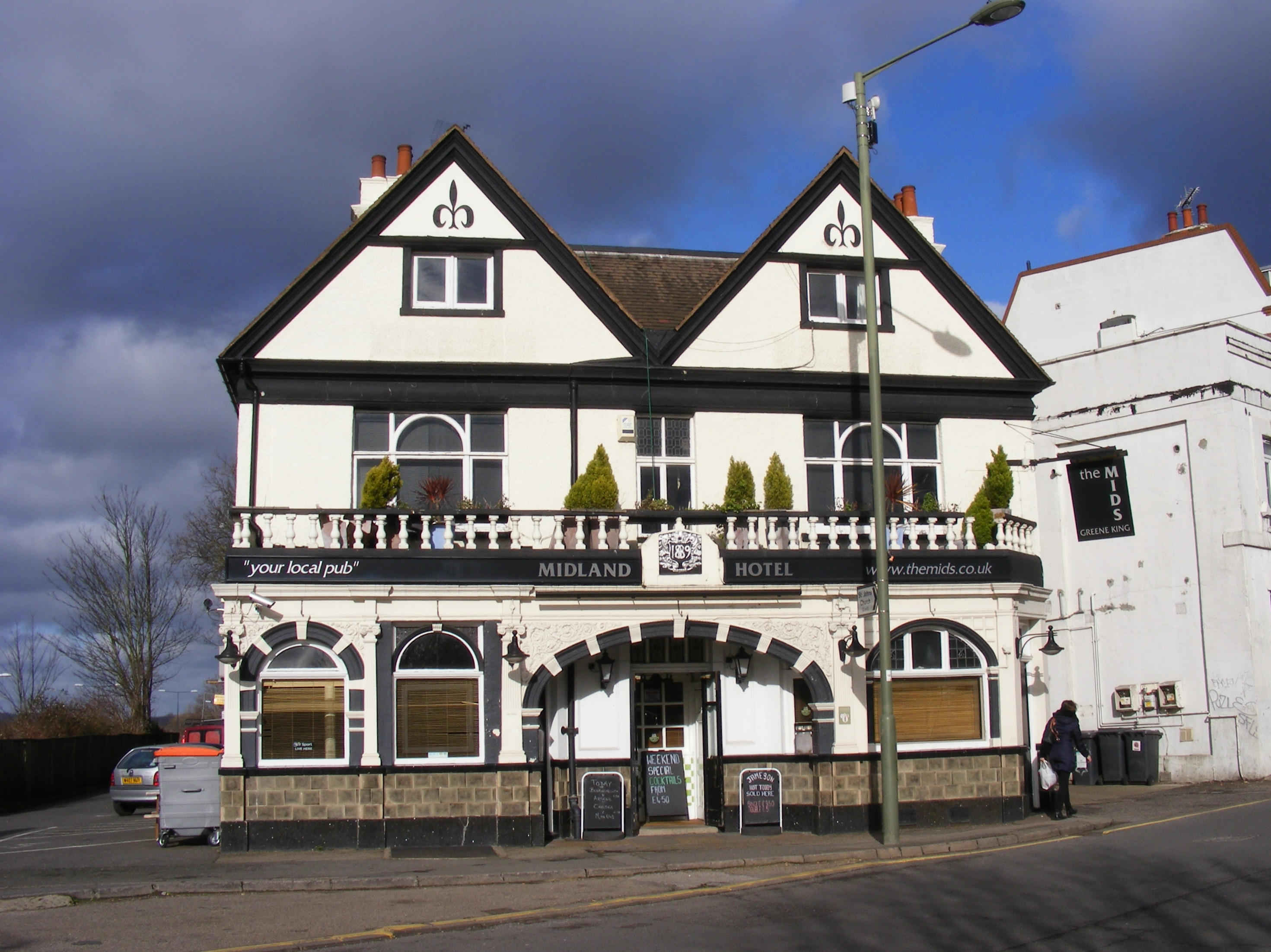
Midland Hotel next to the train station

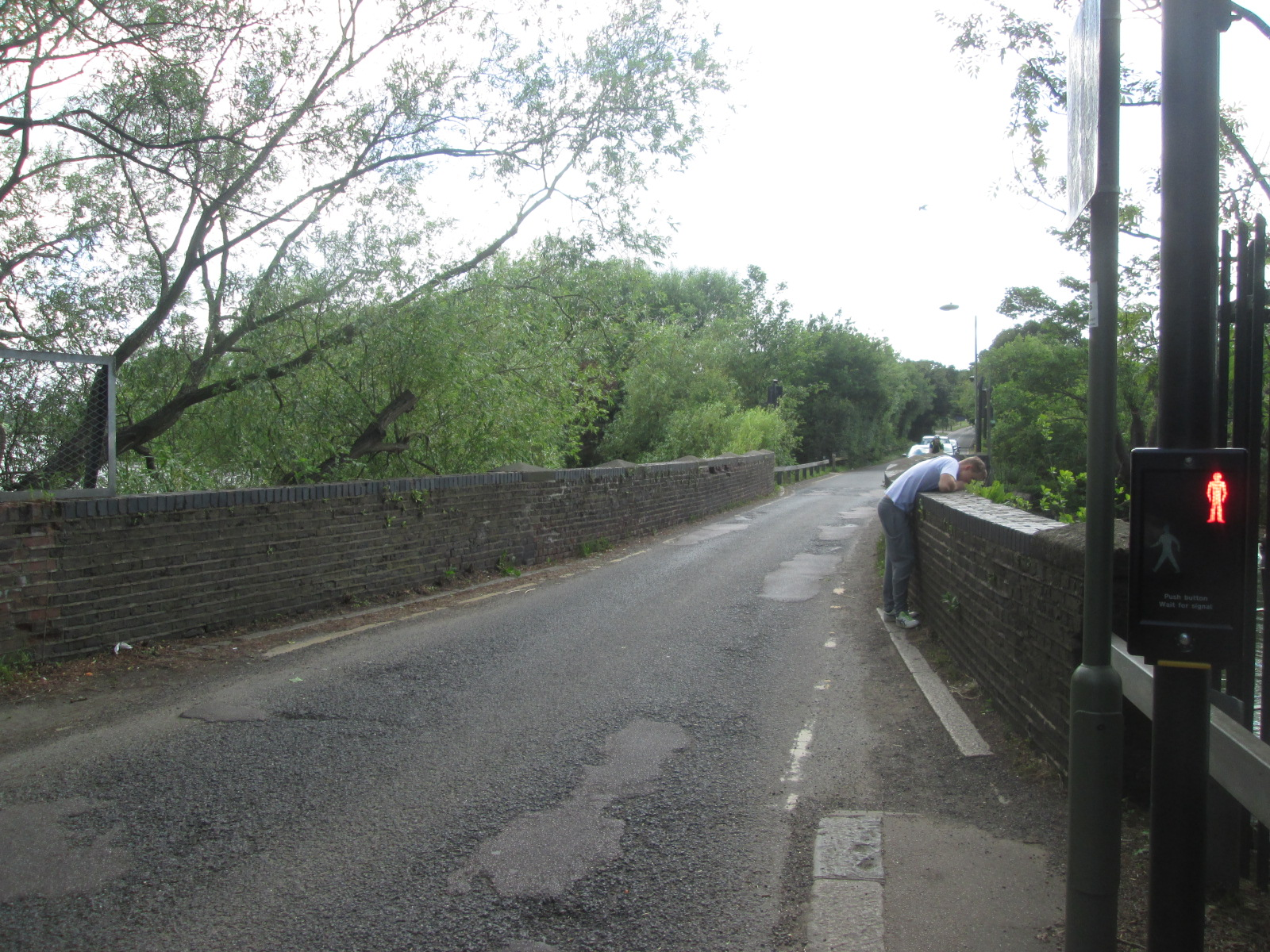
Cool Oak Bridge

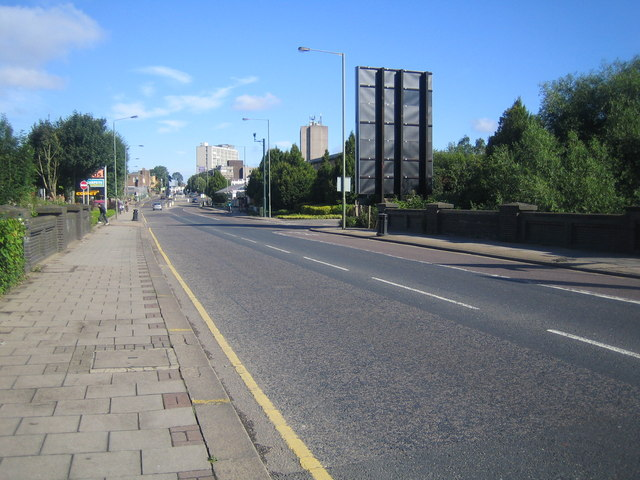
Silk Bridge on the A5 West Hendon Broadway

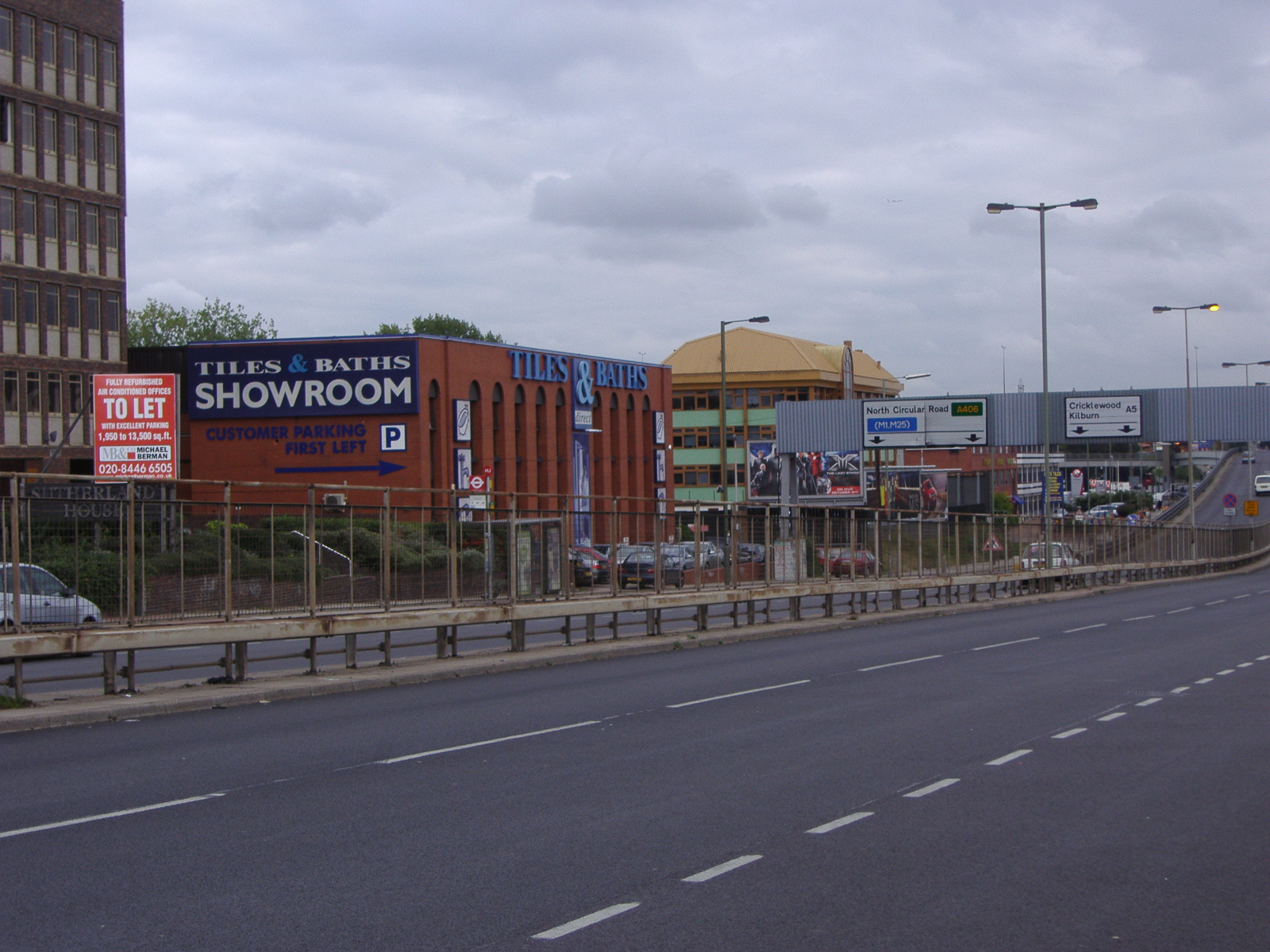
Trading units on the east side of the A5 going towards Staples Corner

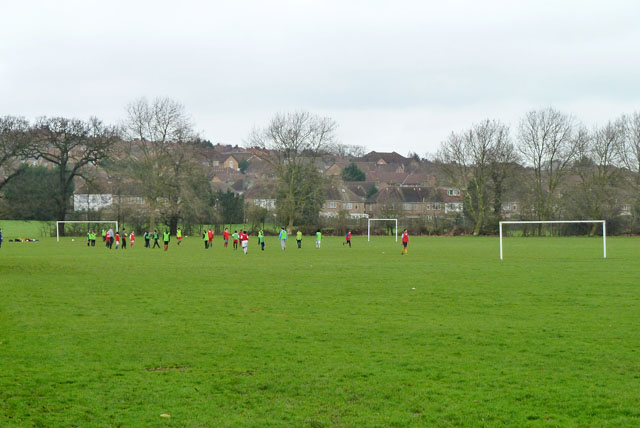
West Hendon Playing Fields

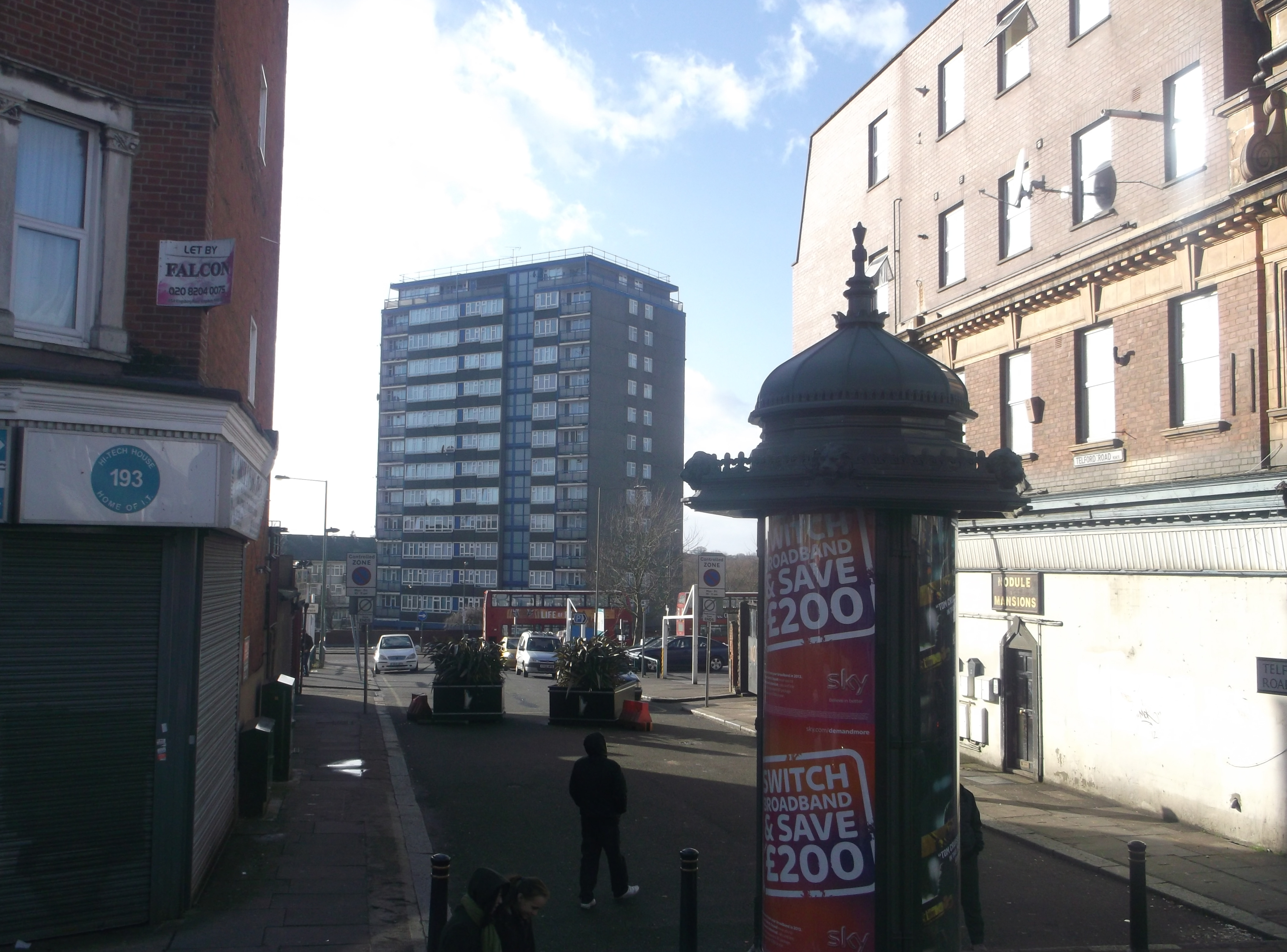
Telford Road in the old estate (2013)

=== Transport ===
The area is served by Hendon railway station on the Midland Main Line. The M1 motorway flows directly next to it. West Hendon is close by the A41 (at Hendon) and the A406 North Circular Road (at Staples Corner).

Transport for London bus routes 32, 83, 142, 183 and N16 (night) serve the area.

== Politics and government ==
West Hendon is covered by the Hendon constituency for elections to the House of Commons of the United Kingdom.

West Hendon is covered by the West Hendon ward for elections to Barnet London Borough Council.
