= West Hendon Playing Fields =

Public park in London, England

Coordinates: 51.5781°N 0.2508°W

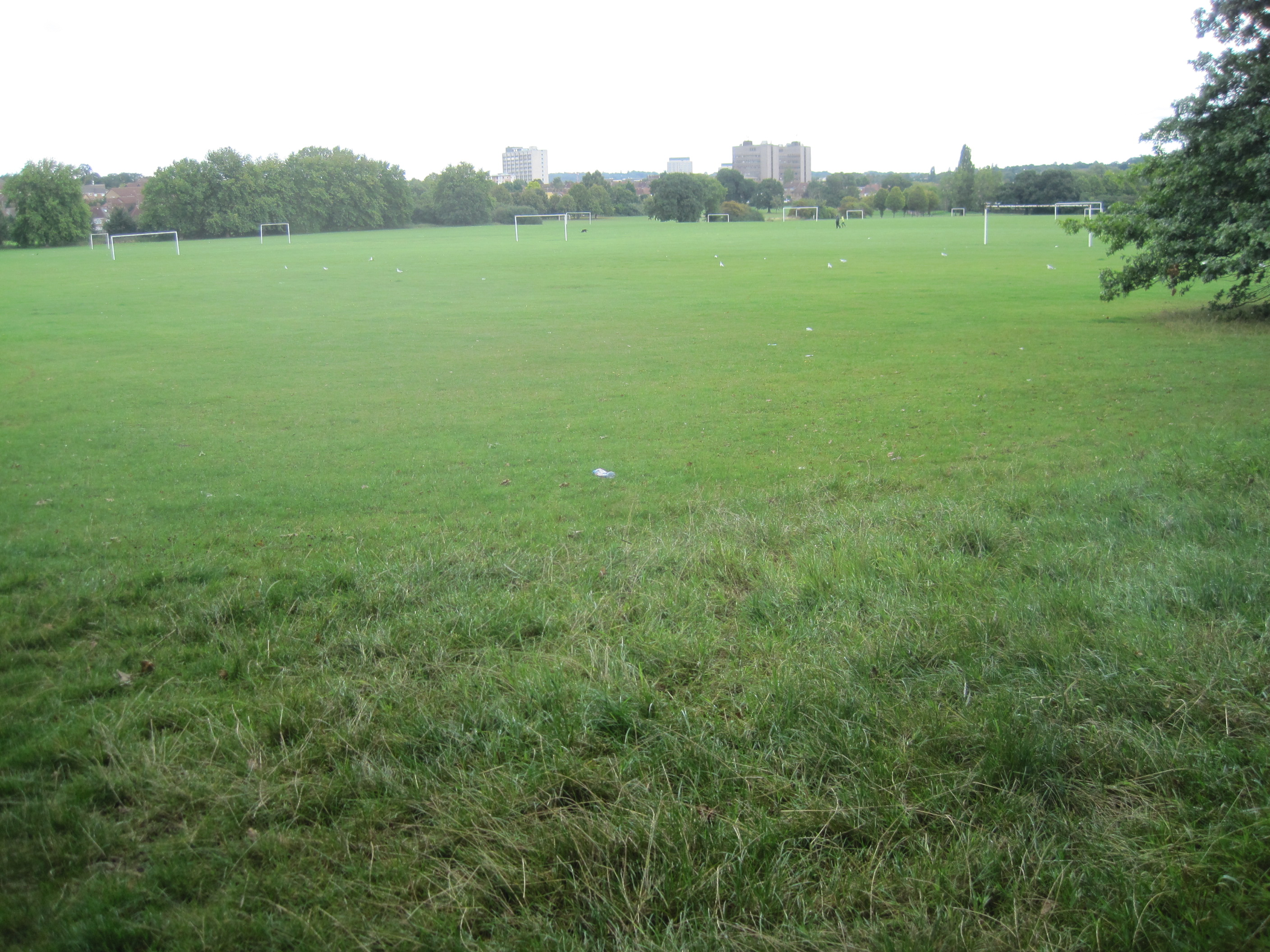
Football pitches

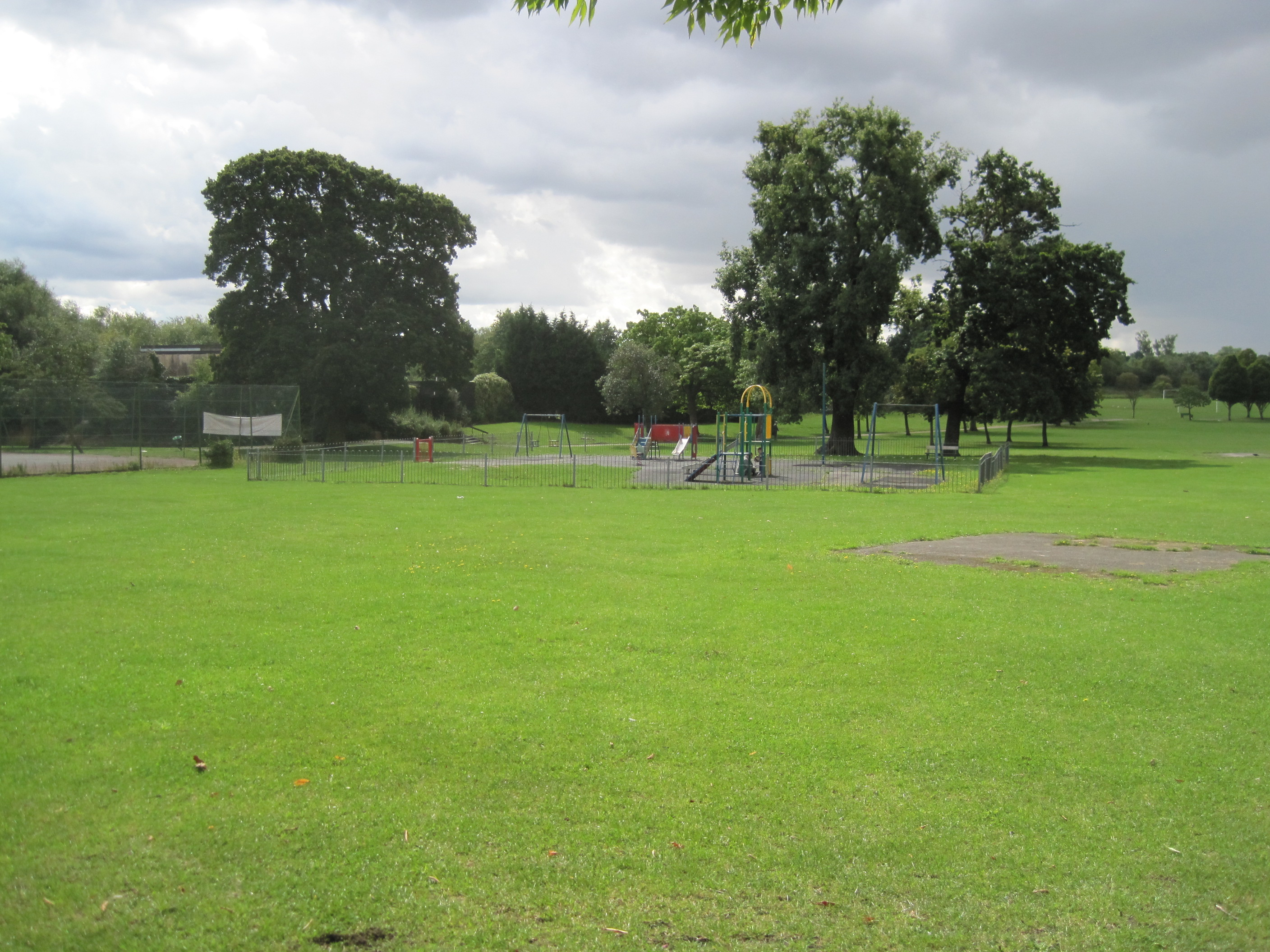
Playground

West Hendon Playing Fields is a 62 acre public park in West Hendon in the London Borough of Barnet. It is one of Barnet's Premier Parks.

It is a large grassed area with scattered mature trees. It has two tennis courts, several football pitches, a children's playground, a private bowls club, a basketball shooting hoop and a car park. The park formed part of the extensive open spaces owned by Hendon Borough Council in 1932 which became part of the London Borough of Barnet in 1965.

The park is bordered on the south by the Brent Reservoir nature reserve, and on the east by Silver Jubilee Park in Brent. There is also access from Goldsmith Avenue and Fryent Grove.

== See also ==
- Barnet parks and open spaces
