= London Buses route SL9 =

London Superloop express bus route

SL9
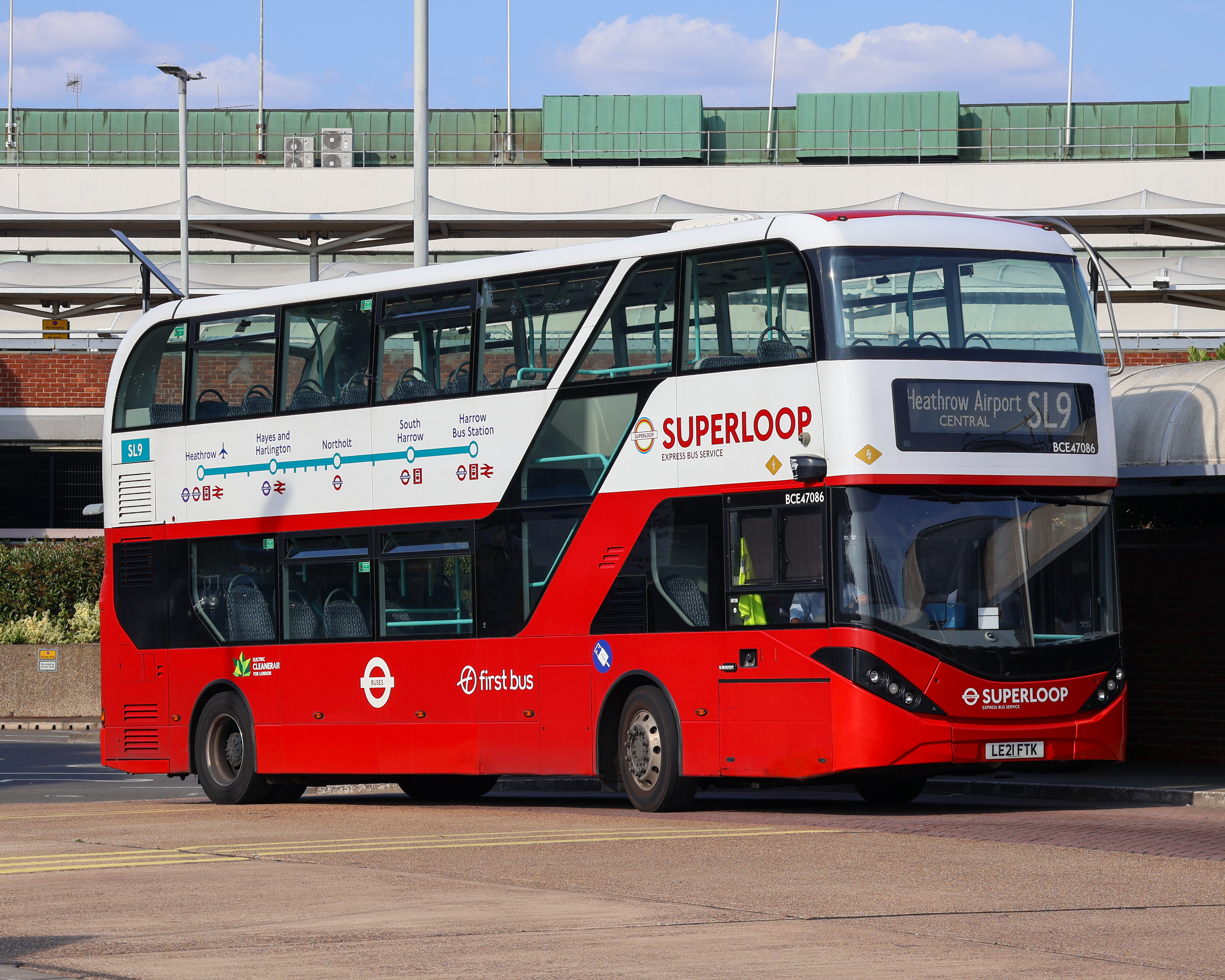
- London Sovereign BYD Alexander Dennis Enviro400EV at Heathrow Central bus station in June 2025

Overview
- Operator: London Sovereign (First Bus London)
- Garage: Harrow
- Vehicle: BYD Alexander Dennis Enviro400EV
- Began service: 7th December 2019
- Former operator: Metroline
- Night-time: Night Bus N140

Route
- Start: Heathrow Central bus station
- Via: Harlington; Hayes; Yeading; Northolt; South Harrow
- End: Harrow bus station
- Length: 10 miles (16 km)

Service
- Level: Daily
- Frequency: Every 12-15 minutes
- Journey time: 37-51 minutes
- Operates: 05:40 until 00:22

London Buses route SL9, formerly London Buses route X140, is a Transport for London contracted Superloop express bus route in London, England. Running between Heathrow Central and Harrow bus stations, it is operated by First Bus London subsidiary London Sovereign.

== History ==
The route commenced on 7 December 2019, originally numbered X140, as part of a reorganisation of routes in the lead up to the opening of the Elizabeth line. Route X140 was introduced as a limited stop service between Harrow and Heathrow Central bus stations and as a partial replacement for the all stops route 140, which was withdrawn between Hayes & Harlington and Heathrow at the same time. Route X140 was initially operated by Metroline.

Upon being put out to tender, on 4 September 2021 route X140 was taken over by London Sovereign's Harrow bus garage. However, due to delays in the delivery of new BYD Alexander Dennis Enviro400EVs, London Sovereign initially operated it with existing hybrid double deckers.

On 26 August 2023, route X140 was renumbered SL9, becoming part of the Superloop express bus network.

On 28 February 2025, the route passed from London Sovereign to First Bus London following the acquisition of RATP Dev Transit London by FirstGroup.

== Current route ==
Route SL9 operates via these primary locations:

- Heathrow Central bus station
- Harlington
- Hayes & Harlington station
- Hayes
- Yeading
- Northolt station
- Northolt Park station
- South Harrow station
- Harrow bus station

== Operation ==
The route operates at a frequency of a bus every 12 minutes on weekdays and Saturdays and a bus every 15 minutes on Sundays. Between the hours of 23:00 and 07:00, the route is covered by an all stops night service, numbered N140, running every 30 minutes between Harrow Weald bus garage and Heathrow Central bus station.
