= Henton =

Henton may refer to:

- Henton (surname)
- Henton, Oxfordshire in Chinnor civil parish, Oxfordshire, England
- Henton, in Wookey civil parish, Somerset, England
