= Henden =

Henden may refer to:

- Meanings of minor planet names: 33001–34000#529
- Edward Henden
- Arne Henden
- Rolv Henden

== See also ==
- Hendon (disambiguation)
