= London Sovereign =

North-west London bus operator, part of First Bus London

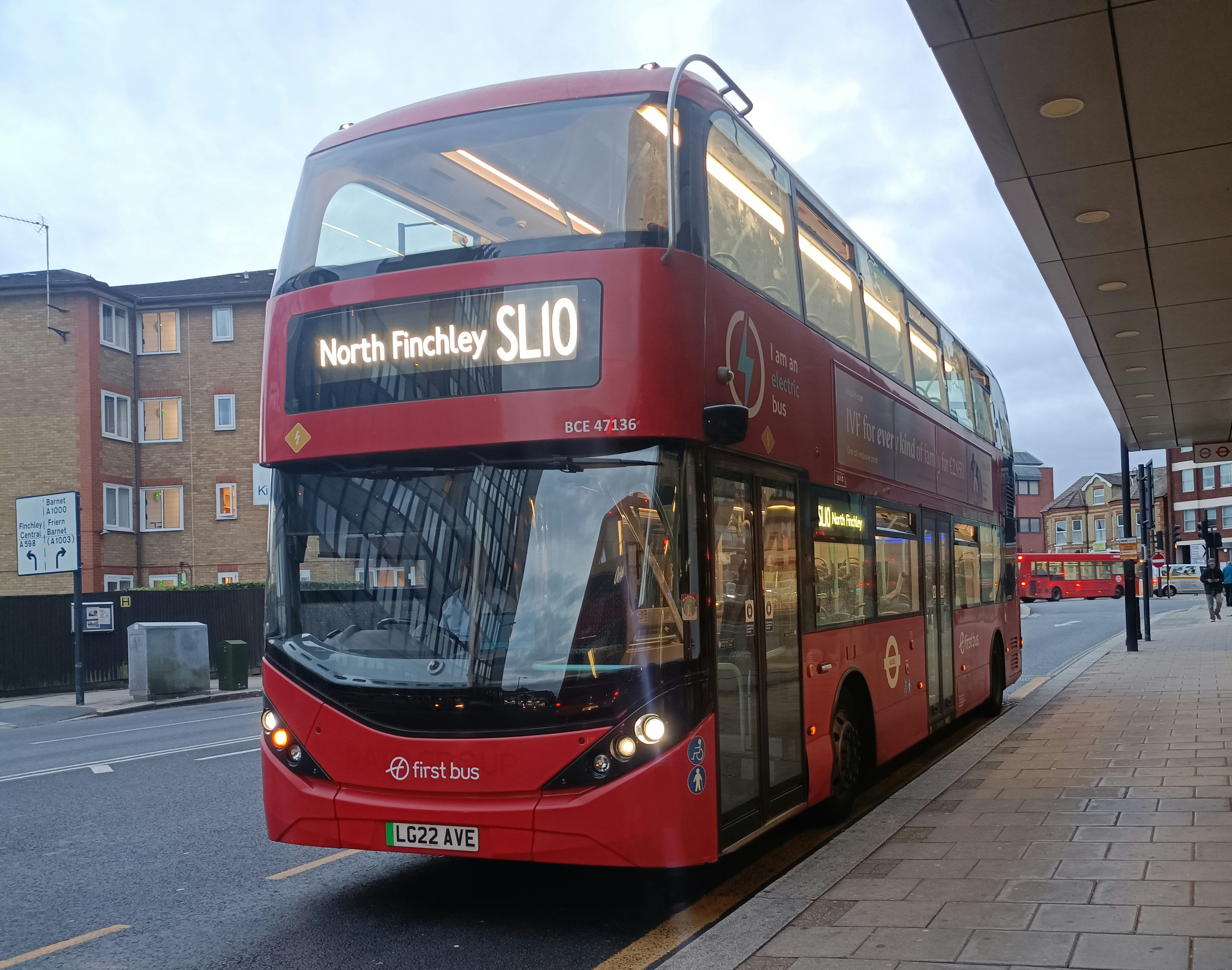
- BYD Alexander Dennis Enviro400EV on route SL10 at North Finchley bus station
- Parent: First Bus London
- Headquarters: Stamford Brook
- Service area: Greater London
- Service type: Bus services
- Routes: 19
- Depots: 2
- Fleet: 152 (May 2015)
- Fuel type: Diesel, Electric and Hybrid
- Website: www.firstbus.co.uk/london

London Sovereign is a bus operator brand under First Bus London Limited, trading as First Bus London. London Sovereign is a bus company that operates bus services in Greater London. It is currently a subsidiary of First Bus London and operates bus services under contract to Transport for London.

== Company history ==
=== Early history ===
Original London Sovereign logo

London Sovereign can trace its roots back to independent Borehamwood Travel Services which ran a fleet that included ex-Kelvin Central MCW Metrobuses and Northern Counties Palatines bodied Leyland Olympians and a collection of other vehicles. In 1993 it won its biggest London Buses contract, to operate route 13 with leased AEC Routemasters in its orange livery. In August 1994, Borehamwood Travel Services was sold to the Blazefield Group's Sovereign subsidiary, with the two operations merged as Sovereign London. On 3 November 2002, the business was sold to Transdev, and renamed Transdev London Sovereign.

=== RATP Dev era ===
After London United was transferred to RATP Group as a result of the wider Transdev group's merger with Veolia Transport in March 2011, London Sovereign became Transdev's only London bus company. In March 2014, London Sovereign was sold to RATP and resumed trading as London Sovereign. In December 2021, RATP's London bus operations including London Sovereign were transferred to an RATP joint venture with Australia's Kelsian Group (parent company of Tower Transit) known as RATP Dev Transit London.

=== FirstGroup era ===
In February 2025, London Sovereign was included in the acquisition of RATP Dev Transit London by FirstGroup, becoming part of First Bus London.

== Garages ==
London Sovereign operates two bus garages.

=== Edgware (BT) ===
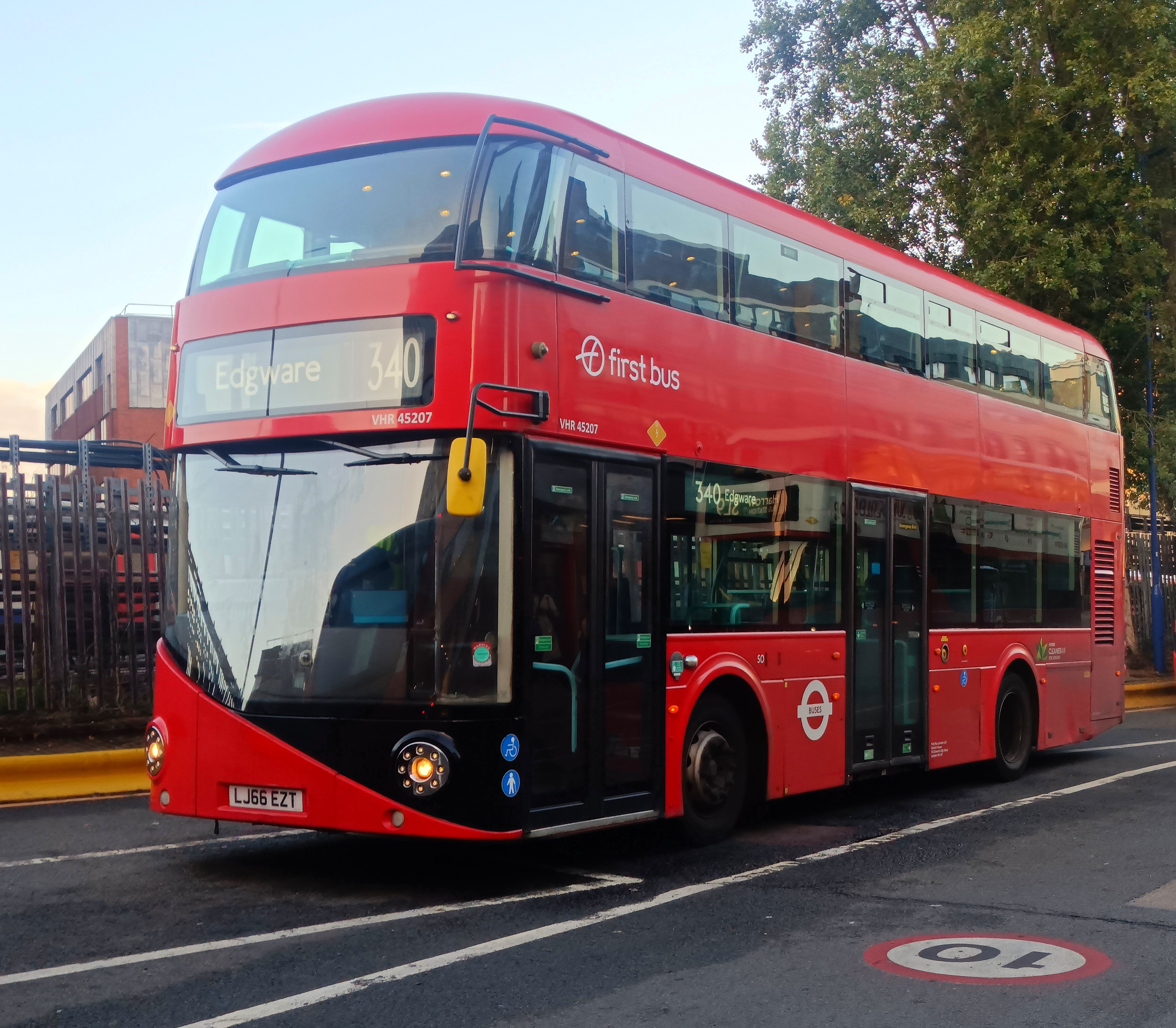
Wright SRM bodied Volvo B5LH on route 340 at Harrow bus station in September 2025

Edgware garage operates routes 79, 125, 226, 288, 303, 326, 340, H12 and N5.

Edgware garage was first opened by the London General Omnibus Company in 1925 with space for 24 buses, but there was plenty of room adjacent to the Underground station which had recently been built. In 1939 a new building was built next to the original building which was to become the new bus station, while the remaining open parking area was used to store vehicles for the trolleybus replacement program.

In 1984, a new 100-bus garage was built on the site of the long closed Edgware railway station at a cost of £4.5 million. In 1992, plans were made to close Edgware garage as Cricklewood garage was to become a fully functioning garage with new facilities. The outdoor parking area and the bus station then became a midibus base in 1993, with a new bus wash and light maintenance facilities provided in the yard.

Planning applications were submitted to Barnet London Borough Council by First Bus London in July 2025 for the development of a new Edgware garage on the site of The Broadwalk Centre, situated below the basement of a high-rise building as part of the Edgware Towers. Despite objections by residents and the London Fire Brigade, the latter stating the depot structure would provide inadequate protection against structural collapse in the event of a major fire at the depot, the plans were approved by Barnet London Borough Council in August 2025 and passed onto the Greater London Authority and the office of the Mayor of London for further review.

=== Harrow (SO) ===
Harrow garage operates routes 183, 398, H9, H10, H11, H14, H18, H19, SL9 and SL10.

Harrow garage opened in 1994. It is First Bus London's smallest London garage, holding just 42 buses. The low roof beam across the middle of the depot building was raised to allow double deckers. The garage has a plot of land next to it, owned by First Bus London, which is used to park most of the garage's single decker fleet as a result of the allocation of route 183 from 24 July 2015 bringing the garage to full capacity; routes 398 & H17 were transferred by London Sovereign to Park Royal in July 2015 to make additional room in the garage.
