= Hedon (disambiguation) =

Hedon is a small town and civil parish in the East Riding of Yorkshire, England.

Hedon may also refer to:

== People ==
- Claire Hédon (born 1962), French activist and politician
- John Hedon (1378–1386), English Member of Parliament between 1378 and 1386
- Hedon, stage name of the guitarist of Nocturna (band)

== Other uses ==
- Hedon (UK Parliament constituency), in the East Riding of Yorkshire, England
- Hedon Aerodrome, an airfield in operation intermittently between 1912 and the late 1950s in the East Riding of Yorkshire'
- Hedon railway station, a disused station on the edge of the town of Hedon
- Hedon, a unit of measurement used in felicific calculus
- "Hedon", a song from the 1997 album The Mind's I by Swedish melodic death metal band Dark Tranquillity

== See also ==
- Heddon (disambiguation)
