= Harrow bus station =

Bus station in Greater London, England

Coordinates: 51.5801°N 0.3377°W

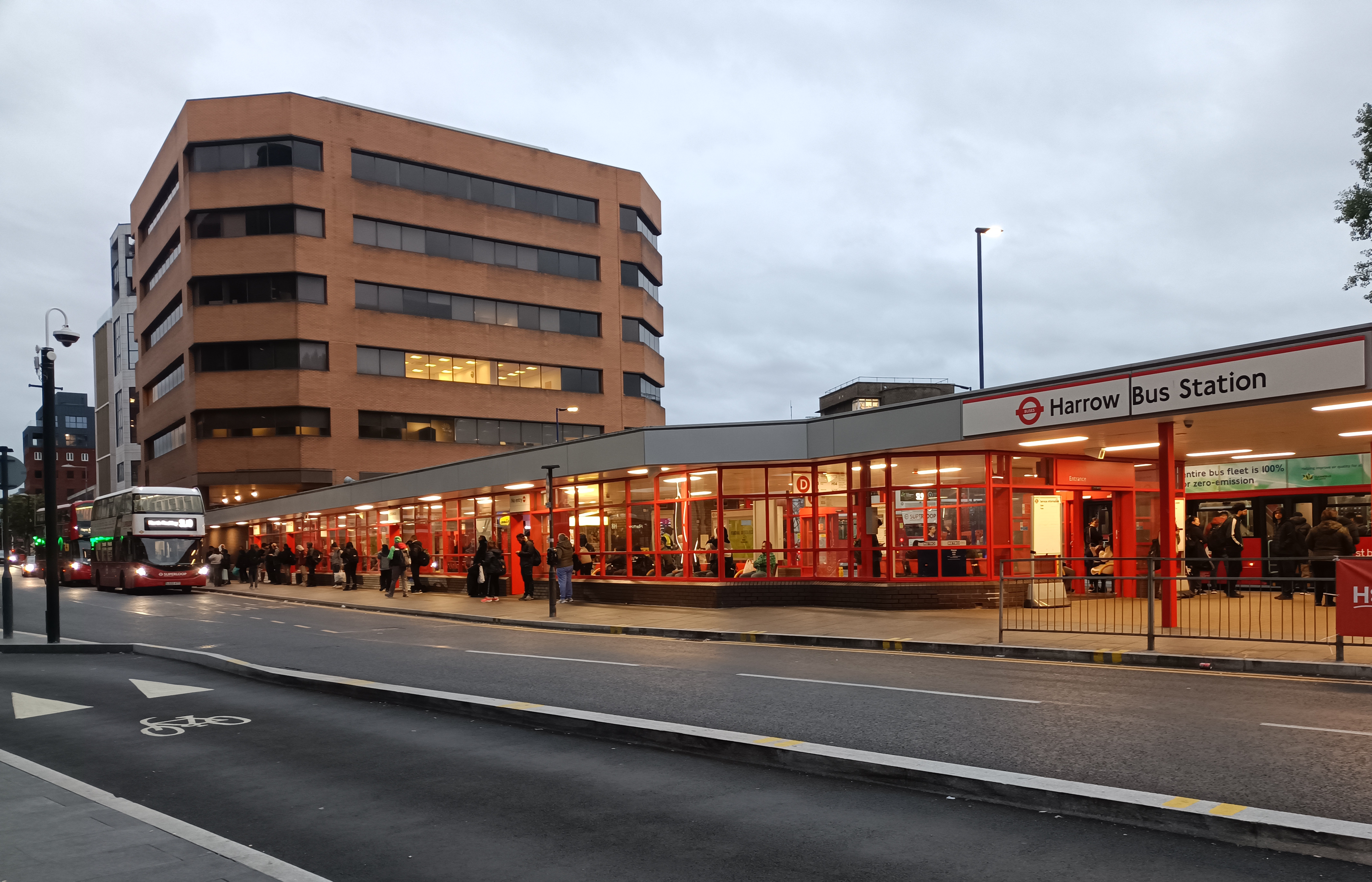

General information
- Location: College Road; London Borough of Harrow
- Operator: Transport for London
- Bus routes: 114, 140, 182, 183, 186, 223, 258, 340, 395, 483, 640, H9, H10, H11, H14, H17, H18, H19, N18, N140, SL9 and SL10
- Bus stands: 5
- Bus operators: Metroline; London Sovereign; London United; Sullivan Buses
- Connections: Harrow-on-the-Hill station (adjacent)

History
- Opened: 30 May 1981
Location

Harrow bus station serves the town of Harrow in Greater London, England. It is owned and maintained by Transport for London.

The bus station is on College Road, opposite the St Ann's Shopping Centre and approximately 100 metres from the Harrow-on-the-Hill rail and tube stations.

There are five stands within the bus station. The main operators at the bus station are London Sovereign and Metroline.

Buses go from Harrow as far afield as Watford, Ealing, Edgware, Brent Cross, Golders Green, Wembley, Heathrow Airport, Ruislip, Northolt, Greenford, Charing Cross (Night Bus), Bushey Heath and Northwood.

== History ==
An official opening ceremony was held on 27 May 1981, attended by the chairman of London Transport and the Mayor of Harrow. It was built at a cost of £865,000. The bus station opened to the public on 30 May. It was one of the first London Transport buildings to be built with the disabled in mind – the design included an accessible toilet and dropped kerbs.

Vandalism was a major problem for the bus station. In April 1988, London Regional Transport announced that they had commissioned an architect to examine the bus station and recommend changes to counter vandalism. The bus station reopened on 27 June 1993 following a four month refurbishment.
