= Hendon railway station =

National Rail station in London, England

Hendon
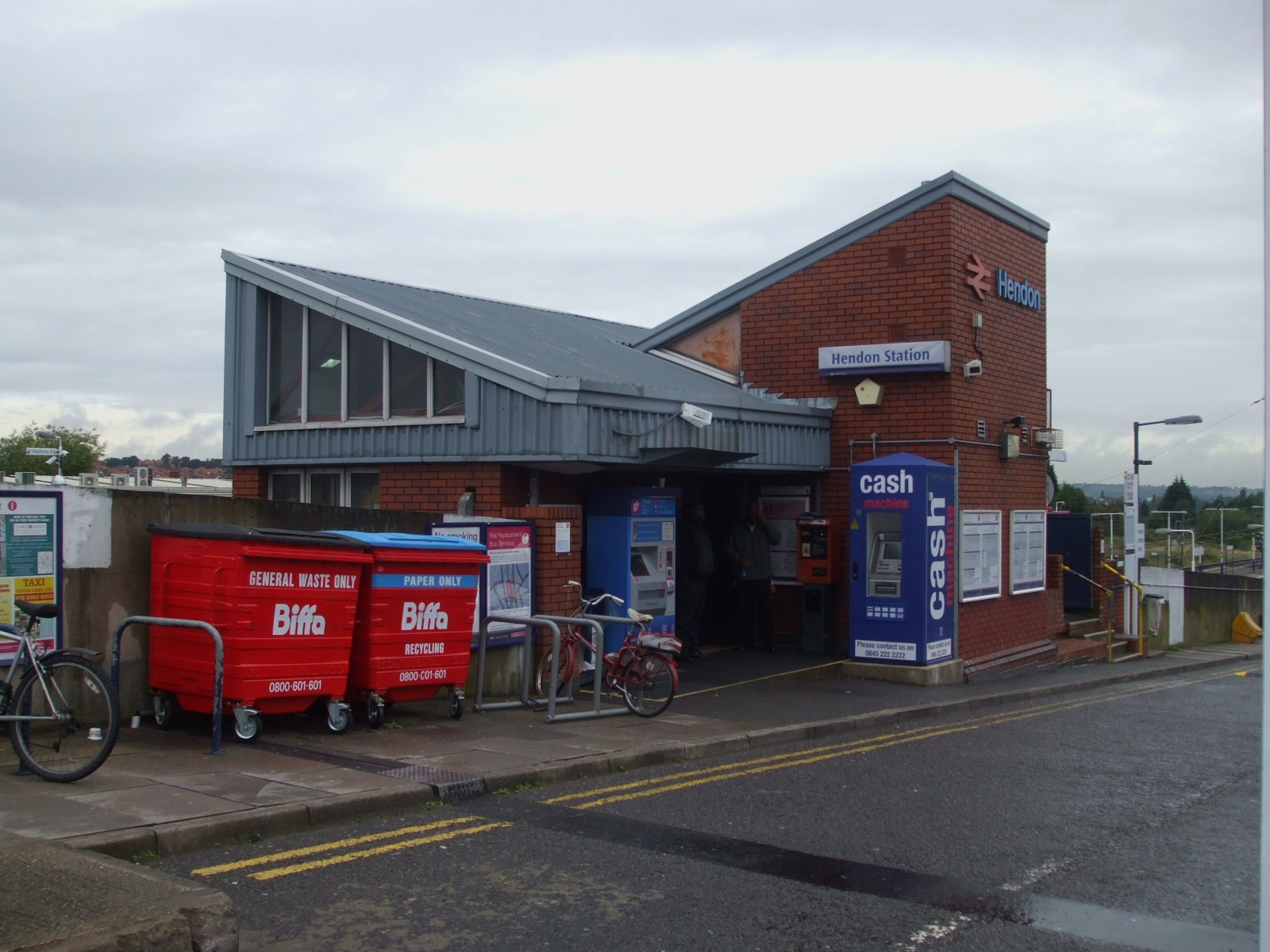
- Interactive map of Hendon

General information
- Location: West Hendon
- Local authority: London Borough of Barnet
- Managed by: Thameslink
- Station code: HEN
- DfT category: E
- Number of platforms: 4
- Fare zone: 3 and 4

National Rail annual entry and exit
- 2020–21: ▼0.345 million
- 2021–22: ▲0.662 million
- 2022–23: ▲0.884 million
- 2023–24: ▲0.958 million
- 2024–25: ▲1.027 million

Key dates
- 9 March 1868: Opened for goods
- 13 July 1868: opened for passengers

Other information
- External links: Departures; Facilities
- Coordinates: 51.58°N 0.2389°W

Hendon railway station is a National Rail station on the Midland Main Line in England, in West Hendon in the London Borough of Barnet, north London. It is 6 miles 79 chains (11.2 km) down the line from St Pancras and is situated between Brent Cross West to the south and Mill Hill Broadway to the north. Its three-letter station code is HEN.

The station is served by Thameslink-operated trains on the Thameslink route. It is on the boundary of London fare zone 3 and 4.

It was built by the Midland Railway in 1868 on its extension to St. Pancras. From 1875 the Midland opened a service to Victoria on the London, Chatham and Dover Railway line and received coaches from the London and South Western Railway for attachment to northbound trains.

== Location ==
The station is on Station Road in West Hendon, next to the M1 motorway, about 1 km from Hendon Central.

== Services ==
All services at Hendon are operated by Thameslink using Class 700 EMUs.

The typical off-peak service in trains per hour is:

- 4 tph to St Albans City
- 4 tph to Sutton (2 of these run via Mitcham Junction and 2 run via Wimbledon)

During the peak hours, the station is served by additional services to and from Luton, Orpington and Rainham, as well as some late evening services to and from Bedford.

The station is also served by a night service between Bedford and Three Bridges on Sunday to Friday nights.

Preceding station	National Rail	Following station
Mill Hill Broadway	Thameslink Thameslink	Brent Cross West

== Development ==
From March 2009, Southeastern and Thameslink began running some peak hour trains from Sevenoaks to Luton, though in the off-peak these services turn back at Kentish Town.

In 2017 the London Assembly and Transport for London published a plan to extend the London Overground network to Hendon. The scheme, known as the West London Orbital envisages re-opening the Dudding Hill freight line to passenger services and running trains from West Hampstead Thameslink and Hendon to Hounslow via the planned Old Oak Common Lane station. The plans are currently at public consultation stage with TfL.

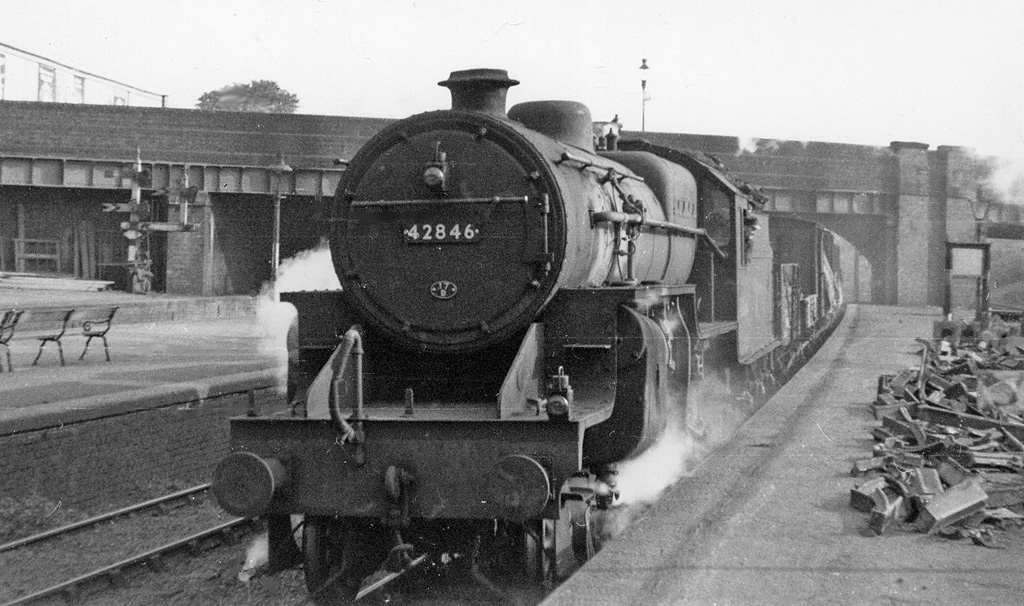
Down fast freight in 1949

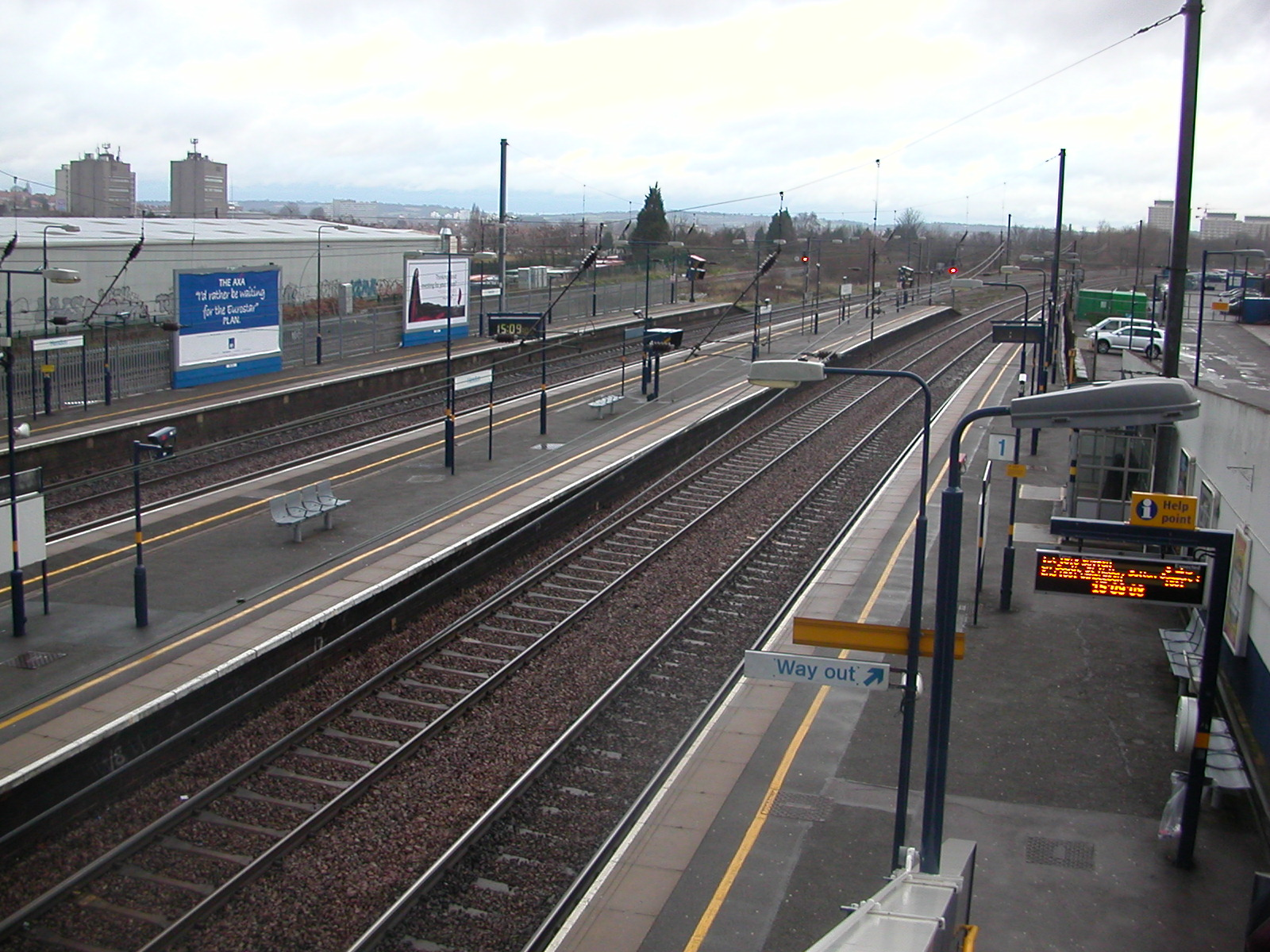
Northbound view across the four platforms. The two additional freight lines are behind the platform fencing on the extreme left. Off the right-hand side of the photograph, beyond the car park, runs the parallel M1 motorway.

== Connections ==
London Buses routes 83, 183, SL10, school routes 653 and 683 and night routes N5 and N83 serve the station.
