= London Buses route 183 =

London bus route

183
- London Sovereign BYD Alexander Dennis Enviro400EV in Golders Green in October 2026

Overview
- Operator: London Sovereign (First Bus London)
- Garage: Harrow
- Vehicle: BYD Alexander Dennis Enviro400EV

Route
- Start: Pinner station
- Via: Harrow; Kenton; Kingsbury; Hendon
- End: Golders Green station

London Buses route 183 is a Transport for London contracted bus route in London, England. Running between Pinner and Golders Green stations, it is operated by First Bus London subsidiary London Sovereign.

== History ==
Route 183 commenced operating on 3 October 1934, running from Northwood Garage to Golders Green station via Pinner, North Harrow, Kenton, Kingsbury and Hendon, operating from Hendon garage, using Leyland Titan STDs which were in turn replaced in 1953 by the AEC Regent III RTs. This route was still much the same in 1952. LT-type buses allocated to Harrow Weald garage were used on route 183 between Golders Green and Pinner. In April 1937, STD-type buses first went into service on route 183.

Upon being re-tendered, the route passed to London Sovereign with a new contract commencing in September 1999, with single deck Plaxton Pointer bodied Dennis Dart SLFs.

In 2008, the route was the subject to persistent theft. Gangs of pickpockets targeted old people, slashing their bags and stealing their money, keys and other possessions.

In 2009 the route was again re-tendered and was retained by London Sovereign with a new contract awarded. On 18 January 2014, the frequency was increased again, by 25 per cent.

On 7 October 2016, the route commenced operating 24 hours on Friday and Saturday nights to coincide with the introduction of the Night Tube on the Jubilee line.

On 28 February 2025, the route passed from London Sovereign to First Bus London following the acquisition of RATP Dev Transit London by FirstGroup.

== Current route ==
Route 183 operates via these primary locations:

- Pinner station
- North Harrow
- Harrow bus station for Harrow-on-the-Hill station
- Kenton station
- Kingsbury station
- West Hendon
- Hendon station
- Middlesex University London
- Golders Green station

== Gallery ==
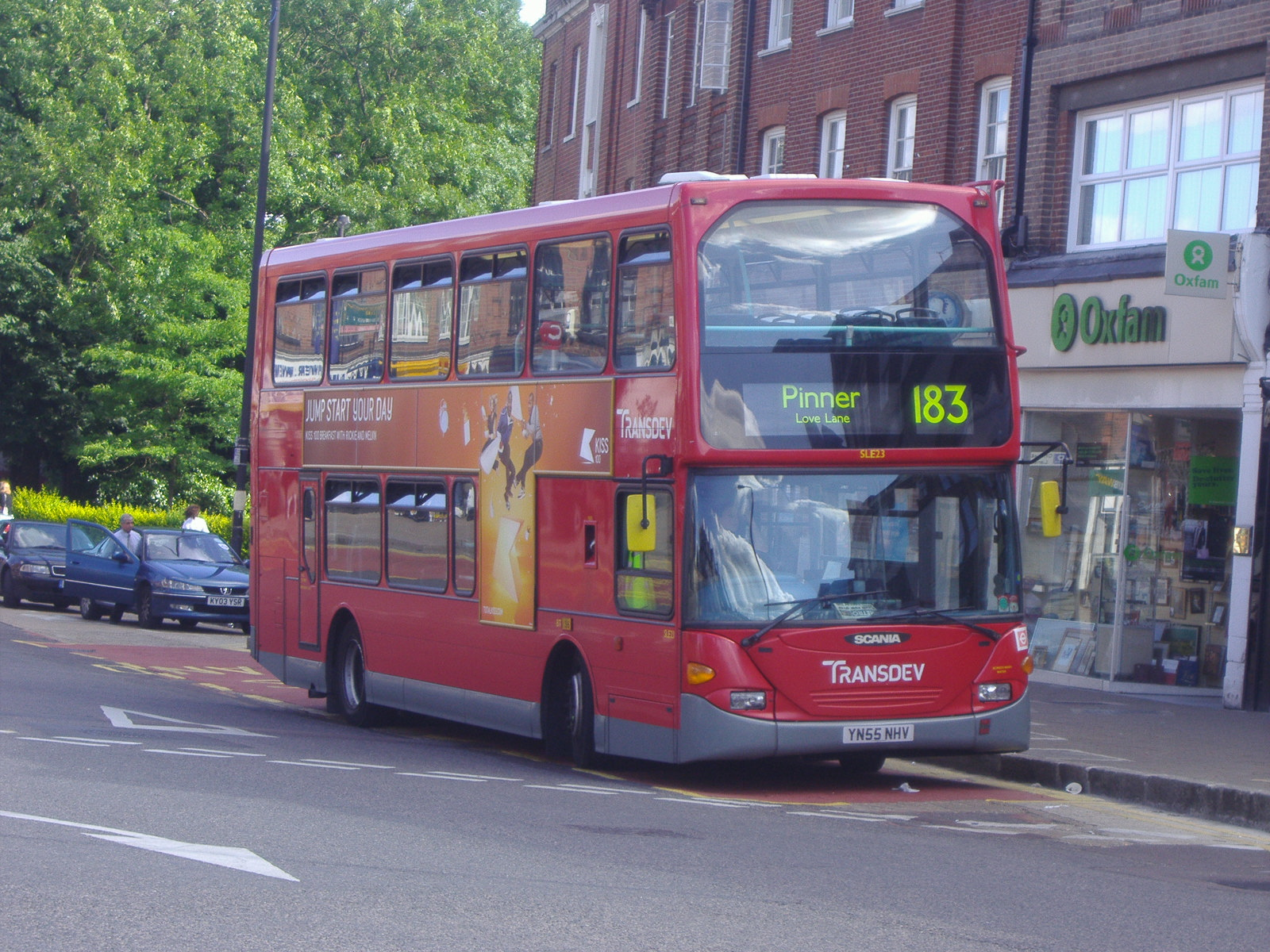
Transdev London Scania OmniDekka bodied Scania N94UD in Pinner in June 2008

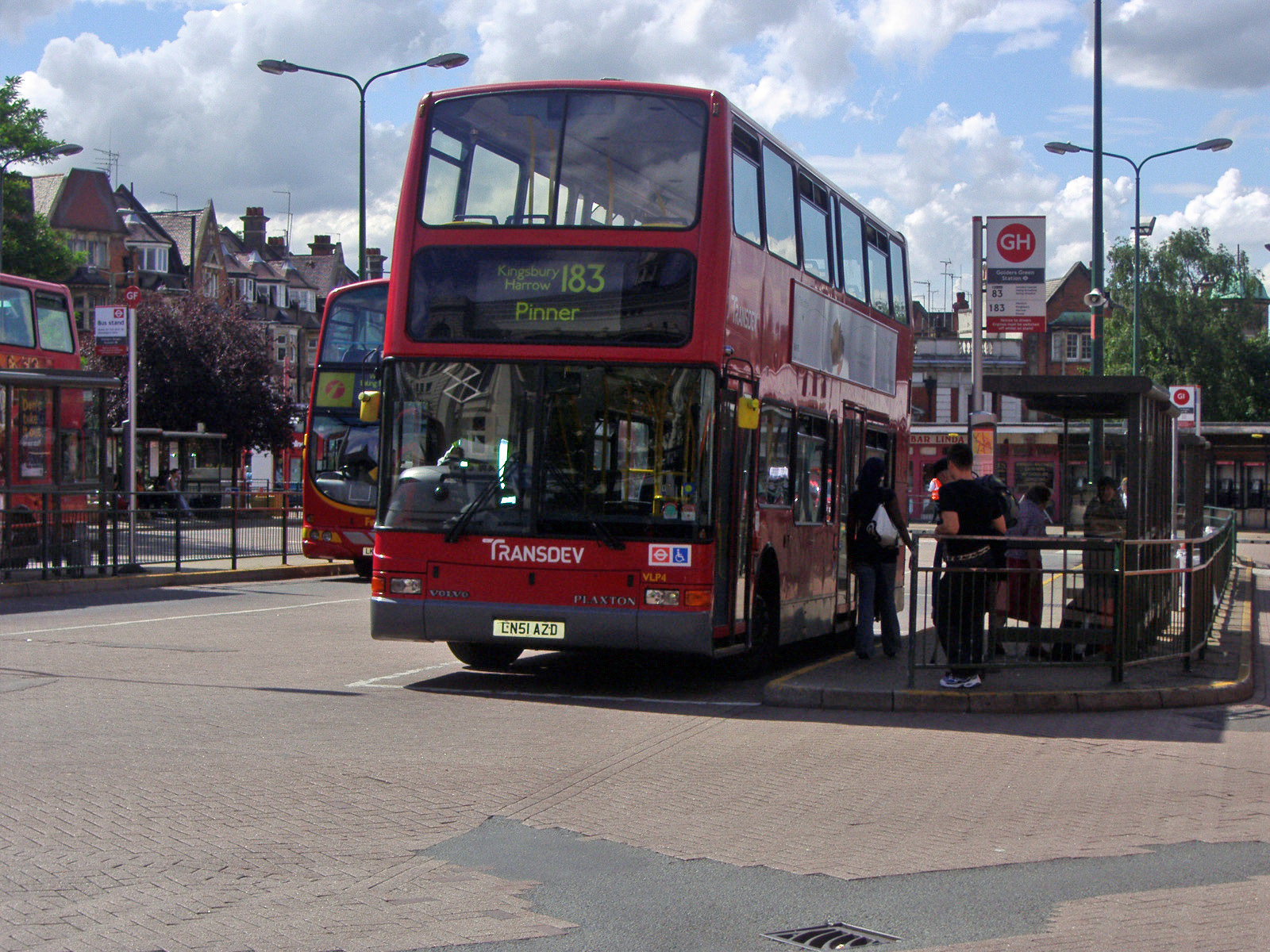
Transdev London Plaxton President bodied Volvo B7TL at Golders Green station in August 2008

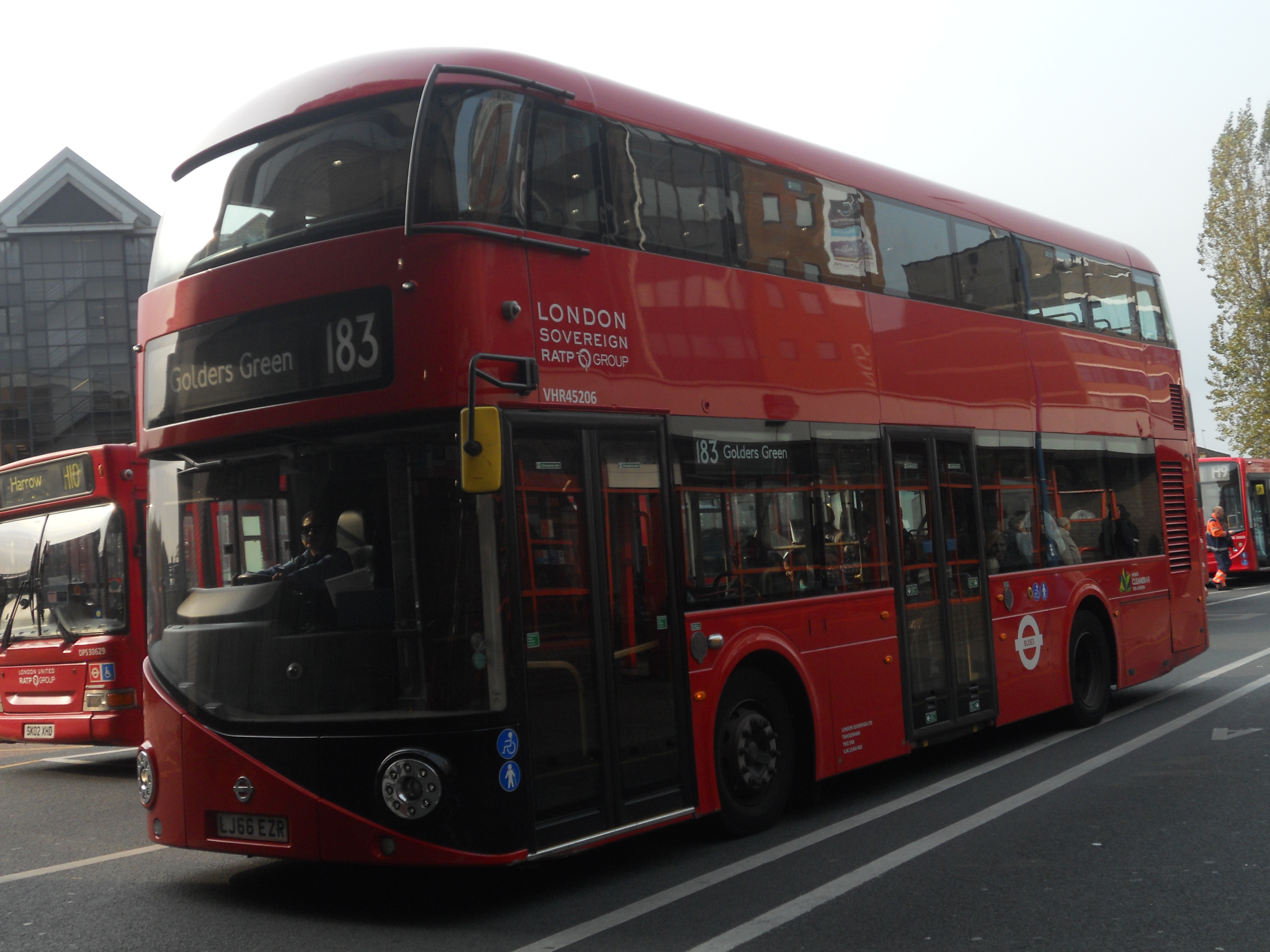
London Sovereign Wright SRM bodied Volvo B5LH at Harrow bus station in October 2017
