= Henton (surname) =

Henton is a surname. Notable people with the surname include:

- Anthony Henton (born 1963), American football player
- Antonio Henton (born 1987), American football player
- Brian Henton (born 1946), English racing driver
- John Henton (born 1960), American actor and comedian
- LaDontae Henton (born 1992), American basketball player

== See also ==
- Henton Elmore (1921–1991), American politician
