= London Buses route 6 =

London bus route

6
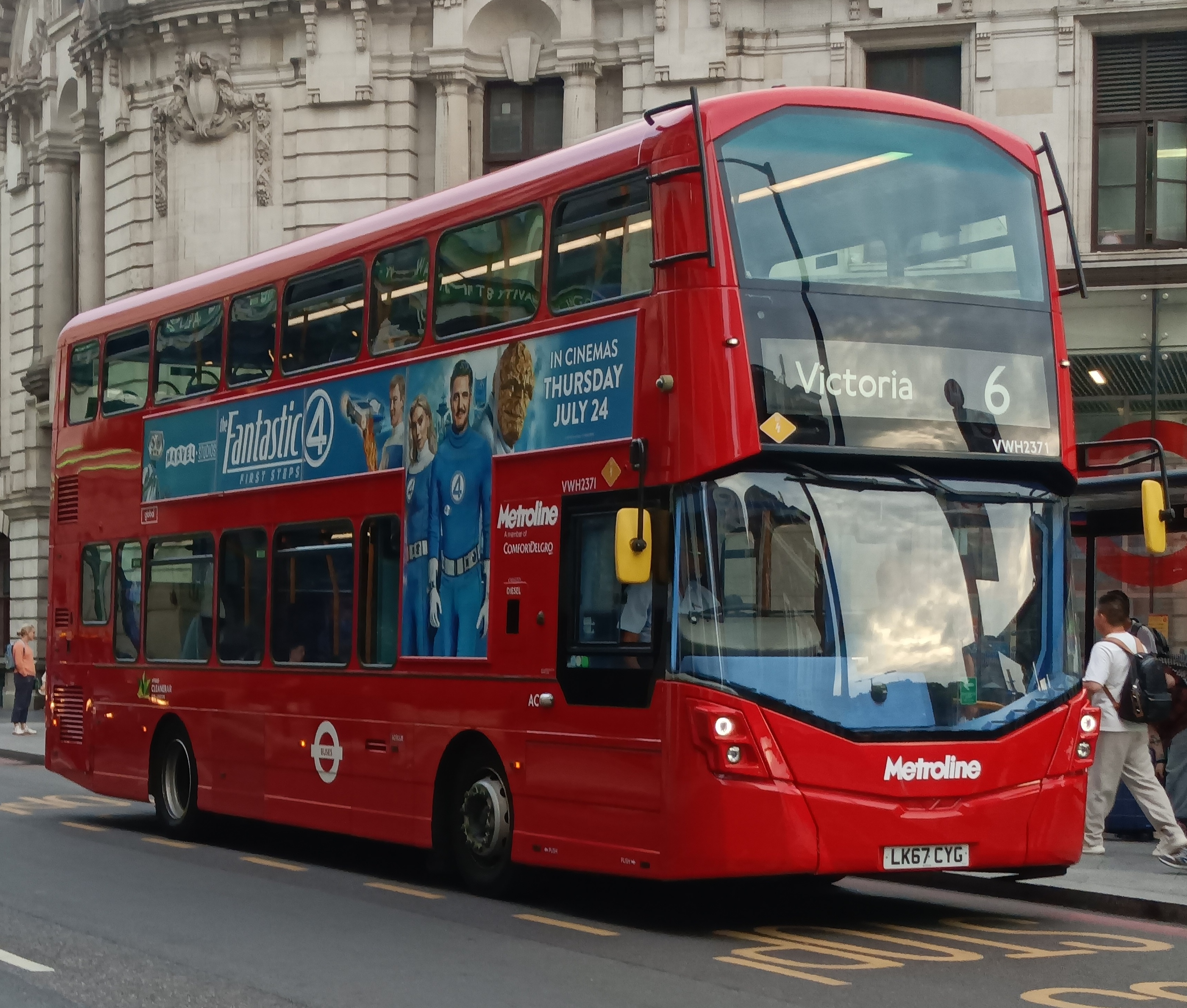
- Metroline Wright Gemini 3 bodied Volvo B5LH at Victoria station in July 2025

Overview
- Operator: Metroline
- Garage: Willesden
- Vehicle: Volvo B5LH Wright Gemini 3
- Peak vehicle requirement: Day: 18; Night: 4
- Began service: 1934
- Night-time: 24-hour service

Route
- Start: Victoria station
- Via: Hyde Park Corner; Marble Arch; Edgware Road; Warwick Avenue; Queen's Park; Kensal Rise
- End: Willesden bus garage

Service
- Journey time: 42-66 minutes
- Operates: 24-hour service
- Timetable: Transport for London

London Buses route 6 is a Transport for London contracted bus route in London, England. Running between Victoria station and Willesden bus garage, it is operated by Metroline.

== History ==
An AEC Routemaster double-decker operated by Metroline approaching Oxford Street , April 2003

In 1934, route 6 operated from Willesden to Leyton via Marble Arch, Oxford Circus, Piccadilly Circus, Trafalgar Square and Aldwych. On 14 January 1942, it was withdrawn between Willesden and Kensal Rise. In May 1949, AEC Regent III RT buses were introduced.

On 25 October 1969, it was withdrawn between Hackney Wick and Leyton. On 18 July 1992, it was further cut, with the section between Aldwych and Hackney Wick replaced by new route 26.

On 27 March 2004, route 6, along with route 98, was converted to one man operation, with the AEC Routemasters replaced by Plaxton President bodied Volvo B7TLs. It was decided to run all journeys to Willesden garage, to provide a more consistent service along this corridor. However, the residents of Staverton Road, along which route 6's garage journeys passed (along with buses on route 52 and 302) objected to the increase in bus traffic. So the number of through journeys had to be limited to the previous level. The service has since been re-routed via Donnington Road and Pound Lane.

Throughout June 2015, new Volvo B5LH bodied Wright Eclipse Gemini 3s were allocated to the route. On 17 June 2017, route 6 was altered to operate via Park Lane and Piccadilly in lieu of Oxford and Regent Streets. Since the introduction of tendering, it has always been operated by Metroline from Willesden bus garage.

On 23 November 2022, it was announced that route 6 would be rerouted to run to Victoria station instead of Aldwych following a consultation. This change was implemented on 29 April 2023.

On 25 September 2026, it was announced that route 6 would become the first route to be operated by Buses for London out of its Park Royal garage. This is due to take place when Metroline's contract expires in late 2027.

== Current route ==
Route 6 operates via these primary locations:

- Victoria station
- Buckingham Palace Road Bressenden Place
- Hyde Park Corner
- Marble Arch station
- Edgware Road station
- Church Street Market
- Warwick Avenue station
- Maida Hill
- Queen's Park station
- Kensal Rise station
- Willesden bus garage
