= Route 52 (disambiguation) =

Route 52 may refer to:

- Route 52 (WMATA), a bus route in Washington, D.C.
- London Buses route 52

== See also ==
- List of highways numbered 52
