= Buses for London =

Future bus company in London, England

- Parent: Transport for London
- Founded: 4 December 2027
- Headquarters: Park Royal, London, England
- Service area: London
- Service type: Bus services
- Depots: 1

Buses for London is a future publicly owned bus company in London, England that will begin operations on 4 December 2027. It will be a subsidiary of Transport for London. It will initially operate route 6 from a depot in Park Royal. Four further routes are expected to be operated from 2028.

== Background ==
Transport for London (TfL) contracts approximately 700 bus routes to private operators. TfL had previously operated buses through East Thames Buses, that was formed in 1999 to take over the services operated by the failed Harris Bus. It was sold in 2009 to London General.

== History ==
In January 2026, the proposal for TfL to run a bus company first appeared in a business plan. In September 2026, TfL announced it would begin directly operating bus services in its own right, rather than by contractors, through Buses for London.

== Future ==
Buses for London will commence operating on 4 December 2027 when it takes over route 6 from Metroline. A further four yet to be announced routes will be taken over from private operators in 2028.

Buses for London will initially operate out of a depot in Park Royal within the Old Oak and Park Royal Development Corporation area. It will be leased until 2033, and then a permanent depot will be established. The depot will accommodate 100 electric buses.
