= London Buses route 8 =

London bus route

8
- East London New Routemaster at Oasis Sports Centre in November 2023

Overview
- Operator: East London (Stagecoach London)
- Garage: Bow
- Vehicle: New Routemaster
- Peak vehicle requirement: 22
- Night-time: Night Bus N8

Route
- Start: Bow Church
- Via: Bethnal Green; Shoreditch; Bank; Holborn
- End: Tottenham Court Road

London Buses route 8 is a Transport for London contracted bus route in London, England. Running between Bow Church and Tottenham Court Road, it is operated by Stagecoach London subsidiary East London.

== History ==
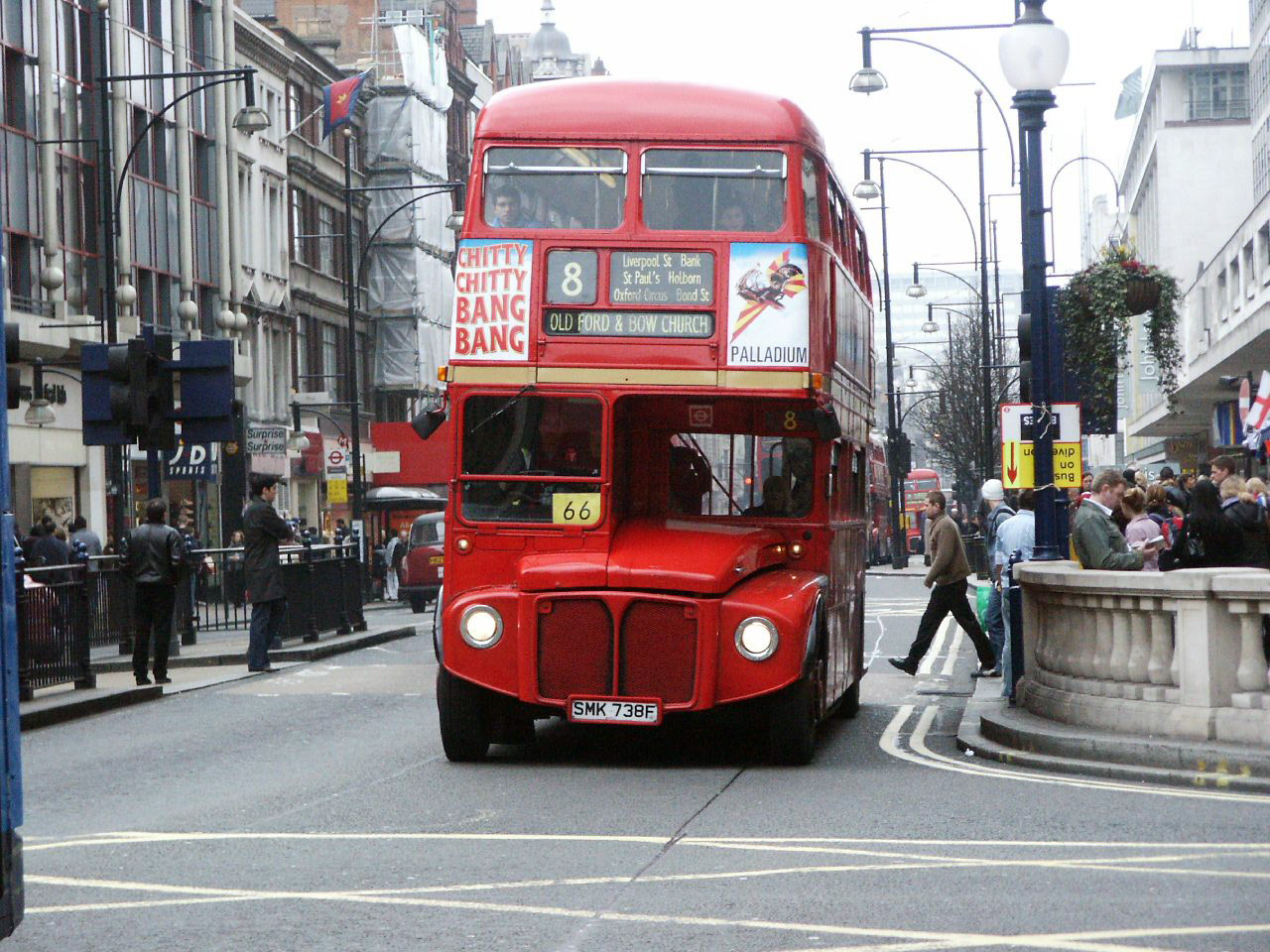
Stagecoach London AEC Routemaster at Oxford Circus in 2004

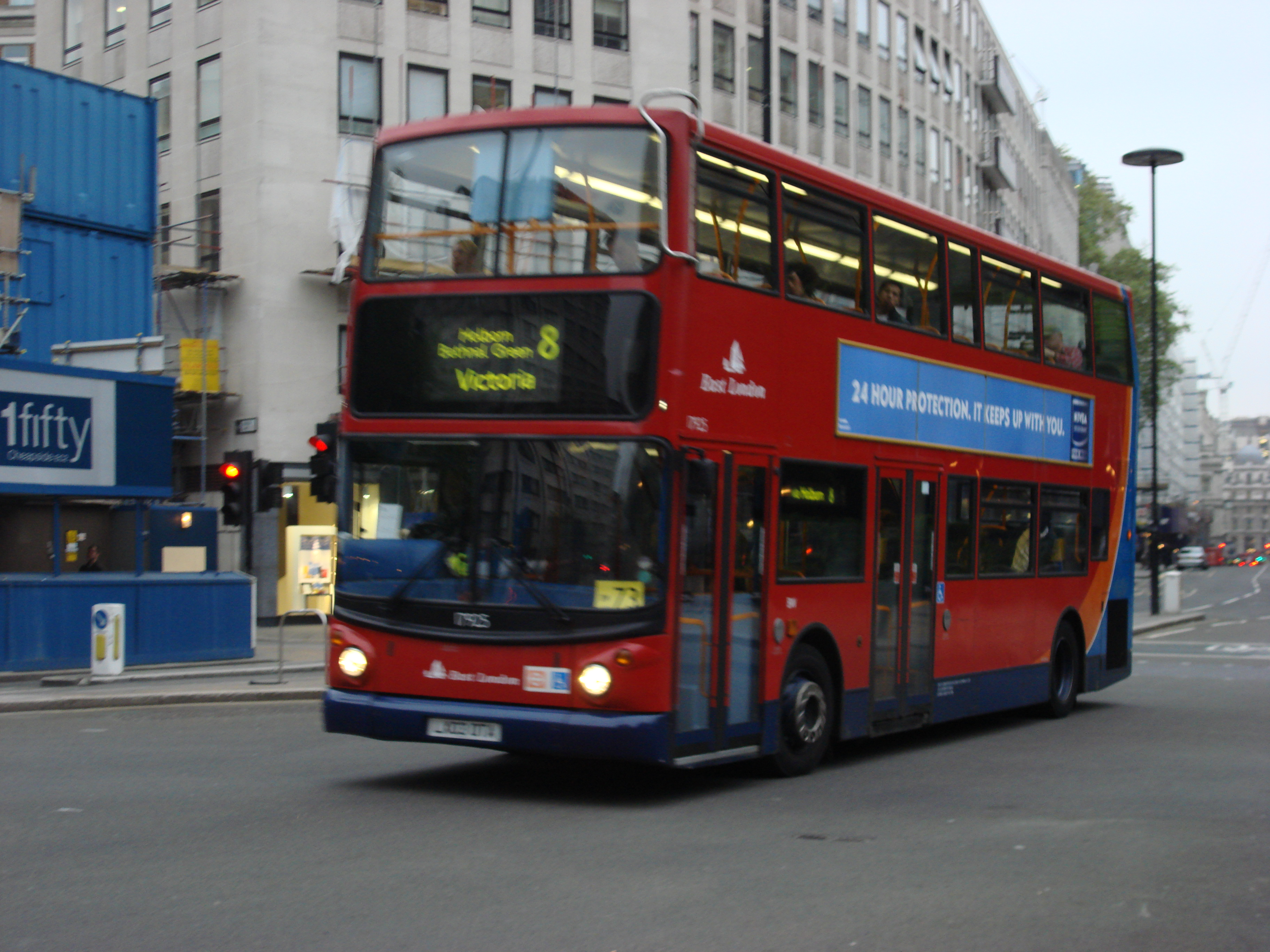
Stagecoach London Alexander ALX400 bodied Dennis Trident 2 in 2007

On 2 November 1908, the bus route number 8 was allocated to a previously un-numbered route operating between the Bush Hotel in Shepherd's Bush and Seven Kings High Road in Ilford. On 20 June 1912, routes 8 and 25 exchanged eastern ends at Bank, so that from then on route 8 operated between Willesden and Old Ford. This situation continued, apart from various westward extensions of the route to Wembley and Alperton, until 18 July 1992. At that time route 8 again was re-routed over route 25, and now operated from Victoria bus station to Bow Church via Old Ford, the same routing as the 1912 version of route 25. The western end of the route beyond Bond Street became 98.

On 3 January 1933, AEC Regent STL buses were used from Clay Hall garage. In May 1949, Leyland Titan RTWs were introduced on route 8. In January 1958, the third prototype AEC Routemaster began operation on route 8 between Willesdan and Old Ford. On 6 June 1959, the first three production Routemasters to enter service in London (RM5, RM7 and RM24) debuted on route 8 from Willesden garage.

On 27 June 2009, route 8 was curtailed west of Oxford Circus. Route C2 was extended to Victoria station as a replacement. The changes were part of Transport for London's commitment to the Mayor of London to reduce the bus flow in Oxford Street by 10% in each of 2009 and 2010.

Stagecoach London has successfully retained route 8 with new contracts starting on 26 June 2004, 27 June 2009 and 28 June 2014.

New Routemasters were introduced on 28 June 2014. The rear platform remains closed at all times except for when the bus is at bus stops.

In August 2019, the middle and rear doors on New Routemasters on route 8 became exit only with passengers only able to board through the front door.

== Current route ==
Route 8 operates via these primary locations:

- Bow Church
- Old Ford
- Bethnal Green station
- Shoreditch High Street
- Liverpool Street station
- Bank station
- St Paul's station
- City Thameslink station
- Holborn Circus
- Chancery Lane station
- Holborn station
- Tottenham Court Road
