= London Buses route 120 =

London bus route

120
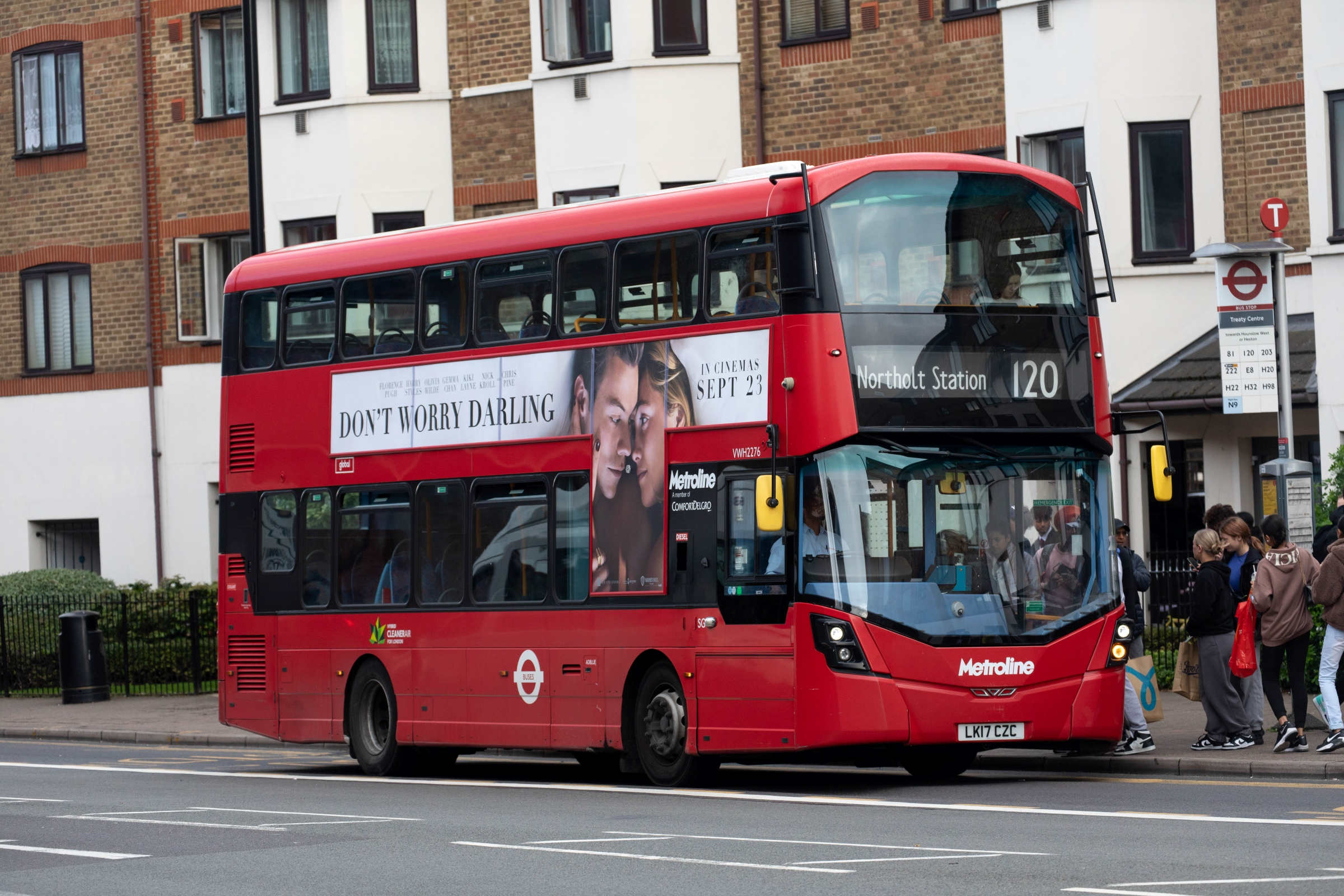
- Metroline Wright Gemini 3 bodied Volvo B5LH at the Treaty Centre in September 2022

Overview
- Operator: Metroline
- Garage: Lampton; Brentford
- Vehicle: Volvo B5LH Wright Gemini 3

Route
- Start: Hounslow bus station
- Via: Lampton; Norwood Green; Southall; Yeading
- End: Northolt station

London Buses route 120 is a Transport for London contracted bus route in London, England. Running between Hounslow bus station and Northolt station, it is operated by Metroline.

In 1994, it became the first bus route in the United Kingdom to solely use low floor, accessible buses.

== History ==
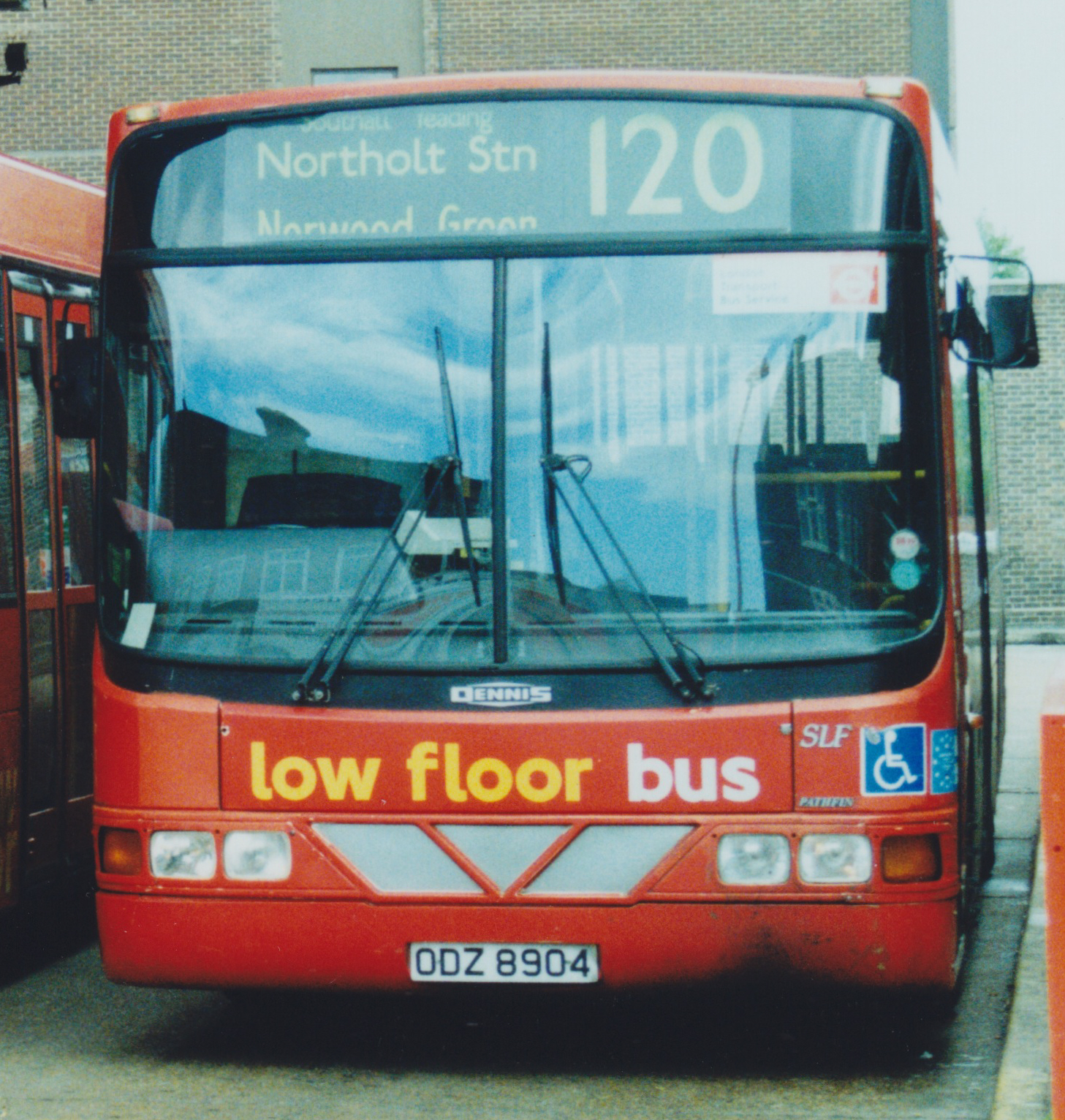
London United Wright Pathfinder bodied Dennis Lance SLF at Hounslow bus station in September 1998

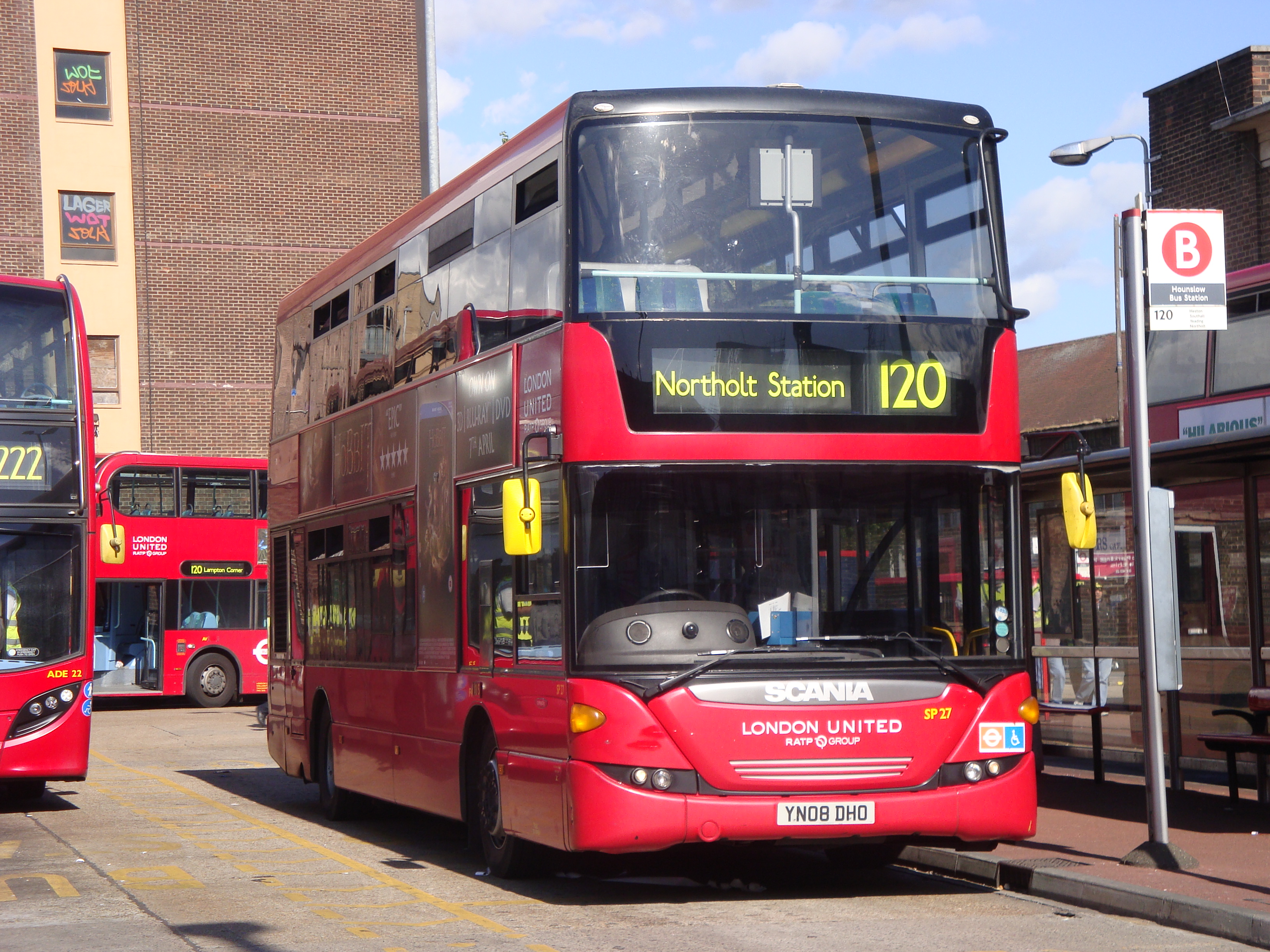
London United Scania OmniCity at Hounslow bus station in May 2014

Route 120 commenced operating on 27 January 1926. The route initially ran from the Victory, The Green, Southall to the Hussar, Staines Road, Hounslow Heath, via King Street, Norwood Road, Heston Road, Lampton Road, Staines Road, Tivoli Road and Gloucester Road to a stand in Barrack Road, returning directly to Staines Road. On Saturday afternoons and evenings and all day on Sundays it was extended from Hounslow Heath to the Red Lion, Feltham via Staines Road, Hounslow Road, and High Street, Feltham. It was operated by two single-deck K-type buses (three on Saturday pm) based at Hounslow garage. The practice until 1934 was to use suffixes to the route number for different termini: Southall to Feltham was 120, Southall to Hounslow Heath was 120A.

On 12 October 1938, route 120 was reinstated between Southall and Hounslow Heath on Monday to Saturday. Route 105 continued to provide the Sunday service to Hounslow Heath until 15 October 1939, after which it was replaced by route 120, running between Cambridge Road, Southall and Hounslow Heath. The evening service between Southall and Hayes was withdrawn on 6 December 1939, but was reinstated on 15 May 1940. On 29 June 1941 the route was extended to Hayes on Sundays, but withdrawn again over this section on 1 November 1942.

On Saturday mornings the service was like midday Mon-Friday until around noon when it was increased to every five minutes to and from Hounslow Heath, every 30 minutes to Hayes, and every ten minutes to Greenford. On Saturday afternoons 18 buses (8 on 120 and 10 on 120A) provided 16 buses an hour between Hounslow Heath and Southall, with alternate journeys projected to Greenford and two an hour going to Hayes. On Sunday mornings buses ran every ten minutes between Hounslow Heath and Southall, with alternate journeys going on to Greenford. In the afternoon there was a 5-minute service from Hounslow Heath, and a 15-minute one to Greenford. In the evening there was a 6-minute headway on the trunk section, and 4 buses an hour to Greenford, at alternately 12 and 18 minute headways. The Sunday allocation was 12 buses, all on 120A. The running time between Hounslow Heath and Southall was 23 minutes, between Southall and Hayes it was 16 minutes, and between Southall and Greenford it was 9 minutes.

On 12 October 1955, new route 232 (Hounslow Garage to Greenford, via what had been part of route 111 to Vicarage Farm Road, then Hyde Lane, and Thorncliffe Road and then the route 120A road) took over most of route 120A's service between Southall Town Hall and Greenford. Buses on route 232 were evenly spaced between route 120 journeys, except in Mon-Friday peaks, when route 232 ran every 12 minutes. Route 120A was withdrawn on Mon-Friday and Sunday, but continued on Saturday, running between Hounslow Heath and Southall Town Hall and on to Greenford during the afternoon. Route 120 was reinstated on Sundays, running between Hounslow Heath and Southall. On 16 October 1957 the 120A was withdrawn on Saturdays.

On 3 March 1975, the permanent closure of Gloucester Road at Hounslow Heath forced a diversion via Martindale Road and Corporation Avenue to Barrack Road.

The weekday service was extended on 14 August 1976 from Greenford station, via Oldfield Lane to the Lyons Maid Bridge Park factory. On 1 July 1979 the Sunday afternoon service was extended to Greenford Broadway. The Monday-Friday off-peak service was withdrawn between Greenford Red Lion and Bridge Park in September 1982, and three months later the Monday-Friday peak hour and Saturday daytime service was also cut back to Greenford Station.

On 28 November 1987, the route was extended at the Hounslow Heath end Monday to Saturday daytime, replacing the Beavers Farm Estate route 257. From Martindale Road buses ran in a loop via Beavers Lane, Salisbury Road, Green Lane and Staines Road, whence they continued via Hounslow High Street to Hounslow Bus Station. On the section of Staines Road between the Bell and Martindale Road buses ran both eastbound and westbound to both Southall or Greenford, and to Hounslow Bus Station. Moreover, alternate journeys ran direct between Lampton Road and the Bus Station, missing out Staimes Road and the Beavers Farm Estate loop. Buses serving the loop used black on yellow blinds.

On 28 April 1990, the route was withdrawn from Staines Road and the Beavers Farm Estate, cutting the link between Hounslow Heath and Southall which had existed since 1926. The service now ran from Lampton Road via High Street directly to the Bus Station. On 24 March 1993 the route was extended from Southall to Northolt station via Lady Margaret Road, Ruislip Road, Church Road and Mandeville Road to replace the cut-back route 232.

The 120 was one of the five routes in London to use the first fully accessible low floor single deckers in 1994: it gained 10 Wright Pathfinder bodied Dennis Lance SLFs. These entered service on the route on 29 January 1994, making the route the first in Britain to be run entirely with low-floor vehicles; comparable vehicles previously delivered to Merseyside PTE and Tayside Buses had been used alongside step-entrance vehicles.

Upon being re-tendered, the route was retained by London United with a new contract commencing in June 2005 London United successfully tendered to retain the route with a new contract commencing on 23 June 2012 with existing Scania OmniCitys and new Alexander Dennis Enviro400s.

== Current route ==
Route 120 operates via these primary locations:

- Hounslow bus station
- Hounslow Central station
- Lampton
- Norwood Green
- Southall station
- Southall Town Hall
- Yeading
- Northolt station
