= London Buses route 7 =

London bus route

7
- Metroline BYD BD11B in White City in August 2026

Overview
- Operator: Metroline
- Garage: Perivale
- Vehicle: BYD BD11B
- Peak vehicle requirement: 11
- Predecessors: Route 7A
- Night-time: N7

Route
- Start: East Acton
- Via: Ladbroke Grove; Paddington; Edgware Road
- End: Marble Arch station
- Length: 6 miles (9.7 km)

Service
- Level: Daily
- Frequency: About every 12 minutes
- Journey time: 25-55 minutes
- Operates: 05:25 until 00:56

London Buses route 7 is a Transport for London contracted bus route in London, England. Running between East Acton and Marble Arch station, it is operated by Metroline.

== History ==
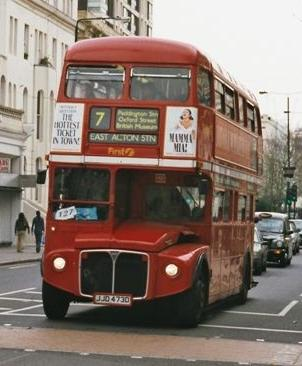
First London AEC Routemaster at Ladbroke Grove in 2002

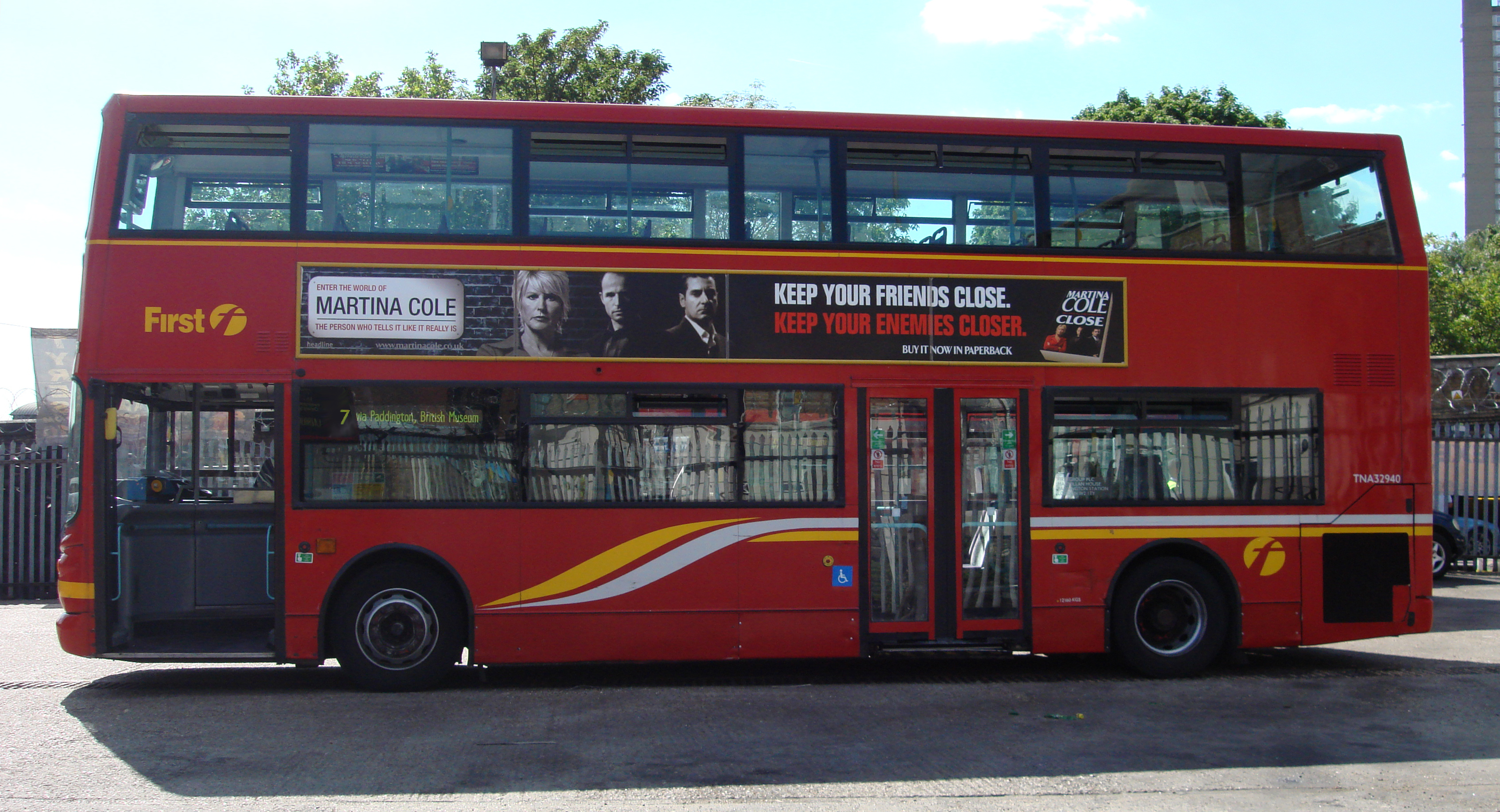
First London Alexander ALX400 bodied Dennis Trident 2 in 2007

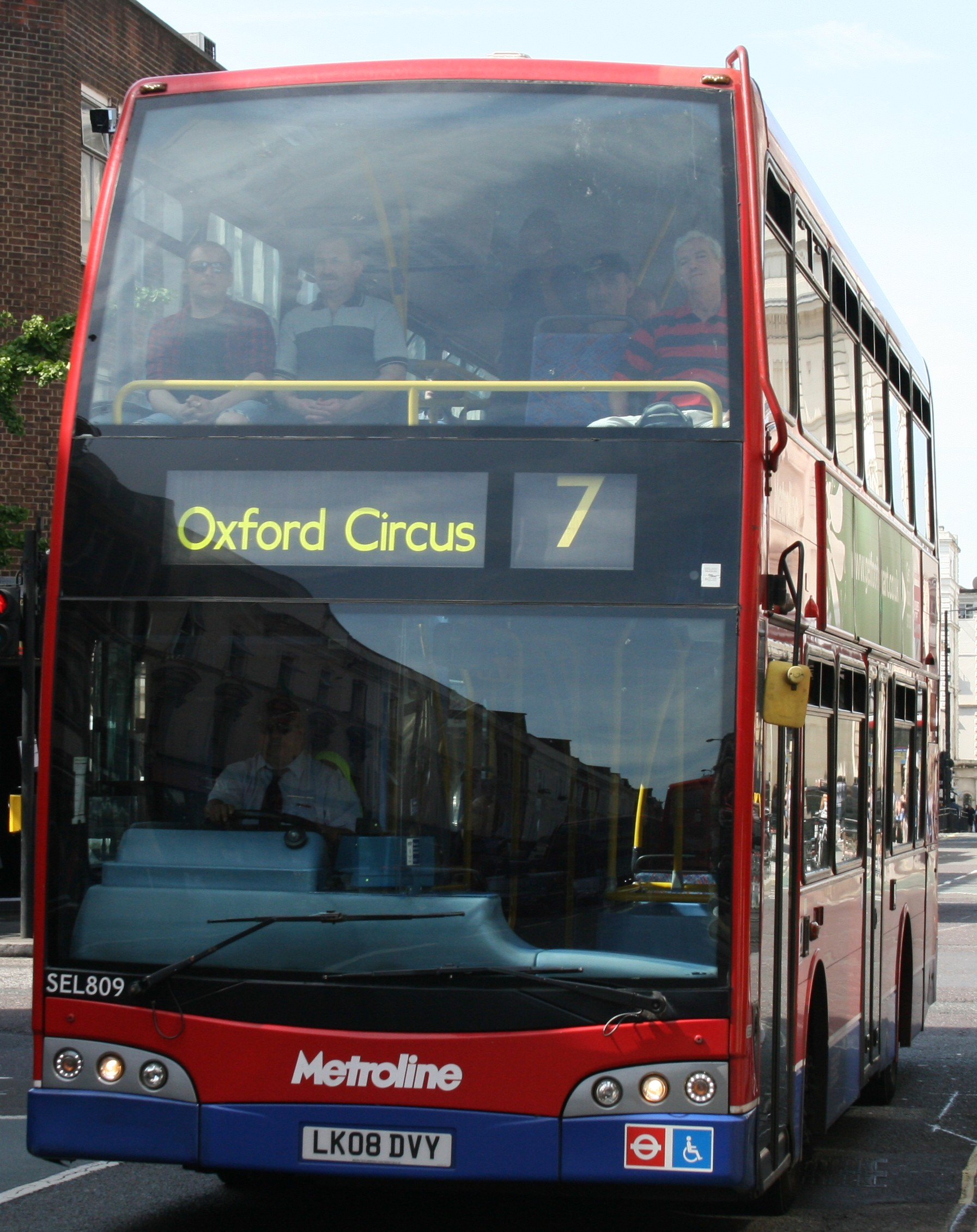
Metroline East Lancs Olympus bodied Scania N230UD in 2014

Route 7's history can be traced back to 1 November 1908, when an un-numbered daily route operating between Wormwood Scrubs and Liverpool Street station, was allocated route number 7. Between 1910 and 1920, route 7 was operated entirely by X-type vehicles. It was the only route in London to use these vehicles regularly.

On 14 August 1916, a supplementary Monday - Saturday route 7A was introduced between Wormwood Scrubs and London Bridge station. This route disappeared later in 1916 owing to Wartime shortages, but reappeared on 30 April 1917. During the 1920s, route 7 was extended to Acton and a 7B was introduced as a Waterloo station to London Bridge, Monday to Friday peak hours only service via Holborn.

On 1 December 1924, a new system of route numbering on London buses came into force under The London Traffic Act 1924. This gave the Metropolitan Police responsibility for bus operation and route numbering. Route 7 remained unchanged; the 7A was renumbered 107, and the 7B to 166. Short workings from Wormwood Scrubs were renumbered 7A. This situation remained until 3 October 1934, when the newly constituted London Passenger Transport Board instituted its own numbering system. Route 7 continued with an extension to Kew Green until 22 August 1946, when the 7A was revived from Acton to London Bridge.

Route 7 was withdrawn on 19 August 1958. From 14 October 1959, the old route 7A had its suffix removed, becoming plain 7. The service ran between Acton tram depot and London Bridge station via East Acton, Ladbroke Grove, Paddington station, Edgware Road, Marble Arch, Oxford Street, Holborn station and Bank station.

On 9 October 1963, the Saturday service of route 7 was extended from Acton to Kew Green to replace the withdrawn route 265. On 31 December 1966, the Saturday section of route 7 between Acton and Kew was replaced by route 27A. The rerouting of Red Arrow route 501 from Aldgate to London Bridge on 24 January 1970, resulted in route 7 being cut back to Bloomsbury near to Tottenham Court Road.

In 1992, the route was extended to terminate at Russell Square. The route was run with crew-operated AEC Routemasters for many years. These were replaced on 3 July 2004 by low-floor double-deckers released from route 25.

Due to the partial closure of Oxford Street for Elizabeth line construction works, the route has had its eastern terminus relocated from Russell Square to Oxford Circus on 16 June 2014.

Metroline was awarded the contract for route 7, taking over from First London on 23 June 2007 and has successfully retained the route with a new contract starting on 21 June 2014.

In May 2021, routes 7 and N7 became the first in London to use double decker hydrogen fuel cell buses. The new vehicles are Wright StreetDeck Hydroliners. The same year, the frequency of the service was reduced from 7.5 or 8 buses per hour to 5 buses per hour at peak times. A new contract, which commenced on 20 June 2026, saw the Wright StreetDeck Hydroliners displaced from route 7 to route 245 in favour of new BYD BD11Bs.

On 21 November 2025, Transport for London launched a consultation proposing to withdraw the route between Marble Arch station and Oxford Circus station as part of plans to pedestrianise Oxford Street. In March 2026, it was confirmed that the changes would proceed and they were implemented on 24 October 2026.

== Incidents ==
A serious incident occurred on 13 June 1957, when a RTL-type bus on route 7A ran into a queue of waiting passengers on Oxford Street, killing eight people. The driver had collapsed with heat exhaustion.

On 30 July 1966, Routemaster RM1768, operating on route 7, caught fire at Marble Arch. The cause was an overheated flywheel. The driver, conductor and passengers all escaped without injury.

== Current route ==
Route 7 operates via these primary locations:

- East Acton Brunel Road
- East Acton station
- Hammersmith Hospital
- Ladbroke Grove station
- Portobello Road
- Westbourne Park station
- Paddington station
- Edgware Road station
- Marble Arch station
