= Edgware Road tube station =

Edgware Road is the name of two London Underground stations near the junction of Edgware Road and Marylebone Road in Central London:

- Edgware Road tube station (Bakerloo line)
- Edgware Road tube station (Circle, District and Hammersmith & City lines), location of the 2005 London bombings

== See also ==
- Edgware tube station
