= London Buses route 98 =

London bus route

98
- Metroline BYD BD11B at the Selfridges flagship store in October 2026

Overview
- Operator: Metroline
- Garage: Willesden; Harrow Weald
- Vehicle: BYD BD11B; Volvo B5LH Wright Gemini 3
- Peak vehicle requirement: 22
- Predecessors: Route 8
- Night-time: Night Bus N98

Route
- Start: Red Lion Square
- Via: Oxford Circus; Marble Arch; Edgware Road; Maida Vale; Kilburn
- End: Willesden bus garage
- Length: 7 miles (11 km)

Service
- Level: Daily
- Frequency: About every 7-12 minutes
- Journey time: 35-70 minutes
- Operates: 05:30 until 00:44

London Buses route 98 is a Transport for London contracted bus route in London, England. Running between Red Lion Square and Willesden bus garage, it is operated by Metroline.

== History ==
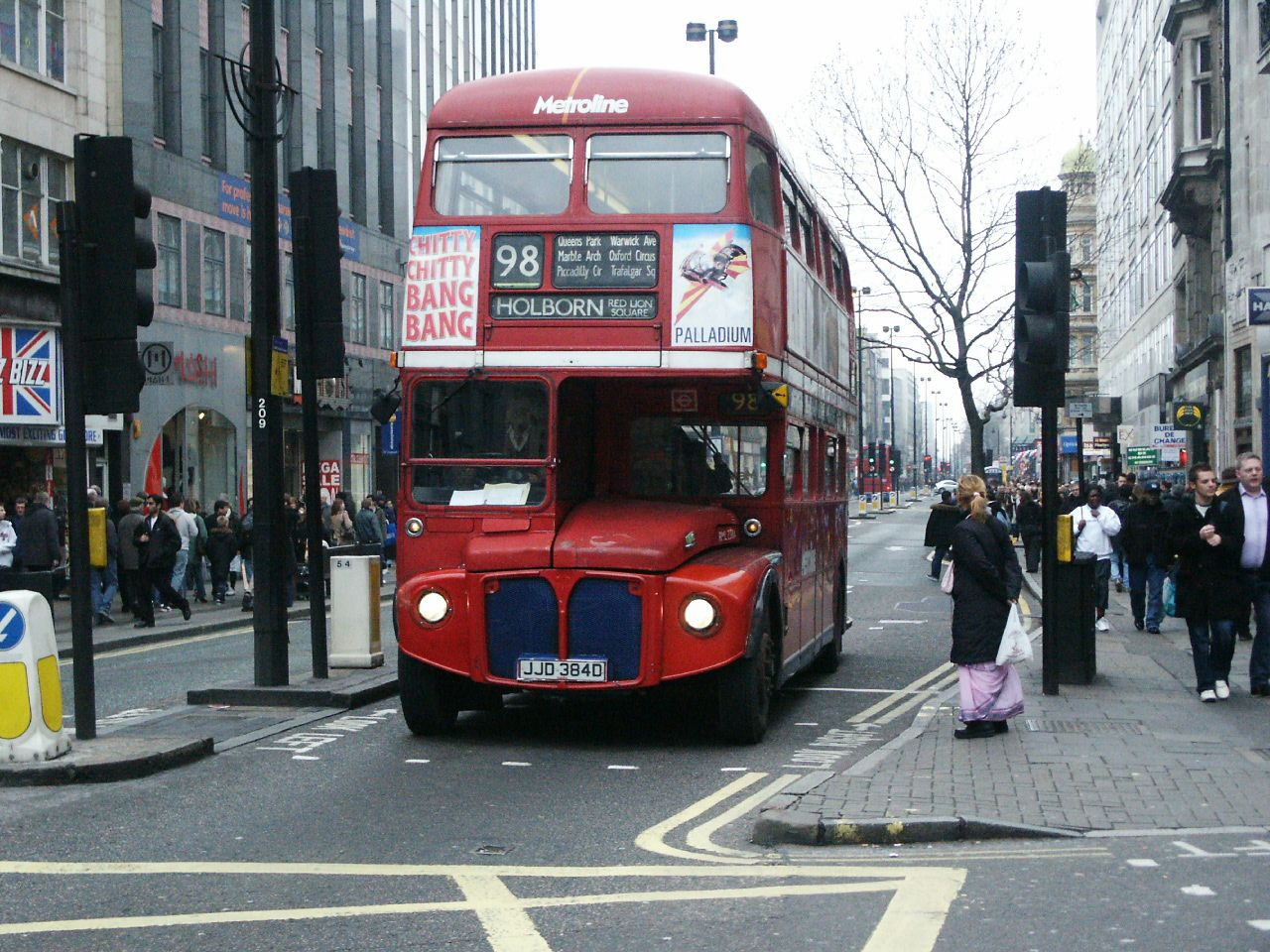
Metroline AEC Routemaster on Oxford Street in March 2004

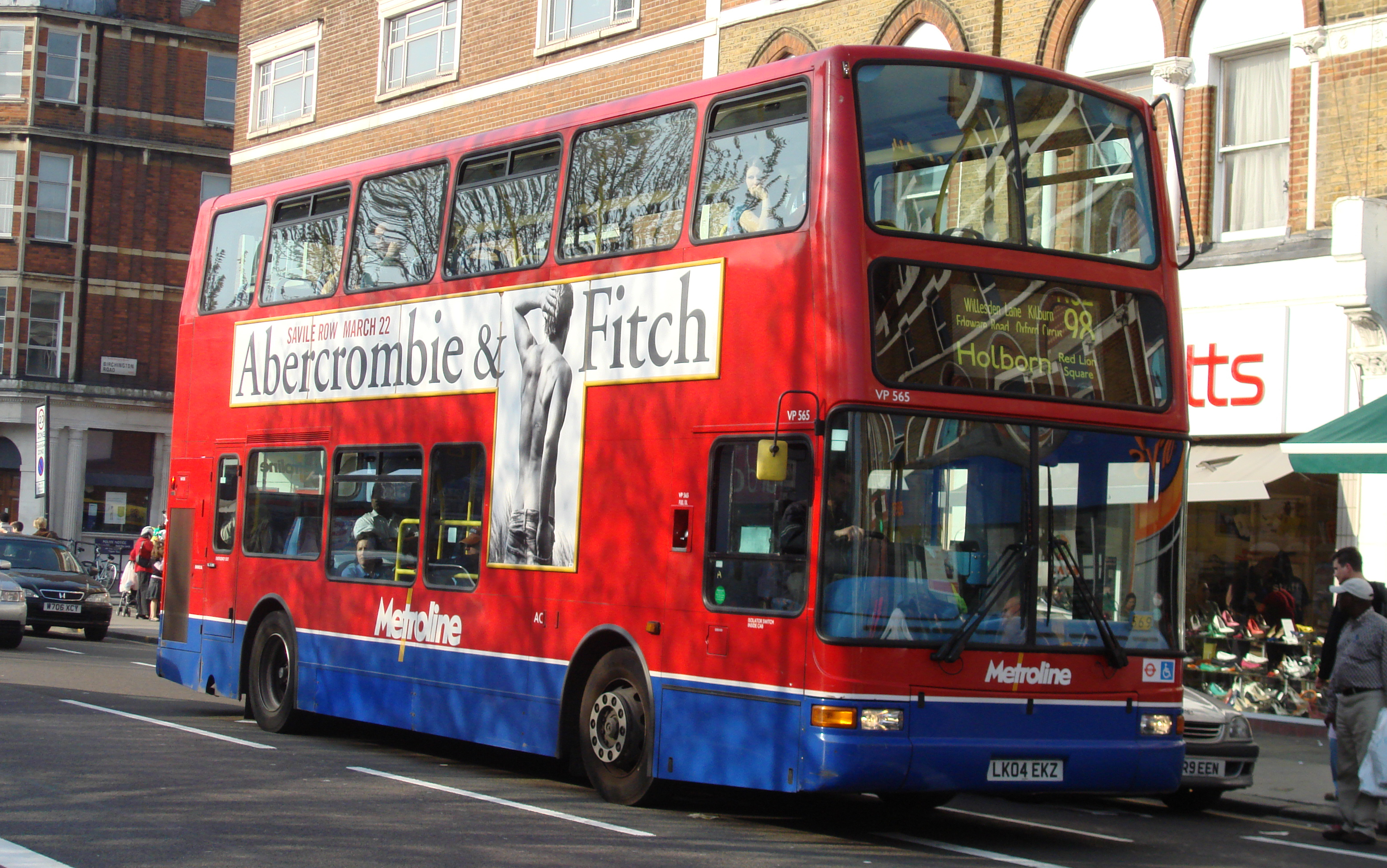
Metroline Plaxton President bodied Volvo B7TL in Kilburn in September 2007

Route 98 commenced on 18 July 1992 to replace route 8 between Willesden bus garage and Oxford Circus, before continuing to Holborn. The route has always been operated by Metroline's Willesden bus garage. It was initially operated by AEC Routemasters on Mondays to Saturdays in the daytime and Dennis Darts, MCW Metrobuses and Leyland Titans on Sundays and late evenings.

On 27 March 2004 routes 6 and 98 were converted to driver-only operation, with the AEC Routemasters replaced by Plaxton President bodied Volvo B7TLs.

In April 2016 the first five BYD K8SR double-decker electric buses in the world since trolleybuses started operating on the route as part of a pilot scheme. They were operated from Willesden bus garage.

On 21 November 2025, Transport for London launched a consultation proposing to reroute the route between Marble Arch station and Oxford Circus station via Wigmore Street instead of Oxford Street as part of plans to pedestrianise Oxford Street. In March 2026, it was confirmed that the changes would proceed and they were implemented on 25 October 2026.

== Current route ==
Route 98 operates via these primary locations:

- Red Lion Square
- Tottenham Court Road station
- Oxford Circus station
- Wigmore Street
- Marble Arch station
- Edgware Road station
- Maida Vale station
- Kilburn High Road station
- Brondesbury
- Willesden Green station
- Willesden bus garage
