= Metroline =

London bus operator

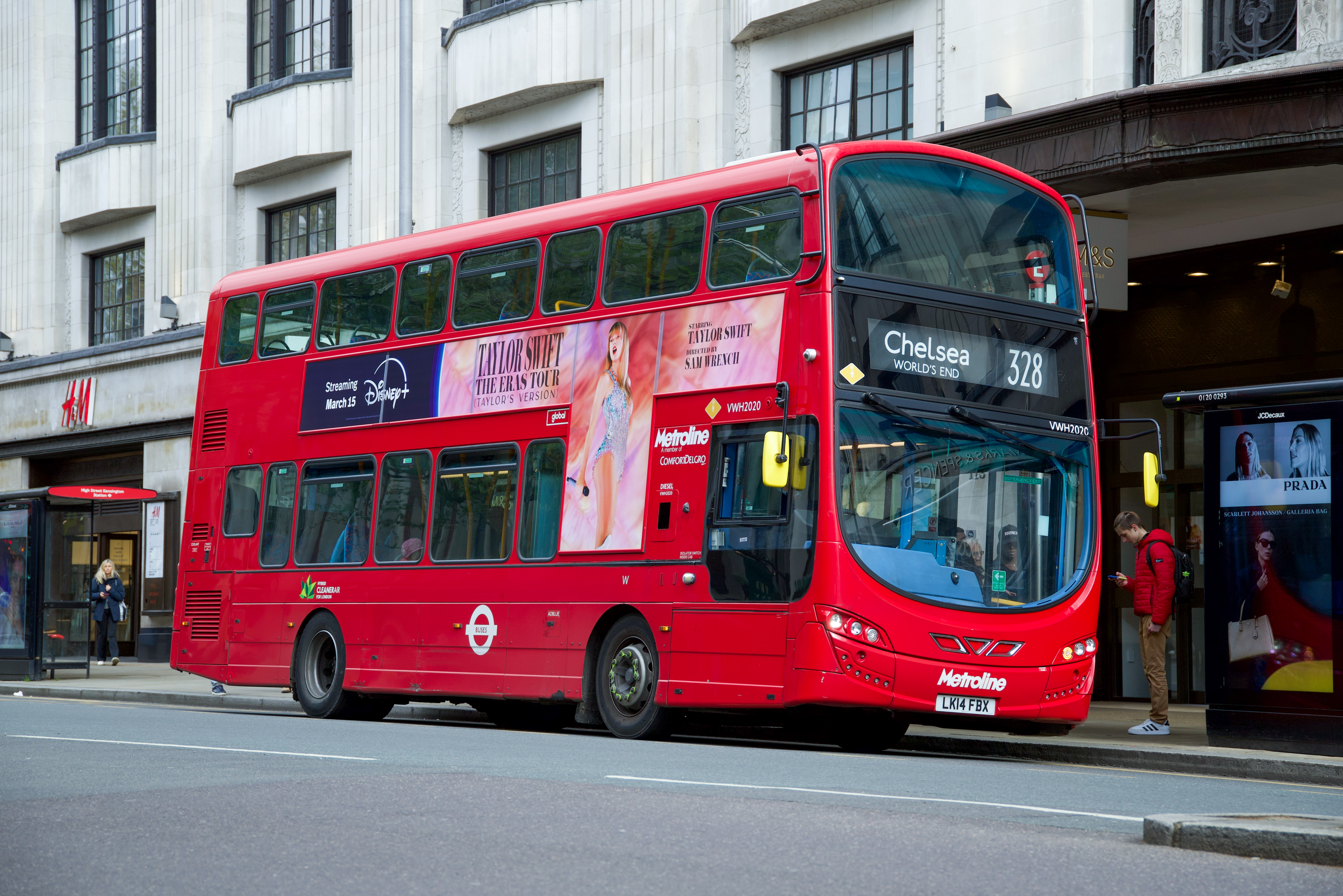
- Wright Eclipse Gemini 3 bodied Volvo B5LH on route 328 at High Street Kensington station
- Parent: ComfortDelGro
- Founded: 1 April 1989; 37 years ago
- Headquarters: Cricklewood
- Service area: Berkshire; Buckinghamshire; Greater London; Hertfordshire
- Service type: Bus services
- Routes: 118
- Hubs: North London; North-west London; West London
- Depots: 14
- Fleet: 1,515 (March 2025)
- Fuel type: Diesel, Electric, Hybrid and Hydrogen
- Website: www.metroline.co.uk

Metroline is a bus operator operating primarily in Greater London and partially in Berkshire, Buckinghamshire and Hertfordshire. It is a subsidiary of ComfortDelGro and operates bus services for London Buses under contract to Transport for London. Operations are run under two registered companies, Metroline Travel Limited and Metroline West Limited.

== History ==
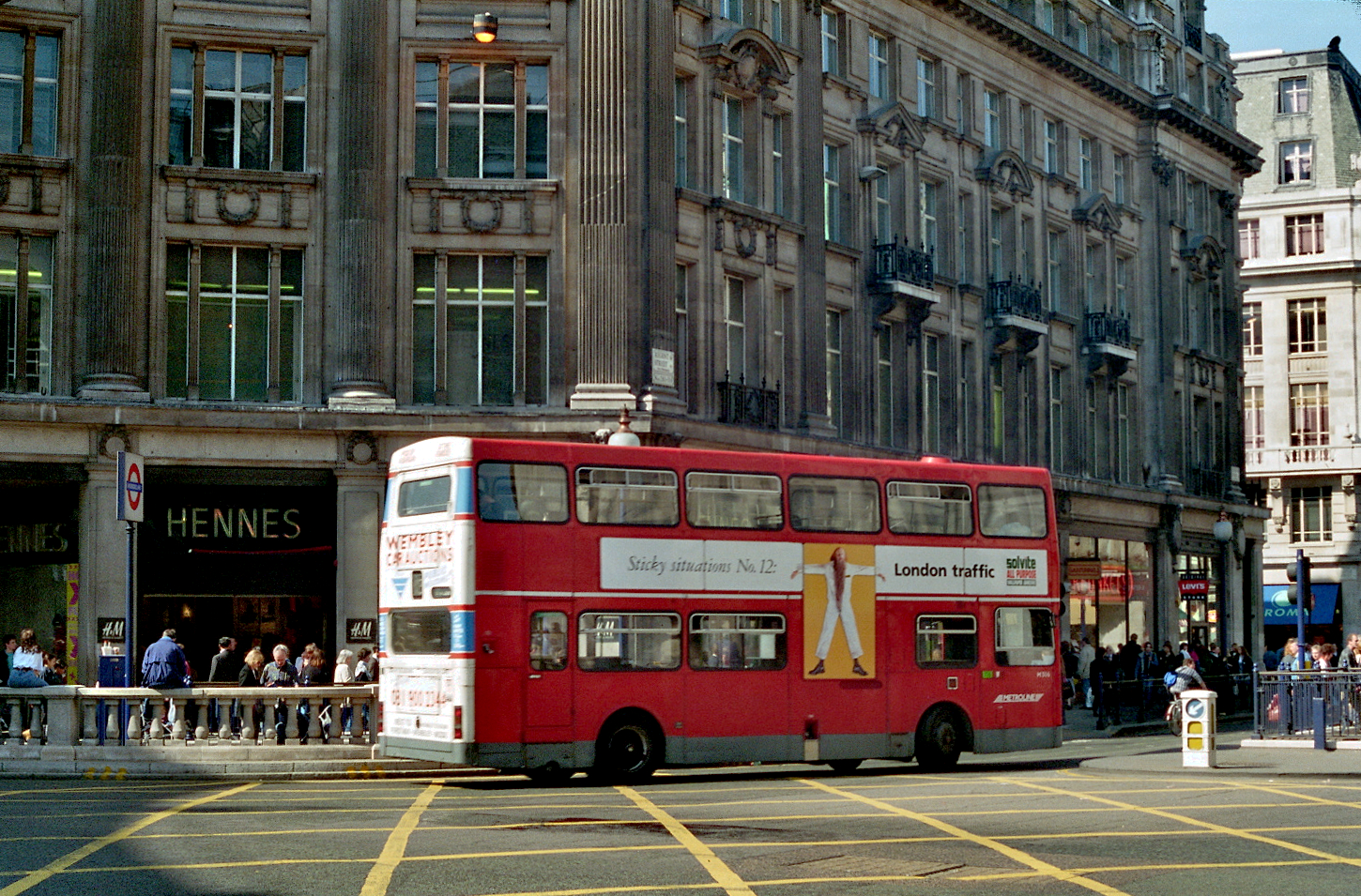
MCW Metrobus on Oxford Circus in April 1995

In April 1989, London Buses was divided into 11 separate business units, one of which was Metroline. As part of the privatisation of London bus services, Metroline was sold in October 1994 to a management buyout worth £20 million (equivalent to £42,200,000 in 2025).

Shortly following its privatisation in December 1994, Metroline became the first ex-London Buses company to expand when it bought Atlas Bus & Coach, regaining route 52 as part of the purchase, which it had earlier lost under tendering to Atlas. Metroline later purchased MTL London in July 1998, and in February 2000, was eventually sold to ComfortDelGro for £73.8 million (equivalent to £140,253,000 in 2025).

In August 2004, ComfortDelGro purchased Thorpes with four TfL bus routes, a network of mobility bus services and 66 buses, followed by in November 2004 Armchair Passenger Transport with seven TfL bus routes and 86 buses. The coach business of Armchair was absorbed into ComfortDelGro-owned Westbus UK in 2006. Thorpes and Armchair initially retained their existing names before being rebranded to Metroline in January 2007.

In April 2012, Metroline were investigated after reports from meetings stated that defect sheets were not being filled out correctly, and defects not being corrected. With 50% of all buses having a defect, and 25% of having a PG9 notice, which indicates "serious defects" which "affect the roadworthiness of the vehicle and renders it unsafe". A whistleblower said: "Typical PG9 defects include faulty handbrakes or failures in the steering and central braking systems — all of which can cause accidents. Yet when I raised my concerns within the company, managers did not act. I believe they did not do so because taking buses off-road for repairs would cost them money."

In June 2013, Metroline purchased First London's Alperton, Greenford, Hayes, Uxbridge and Willesden Junction garages with 494 buses.

In March 2024, Metroline was awarded the final tranche operations of the Bee Network in Greater Manchester by Transport for Greater Manchester, forming a new company named Metroline Manchester, which commenced operations on 5 January 2025.

Metroline celebrated 25 years of being under the ownership of ComfortDelGro with a celebration being held at Cricklewood garage on 26 June 2025.

== Liveries ==
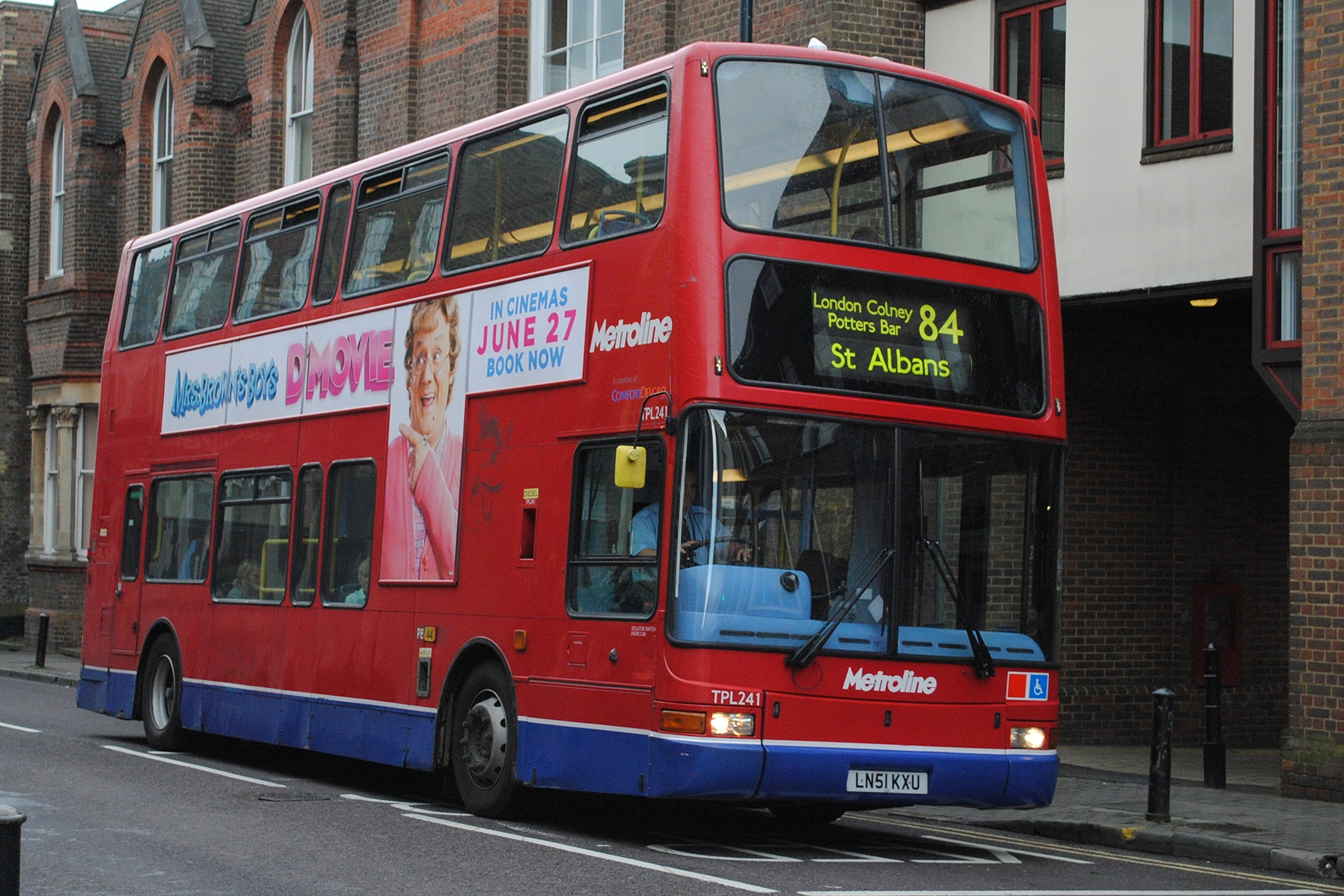
Plaxton President-bodied Dennis Trident 2 on commercial route 84 in St Albans with original livery in June 2014

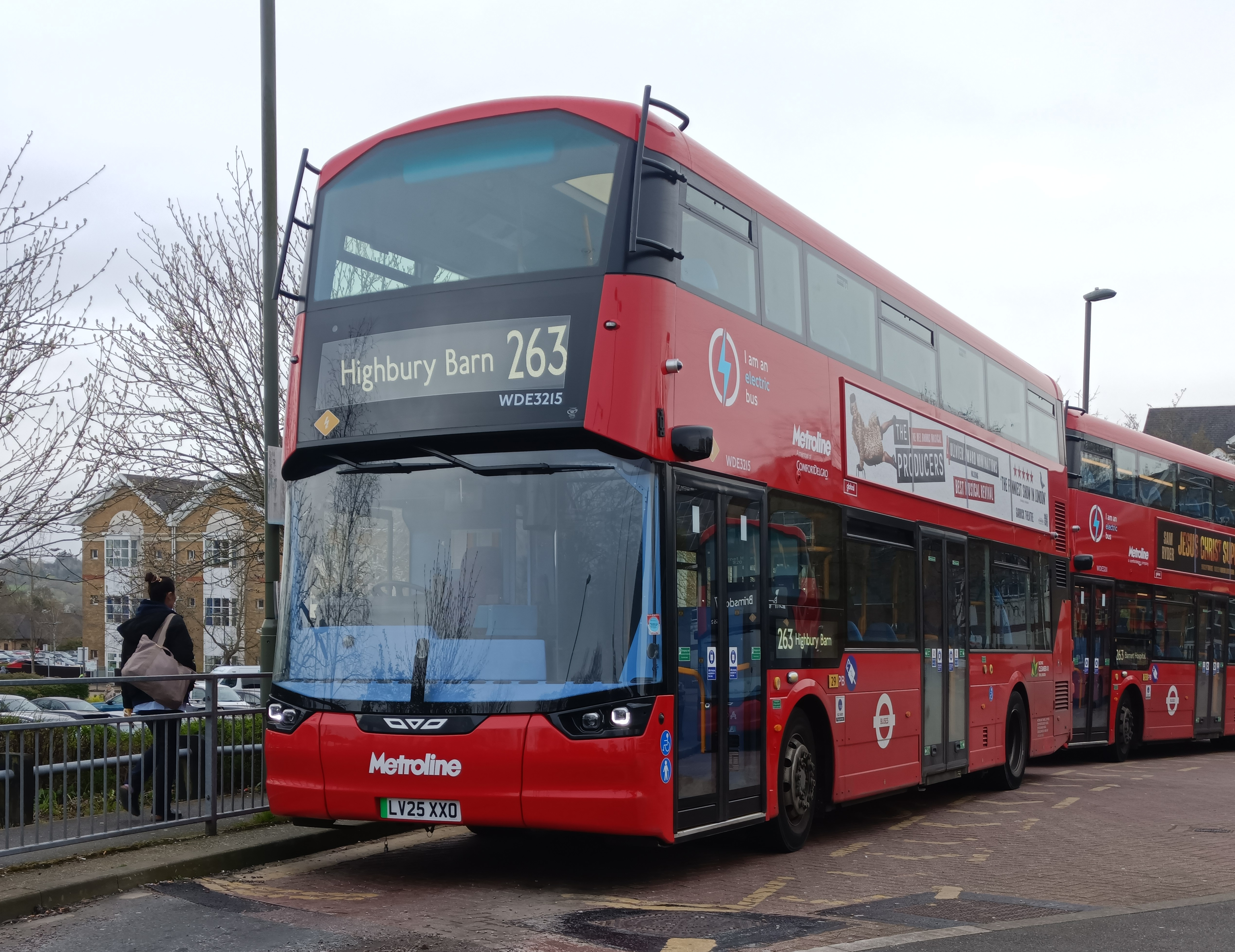
Wright StreetDeck Electroliner on route 263 at Barnet Hospital with current livery in March 2026

When privatised, Metroline adopted a livery of red with a dark blue skirt. This was briefly changed to light blue in the mid-2000s before the dark blue was reinstated. In June 2009, Metroline adopted an all-red scheme to comply with Transport for London requirements. In 2014, a blue, white and red commercial livery was introduced on buses dedicated to non-Transport for London services.

== Garages ==
Metroline operates 14 garages across two legal entities: Metroline Travel Limited and Metroline West Limited.

=== Metroline Travel Limited ===
==== Athlon Road (AO) ====
Athlon Road garage operates routes 224, 245 and 483.

==== Brentford (AH) ====
Brentford garage operates routes 9, 120, 190, 237, 481, 635, E2, E8, H91 and N9.

The original Brentford garage was opened in 1990 by Armchair Passenger Transport, initially as a base for the company's coach operations before housing buses for the company's recently won route 260 contract. The garage expanded in 1993 with the acquisition of a storage yard on Commerce Way from BRS Truck Rental. In November 2004, Armchair was bought out by ComfortDelGro, although the company continued to operate TfL buses separately under the Armchair name until being integrated into Metroline in 2007.

A planning application was submitted by Metroline in 2022 for the building of a new £19 million Brentford garage on the site of the current garage as part of the wider redevelopment of the Brentford Lock West area. Construction commenced shortly afterwards, with the new garage, capable of housing over 100 buses, opening in July 2024.

==== Cricklewood (W) ====
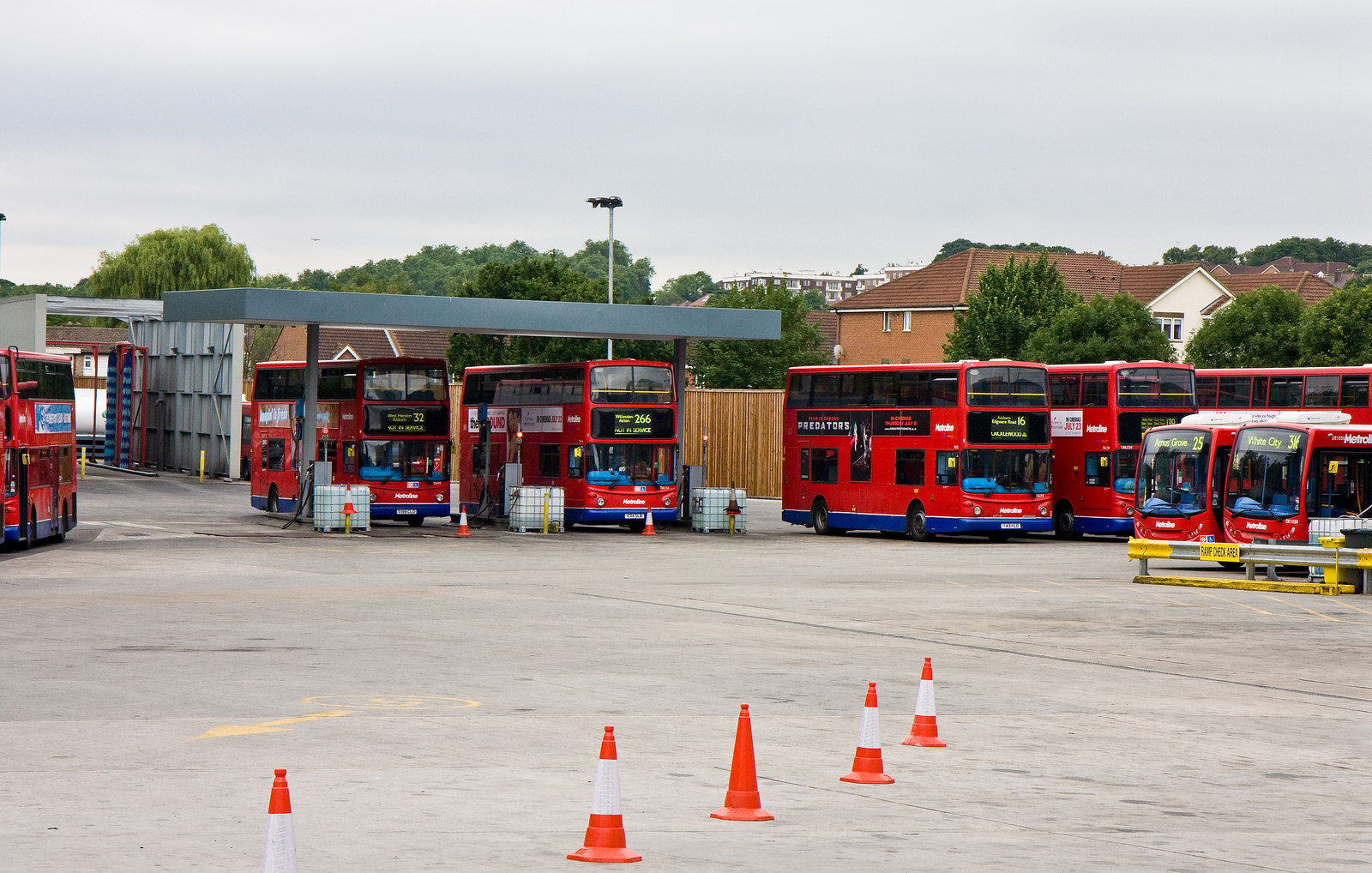
Cricklewood garage forecourt, July 2010

Cricklewood garage operates routes 16, 32, 112, 139, 143, 189, 210, 266, 268, 324, 328, 631, 632, H2, H3, N32 and N266.

Cricklewood garage opened for service in May 1905 and was originally called Dollis Hill. It was the first motorised depot used by the London General Omnibus Company and is one of London's oldest bus garages. London's first night bus service, route 94 between The Crown pub in Cricklewood and Liverpool Street Station, was first operated from the garage on 15 July 1913, running at a frequency of every 20 minutes from 12:40 am until 9:00 am.

Cricklewood garage was rationalised in 1990, with Metroline's services and engineering based at the garage being moved to Edgware garage. Expansion work at Cricklewood, however, saw the garage turned back into a full-scale operation able to host bus services with upgraded facilities in 1992, at the expense of Edgware garage being earmarked for closure amid a rationalisation of operations by Metroline.

In 2007, bus parking was temporarily relocated to a site on the opposite side of Edgware Road to allow work to start on the replacement of the original buildings with a modern structure. In January 2009, bus parking was transferred back to the main site following the completion of the works, with the site being designated as both Metroline's head office as well as the European headquarters of ComfortDelGro.

==== Edgware (EW) ====
Edgware garage operates routes 113, 142, 204, 240, 251, 606, 642 and N113.

When Edgware garage was first opened by the London General Omnibus Company in 1925 it had space for 24 buses, but there was plenty of room adjacent to the then recently built underground station. In 1939 a new building was erected next to the original one, which was to become the new bus station, while the remaining open parking area was used to store vehicles for the trolleybus replacement programme.

In 1984 a new 100-bus garage was built on old railway land at a cost of £4.5 million (equivalent to £14,657,000 in 2025). However in November 1992, Edgware garage was earmarked for closure, with buses due to be moved to Cricklewood as it was to become a fully functioning garage with new facilities. The outdoor parking area and the bus station then became a midibus outstation in 1993, with a new bus wash and light maintenance facilities provided in the yard.

In 1999, London Sovereign, which had won some recent tenders in the North West London area, took on a 10-year lease on half of Edgware garage and invested in new maintenance facilities to replace its former base at Borehamwood. In late 2000, Metroline moved back into the other half of the garage, making it one of the few garages to be shared by two operators.

In 2025, Metroline announced that Edgware garage operates only Electric buses on its routes.

==== Harrow Weald (HD) ====
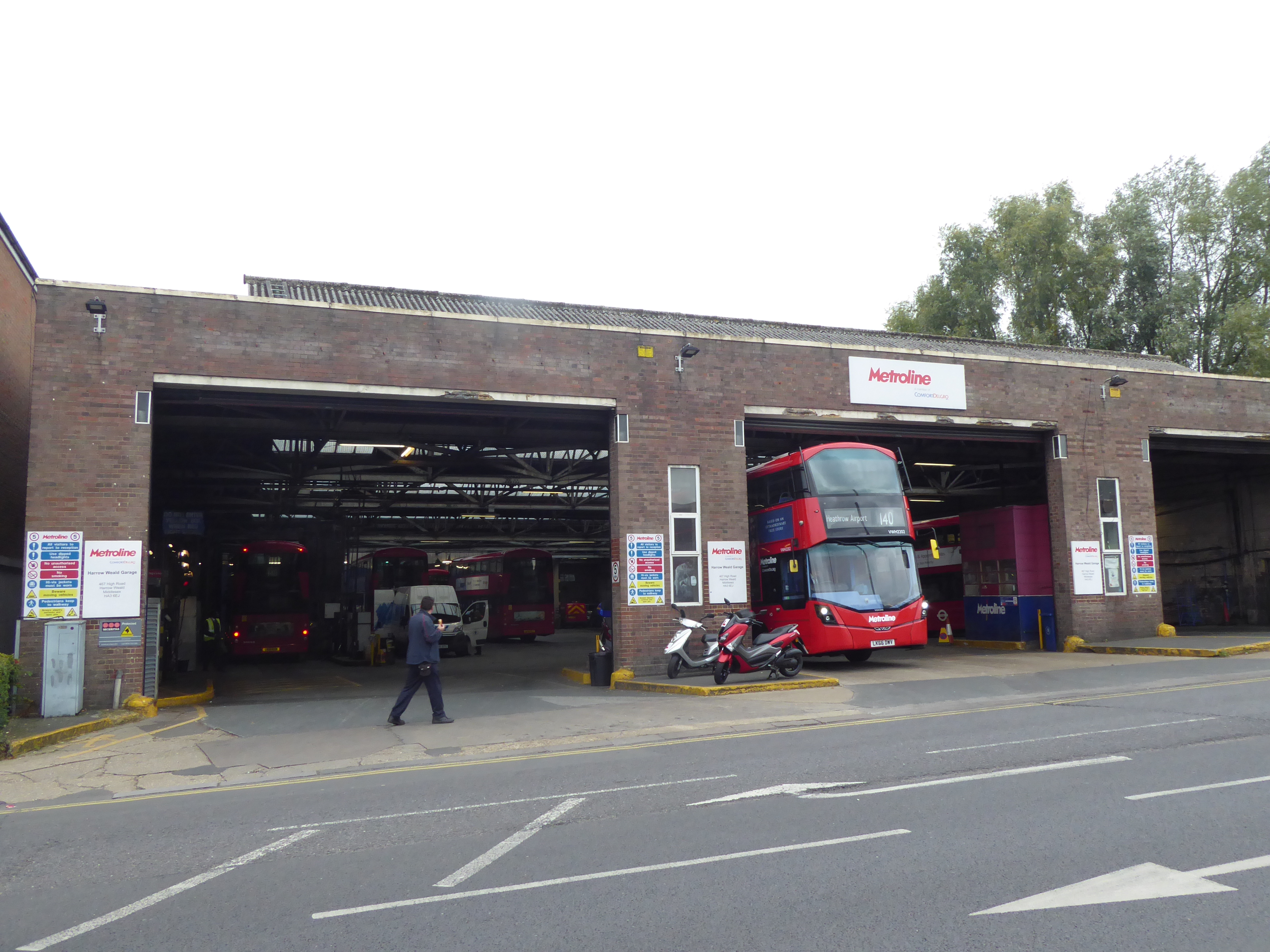
Harrow Weald bus garage from the High Road, September 2017

Harrow Weald garage operates routes 98, 140, 182, 186, 258, N98 and N140.

Harrow Weald garage was opened in 1930 by the London General Omnibus Company to replace the much smaller South Harrow garage. The new garage had to be extended over the forecourt just two years later to provide additional space. In its earlier years the garage was used by experimental vehicles including the Daimler CH6s and the first diesel bus (ST).

In 1987, Harrow Weald was the base for the new Harrow Buses operation set up by London Regional Transport, which had won tenders for a new local network as a prelude to the privatisation of London bus services. 30 new MCW Metrobuses, the only new buses for the operator among a handful of second-hand purchases, were leased to the company upon its launch. Harrow Buses, however, quickly proved to be a highly unsuccessful operation, halving operations three years later after retaining only five of twelve tendered bus routes and being nicknamed "Harrowing Buses" by members of the public. Harrow Weald garage survived the eventual collapse of Harrow Buses and passed to Metroline, and by 1994, just short of 60 buses were based there. The garage also carries out engineering work on buses based at Edgware garage.

==== Holloway (HT) ====
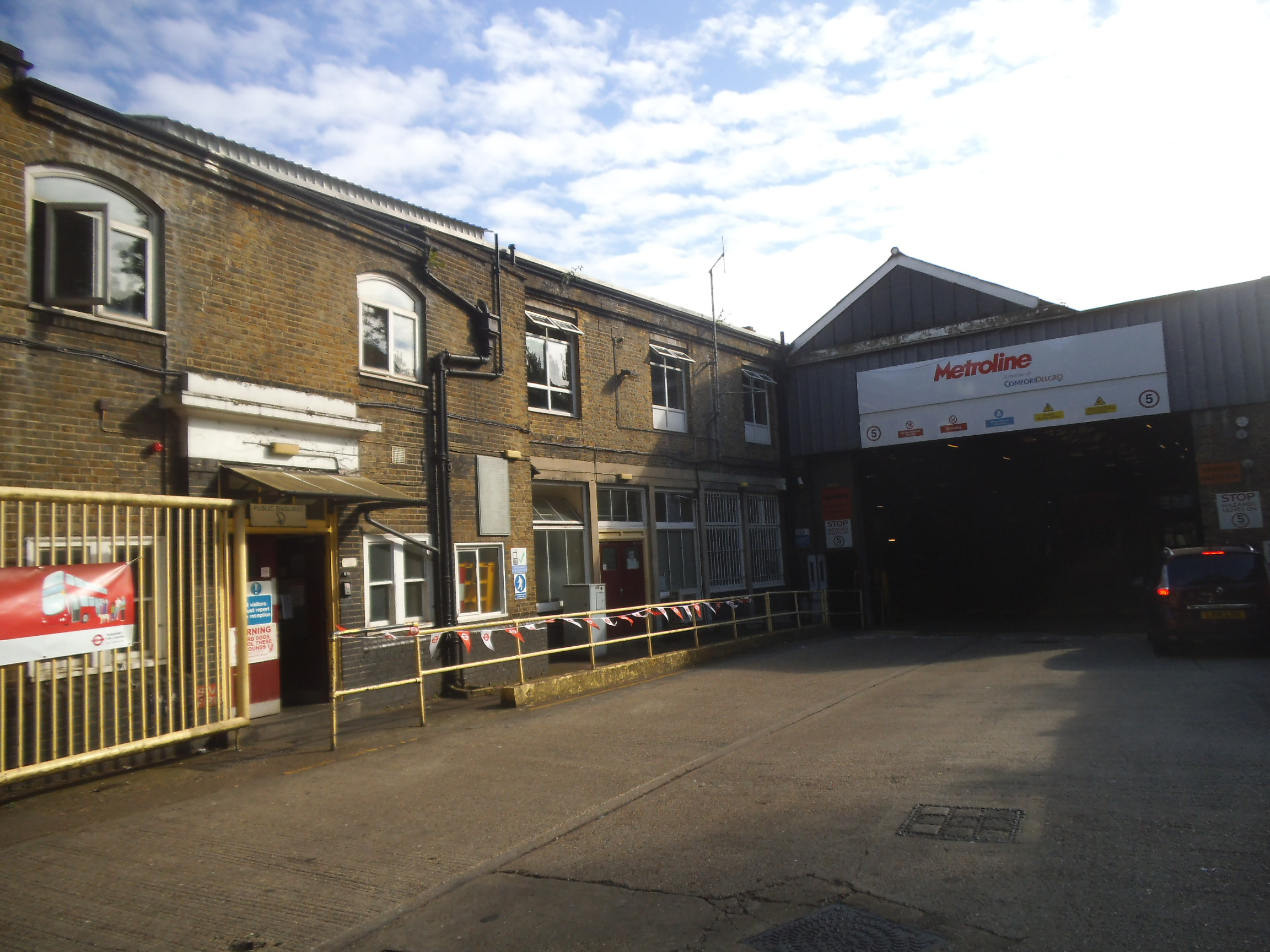
Entrance to Holloway bus garage, July 2016

Holloway garage operates routes 4, 17, 43, 46, 153, 234, 274, 390, 393, 603, C11, W7 and N20.

Originally opened as Holloway Tram Depot in 1907, it was the largest of the London County Council's sheds, with space for 336 trams. It was renamed Highgate in 1950, by which time it was a trolleybus depot, in order to avoid confusion with Holloway (J) garage, and then back to Holloway in 1971 following the closure of the original Holloway garage The garage then had an allocation of 210 buses, although this would progressively drift downwards.

Upon the breakup of London Regional Transport in April 1989, Holloway garage passed to the London Northern subsidiary, which was purchased by MTL in October 1994; operations were subsequently rebranded to MTL London. In 1993, MTL London's Chalk Farm garage closed, and the resulting transfer of five routes into the garage meant Holloway was once again full. The garage passed to Metroline with the sale of MTL's London operations in August 1998, and today, the garage is almost at capacity levels with around 200 buses allocated.

==== King's Cross (KC) ====
King's Cross garage operates routes 30 and 274.

==== Lampton (SG) ====
Lampton garage operates routes 81, 120 and H32.

Lampton garage, also known and coded as Spring Grove, opened on 27 July 2019 when Metroline took over the operation of route 81. The garage opened on the site of a Westbus coach depot.

==== Perivale (PV) ====
Perivale garage operates routes 7, 83, 90, 297, 483, N7 and N83.

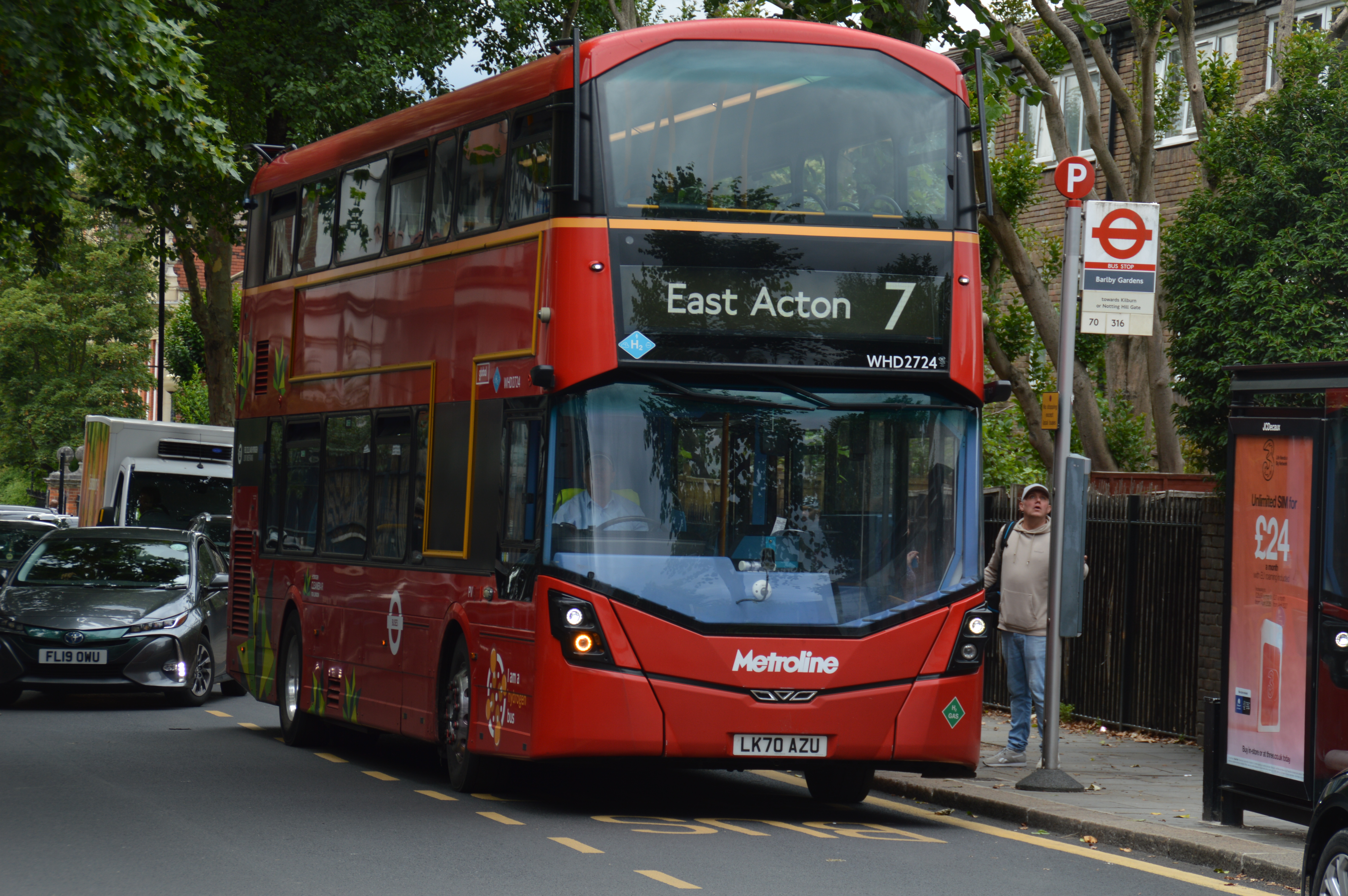
Perivale garage operates the world's first hydrogen double decker buses

Perivale garage, originally known as Perivale East, first closed on 23 June 2012, with the garage's route 70 passing to First London following the closure. However, the garage reopened four years later on 6 August 2016. The garage was renamed to Perivale with the closure of Perivale West garage in 2022.

Perivale is home to Metroline's fleet of Wright StreetDeck Hydroliner double-decker buses, the first of the type to operate in England. These are operated on routes 7, 245 and N7 and were launched at the garage following a delay due to manufacturing shutdowns as a result of the COVID-19 pandemic in July 2021, with hydrogen refuelling stations installed by Danish engineering firm Nel Hydrogen and fuel supplied Air Liquide.

==== Potters Bar (PB) ====
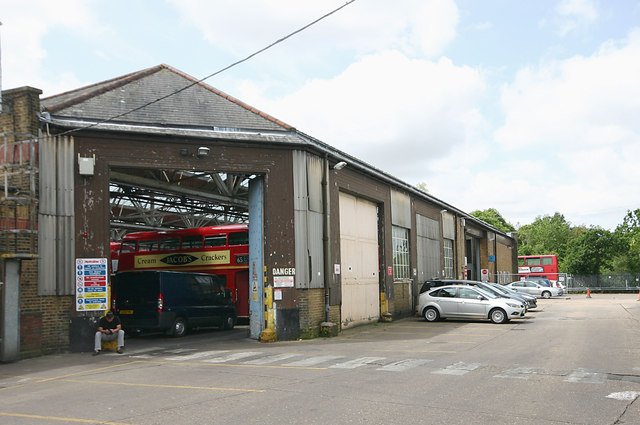
Potters Bar garage and forecourt, July 2015

Potters Bar garage operates routes 107, 134, 231, 263, 313, 317, 327, 382, 384, 491, 617, 626, 629, 634, N263, W8 and W9.

Opened in 1930 at a cost of over £48,000 by the London General Omnibus Company subsidiary 'Overground', Potters Bar garage was nearly closed in the 1960s as it was too far north to be useful to the London Transport "red bus" network. It survived this attempt, however it soon faced closure again in the 1980s in the aftermath of deregulation. This time it was saved after workers accepted a revised pay agreement and the depot tendered for and won Hertfordshire County Council commercial routes.

Upon the break-up of London Regional Transport in April 1989, Potters Bar garage also passed to the London Northern subsidiary. The garage passed to Metroline with the purchase of MTL's London operations in August 1998.

A major fire broke out at Potters Bar garage on 22 May 2022, destroying six buses but resulting in no injuries. Drivers were able to move the majority of the garage's buses away from the fire. Two of the buses destroyed were Optare MetroDecker EVs, also in service with Go-Ahead London and RATP Dev Transit London, causing a nationwide recall of the type.

==== Willesden (AC) ====
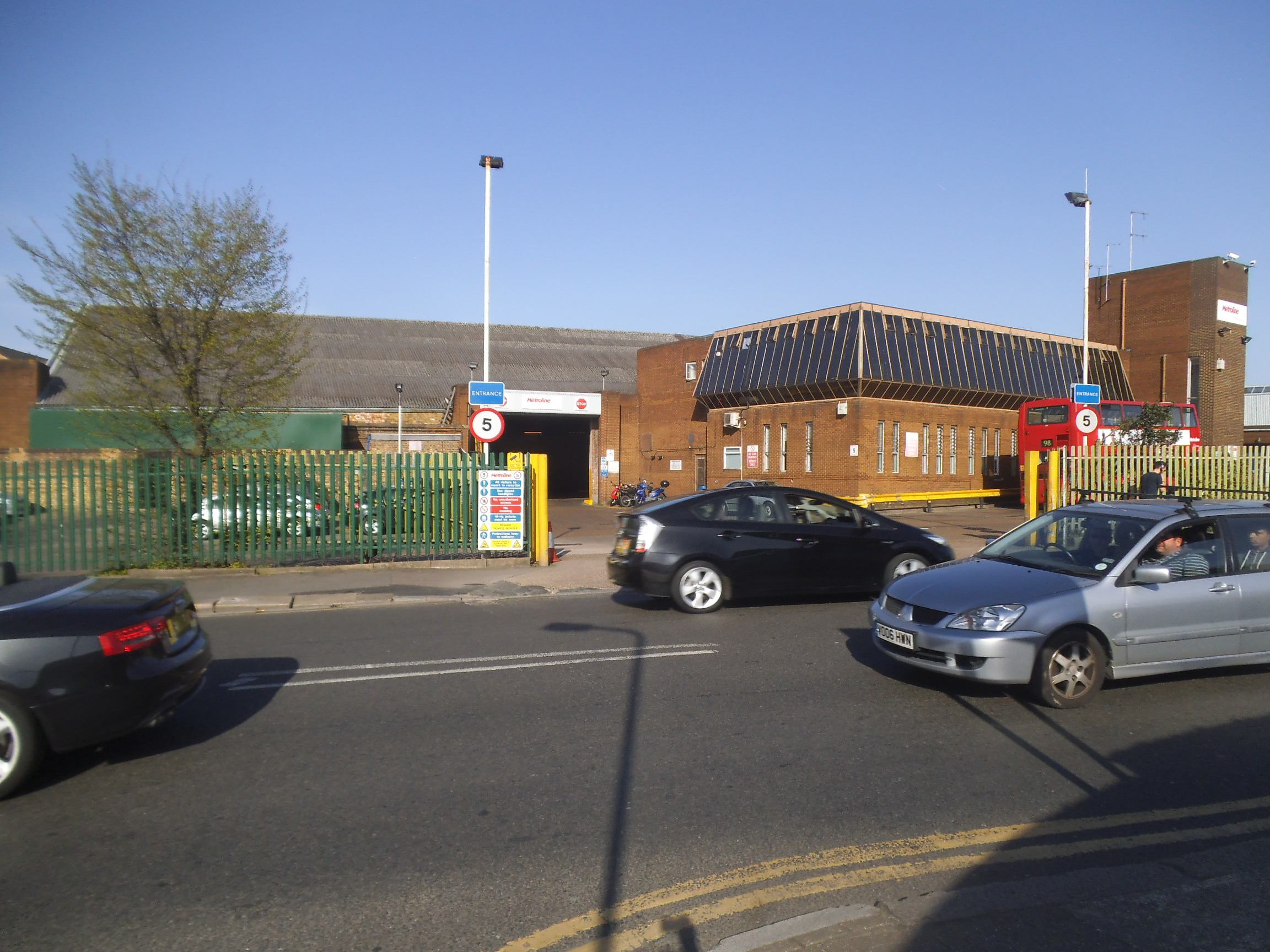
Willesden bus garage as seen from Pound Lane, April 2015

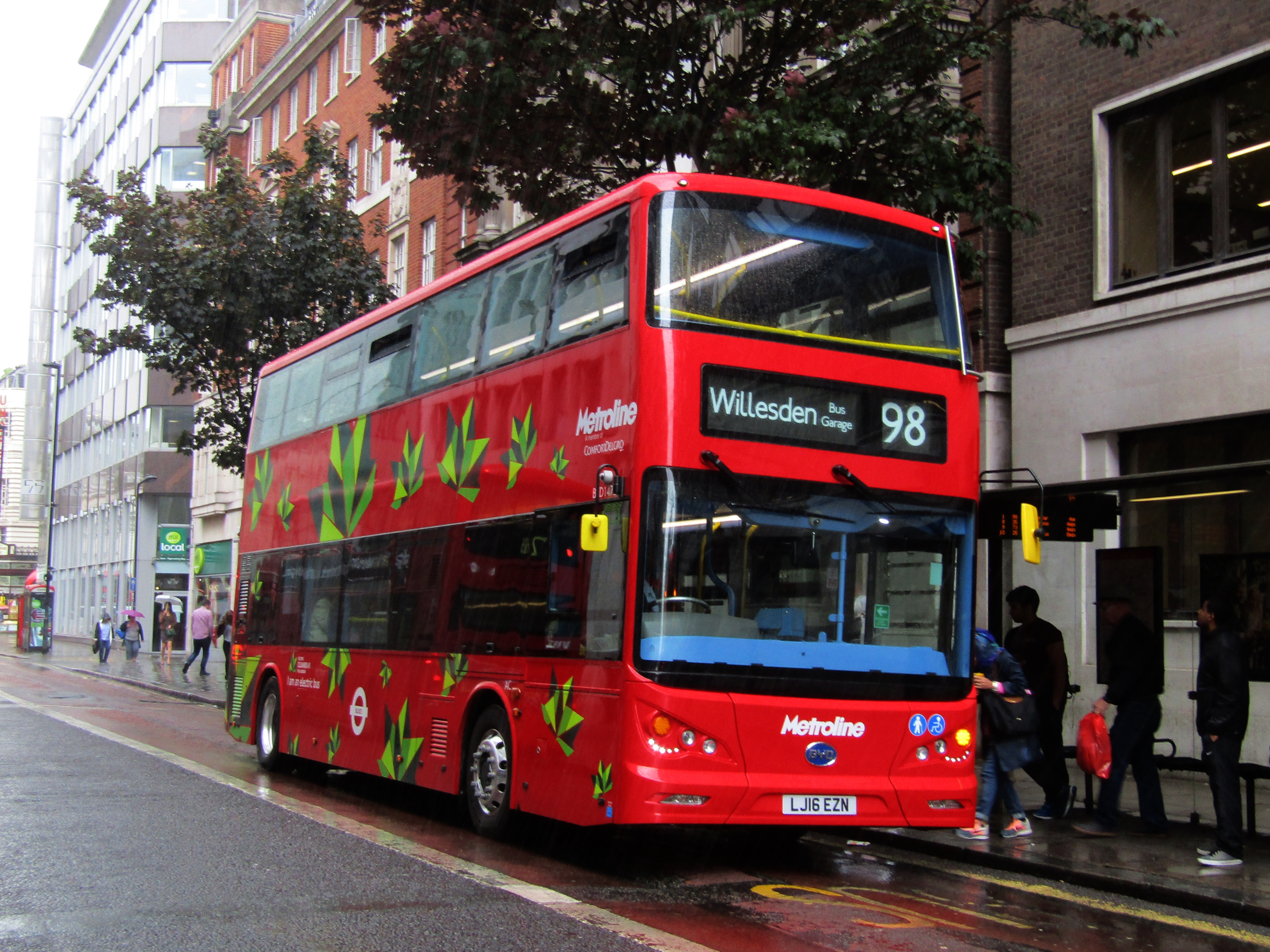
London's first battery electric double-decker buses, five BYD K8SRs, were trialled on route 98

Willesden garage operates routes 6, 52, 98, 260, 302 and 460.

Opened by the London General Omnibus Company in October 1912, Willesden garage was used for major motorbus chassis overhauls until Chiswick Works opened in 1921. This role was revived in World War II when Willesden was also used to provide major body overhauls for London Transport. The garage was largely rebuilt in 1975, expanding its capacity from 90 to 120 buses, and the garage eventually passed to Metroline in April 1989 as a result of the break-up of London Regional Transport.

Willesden garage was home to a handful of notable experimental vehicles in the Metroline fleet. Prototype AEC Routemaster RML3 was allocated to the garage in 1958, with the garage later home, albeit briefly, to the first production Routemasters on route 8 in 1959; Routemasters were retained at Willesden until 2004 on route 6 and route 98. Following Metroline's purchase by ComfortDelGro, Willesden operated a former SBS Transit Alexander bodied Volvo Olympian that had been imported from Singapore on route 260, being modified to UK standards as part of an evaluation into whether more could be imported to help Metroline replace MCW Metrobuses.

Willesden was London's first bus garage to operate battery electric double-decker buses, taking delivery of five BYD K8SRs in March 2016 for trial use on route 98.

After having trialled a system involving audio-visual alarms and reflective tape on the route in early 2018 as part of Transport for London's Bus Safety Innovation Challenge, 24 buses on Willesden's route 98 received "Vehicle Avoidance Lateral Lights" (VALLs) during 2018 as part of Transport for London's Bus Safety Challenge, with audio-visual alarm systems and reflective tape installed in an attempt to reduce pedestrian injuries on Oxford Street.

=== Metroline West Limited ===
Metroline West Limited is the legal operating name for Metroline's bus garages that were acquired with the purchase of five First London garages in 2013. As of April 2024, it now operates three bus garages.

==== Greenford (G) ====
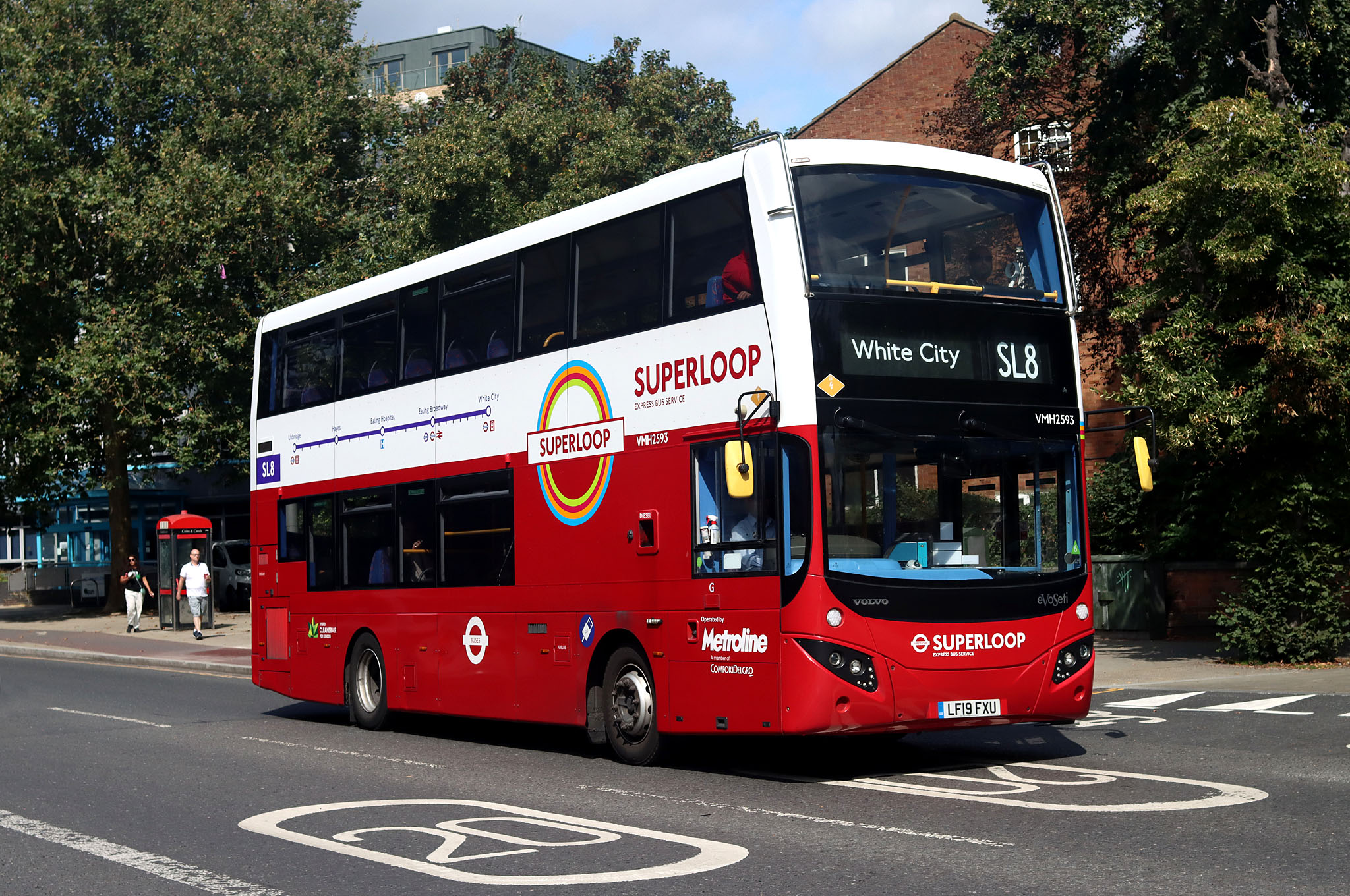
Route SL8, the first Superloop service to commence operations in July 2023, is based from Metroline's Greenford garage

Greenford garage operates routes 92, 95, 282, 640, E1, E9 and SL8.

Greenford bus garage is part of an Ealing London Borough Council depot and was first used in March 1993 as a midibus base. The opening of Greenford garage led to the closure of another garage in Hanwell, and by 1995, Greenford was operating 110 midibuses. The standard vehicles the garage in the late 1990s were Wright bodied Renault midibuses and Marshall minibuses, however both types had a bad reputation and did not last long in the CentreWest fleet.

From late 2003 until 14 March 2009, Ealing Community Transport operated route 195 from the Greenford depot, using garage code EY.

Greenford garage was the first bus garage in London to operate a London Superloop express bus service when route 607 was renumbered SL8 on 15 July 2023. Buses allocated to the service are MCV EvoSeti bodied Volvo B5LHs branded in a red and white livery with a route map on each side of the bus.

==== Uxbridge (UX) ====
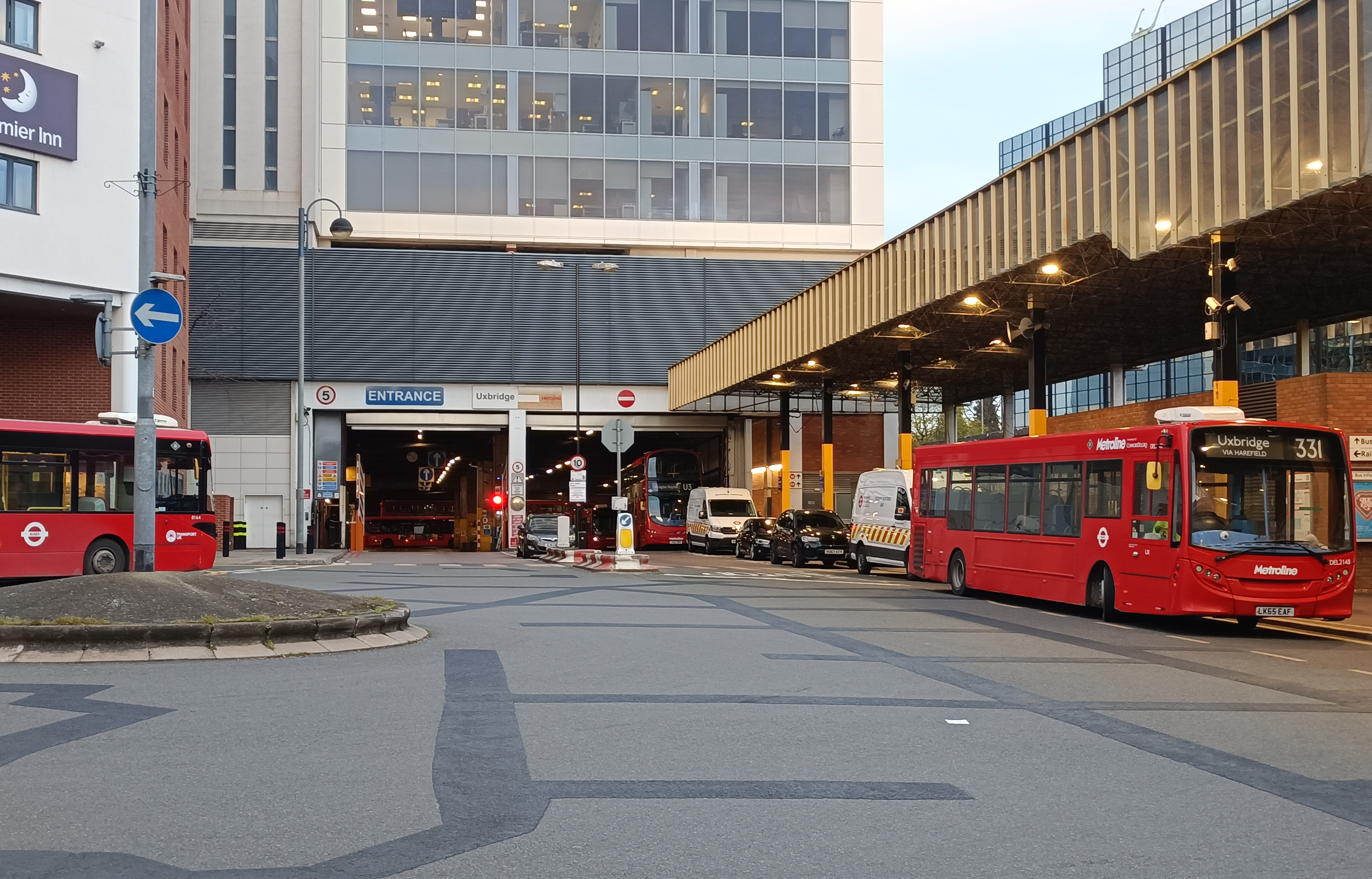
Uxbridge garage as seen from Uxbridge station, March 2026

Uxbridge garage operates routes 114, 222, 331, 695, 697, 698, A10, H13, U1, U2, U3, U4 and U10.

The original Uxbridge garage was located around half a mile outside Uxbridge itself on the Oxford Road and was built by the London General Omnibus Company in 1921. The garage passed to Thames Valley a year later, eventually being handed back to London General on 31 December 1928. When the Greater London Council was created in 1965, Uxbridge was one of only three London Transport Central Area that fell outside the boundaries of the new Greater London, instead located in the former county of Middlesex.

Following the Second World War, it was planned for Uxbridge garage to be rebuilt entirely. This, however, remained shelved, with the garage instead extended over an open parking area during 1954. A new Uxbridge garage was planned shortly afterwards, although construction work did not begin until 1979. The new garage, located next to Uxbridge tube station and occupying the lower ground floor of a multi-use development, opened in late 1983.

After passing to the CentreWest subsidiary in 1989, Uxbridge garage began operating the U-Line network of local routes using 16 seater Alexander bodied Mercedes-Benz midibuses in an initiative by London Regional Transport. Buses based at the depot were rebranded from using CentreWest fleetnames to being branded as Uxbridge Buses. The growth of use of the U-Line services over the years since 1989 has meant that larger buses have been put into service on these routes, with double-deckers being moved from Hanwell in March 1993.

Uxbridge garage also operated the busy routes 207 and 607, the latter of which received a fleet of refurbished East Lancs Greenway bodied Leyland Nationals branded for the service in 1992. In 1994, the garage was allocated some of London's first low-floor buses, these being Wright Pathfinder bodied Dennis Lance SLFs with CentreWest branding for route 222.

==== Willesden Junction (WJ) ====
Willesden Junction garage operates routes 28, 187, 206, 223, 228, 316, 487, H17 and N28.

== Former garages ==
=== Alperton (ON) ===
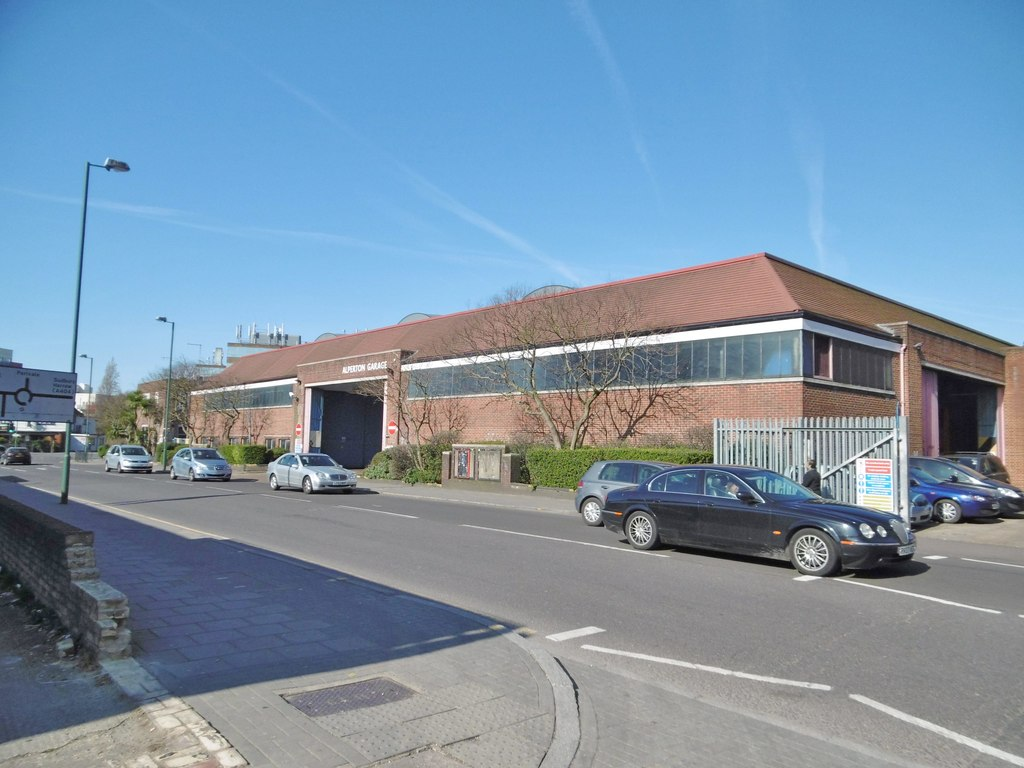
Alperton bus garage in April 2016

Before its closure in September 2021, Alperton garage operated routes 83, 483 and N83.

The garage, located adjacent to the Piccadilly line tube station of the same name, was one of three garages built by the London Passenger Transport Board as part of the board's New Works Programme. When Alperton garage opened in June 1939, it had an allocation of 59 STL double-deckers that had been reallocated from the Cricklewood, Hanwell, Harrow Weald and Willesden garages. Alperton's headroom made the garage one of the few able to take utility Guy Arabs, and at one stage, these made up its complete allocation. Alperton garage was enlarged between 1976 and 1978, the extension of which encompassed an adjacent former Underground substation, as well as the site of London Transport's Lifts and Escalators department.

Alperton passed to the CentreWest subsidiary with the break-up of London Regional Transport in April 1989. After CentreWest had become the first London Buses subsidiary to be privatised in a management buyout in September 1994, buses based at Alperton were branded Challenger as opposed to using the CentreWest Buses brand. By 1995, Alperton was also performing most of the maintenance for the Centrewest operation and had also become the home of the training fleet. In June 2013, it was one of six First London garages that were sold to Metroline.

On 10 September 2021, Alperton garage closed to make way for redevelopment, with a Farewell Open Day being held the following day.

=== Hayes (HZ) ===
Before its closure in April 2017, Hayes garage operated route U5. The garage closed in 2017, with route U5 passing to Abellio London, today based at a new garage on Dawley Road in Hayes, opened in 2022. Today it is in use with Westbus Coach Services, who were formerly based at the site now known as Lampton (SG).

=== Perivale West (PA) ===
Perivale West transferred to Metroline with the purchase of Thorpes in 2004. Before its closure in March 2022, Perivale West garage operated routes 31 and 90. The garage today is home to Metroline's Central Engineering & Logistics Facility (CELF) and driver training facilities.

== Fleet ==
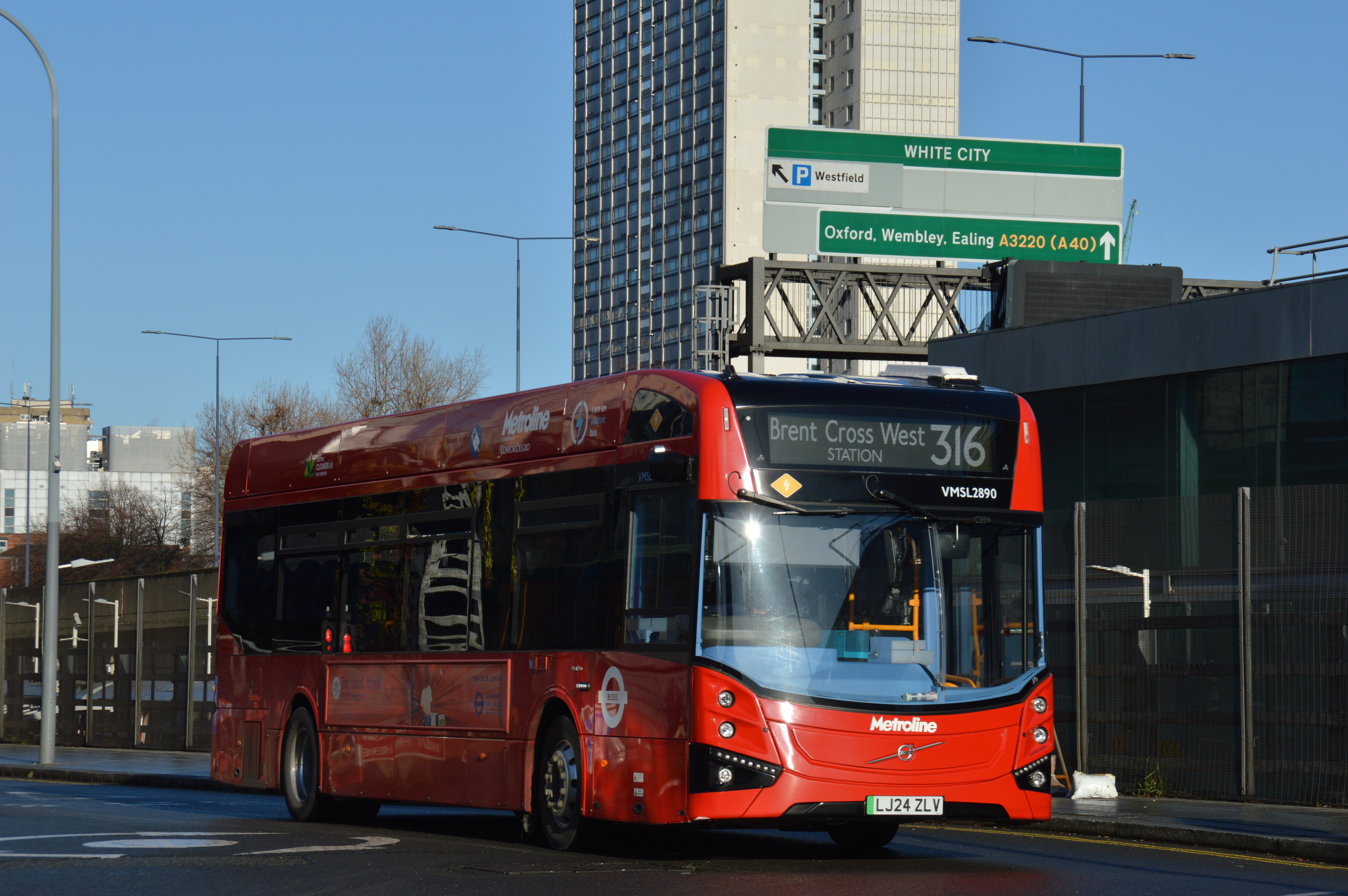
A MCV C103 EV bodied Volvo BZL at Shepherd's Bush station on route 316 in September 2025

As of March 2025, the Metroline fleet consisted of 1,496 buses, making the company London's third largest bus operator by number of fleet vehicles.
