= London Buses route 52 =

London bus route

52
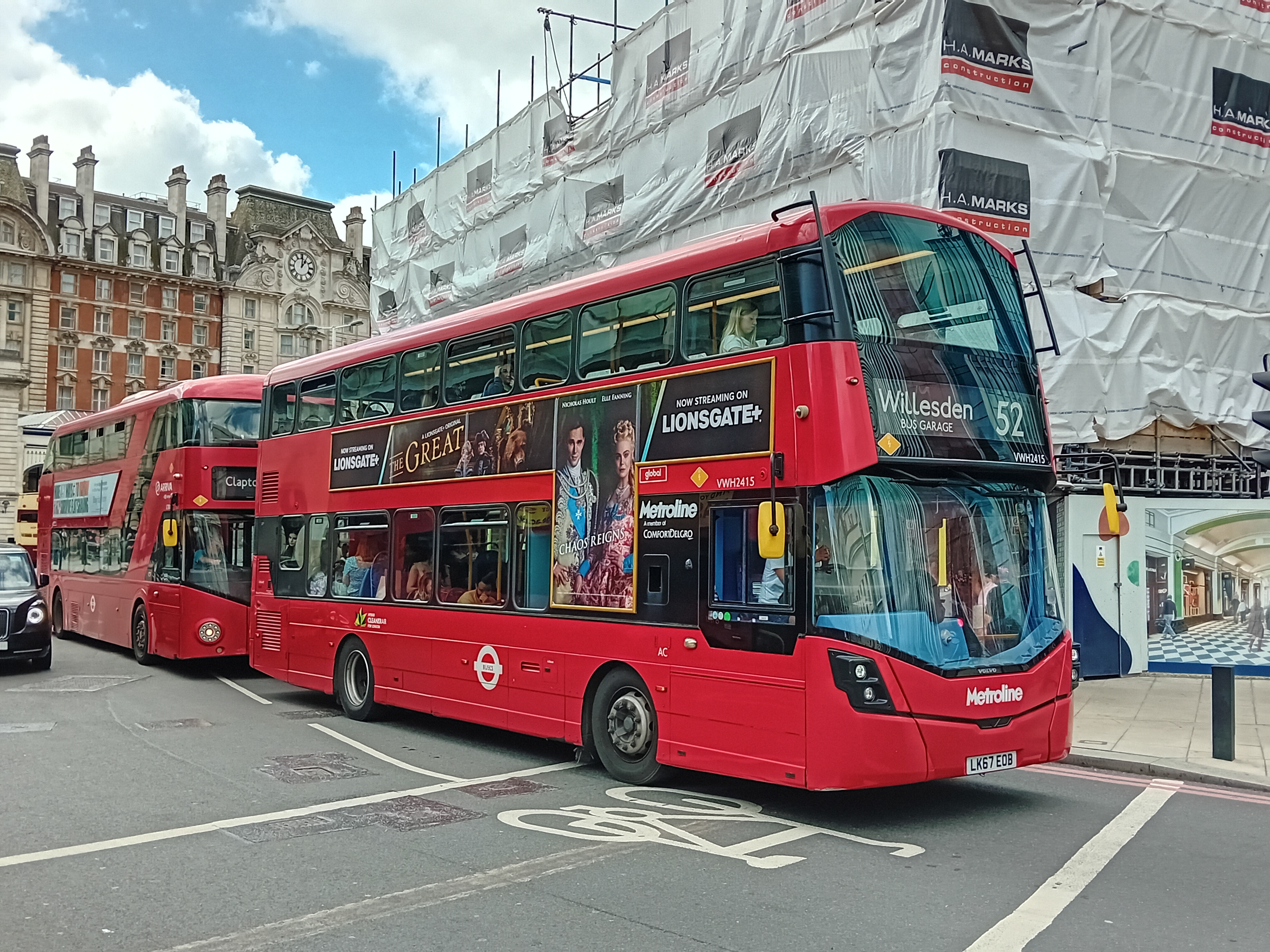
- Metroline Wright Gemini 3 bodied Volvo B5LH at Victoria station in August 2023

Overview
- Operator: Metroline
- Garage: Willesden
- Vehicle: Volvo B5LH Wright Gemini 3
- Peak vehicle requirement: Day: 16; Night: 3
- Night-time: 24-hour service

Route
- Start: Victoria bus station
- Via: Hyde Park Corner; Knightsbridge; Kensington Palace; Notting Hill; Ladbroke Grove; Kensal Rise
- End: Willesden bus garage
- Length: 7 miles (11 km)

Service
- Level: 24-hour service
- Frequency: About every 7-9 minutes
- Journey time: 35-50 minutes
- Operates: 24-hour service

London Buses route 52 is a Transport for London contracted bus route in London, England. Running between Victoria bus station and Willesden bus garage, it is operated by Metroline.

== History ==
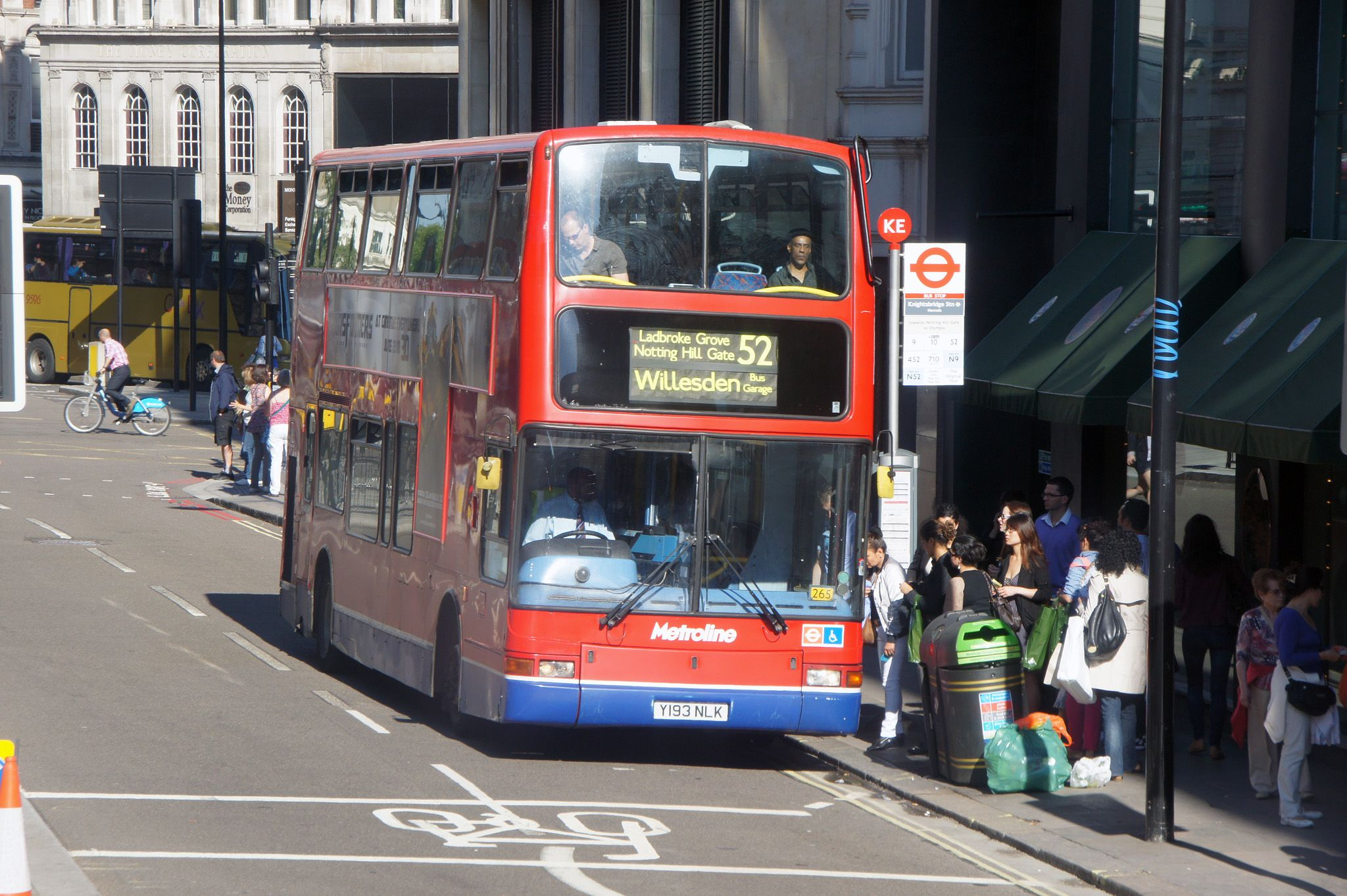
Metroline Plaxton President bodied Volvo B7TL at Knightsbridge station in June 2011

Route 52 began on 28 March 1923, running from Raynes Park to Ladbroke Grove. The service was changed many times, on 13 Feb 1924 it ran from Wormwood Scrubs to Tooting and later on, on 9 April 1924 the route was revised to run Ladbroke Grove to Victoria. It was extended to Mill Hill in 1932. Later, some services were extended on to Borehamwood on Monday to Saturday peak journeys where it was changed several times: in 1951, it was withdrawn from Warwick Road and Drayton Road to Elstree Way Hotel, but extended back on 3 February 1953, and further extended to Brook Road on 3 February 1954.

Another extension took the route to Rossington Avenue on Sundays from 1956. Seven years later, this was extended to include Monday to Friday peak workings.

In February 1966, residents of North Kensington protested when the route was cut. Over 600 signed a petition demanding that the route link Notting Hill with North Kensington. The protest was supported by Leon Brittan, then the prospective Conservative candidate for the Kensington North constituency in the 1966 general election.

In 1967 the Mill Hill terminus was changed from Mill Hill Green Man to the rebuilt Mill Hill Broadway Station. The route was then withdrawn beyond Mill Hill Broadway in 1969, the Borehamwood-Mill Hill section being replaced by route 292. Frequency cuts led to over 2,000 passengers signing a petition for the improvement of route 52 in the same year.

In December 1993 the contract to run the route was won by London Coaches, who in July 1994 transferred the route to its Atlas Bus & Coach subsidiary as it had a garage in Willesden, close to the route's terminus. Atlas operated the route with second-hand Leyland Titans in a route-specific livery. In November 1994, route 52 was included in the sale of Atlas Bus & Coach to Metroline, and in December 1996, the route took delivery of 22 Alexander RH bodied Volvo Olympians, the first new double-decker buses since the company's privatisation and the first new double-decker buses for the 52 since the introduction of MCW Metrobuses in 1985.

On 8 December 2012, route 52 was retained by Metroline.

On 17 November 2016, 14 people were injured as a bus on route 52 mounted a pavement and crashed into Kensal House on Ladbroke Grove.

== Current route ==
Route 52 operates via these primary locations:

- Victoria bus station
- Hyde Park Corner station
- Knightsbridge station
- Royal Albert Hall
- Palace Gate
- Kensington Palace
- Kensington Church Street for High Street Kensington station
- Notting Hill Gate station
- Ladbroke Grove station
- Ladbroke Grove Sainsbury's
- Kensal Rise station
- Willesden bus garage
