= London Buses route SL5 =

London Superloop express bus route

SL5
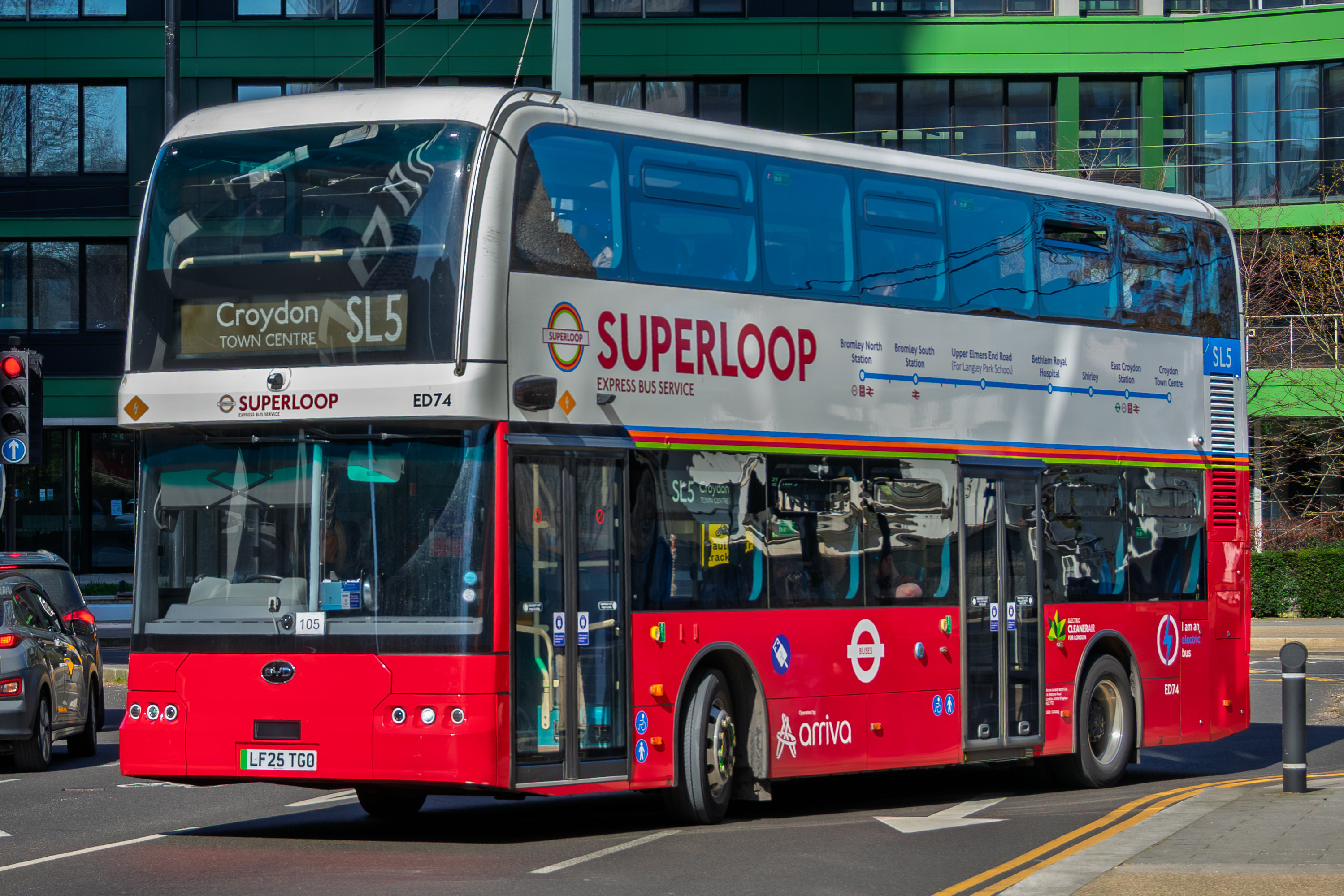
- Arriva London BYD BD11B at East Croydon station in March 2026

Overview
- Operator: Arriva London
- Garage: Croydon
- Vehicle: BYD BD11B
- Peak vehicle requirement: 10
- Began service: 3 February 2024
- Night-time: No night service

Route
- Start: Bromley North station
- Via: The Chinese Garage; Bethlem Royal Hospital; Shirley
- End: Croydon town centre
- Length: 7 miles (11 km)

Service
- Level: Daily
- Frequency: Every 12-15 minutes
- Journey time: 19-52 minutes
- Operates: 05:00 until 00:56

London Buses route SL5 is a Transport for London contracted Superloop express bus route in London, England. Running between Bromley North station and Croydon town centre, it is operated by Arriva London.

== History ==
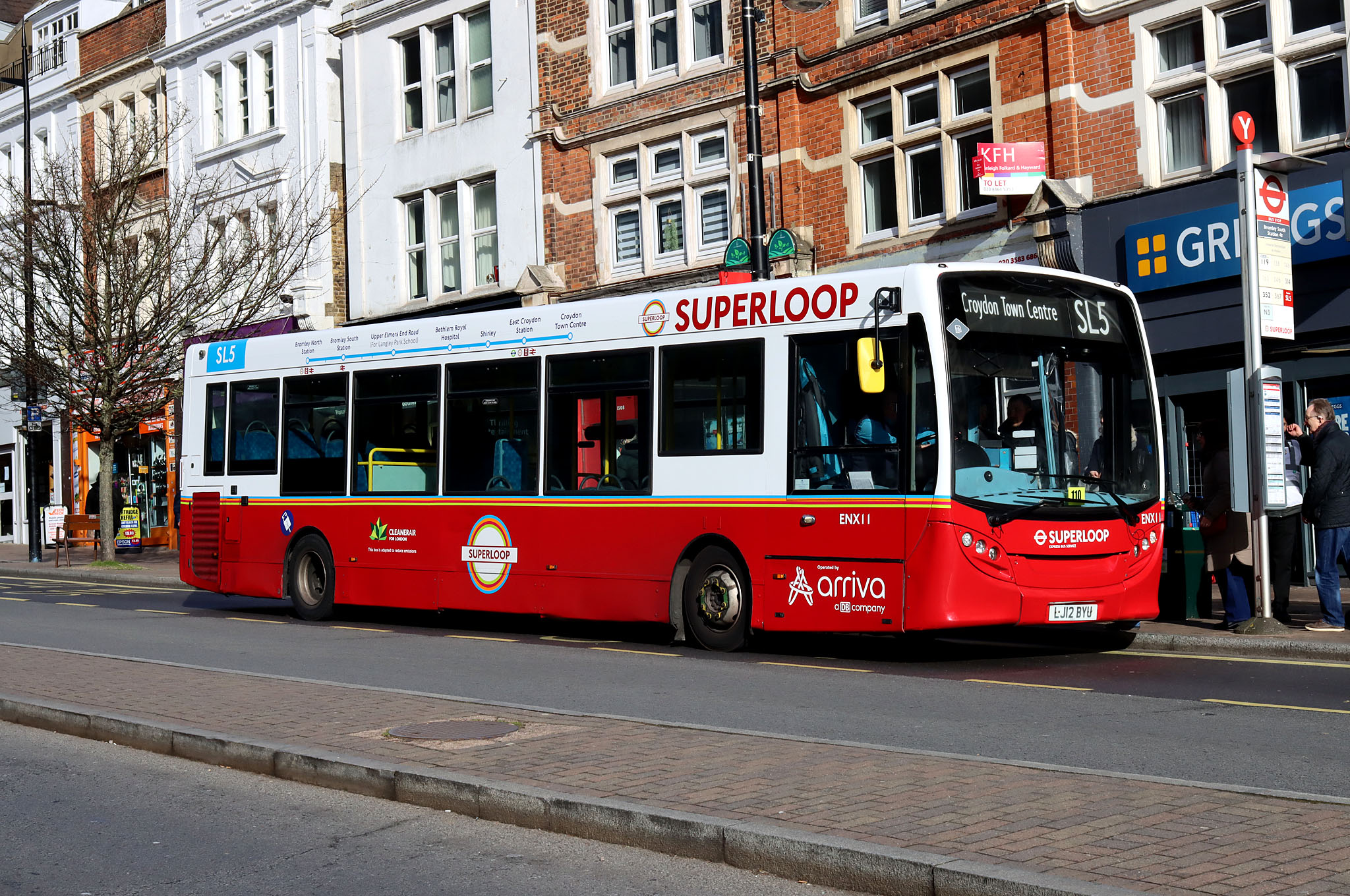
The route initially used single-decker Alexander Dennis Enviro200s when it launched

On 21 July 2023, a consultation for route SL5 was opened by Transport for London, and closed on 4 September the same year. On 5 December 2023, it was confirmed that the route would be introduced.

Route SL5 was introduced on 3 February 2024. It is operated by Arriva London from their Croydon garage. Unlike other Superloop routes, which are operated by double-decker buses, the SL5 started operation with single-decker Alexander Dennis Enviro200s due to overhanging trees on South Eden Park Road.

As part of Transport for London's pledge to make its entire bus fleet zero-emission by 2030, double-decker BYD BD11Bs replaced the single-decker Alexander Dennis Enviro200s on the route.

== Current route ==
Route SL5 operates via these primary locations:

- Bromley North station
- Bromley South station
- The Chinese Garage
- Bethlem Royal Hospital
- Shirley
- East Croydon station
- Croydon town centre

== Operation ==
The route operates at a frequency of a bus every 12 minutes on weekdays and Saturdays and a bus every 15 minutes on Sundays.

== Reception ==
Route SL5 has been met with generally positive feedback. In a poll, 81% of respondents believed that the route would make their journeys faster, and 58% said they would be more likely to use the route to replace a journey made by car.

Conservative Councillor Thomas Turrell, who represents Hayes and Coney Hall in Bromley, has voiced his disappointment with the route, saying that it does not help to improve connectivity in the rural areas of London, and that "residents will see it as a missed opportunity to really improve public transport connectivity".
