= London Buses route SL7 =

London Superloop express bus route

SL7
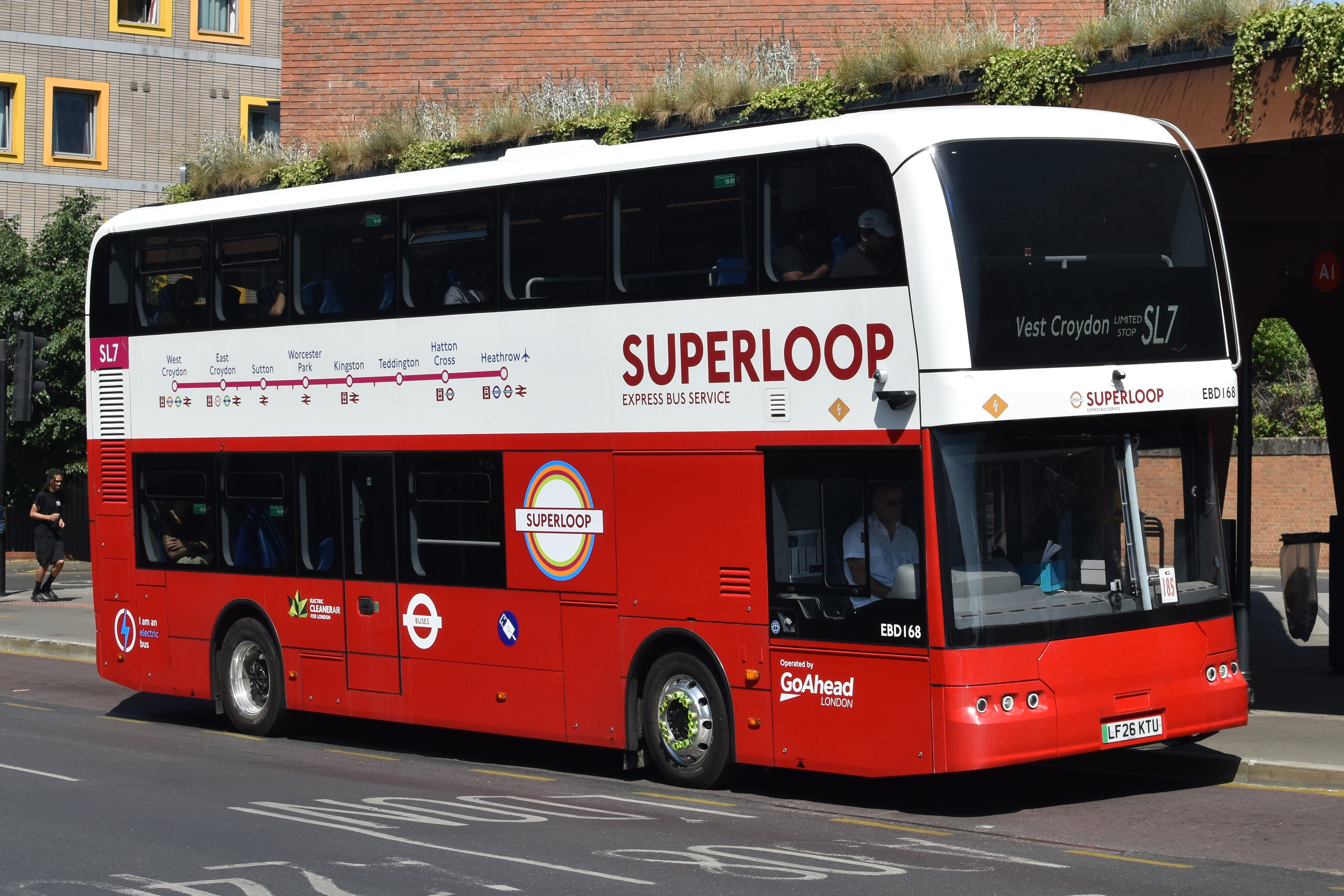
- Metrobus BYD BD11B at Cromwell Road bus station in May 2026

Overview
- Operator: Metrobus (Go-Ahead London)
- Garage: Croydon
- Vehicle: BYD BD11B
- Peak vehicle requirement: 20 (August 2023)
- Predecessors: Route 726
- Former operators: Quality Line; Metrobus; Tellings-Golden Miller; Capital Logistics; London Coaches

Route
- Start: West Croydon bus station
- Via: Wallington; Carshalton; Sutton; Cheam; North Cheam; Worcester Park; New Malden; Kingston upon Thames; Teddington; Hatton
- End: Heathrow Central bus station
- Length: 23.75 miles (38.22 km)

Service
- Level: Daily
- Frequency: 8-20 minutes
- Journey time: 76-129 minutes

London Buses route SL7, formerly London Buses route X26, is a Transport for London contracted Superloop express bus route in London, England. Running between West Croydon and Heathrow Central bus stations, it is operated by Go-Ahead London subsidiary Metrobus.

== History ==
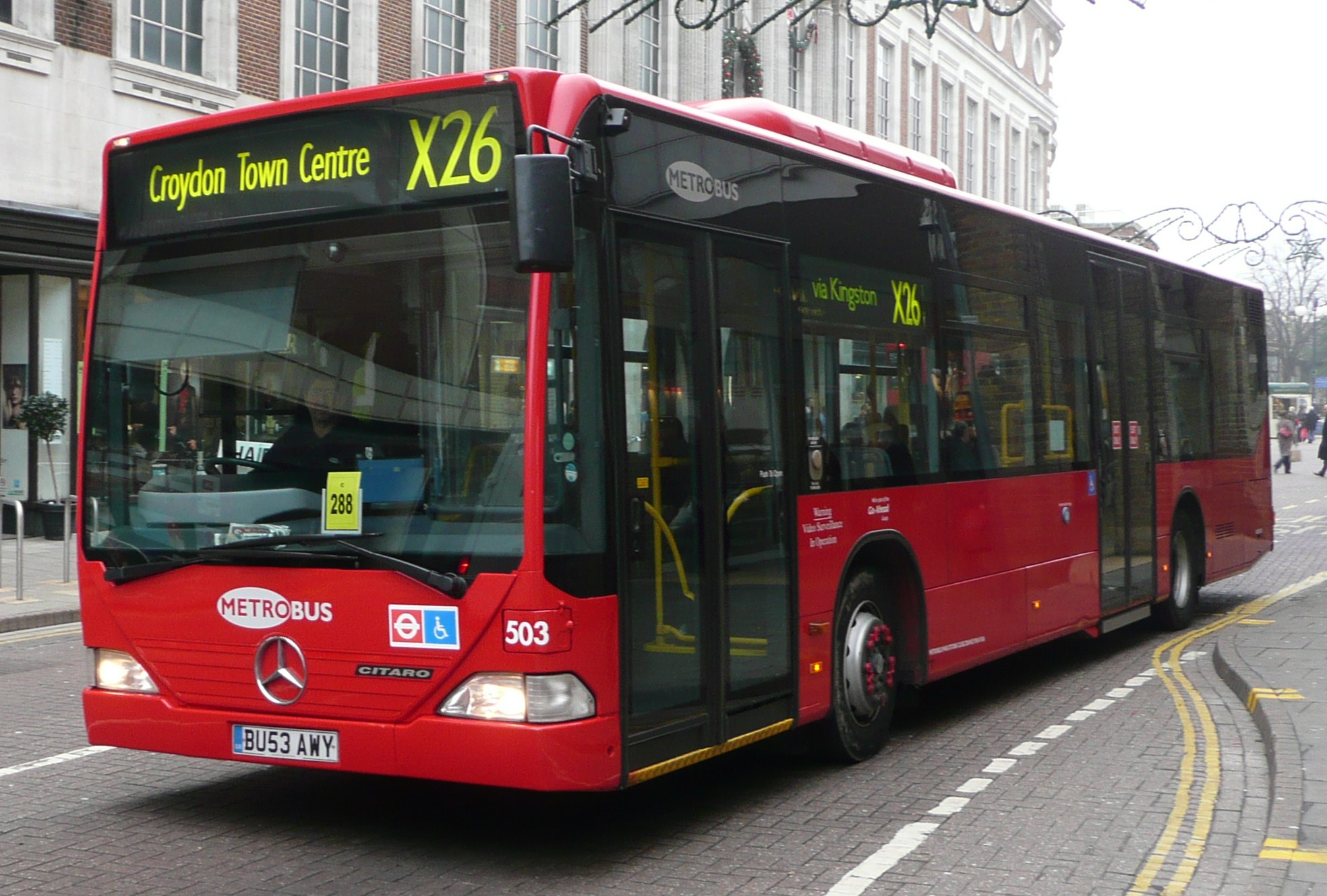
Metrobus Mercedes-Benz O530 Citaro on route X26 in Kingston upon Thames in December 2008

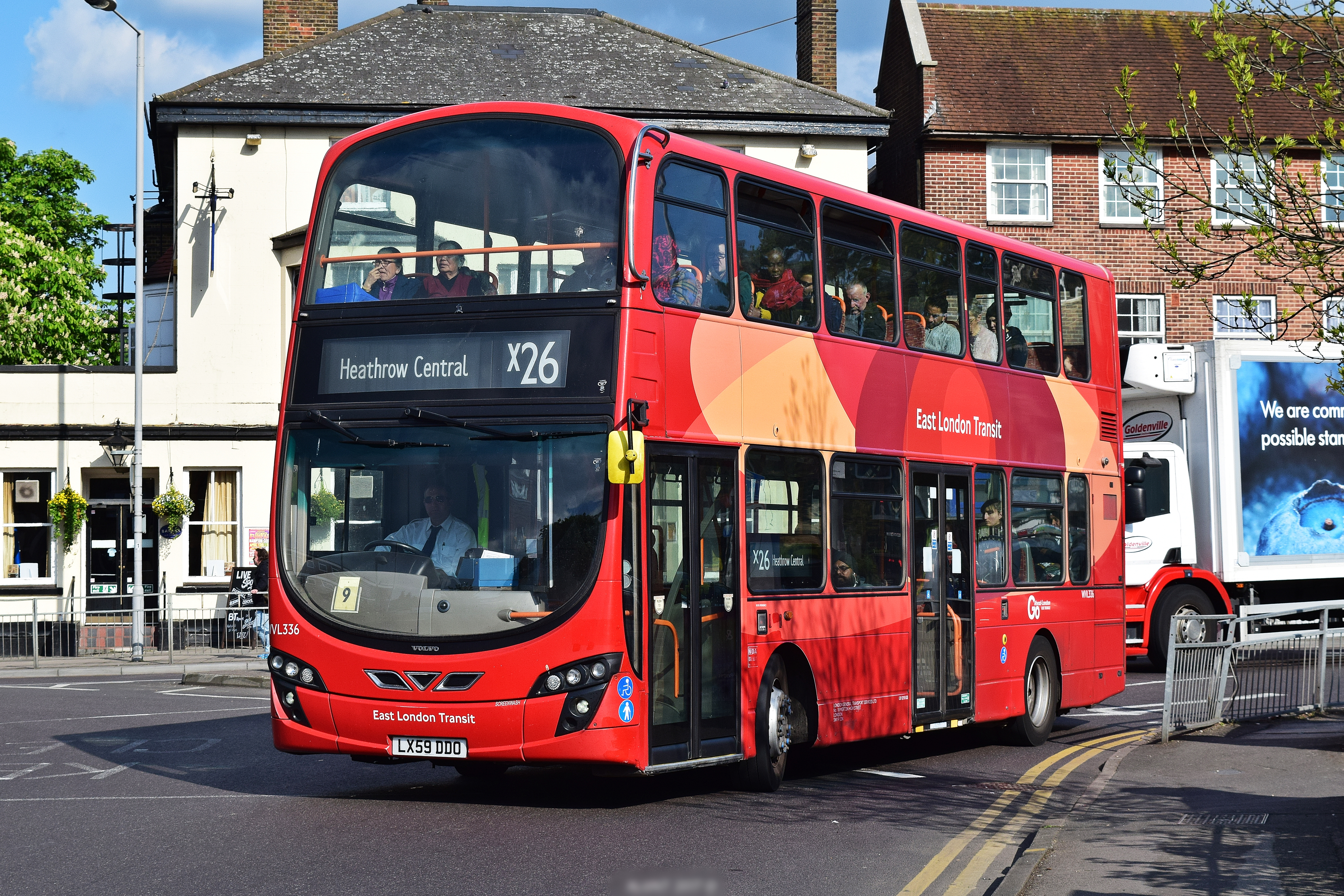
Metrobus Wright Eclipse Gemini 2 bodied Volvo B9TL in the livery of East London Transit in New Malden in April 2017

Route X26 has its origins in Green Line Coaches route 725, which started in the 1950s and ran from Gravesend and Dartford through Sidcup, Bromley, Croydon, Sutton and Kingston to Staines and Windsor. In the late 1970s, route 726 was introduced as a variant, from Gravesend to Windsor via Heathrow Airport and Slough instead of Staines.

By the 1980s, the sections of route between Heathrow and Windsor and between Gravesend and Dartford had been withdrawn. At that time, the Green Line network was operated by London Country Bus Services, but when that company was broken up in 1986, route 726, which ran almost entirely within Greater London, came under the control of London Country North West (LCNW) and Kentish Bus & Coach. In 1991, LCNW planned to withdraw the route, but London Regional Transport stepped in and took the route over. LCNW continued to operate the route on a short term one-year contract. On 29 February 1992, London Coaches, a subsidiary of London Buses privatised in 1992, commenced operating the route using dual-purpose DAF SB220 vehicles.

The contract changed from London Coaches to Capital Logistics in the late 1990s, and passenger numbers continued to decline. In 1997, London Transport attempted to withdraw the service, but at the end of year, it was given an 18-month reprieve after over 1,600 letters had been received in its support.

Early in 1999, the service was cut back to run between Bromley and Heathrow only; the service became hourly, with no early morning or late evening service. Capital Logistics was bought by Tellings-Golden Miller on 1 June 1999, shortly after a new contract for the 726 had been awarded. New low-floor buses were specified, and seven Alexander ALX300 bodied Volvo B10BLEs were purchased.

In April 2005, route 726 was renumbered X26 and the section between Bromley and East Croydon was withdrawn, rerouted to run via Teddington instead of Hampton Court, and many stops were removed to reduce run times and improve reliability. The contract was awarded to Metrobus, which used Scania OmniCity vehicles. London Buses hoped that the re-modelled route would attract more passengers and therefore specified large single-deck buses. It was initially intended to remove stops at Carshalton, Cheam, North Cheam and Worcester Park, but these were retained. The peak vehicle requirement (PVR) fell from six buses to four.

On 22 November 2008, route X26 was doubled in frequency to every 30 minutes for most of the day, including Sundays, although the evening service remained hourly. To cover for the increase in PVR while new vehicles were prepared, Metrobus hired Mercedes-Benz O530 Citaros from Wealden PSV, delivered directly from original owner Quality Line. The Citaros were returned to Wealden PSV and replaced with Scania OmniCitys from the Crawley Fastway network, refurbished and painted red; these were two years older than the OmniCitys that previously worked on the route.

In June 2010, a proposal to reintroduce the former 726 stop at Beddington was rejected by Transport for London, despite support from many residents. Upon being re-tendered, on 14 April 2012, the route passed to Quality Line with new Mercedes-Benz O530s.

When next tendered, it passed to Metrobus on 15 April 2017. Double-deck Wright Eclipse Gemini 2 bodied Volvo B9TLs that formerly operated East London Transit services were introduced after having their rear doors removed and additional luggage racks fitted.

On 19 August 2023, route X26 was renumbered SL7, becoming part of the Superloop express bus network. The frequency was also increased to every 8–20 minutes. Extra Wright Eclipse Gemini 2 bodied Volvo B9TLs displaced from route 101 were transferred to Croydon garage to bolster the fleet. These were fitted with luggage racks, but unlike the existing buses, retained their rear doors. The route also gained zero-emission BYD BD11s as part of Transport for London's pledge to make its entire bus fleet zero-emission by 2030.

With a length of 23.75 miles, it is the longest bus route in London.

== Current route ==
Route SL7 operates via these primary locations:

- West Croydon bus station
- East Croydon station
- Wallington
- Carshalton
- Sutton station
- Cheam
- North Cheam
- Worcester Park station
- New Malden
- Kingston station
- Teddington
- Hatton Cross station
- Heathrow Central bus station
