= KMB Route 213M =

Kowloon Motor Bus routes (Hong Kong)

213M
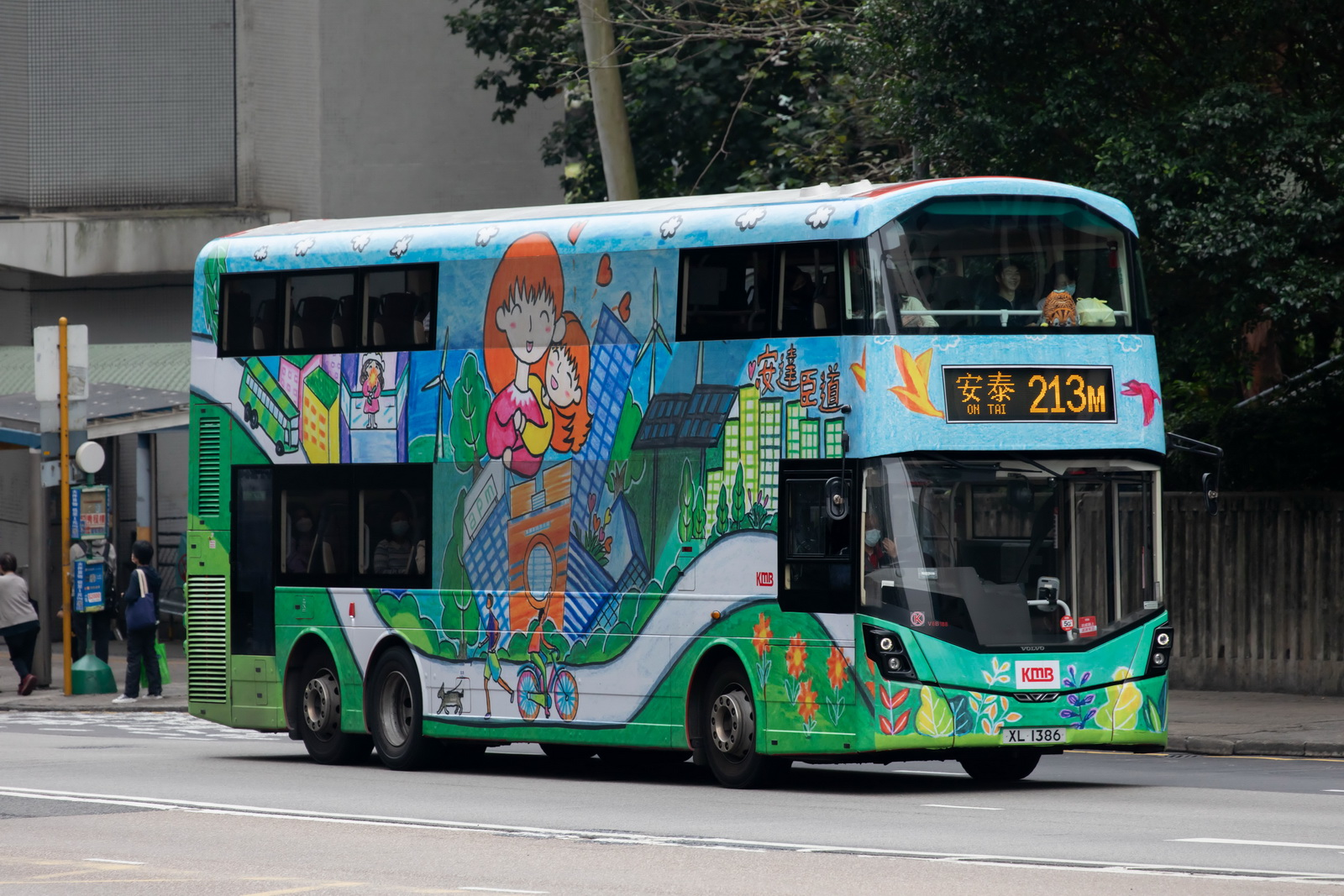

Overview
- Operator: Kowloon Motor Bus
- Vehicle: Enviro500 MMC (ATENU, 3ATENU, E6X); BYD B12A 12m (BEB)
- Began service: June 4, 2016; 10 years ago

Route
- Start: On Tai
- Via: On Tat Estate, Po Tat Estate, Sau Mau Ping
- End: Lam Tin Station (circular)
- Length: 9.0

Service
- Frequency: 4–20
- Journey time: 38
- Operates: 05:00–02:00

213S

Overview
- Operator: Kowloon Motor Bus
- Began service: June 29, 2017; 9 years ago

Route
- Start: On Tat
- Via: Po Tat Estate, Sau Mau Ping
- End: Lam Tin Station (circular)
- Length: 7.7

Service
- Frequency: 6–10
- Journey time: 34
- Operates: Monday–Friday: 06:00–09:00

213B

Overview
- Operator: Kowloon Motor Bus
- Began service: March 25, 2019; 7 years ago

Route
- Start: On Tai
- Via: On Tat Estate
- End: Kwun Tong, Ting Fu Street
- Length: 9.0

Service
- Frequency: 25
- Journey time: 30
- Operates: Monday–Friday: 06:45–08:00

Kowloon Motor Bus Route 213M is a Kowloon urban bus route in Hong Kong, operated by Kowloon Motor Bus (KMB). It began service on June 4, 2016, running between On Tai and Lam Tin Station. The route passes through On Tat Estate, Po Tat Estate, and Sau Fai House at Sau Mau Ping, traveling via Tseung Kwan O Road to and from Lam Tin, with a full fare of HK$5.1. Route 213M includes special services 213S and 213B, both operating only during weekday morning peak hours: 213S follows a circular route between On Tat and Lam Tin Station, mirroring the original 213M route before its extension to On Tai; 213B runs one-way from On Tai to Kwun Tong Ting Fu Street, with no intermediate stops between On Tat Estate and Hip Wo Street near Tung Yan Street.

As the first franchised bus route serving the Development at Anderson Road, 213M primarily facilitates residents’ access to Lam Tin for MTR connections, operating for 21 hours daily, making it KMB’s longest-serving franchised bus route, surpassed only by Citybus Route 5B in Hong Kong.

== History ==
On January 8, 2015, the Transport Department presented proposals to the Kwun Tong District Council’s Traffic and Transport Committee for public transport services in the Development at Anderson Road. These included six new routes, four of which were to be awarded through open tender, including a bus route circularly connecting the development area to Lam Tin MTR Station to facilitate MTR access. The proposal noted that the route would initially use On Tat Estate as a temporary terminus, moving to On Tai Estate once it was occupied.

In November 2015, the Transport Department awarded operating rights for all four new routes to KMB, designating the route to Lam Tin MTR Station as 213M. With On Tat Estate gradually occupied from 2016, the route commenced service on June 4, 2016, initially operating circularly between On Tat and Lam Tin MTR Station, offering a HK$0.6 MTR transfer discount. On August 6, 2016, an additional stop was added for the On Tat-bound direction outside the Kwun Tong Police Station on Tseung Kwan O Road.

As On Tai Estate began occupancy in mid-2017, concerns were raised by On Tat Estate residents and the On Tat Residents Association’s secretary-general, Hsu Yau-wai, about potential boarding difficulties if 213M’s terminus was extended to On Tai. The Transport Department responded that adjustments would consider On Tat’s needs, potentially including special services during peak hours to ensure both estates’ residents could access bus services. On June 29, 2017, 213M extended its terminus to On Tai, adding a stop near Oi Tat House at On Tat Estate on On Sau Road for both directions, bypassing On Tat Terminus for On Tai-bound trips. Simultaneously, the special service 213S was introduced, following the pre-extension 213M route during weekday morning peak hours. The HK$0.6 MTR transfer discount was extended to 213S, but both routes’ discounts ended on October 1, 2018.

Citing congestion in Kwun Tong Town Centre, the Transport Department initially resisted introducing direct public transport to the area. However, on March 1, 2019, the Transport Department proposed to the Kwun Tong District Council adding a special service 213B for 213M, offering five morning weekday trips from On Tai via On Tat and Hip Wo Street to Tung Yan Street in Kwun Tong, returning via Tseung Kwan O Road. Route 213B began service on March 25, 2019. From April 14, 2020, 213B was temporarily reduced to four trips, a change made permanent from August 9, 2021. From August 14, 2023, all 213B trips were rerouted after Hip Wo Street to travel west on Kwun Tong Road, adding a stop at Millennium City before terminating at Ting Fu Street, without returning to On Tai. From December 15, 2024, 213M added a stop at Kam Tai House on On Sau Road for On Tai-bound trips.

== Service hours and frequency ==
All 213M trips depart from On Tai, operating from early morning to late night. The following service hours and frequency information are based on the latest update.

From On Tai
Day	Service hours	Frequency (minutes)
Monday–Friday	05:00–06:30	15
Monday–Friday	06:30–06:48	9
Monday–Friday	06:48–07:20	8
Monday–Friday	07:20–07:50	10
Monday–Friday	07:50–08:15	12–13
Monday–Friday	08:15–09:00	15
Monday–Friday	09:00–16:00	10
Monday–Friday	16:00–16:27	9
Monday–Friday	16:27–17:05	7–8
Monday–Friday	17:05–19:30	4–5
Monday–Friday	19:30–23:00	10
Monday–Friday	23:00–00:00	12
Monday–Friday	00:00–02:00	15
Saturday	05:00–06:00	15
Saturday	06:00–07:00	12
Saturday	07:00–09:00	8
Saturday	09:00–17:00	10
Saturday	17:00–19:00	7–8
Saturday	19:00–00:00	10
Saturday	00:00–01:00	15
Saturday	01:00–02:00	20
Sunday and public holidays	05:00–07:00	20
Sunday and public holidays	07:00–17:00	10
Sunday and public holidays	17:00–19:00	8
Sunday and public holidays	19:00–23:00	10
Sunday and public holidays	23:00–01:00	15
Sunday and public holidays	01:00–02:00	20

All 213S trips depart from On Tat, operating only on Monday–Friday (excluding public holidays) during morning peak hours. The following service hours and frequency information are based on the latest update.

From On Tat
Day	Service hours	Frequency (minutes)
Monday–Friday	06:00–06:30	10
Monday–Friday	06:30–06:46	8
Monday–Friday	06:46–07:00	7
Monday–Friday	07:00–07:36	6
Monday–Friday	07:36–09:00	7

Route 213B operates only on Monday–Friday (excluding public holidays) with four trips from On Tai, as listed below:

From On Tai
Day	Service hours	Frequency (minutes)
Monday–Friday	06:45–08:00	25

== Fares ==
Routes 213M, 213S, and 213B have a full fare of HK$5.1, with no section fares.

All three routes offer half-fare discounts for children under 12 and seniors aged 65 or older. Hong Kong residents aged 60–64, seniors aged 65 or older, and eligible persons with disabilities using designated Octopus cards can enjoy a HK$2 fare under the Public Transport Fare Concession Scheme for the Elderly and Eligible Persons with Disabilities. Passengers must pay with cash or Octopus card, with no change provided; each adult passenger may bring up to two children under 4 who do not occupy seats for free. Additionally, passengers can use the diversified electronic payment system (e-Payment), (Note: The system supports contactless VISA, JCB, Mastercard, UnionPay, Apple Pay, Google Pay, Samsung Pay, AlipayHK EasyGo, UnionPay QuickPass, and BOC Pay QR codes.) but this payment method does not qualify for transfer discounts with non-KMB/Long Win Bus routes, the Public Transport Fare Subsidy Scheme, or the elderly and disabled fare concession.

== Vehicles ==
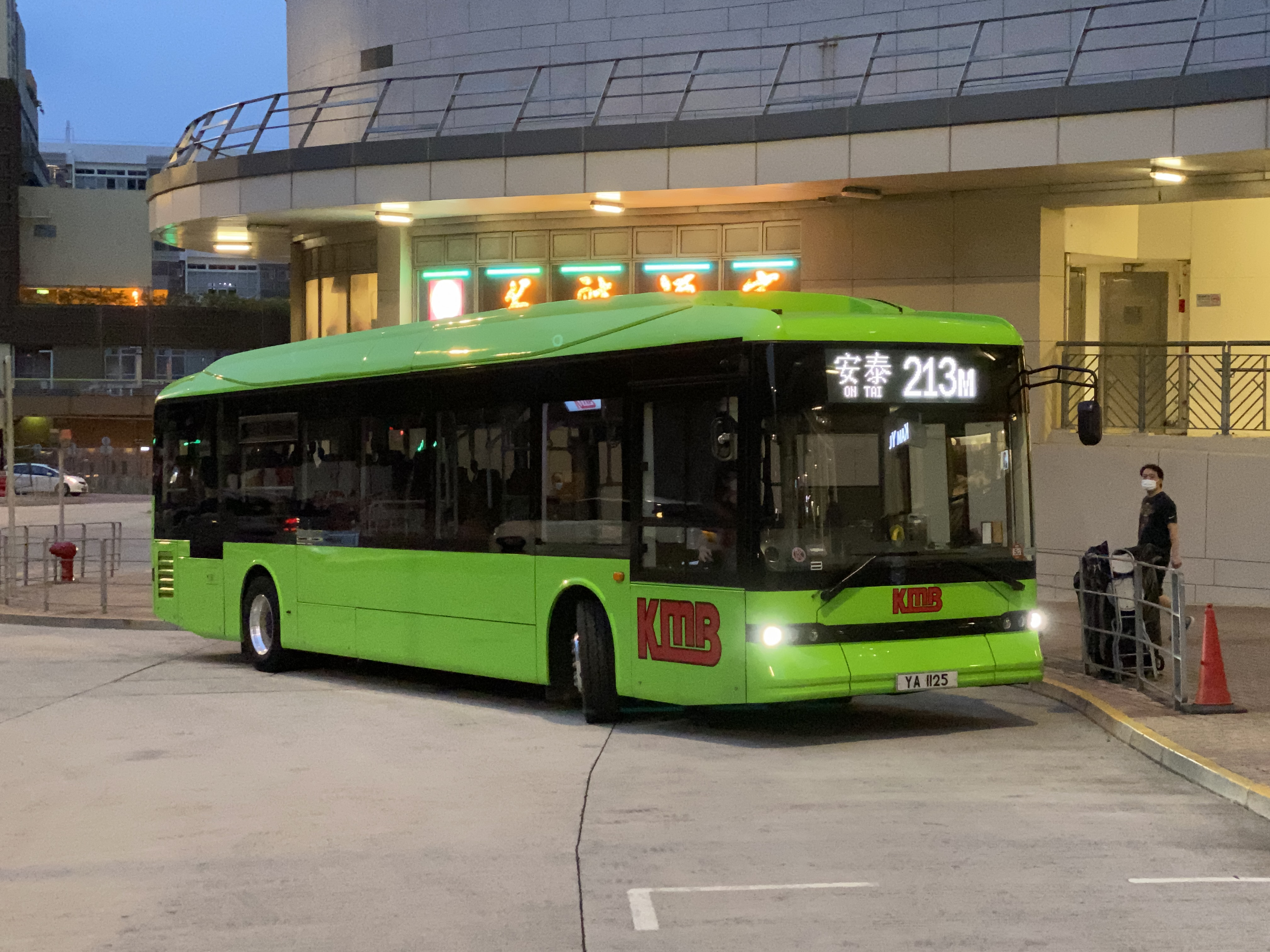
From September 24, 2022, KMB deployed BYD B12A electric buses on this route.

According to the 2022–2023 Kwun Tong District Bus Route Plan, Route 213M is served by 10 double-deck air-conditioned buses.

When 213M began service, KMB primarily deployed newly licensed Enviro500 MMC Facelift 12m double-deck buses (fleet code ATENU), equipped with electronic destination signs on the left side and rear. Some buses displayed banners advertising the route and its MTR transfer discount, with one bus (ATENU1000/UB8222) being KMB’s 1,000th licensed Enviro500 MMC 12m bus. To meet passenger demand, KMB occasionally reassigned buses from routes 13D, 13X, 95, 296D, and N691 to support 213M.

From September 2020, 12.8m buses were approved for the route, with KMB deploying Enviro500 MMC 12.8m buses, including those with Euro V engines (fleet code 3ATENU) and Euro VI engines (fleet code E6X).

From September 24, 2022, KMB introduced the BYD B series 12m electric buses (BEB) to the route. On the inaugural day, passengers received a set of three limited-edition electric bus pins and a numbered certificate. KMB invited Kowloon East Legislative Election member Ngan Man-yu, and Kwun Tong District Councillors Hsu Yau-wai and Lam Wai to officiate the inaugural ceremony, attracting many residents and bus enthusiasts.

From July 30, 2023, KMB deployed BYD B series 12m double-deck electric buses (BED) on the route.

== Routing ==
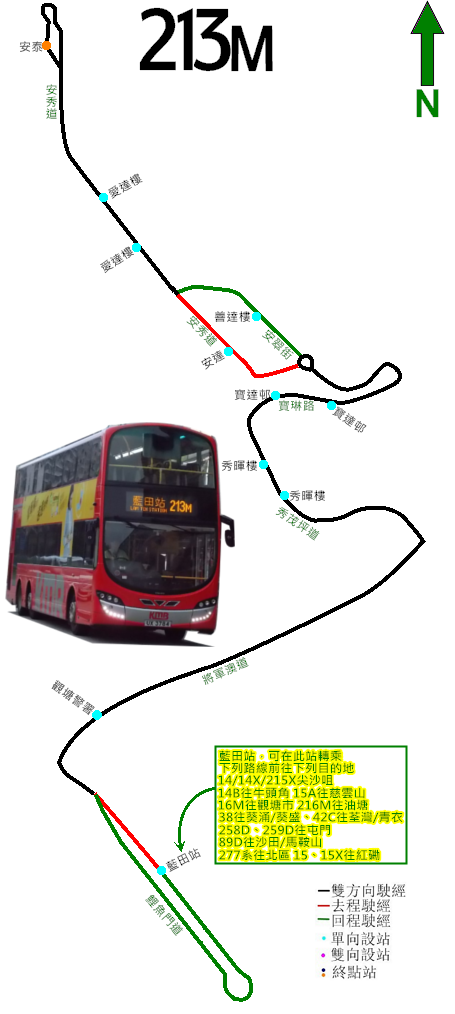
Route map for 213M

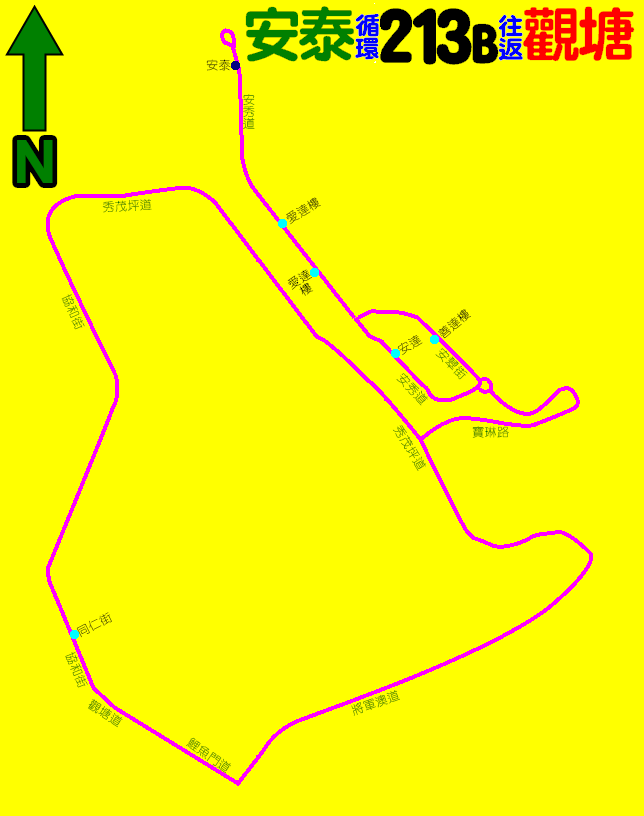
Route map for 213B

Route 213M trips departing from On Tai travel via On Sau Road, Po Lam Road, Sau Mau Ping Road, Tseung Kwan O Road, Lei Yue Mun Road, a roundabout, Lei Yue Mun Road, Tseung Kwan O Road, Sau Mau Ping Road, Po Lam Road, On Chui Street, and On Sau Road. Specific stops are listed in the infobox.

Route 213S trips departing from On Tat travel via On Sau Road, Po Lam Road, Sau Mau Ping Road, Tseung Kwan O Road, Lei Yue Mun Road, a roundabout, Lei Yue Mun Road, Tseung Kwan O Road, Sau Mau Ping Road, Po Lam Road, On Sau Road, On Chui Street, and On Sau Road. Specific stops are listed in the infobox.

Route 213B trips departing from On Tai travel via On Sau Road, Po Lam Road, Sau Mau Ping Road, Hip Wo Street, and Kwun Tong Road. Specific stops are listed in the infobox.

== Usage ==
Route 213M provides rail connection services for estates in the Development at Anderson Road, resulting in consistently high passenger volumes since On Tat Estate and On Tai Estate were occupied. Long queues are common during peak hours, prompting KMB to add non-scheduled trips to manage crowds. In 2019, special service 213B was introduced to address demand for travel to Kwun Tong Town Centre. In 2021, Route 213M recorded approximately 1,500 passengers daily from 6:00 to 9:00 AM. In 2023, Routes 213M and 213S had an average occupancy rate of about 75% during the busiest half-hour.

Despite requests from the Kwun Tong District Council to make 213B a full-day service, the Transport Department noted in the 2022–2023 Kwun Tong District Bus Route Plan that 213B’s passenger load was low, proposing a reduction to two trips. In 2023, the Transport Department reported to the Kwun Tong District Council that 213B’s per-trip occupancy was approximately 30% or lower.

== See also ==
- List of bus routes in Hong Kong
