= London Buses route SL1 =

London Superloop express bus route

SL1
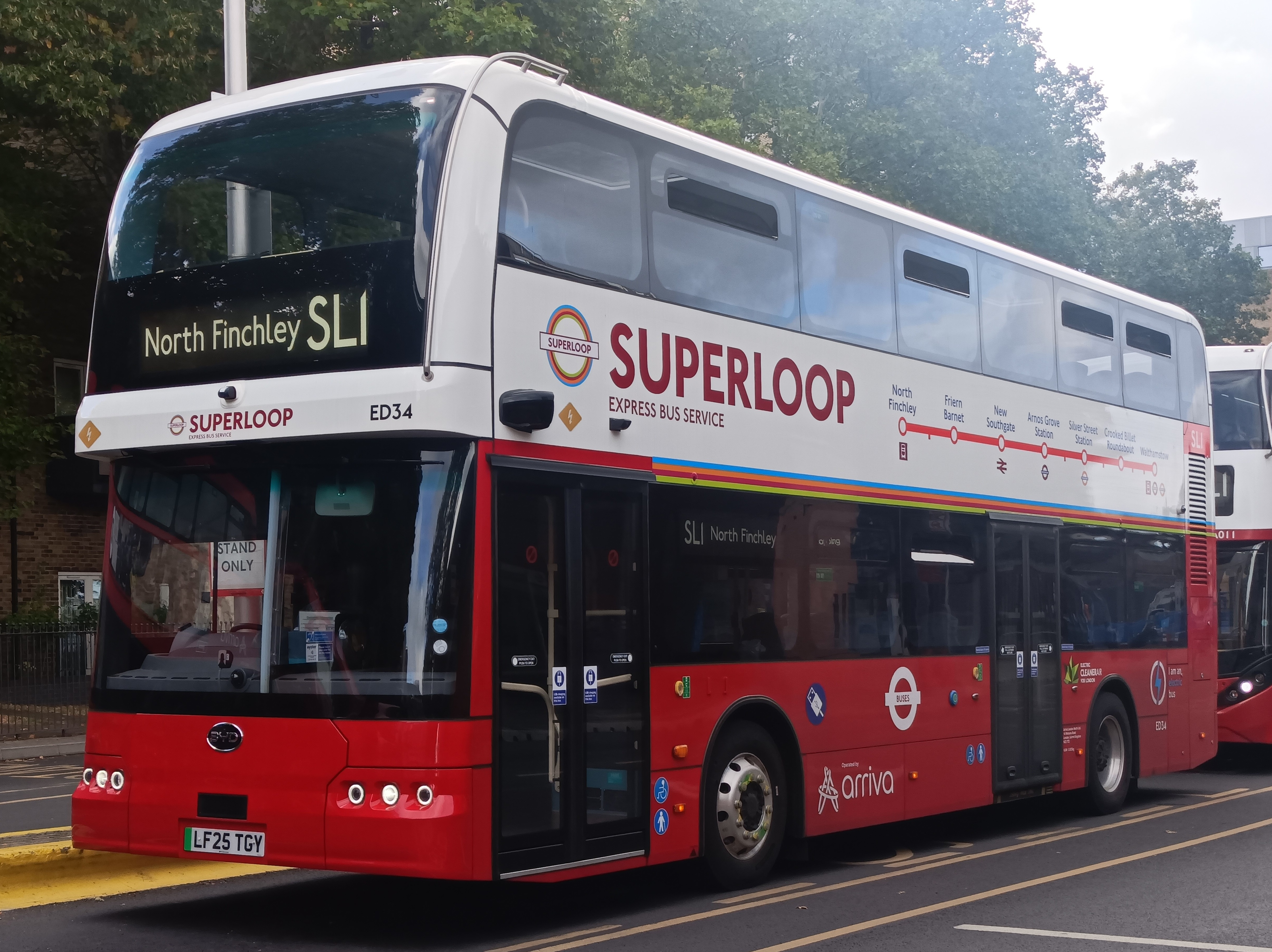
- Arriva London BYD BD11B at Walthamstow bus station in September 2025

Overview
- Operator: Arriva London
- Garage: Palmers Green
- Vehicle: BYD BD11B
- Began service: 9 December 2023

Route
- Start: North Finchley bus station
- Via: Friern Barnet; New Southgate; Arnos Grove; Palmers Green; Meridian Water; South Chingford
- End: Walthamstow Central station
- Length: 9 miles (14 km)

Service
- Level: Daily
- Frequency: Every 12-15 minutes
- Journey time: 30-56 minutes
- Operates: 05:00 until 01:19

London Buses route SL1 is a Transport for London contracted Superloop express bus route in London, England. Running between North Finchley bus station and Walthamstow Central station, it is operated by Arriva London.

== History ==
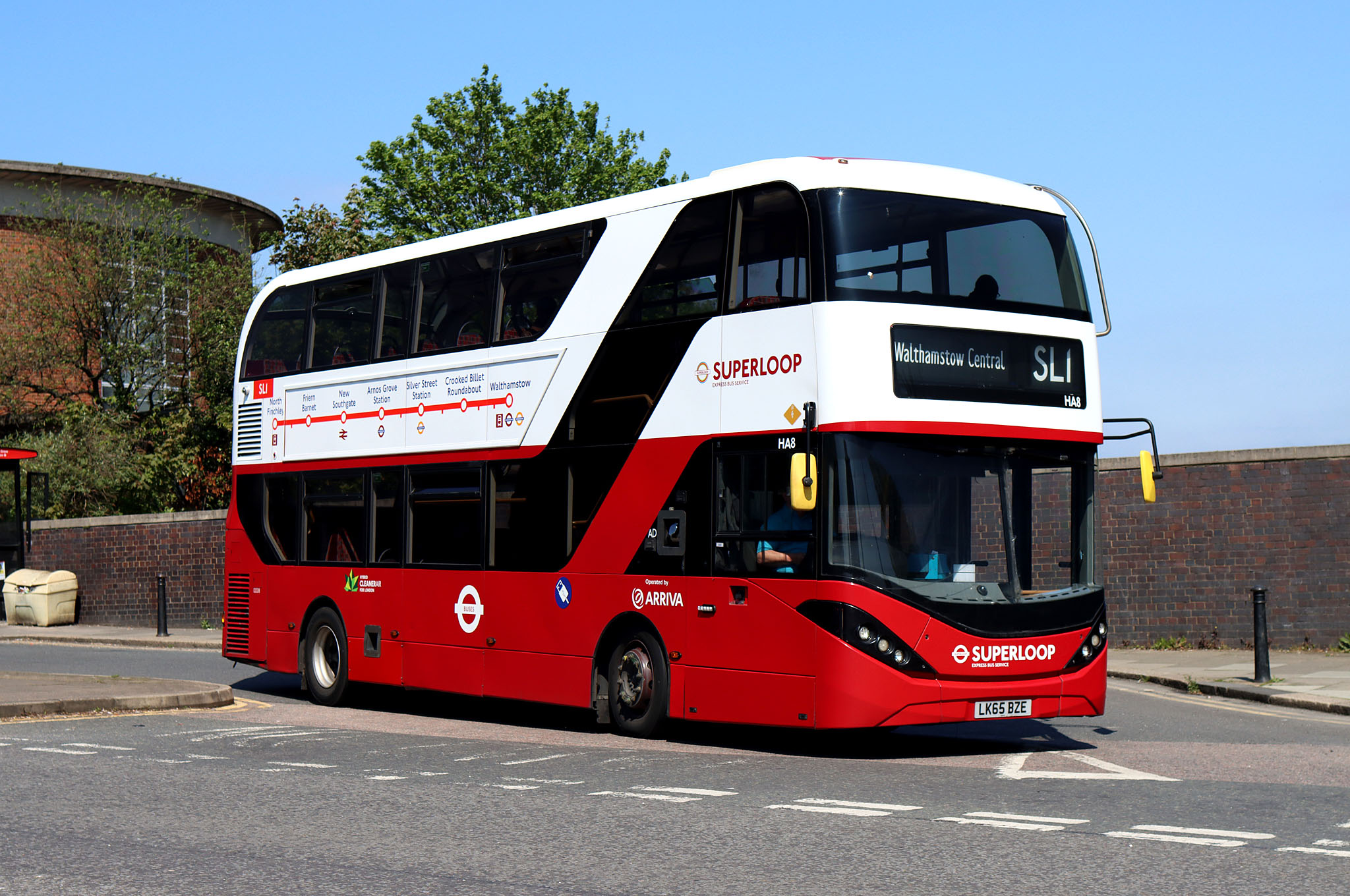
The route initially used Alexander Dennis Enviro400H Citys when it launched

The route was first proposed by Transport for London in June 2023 as the second proposed new route in the Superloop express bus network. At the time of the consultation, the route was proposed to be numbered X34. It was proposed to partially parallel routes 34 and 221. Having been renumbered SL1, it was introduced on 9 December 2023. It is operated by Arriva London as a variation to its route 34 contract that it parallels between New Southgate and Walthamstow.

After a competitive tendering process, the contract was retained by Arriva London from November 2024 with the Alexander Dennis Enviro400H Citys to be replaced by brand new BYD BD11Bs. According to internal TfL reliability metrics from July 2024, the route is performing well and better than the contractual minimum standards, with bus speeds in line with expected performance.

== Current route ==
Route SL1 operates via these primary locations:

- North Finchley bus station
- Friern Barnet
- New Southgate station
- Arnos Grove station
- Palmers Green
- Silver Street station
- Meridian Water
- South Chingford
- Walthamstow Market
- Walthamstow Central station for Walthamstow bus station

== Operation ==
The route operates at a frequency of a bus every 12 minutes on weekdays and Saturdays and a bus every 15 minutes on Sundays.

== Reception ==
Route SL1 has been criticised for not offering a direct link to North Middlesex University Hospital in Edmonton.

== Former route SL1 ==
From June 1996 until August 2002, a previous route SL1 ran in Central London connecting the mainline railway stations at Paddington, Marylebone, Euston, St Pancras, King's Cross, Liverpool Street, Fenchurch Street, London Bridge, Waterloo and Victoria. The route was operated by Thorpes and was branded as Stationlink, running an hourly (clockwise) circular service with route SL2 operating in the reverse direction. Both were replaced by routes 205 and 705 respectively in August 2002.
