= London Buses route SL6 =

London Superloop express bus route

SL6
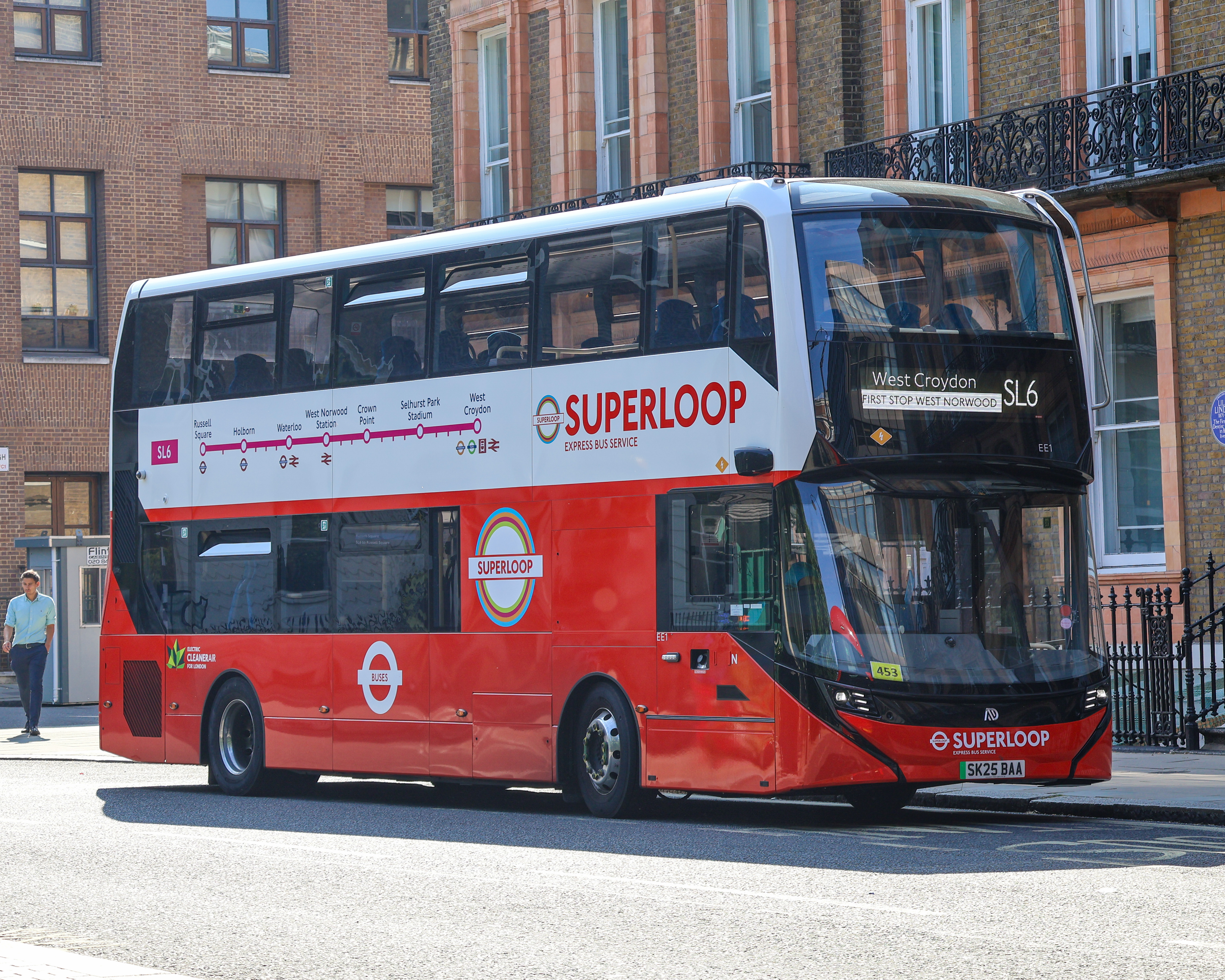
- Arriva London Alexander Dennis Enviro400EV at Russell Square in June 2025

Overview
- Operator: Arriva London
- Garage: Norwood
- Vehicle: Alexander Dennis Enviro400EV
- Began service: 27 October 1986
- Former operators: Arriva London; London Regional Transport; London Central
- Night-time: Night Bus N68

Route
- Start: Russell Square
- Via: Aldwych; Waterloo; West Norwood; Selhurst Park
- End: West Croydon bus station
- Length: 12 miles (19 km)

Service
- Level: Weekdays (peak hours only)
- Journey time: 55-79 minutes
- Operates: 05:50 until 09:54 (towards Russell Square); 15:40 until 20:04 (towards West Croydon bus station)

London Buses route SL6, formerly London Buses route X68, is a Transport for London contracted Superloop express bus route in London, England. Running between Russell Square and West Croydon bus station, it is operated by Arriva London.

The route runs on weekdays during peak hours only – towards Russell Square in the morning peak, and towards West Croydon bus station in the evening peak.

== History ==
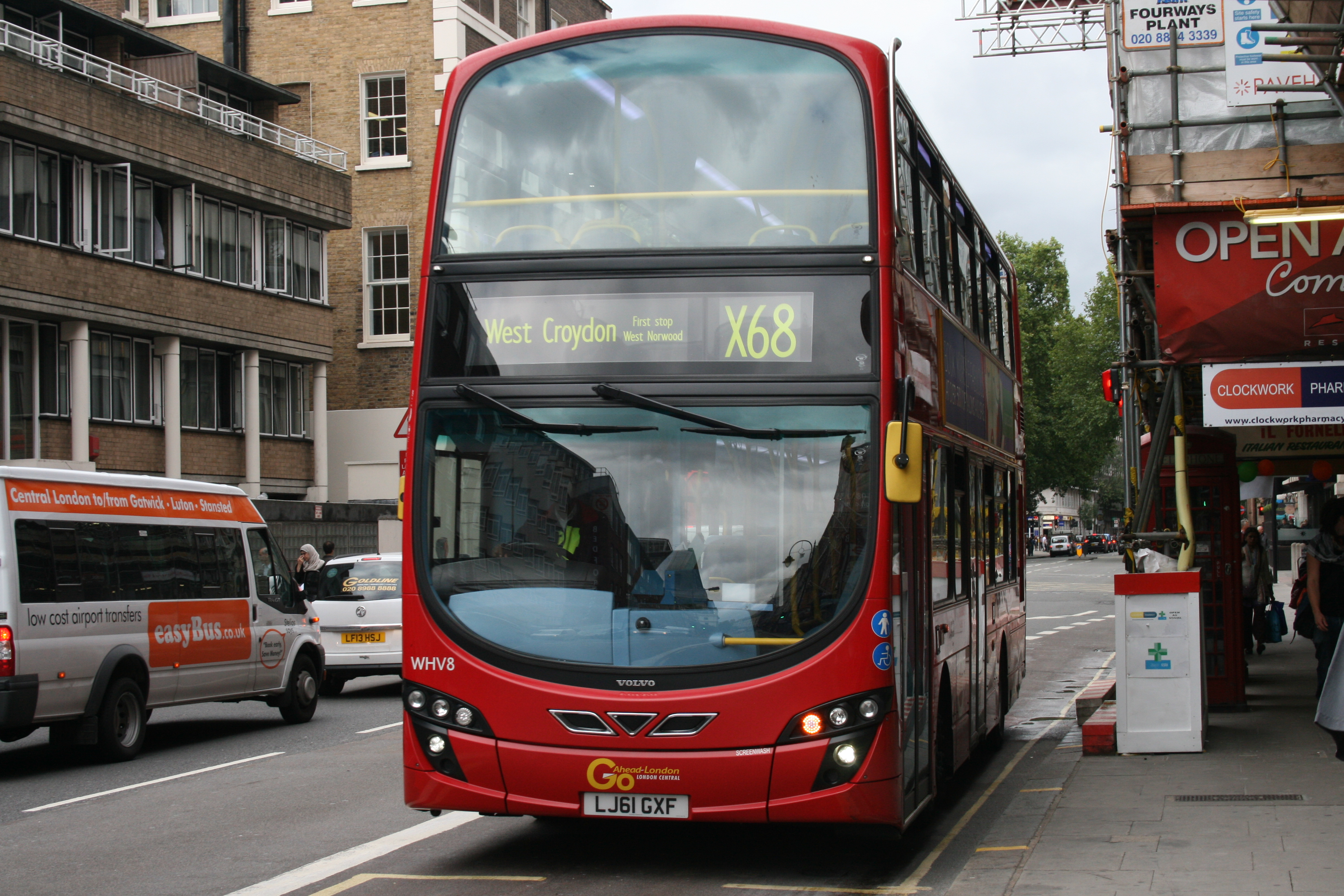
London Central Wright Eclipse Gemini 2 bodied Volvo B5LH on route X68 at Russell Square in August 2014

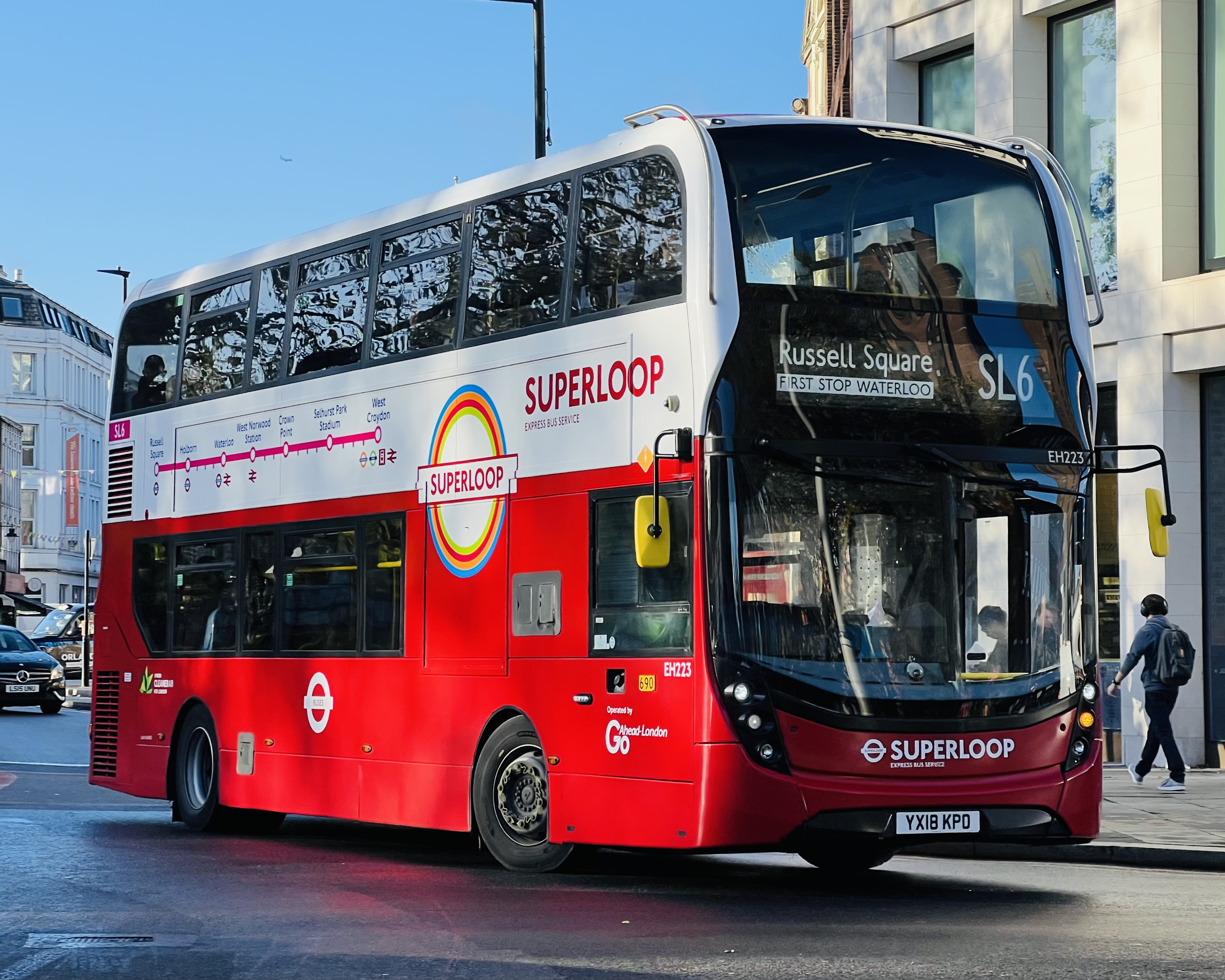
London Central Alexander Dennis Enviro400H MMC at Waterloo station in November 2023

Route X68 commenced on 27 October 1986 as a peak-hour, express version of route 68 operating between Russell Square and West Croydon bus station with no stops made between West Norwood and Waterloo. It was operated by London Regional Transport's Norwood bus garage with Leyland Olympians fitted with high back seats. As part of the privatisation of London bus services, in January 1995 it was taken over by Arriva London.

Upon being re-tendered it passed to London Central on 3 April 2006 being operated by Wright Eclipse Gemini bodied Volvo B7TLs. London Central successfully retained the route when re-tendered, commencing new contracts in 2011 and 2018, with Alexander Dennis Enviro400H MMCs introduced with the commencement of the latter contract. In 2018, a three-axle BCI bus was trialled on the route.

On 31 July 2023, route X68 was renumbered SL6, becoming part of the Superloop express bus network. Prior to being renumbered (and branded as part of the Superloop), the buses that operated route X68 could also operate route 188. During the day buses were stabled at Waterloo garage.

On 29 July 2024, Arriva London was awarded as the new operator of route SL6. Operations transferred on 29 March 2025. The route was the first in London to receive the second generation of Alexander Dennis Enviro400EVs.

== Current route ==
Route SL6 operates via these primary locations:

- Russell Square
- Holborn station
- Aldwych
- Waterloo Bridge
- South Bank
- Waterloo station
- West Norwood station
- Beulah Hill
- Selhurst Park
- West Croydon bus station
