= London Superloop =

Express bus network in London

Superloop

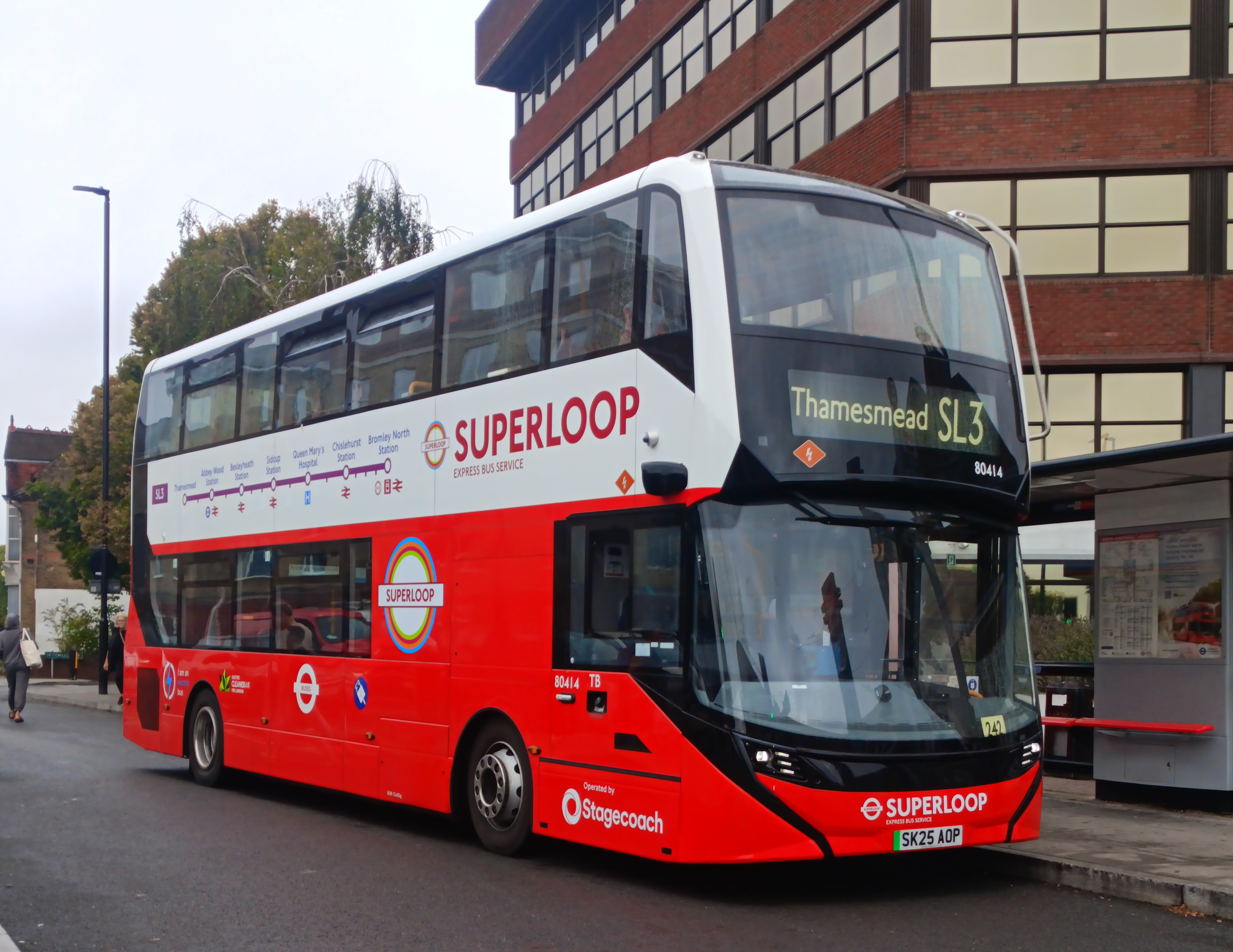
- A Superloop branded bus on route SL3
- Parent: Transport for London
- Founded: 15 July 2023
- Headquarters: London
- Locale: Greater London
- Service type: Express bus service
- Routes: 13 operational; 3 planned

Superloop is an express bus network in Greater London, England, that forms part of the London Buses network and connects Outer London town centres, railway stations and transport hubs.

Orbital express bus routes were proposed in 2008 by Mayor of London Boris Johnson, with further proposals by the London Assembly in 2017. The 'Superloop' concept was announced in 2023 by Johnson's successor, Sadiq Khan, consisting of renumbering and improvements to existing express bus routes and the introduction of new express bus routes.

As of September 2026, there are thirteen Superloop routes. There are five radial routes and eight orbital services. Superloop forms an incomplete ring around London.

The first service became operational on 15 July 2023. All ten of the first phase of routes are operational as of April 2025. Bus stops served by Superloop routes have specific branding to differentiate. Three routes of the second phase are operational, and three more are planned.

== History ==
=== Background ===
A network of Green Line limited stop orbital routes was established by the London Transport Executive from 1953. Limited stop route X26 (now Superloop route SL7) from West Croydon to Heathrow Airport is a remnant of that network.

The 2008 mayoral election manifesto of Boris Johnson promised to trial orbital express bus routes in the outer suburbs. This led to an increase in frequency for the already existing X26 express bus route later that year. The policy had been abandoned by Johnson by March 2010, citing "plenty of good studies now which suggest to me that the big investment in orbital bus routes does not actually deliver the improvements that are sometimes claimed" and there was no further expansion of the orbital network.

Sadiq Khan became Mayor of London in 2016. In August 2017 the London Assembly Transport Committee called for more orbital and express bus routes in Outer London. The idea was included in the Mayor's Transport Strategy published in March 2018, with two new indicative express corridors in North London and one in South London:

- Heathrow Airport to Ilford via Harrow, Barnet and Enfield
- Chiswick to Ilford via Ealing, Wood Green and Walthamstow
- Bexleyheath to Beckenham via Bromley

In 2018 Transport for London began a policy of reducing bus services in inner London, where there had been a drop in passenger numbers, with plans to increase services in the outer suburbs. Limited-stop route X140 from Harrow to Heathrow Airport was introduced in December 2019. The new route was considered a success, and expansion of the express bus network was included as a policy in the bus action plan published by Transport for London in March 2022.

=== Phase 1 ===
The Superloop branded proposal for a network of express orbital bus routes was announced on 28 March 2023 at a cost of £6 million. Transport for London noted that the proposals form part of improvements to transport in outer London in light of the expansion of the Ultra Low Emission Zone (ULEZ) in August 2023. The proposal was praised by the Campaign for Better Transport and Heathrow Airport Holdings; however, Nick Rogers AM of the Conservative Party called the proposal a "superflop" drawing attention to the "repacking of existing [bus] routes". Caroline Pidgeon AM of the Liberal Democrats cautiously welcomed the proposals, following her previous campaigns for orbital bus services. Public consultations on the five entirely new routes that were announced took place between April and September 2023.

On 28 April 2023 further details of the proposals were announced and a consultation opened for route X183. On 9 June 2023 a consultation opened for route X34. On 14 July 2023 it was announced that route SL8, a renumbering of existing route 607, would be the first to operate as part of the Superloop service from the following day. The proposed route from Walthamstow to Royal Docks was revised to terminate at North Woolwich and, at the same time, the proposed route from Bexleyheath to Bromley was revised to terminate at Thamesmead.

On 7 September 2023 it was announced that routes SL1 and SL10 would be introduced in autumn 2023. Two stops in South Chingford and two stops in Meridian Water were added to the route of SL1 following feedback to the public consultation.

On 20 October 2023 it was announced that routes SL2 and SL3 would be introduced in spring 2024. On 5 December 2023 it was announced that route SL5 would be introduced on 3 February 2024. In March 2024, the first phase was completed, with an additional route SL4 introduced when the Silvertown Tunnel opened on 7 April 2025.

In 2024, Transport for London released an update of how well the Superloop bus routes were doing. Routes SL1, SL5 and SL10 were performing well and/or better than the contractual minimum standards, with bus speeds in line with expected performance. Routes SL2 and SL3 continue to improve, routes SL6, SL8 and SL9 have not met performance standards, and route SL7 is susceptible to traffic conditions due to it being the longest bus route in London at 23.75 miles.

=== Phase 2 ===
During the 2024 London mayoral election, Mayor of London Sadiq Khan proposed an additional 10 Superloop routes across London, as well as an express bus route via Old Kent Road prior to construction of the Bakerloo line extension taking place.

Proposals for routes BL1 (Waterloo to Lewisham, connecting with the Bakerloo line), SL11 (North Greenwich to Abbey Wood, connecting with the SL3) and SL12 (Gants Hill to Rainham, connecting with the SL2) were announced in January 2025. Route BL1 was introduced on 27 September 2025, being free for its first week of service. Route SL11 was introduced on 24 January 2026, being free for its first week of service, replacing the daytime service on 24-hour route 472 while also taking a direct route in Woolwich. Route SL12 was introduced on 5 September 2026, being free for its first week of service.

== Routes ==
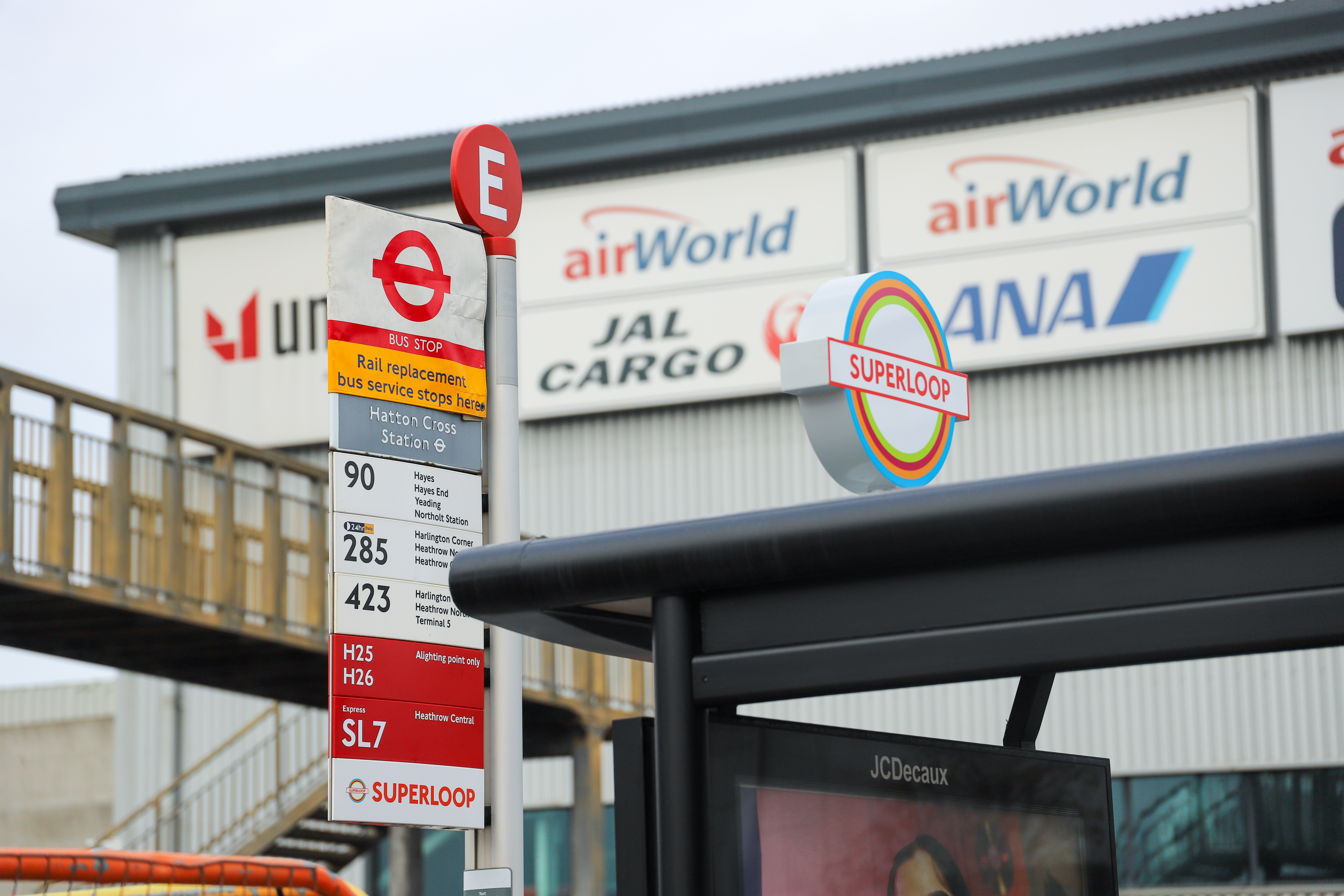
Bus stop served by route SL7 outside Hatton Cross station

Superloop is part of the London Buses network, with the same fares as normal buses. It was introduced in stages, with routes 607, X26, X68 and X140 being renumbered SL8, SL7, SL6 and SL9 respectively.

Superloop routes in the first phase have route numbers in the series SL1, SL2, SL3 up to SL10. The numbers are assigned clockwise around London from North Finchley. The numbers replace previous route identification and supplant the X series of route numbers that were used in the planning of routes X34 and X183 before they were renumbered to SL1 and SL10 respectively.

=== Operational routes ===
As of September 2026, the thirteen operational Superloop routes are as follows:

Operational routes
Route number	Colour	Type	Start	End	History	Introduced / renumbered	Operator
BL1		Radial	London Waterloo station	Lewisham Shopping Centre	Public consultation 31 January–14 March 2025.	27 September 2025	London General (Go-Ahead London)
SL1		Orbital	North Finchley bus station	Walthamstow Central station	Public consultation 9 June–21 July 2023 as X34. Introduced as SL1.	9 December 2023	Arriva London
SL2		Orbital	Walthamstow bus station	North Woolwich	Public consultation 21 July–4 September 2023.	2 March 2024	Arriva London
SL3		Orbital	Thamesmead	Bromley North railway station	Public consultation 21 July–4 September 2023.	24 February 2024	Selkent (Stagecoach London)
SL4		Radial	Grove Park	Westferry Circus	Originally proposed as part of the Silvertown Tunnel proposals as X239. Introduced as SL4.	7 April 2025	Blue Triangle (Go-Ahead London)
SL5		Orbital	Bromley North railway station	Croydon town centre	Public consultation 21 July–4 September 2023.	3 February 2024	Arriva London
SL6 (Note: Runs on weekdays during peak hours only – towards Russell Square in the morning peak, and towards West Croydon in the evening peak.)		Radial	Russell Square	West Croydon bus station	Operated as X68 since 27 October 1986 and renumbered SL6 in July 2023.	31 July 2023	Arriva London
SL7		Orbital	West Croydon bus station	Heathrow Central bus station	Operated as X26 since April 2005 and renumbered SL7 in August 2023. Longest bus route in London.	19 August 2023	Metrobus (Go-Ahead London)
SL8		Radial	Uxbridge tube station	White City bus station	Operated as 607 since 21 July 1990 and renumbered SL8 in July 2023.	15 July 2023	Metroline
SL9		Orbital	Heathrow Central bus station	Harrow bus station	Operated as X140 since 7 December 2019 and renumbered SL9 in August 2023.	26 August 2023	London Sovereign (First Bus London)
SL10		Orbital	Harrow bus station	North Finchley bus station	Public consultation 28 April–12 June 2023 as X183. Introduced as SL10.	25 November 2023	London Sovereign (First Bus London)
SL11		Radial	North Greenwich bus station	Abbey Wood railway station	Formerly operated as 472. Public consultation 3 March–13 April 2025.	24 January 2026	London Central (Go-Ahead London)
SL12		Orbital	Gants Hill	Rainham	Public consultation 18 March–23 May 2025.	5 September 2026	Thameside (Stagecoach London)

=== Planned routes ===
As of September 2026, the three planned Superloop routes are as follows:

Planned routes
Route number	Colour	Type	Start	End	History	Status
SL13		Orbital	Ealing Broadway station	Hendon	Public consultation 10 September–22 October 2025.	
SL14		Radial	Stratford bus station	Chingford Hatch	Public consultation 25 September–5 November 2025.	To be introduced in 2027.
SL15		Orbital	Clapham Junction railway station	Eltham railway station	Public consultation 20 October–30 November 2025.	To be introduced in 2027.

== See also ==
- East London Transit
