= Chinese Garage =

Former garage in Beckenham, London

- The Chinese Garage, Beckenham
- Alternative names: Langley Park Garage

General information
- Coordinates: 51°23′56.2″N 0°1′7.0″W
- Construction started: 1928

The Chinese Garage is a former garage and petrol station situated in Beckenham in the London Borough of Bromley, on a roundabout linking Beckenham, Eden Park and Shortlands. Built in 1928 to a Japanese pagoda style design by Edmund B. Clarke, it was voted the most unusual garage in England in 2001. It currently hosts a Tesco Express and Majestic Wine store.

== History ==
Detail of roofing

The garage was built in 1928 to a design by Edmund B. Clarke in the style of a Japanese pagoda on land adjoining Stone Park Farm which was part of the Langley Court Estate. At that time Stone Park Avenue had not been laid out and the main traffic route was north–south between Beckenham and West Wickham; this accounts for the alignment of forecourt.

Local folklore suggests that the Langley Court's former owners, the Bucknell family, were shipping magnates that underwrote the Titanic. Subsequently when it sank they financially sank too, hence the sale of their estate. It is further reputed that during their travels, the Bucknells regularly visited the Far East and Japan and brought back many exotic plants for the Estate which is said to have inspired Clarke to build the Garage in its distinctly Japanese style. However, no traces of such planting survive today on the Estate to substantiate this claim. It may well be that the design was purely the whim of the architect and his client.

Because of its oriental appearance it became known locally as The Chinese Garage although the official name was Langley Park Garage until 1989. It is now a Grade II listed building.

The building was previously part of a Kia and Peugeot car dealership and is no longer used as a petrol garage but retains much of its historic character and the grounds and adjoining roundabout are planted in a complementary manner. The building now contains a Tesco Express and a Majestic wine shop. Bromley Council rejected plans for a Tesco express due to traffic and parking concerns in the area but was overruled by the Government

As of November 12, 2020 the garage was opened as a Majestic Wine store.

== Architectural awards ==
The Chinese Garage was the winner of a Better Petrol Stations competition organised by the Daily Express and the Gardeners' Guild in the 1930s and in 2001 was voted the most unusual garage in England.
