= On Tat Estate and On Tai Estate =

Housing estates in Sau Mau Ping, Kowloon

On Tat Estate On Tai Estate
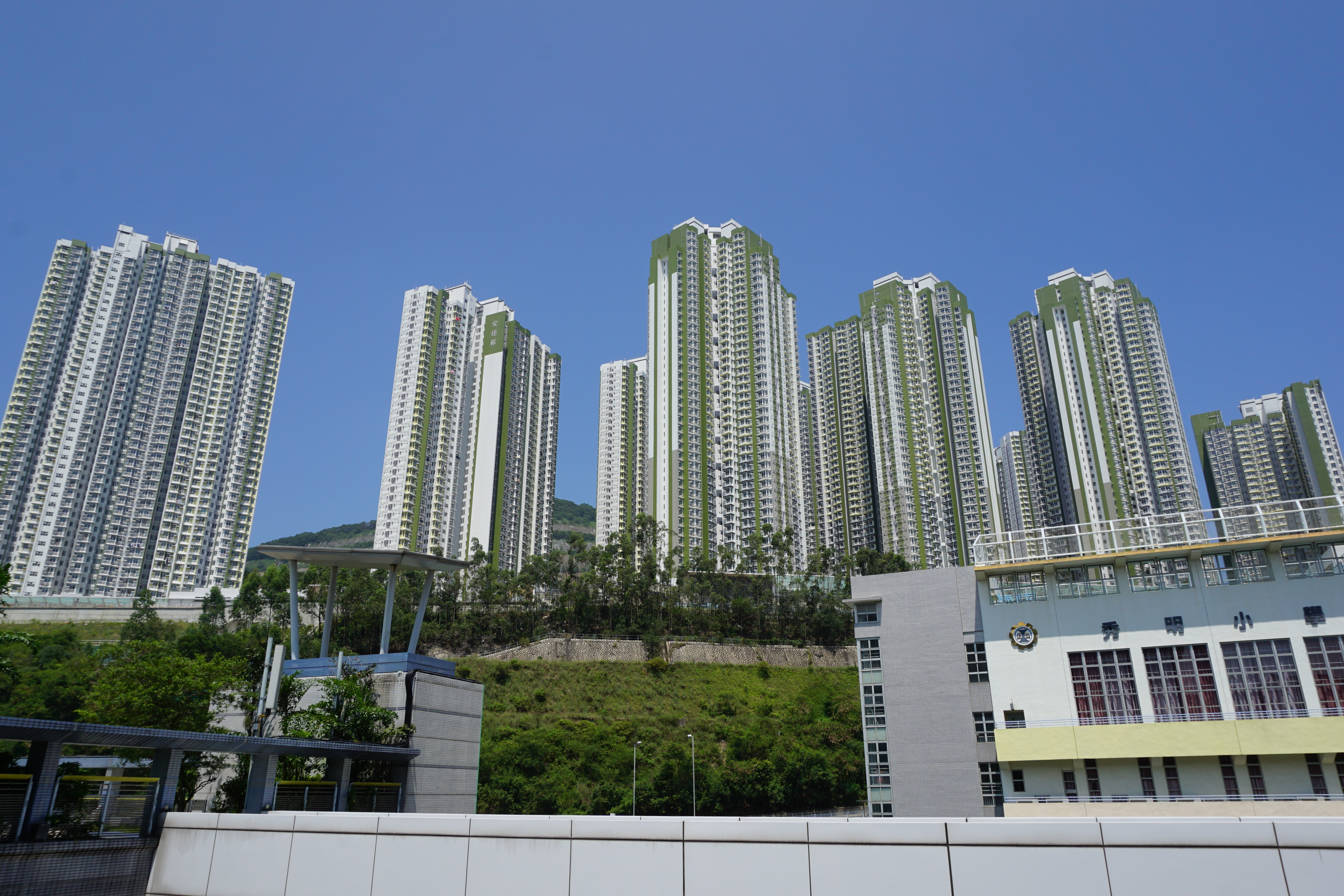
- On Tat Estate
- Interactive map of On Tat Estate; On Tai Estate

General information
- Location: 3 On Chui Street (On Tat Estate); 20 On Sau Road (On Tai Estate); Sau Mau Ping; Kowloon, Hong Kong
- Coordinates: 22.3207°N 114.2352°E
- Status: Completed
- Category: Public rental housing
- No. of blocks: 22
- No. of units: 17,917

Construction
- Constructed: 2016; 10 years ago (On Tat Estate); 2017; 9 years ago (On Tai Estate)
- Authority: Hong Kong Housing Authority

On Tat Estate (Chinese: 安達邨) and On Tai Estate (Chinese: 安泰邨) are Hong Kong public housing estates located on Anderson Road, Tai Sheung Tok, Sau Mau Ping, Kwun Tong District and the parts of Development at Anderson Road. The former comprises 11 blocks with a total of 9,356 flats while the latter comprises 11 blocks with 8,561 units.

== History ==
The site of the estates was formerly a vegetated hillslope below Anderson Road. Under the "Development at Anderson Road" (DAR) project, the site was reformed under the supervision of the Civil Engineering and Development Department (CEDD) to provide approximately 20 hectares of useable land. In addition to site formation, the DAR project included the construction of supporting infrastructure, including roads, drains, and engineered slopes. The buildable land was allocated for public housing development as well as supporting government, institutional, and community facilities. The DAR project, which cost HK$3.4 billion, was formally completed in December 2016.

The public housing component of the project, originally intended to provide 16,100 units for 48,000 people, was completed from 2016 to 2018. The housing blocks comprise On Tat and On Tai estates, which are located at either end of the dumbbell-shaped DAR site. They are linked by On Sau Road, which runs the length of the site and connects to New Clear Water Bay Road in the north and Po Lam Road in the south.

== Houses ==
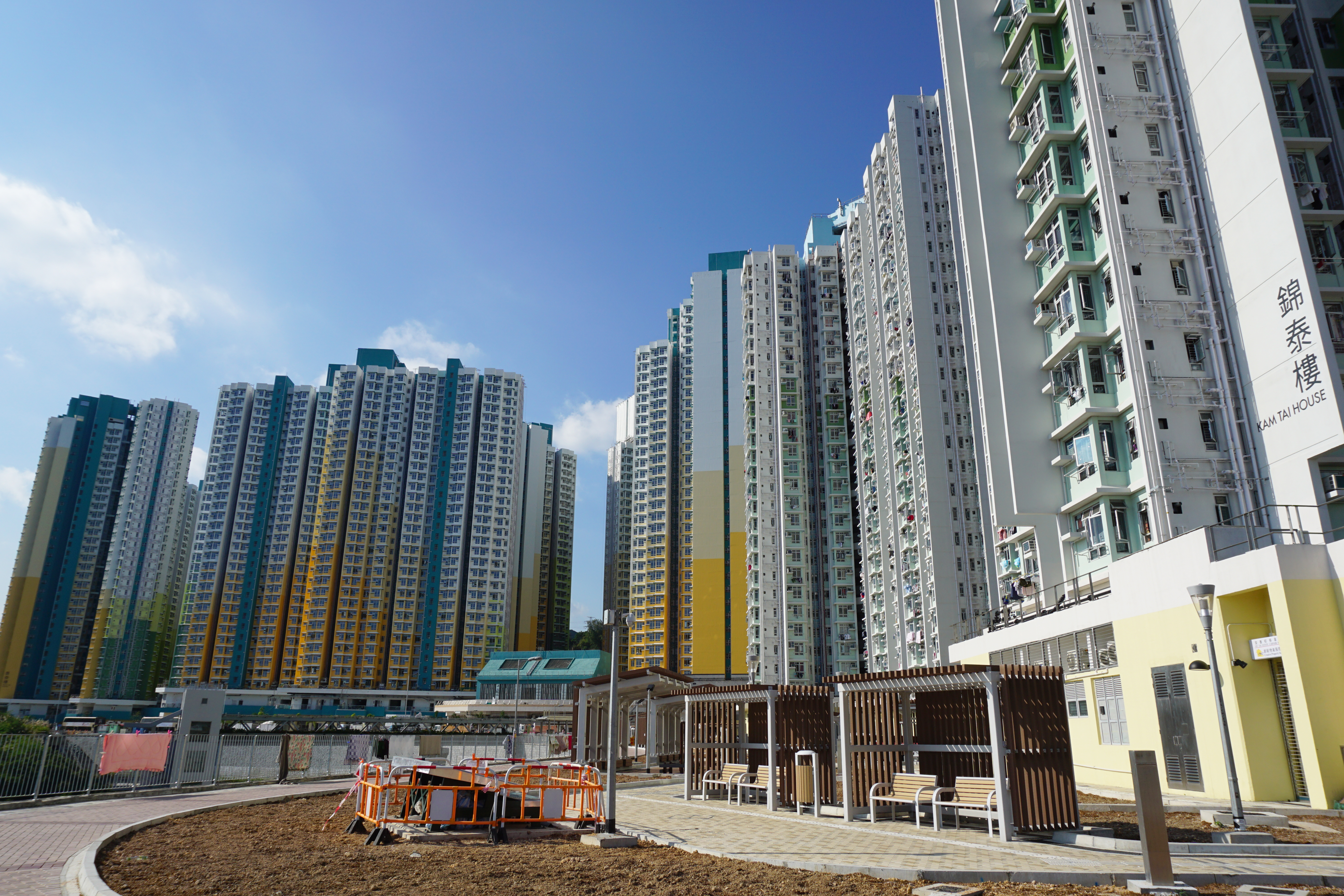
On Tai Estate

=== On Tat Estate ===
Name	Type	Completion
Yan Tat House	Non-standard	2016
Lai Tat House	Non-standard	2016
Oi Tat House	Non-standard	2016
Chun Tat House	Non-standard	2016
Hau Tat House	Non-standard	2016
Ching Tat House	Non-standard	2016
Sin Tat House	Non-standard	2016
Chi Tat House	Non-standard	2016
Shing Tat House	Non-standard	2016
Yin Tat House	Non-standard	2016
Him Tat House	Non-standard	2016

=== On Tai Estate ===
Name	Type	Completion
Ming Tai House	Non-standard	2017
Chi Tai House	Non-standard	2017
Yung Tai House	Non-standard	2017
Kam Tai House	Non-standard	2017
Kui Tai House	Non-standard	2018
Wo Tai House	Non-standard	2018
King Tai House	Non-standard	2018
Hang Tai House	Non-standard	2018
Tak Tai House	Non-standard	2018
Fung Tai House	Non-standard	2018
Shing Tai House	Non-standard	2018

=== COVID-19 pandemic ===
Chi Tai House at On Tai Estate was sealed on 23 February 2022. Ming Tai House was placed under lockdown on 24–25 February.

== Education ==
On Tat Estate is in Primary One Admission (POA) School Net 48. Within the school net are multiple aided schools (operated independently but funded with government money) and Kwun Tong Government Primary School.
