= BYD B series =

Electric bus manufactured by BYD

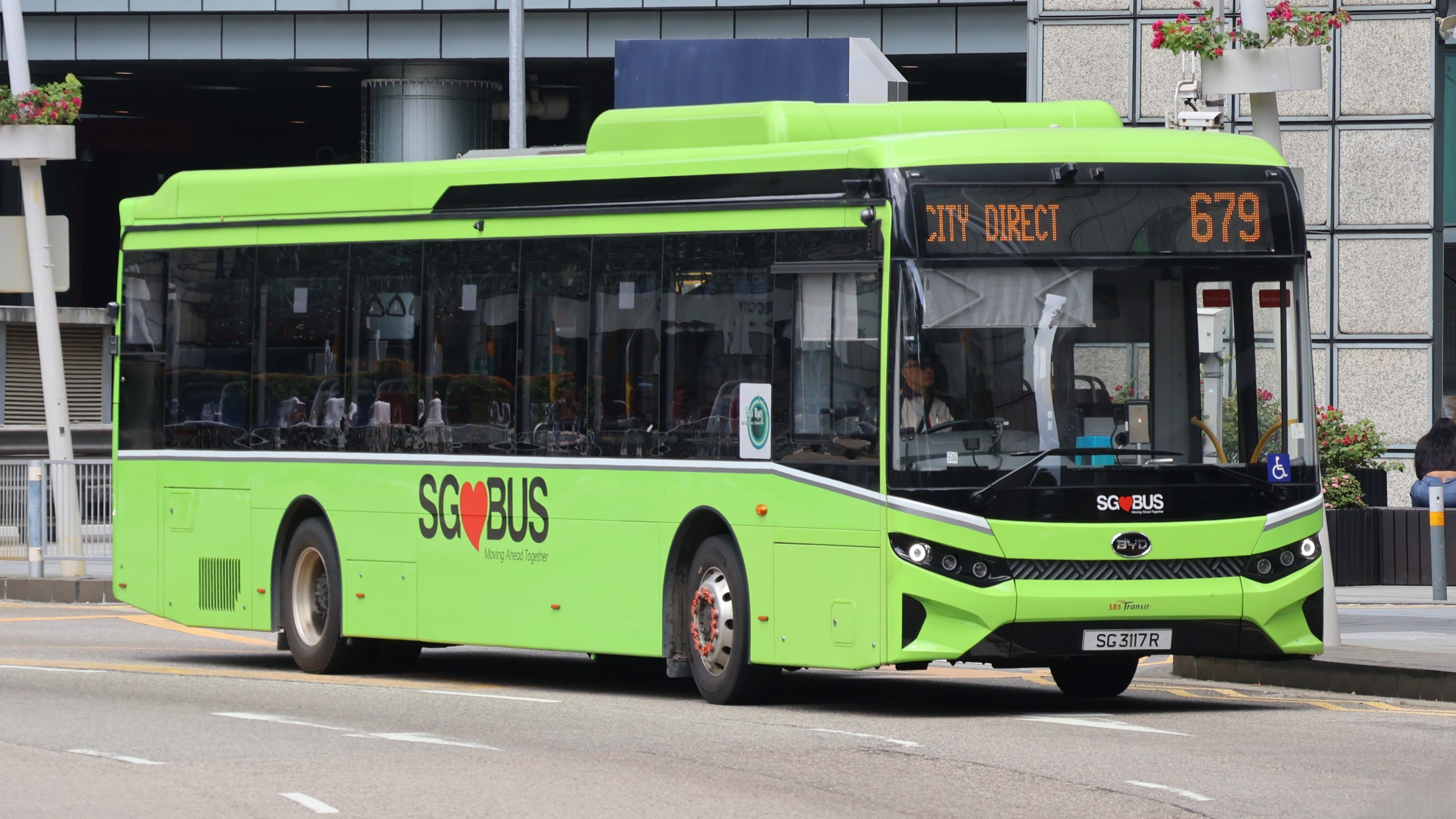
- A BYD B12A04 in Singapore, operated by SBS Transit

Overview
- Manufacturer: BYD Auto
- Production: 2020–present
- Assembly: China: Hangzhou, Zhuhai
- Designer: Wolfgang Egger

Body and chassis
- Class: Battery electric bus
- Body style: Single-deck bus, double-deck bus and articulated bus
- Doors: 2-3
- Floor type: Low floor

Powertrain
- Engine: Electric wheel hub motor (TZ2912XSB/TZ290XSE) or single motor (TZ240XSA/TZ400XSA)
- Electric motor: Permanent-magnet synchronous motors
- Propulsion: IGBT–VVVF
- Battery: 301 kWh (Chinese-market B10); 541 kWh (UK-market B10, B11 and B12); 348 kWh (Europe-market B11); 532 kWh (BD11A/BD11B); 355 kWh (Chinese-market B12)
- Electric range: 355 km (Chinese-market B10); 499 km (UK-market B10, B11 and B12); 315 km (Chinese-market B12)

Chronology
- Predecessor: BYD K series

The BYD B series are a line of battery electric buses produced by the Chinese vehicle manufacturer BYD. It is the first bus model powered by BYD's Lithium Iron Phosphate Blade electric-batteries. It is available as a 10-metre single-deck (B10), a 11-metre single-deck (B11), a 11-metre double-deck bus (BD11A/BD11B), a 12-metre single-deck (B12), a 12-metre tri-axle double-deck bus (B12D), a 15-metre tri-axle single-deck (B15) and a 18-metre articulated bus (B18).

== History ==
The BYD B series was launched on 29 July 2020, superseding the highly popular BYD K series. The bodywork was designed by Wolfgang Egger. According to BYD, the new bus models feature LED water lamps, USB charging ports, newer-generation wheel hub motors which are 6% more energy-efficient, as well as a lightweight aluminum frame reducing the body weight by up to 10%.

== Operations ==
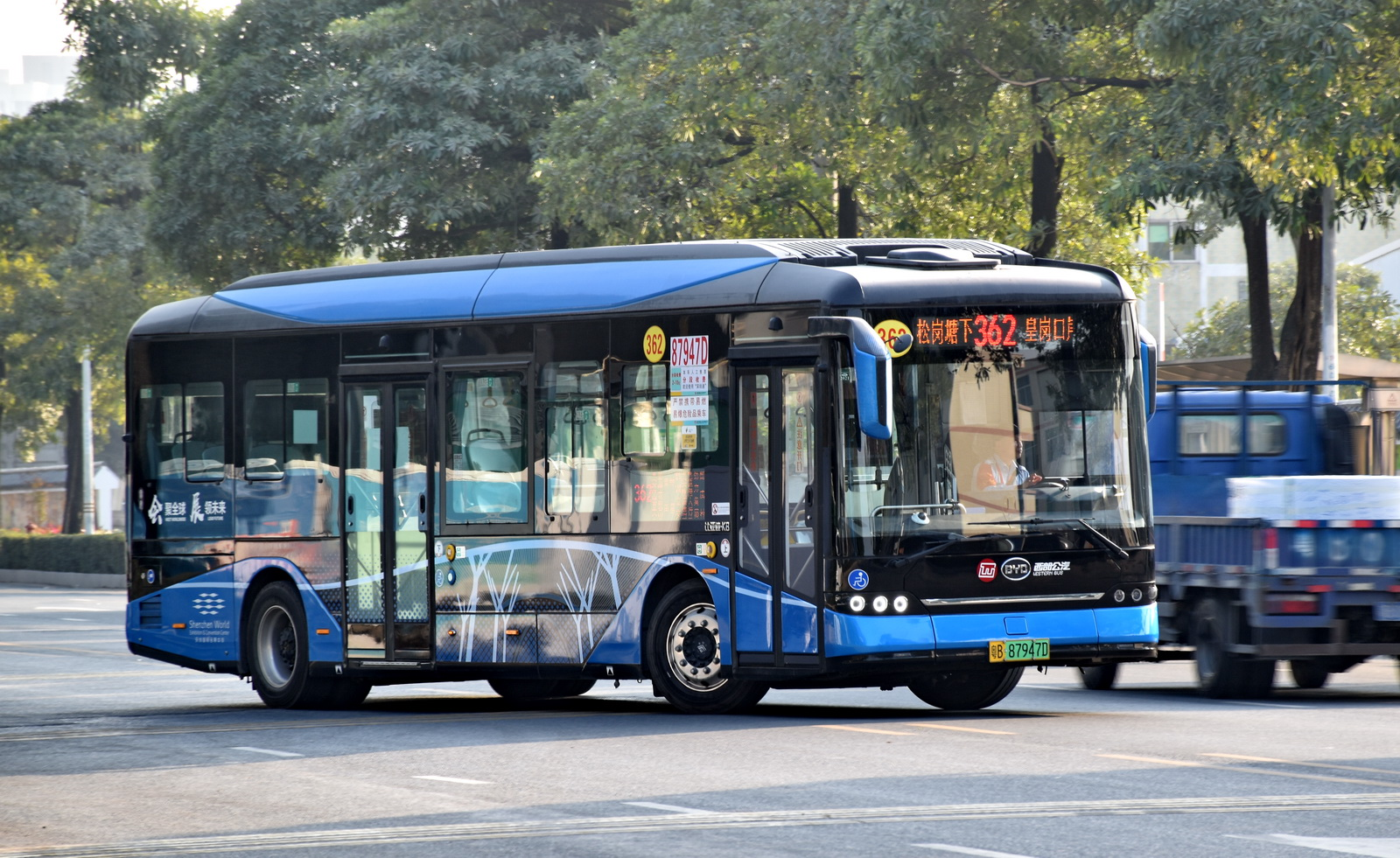
BYD B10 operated by Western Bus in Shenzhen

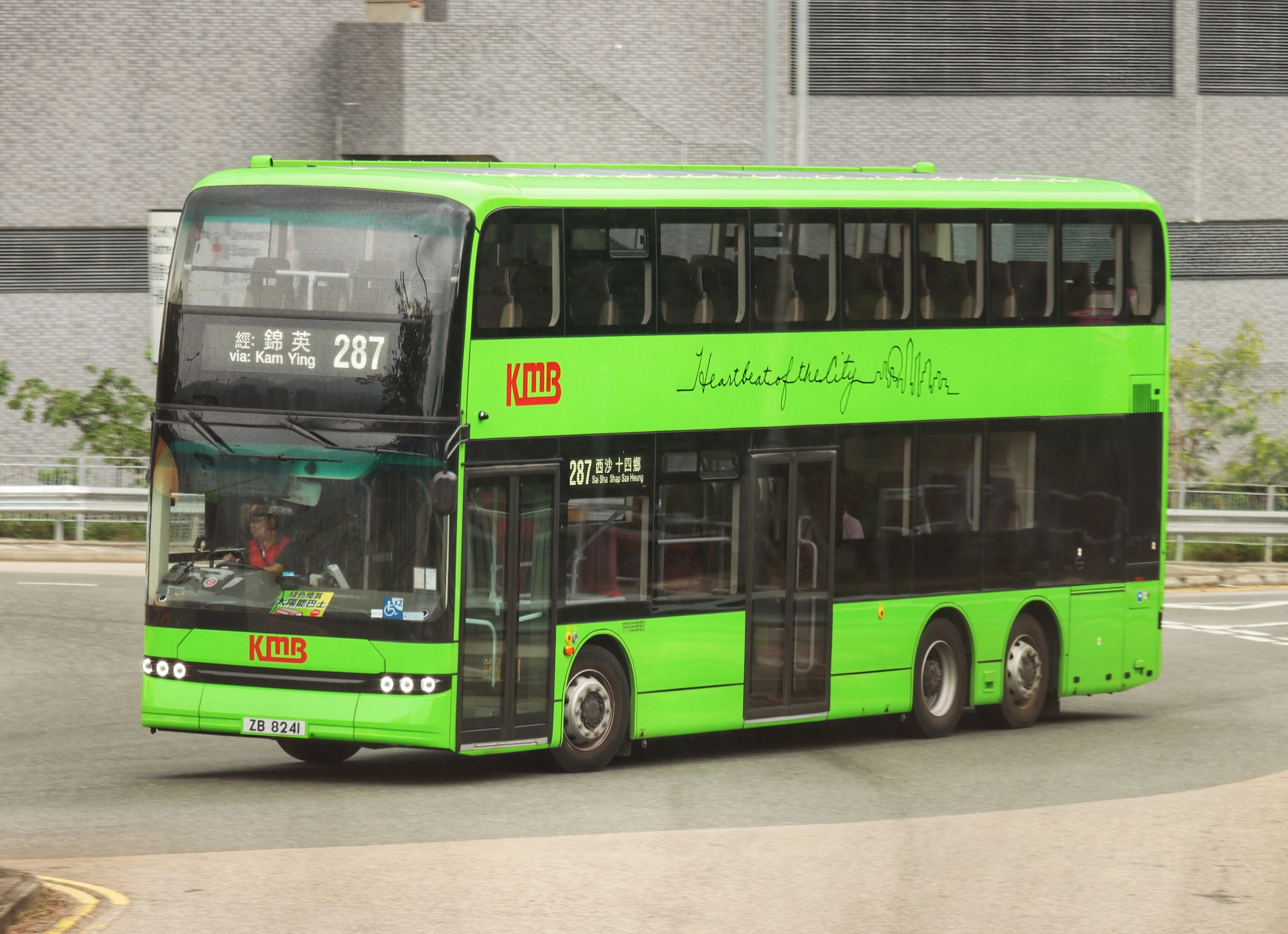
A BYD B12D double-decker bus of Kowloon Motor Bus in Hong Kong

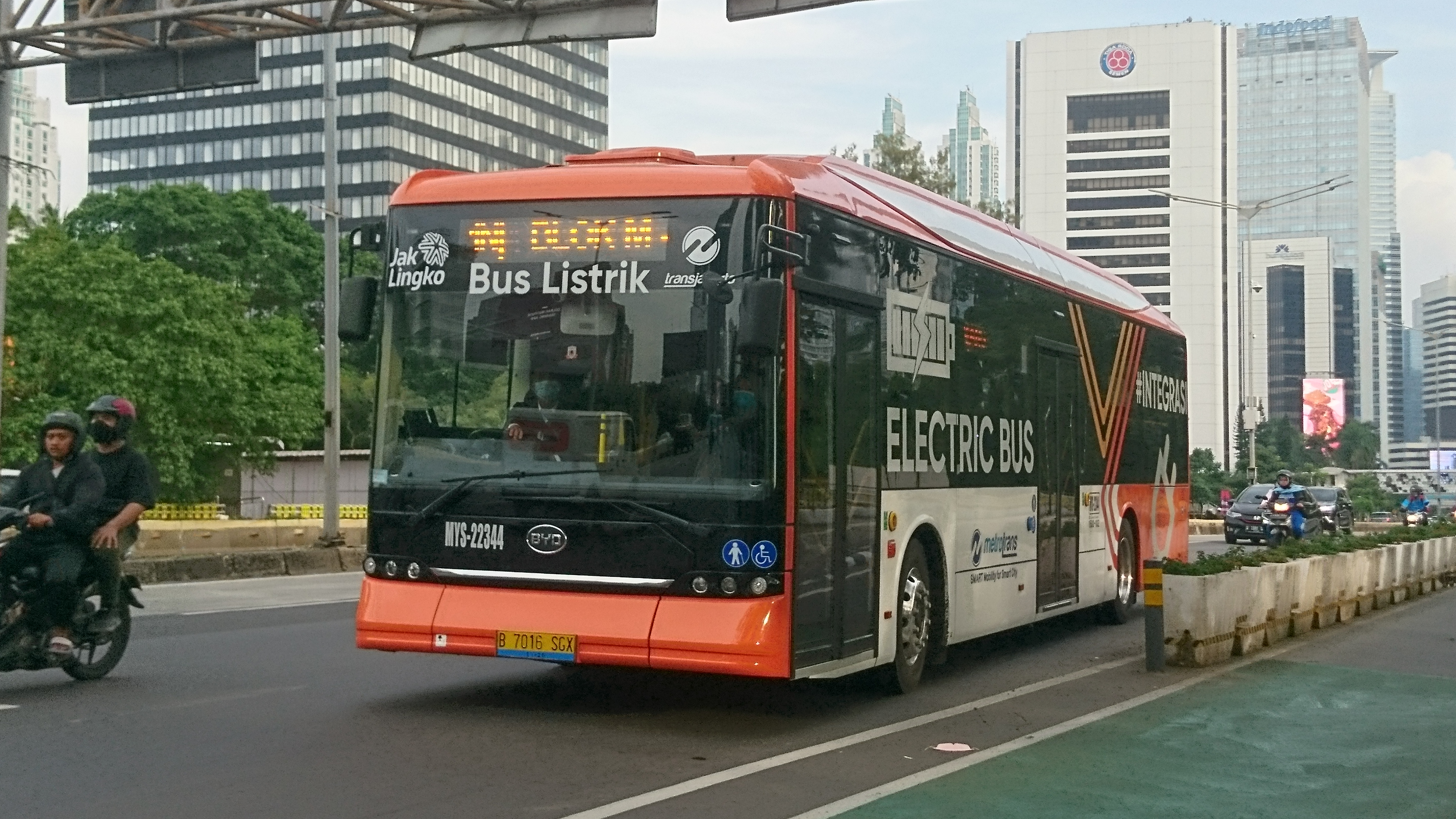
A BYD B12 bus arriving near Sudirman railway station, Jakarta

=== Mainland China ===
- Jinan: 340 BYD B10 buses were delivered in July 2022.
- Changzhou: The first B series buses entered service in 2021.
- Shenzhen:
  - Western Bus operated a fleet of 88 BYD B10s as of 2020.
  - 10 BYD B12D double decker buses are used for tourist sightseeing services debut in October 2020.
  - BYD BYD6871B2EV1 (B8) units was also first revenue service in 2021.
- Zhongshan: 50 BYD B10s were delivered in 2022.
- Yichang: A fleet of 10 BYD B18s entered service on the local BRT line.
- Many other Chinese cities have bought the B10 or B12, including Wuhan, Guangzhou (as GAC BYD), Guiyang and Changzhou.

=== Asia Pacific ===
- Hong Kong:
  - 16 BYD B12A buses entered service with Kowloon Motor Bus in 2022. These electric buses were the first B series buses built to right hand drive specification.
  - 41 BYD B12D buses were also delivered to KMB in 2023. These buses were first deployed on route 213M in July that year.
- Japan: 2 B10 units entered service with Keihin Kyuko Bus in 2024.
- Indonesia: 30 B12As were delivered to TransJakarta in 2022.
- Singapore:
  - In November 2022, ComfortDelGro took delivery of several BYD B12A03 buses with three doors, to be used on Internal Shuttle Bus services (ISB) within the National University of Singapore and Nanyang Technological University. These buses, along with Zhongtong N12 buses which entered service earlier, will gradually replace all diesel-powered buses on ISB routes.
  - A BYD B12A03 single-decker, also featuring three doors, was showcased at the Singapore International Transport Congress & Exhibition 2022.
  - On 25 November 2023, the Land Transport Authority (LTA) announced that it had awarded a contract to BYD to deliver 240 BYD GTK6127BEVB (BC12A04) buses, with an option for 60 more exercised on 23 October 2024. They had entered revenue service on 2 December 2024, initially deployed by SBS Transit on bus routes 86, 107/107M and 159. In October 2025, SMRT Buses also began to operate this model. Also, LTA also ordered 160 BYD GTK6127BEVB3 (BC12E03) single deckers on 2025, and will be delivering from September 2026.
  - A new BYD GTK6127BEVS (BC12A05) (sold as B12DS) electric double-decker 3-door and 2-staircase bus made its debut in Singapore International Transport Congress & Exhibition (SITCE) 2024. This BYD GTK6127BEVS (BC12A05) was specially designed for the Singapore market, with bodywork by Zhuhai Guangtong Vehicle Manufacture. A demonstrator model is currently awaiting trial as of 2026.
  - In July 2025, a new batch of 14 BYD GTK6127BEVB (BC12A04) single-decker buses were delivered to Tower Transit Singapore for use on a 5-year operating contract on the island of Sentosa.

=== Europe ===
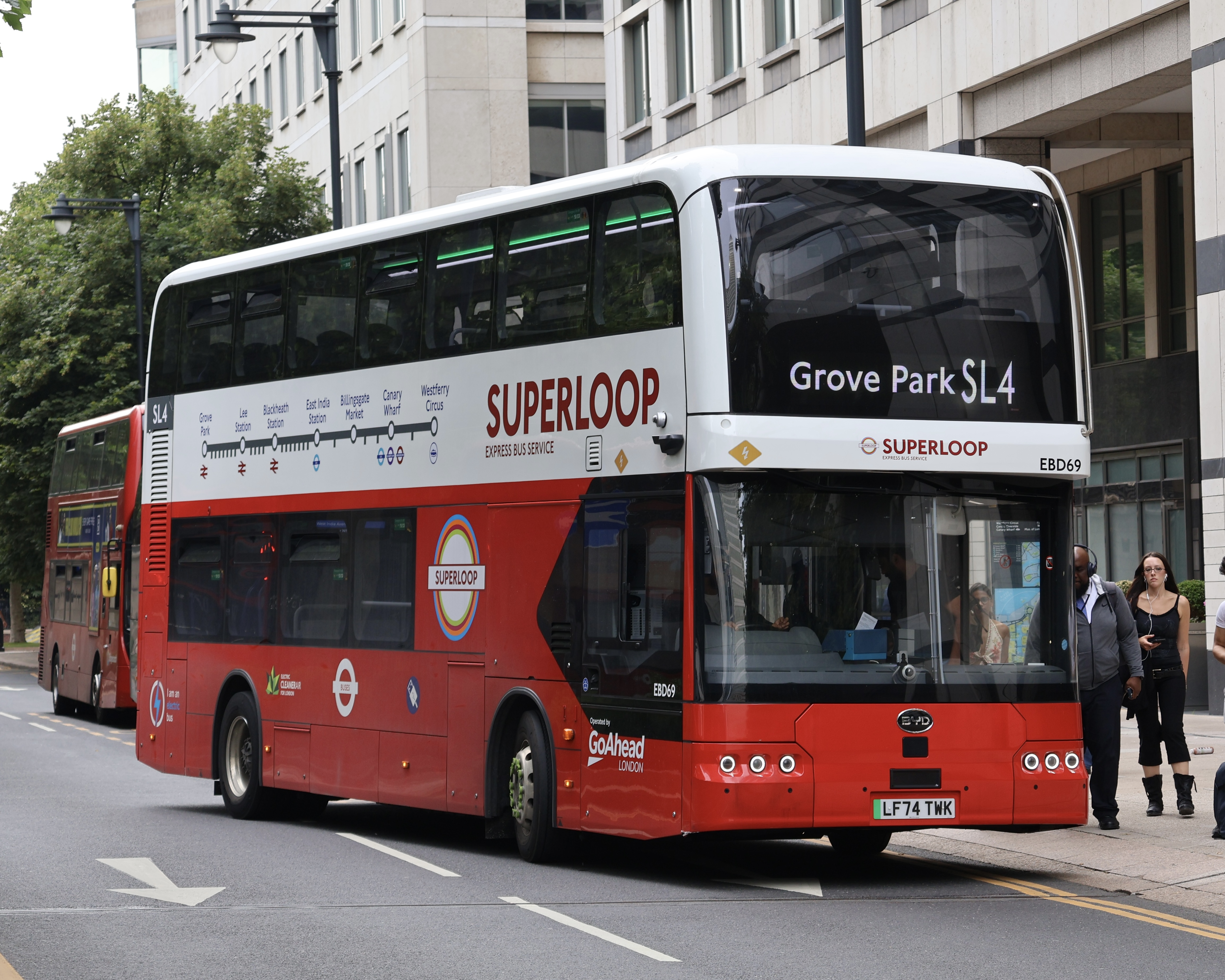
A BYD BD11B in London on London Buses route SL4

- Finland: Nobina ordered 42 B15s for service in Turku.
- United Kingdom: BYD BD11s entered service for Transport for London (TfL) contractors in December 2024. Additionally, BYD B10 and B11 single-deck electric buses have also been made to TfL specification and entered service in 2026. The first BD11s for an operator outside London were delivered to Arriva Northumbria for service in Northumberland and Tyne and Wear in May 2026. In November 2026, BYD split the BD11 into two variants, the BYD BD11A (low-height provincial variant) and the BYD BD11B (standard variant, including ones built to Transport for London specification). These two variants were revealed at the Euro Bus Expo in Birmingham on 4 November 2026.
- Hungary: ArrivaBus Kft. operates 58 eBus B12.B and 24 eBus B19 buses in Budapest on behalf of BKK (Centre for Budapest Transport); the first B12.Bs entered service in December 2025, with the first B19s following in April 2026. Kaposvári Közlekedési Zrt. ordered 10 eBus B12.B and 3 eBus B19 buses for Kaposvár, which entered service in August 2026. MVK Zrt. ordered 4 eBus B19s for Miskolc, which entered service in March 2026.

=== South America ===
==== Chile ====
In May 2023, public-private company Metbus, which operates bus services for Red Metropolitana de Movilidad, the Chilean capital Santiago's public transport authority, imported and tested a single B18 articulated bus as part of a pilot program to test the model, with the goal of eventually renovating its entire articulated bus fleet with battery powered buses, during which it registered an overall energy consumption of 13% compared to their older models. As of November of that year, the firm stated that it had very positive views on the bus' performance and was permitted to run it until March 2024, having already pledged to renovate its entire 160-strong articulated bus fleet once financial conditions improve. In October of that year, 10 B12 double-decker buses entered service on Route 520, a temporary bus service operated by Metbus that was originally meant to run during the events of the 2023 Pan American and Parapan American Games, before Red Movilidad prolonged the service to 24 February due to the positive reception of the double-decker buses by its riders. On 27 March 2024, Metbus started running their B12 double-decker buses on Route 555, which runs from Pajaritos metro station to Santiago's main airport, while the company studied other possible routes to run the buses in.

On 30 September 2025, Metbus imported 10 new double-decker buses and permanently assigned them to Red Movilidad's Route 519, which was extended to run between Peñalolén and Pajaritos metro station, coinciding with Chile's hosting of the 2025 FIFA U-20 World Cup. By December, Metbus had a total fleet of 950 electric buses, 30 of which are B12C01 double-deckers, and 94 are a fleet of brand new B18C01 articulated buses for use on Routes 406 and 506, both being the busiest bus routes in Santiago.

=== Oceania ===
==== Australia ====
- Sydney: Transport for NSW purchased 95 BYD BC12A06 in 2026 with Volgren Optimus bodywork for Transit Systems NSW

== Awards ==
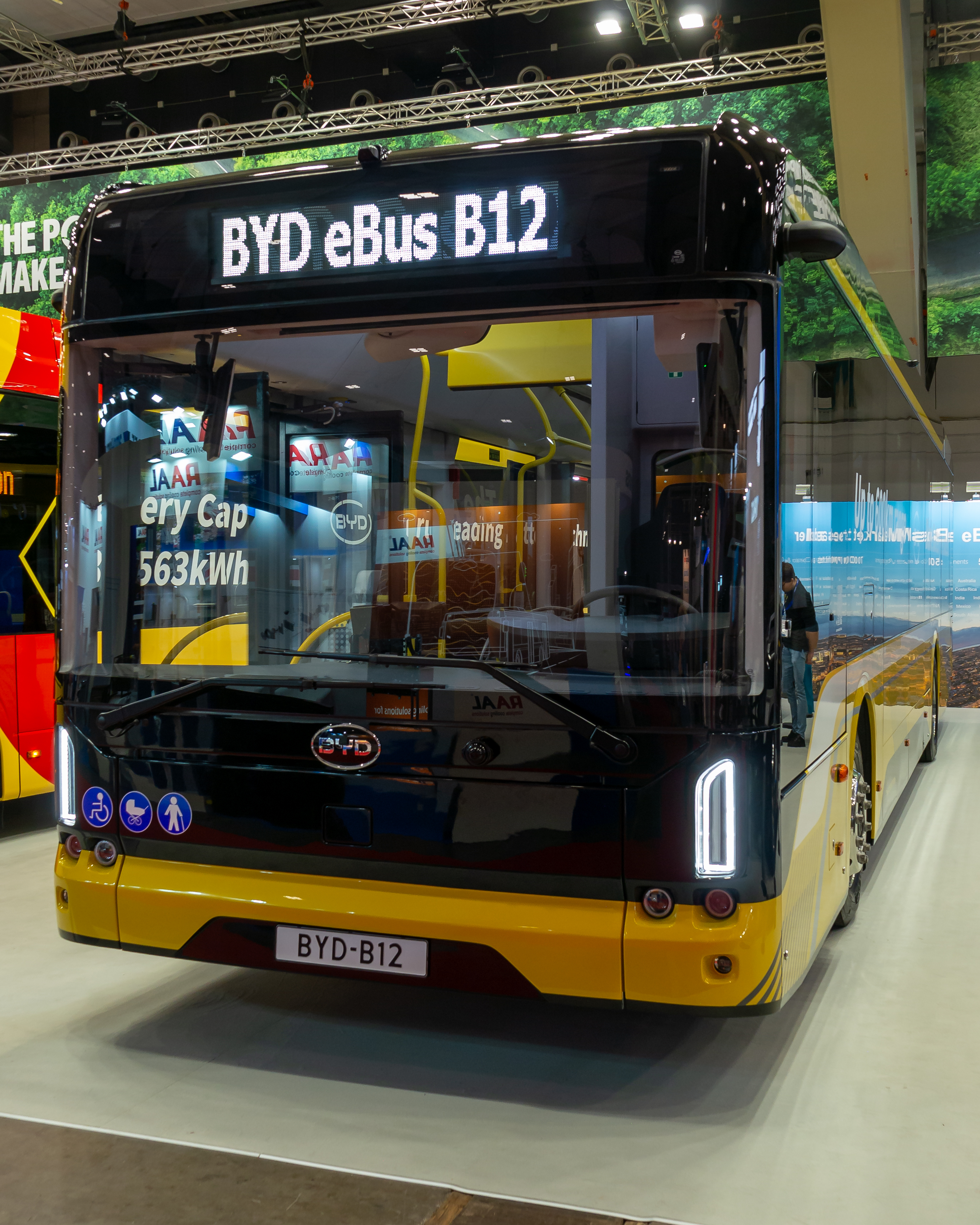
B12 at Busworld Europe 2023

On 7 January 2022, it was announced that the BYD B10 had won the "2021 Transporter Word-of-Mouth New Energy Bus Award".
