= Wrexham bus station =

Bus terminus and interchange in Wrexham, Wales

Wrexham bus station Gorsaf fysiau Wrecsam
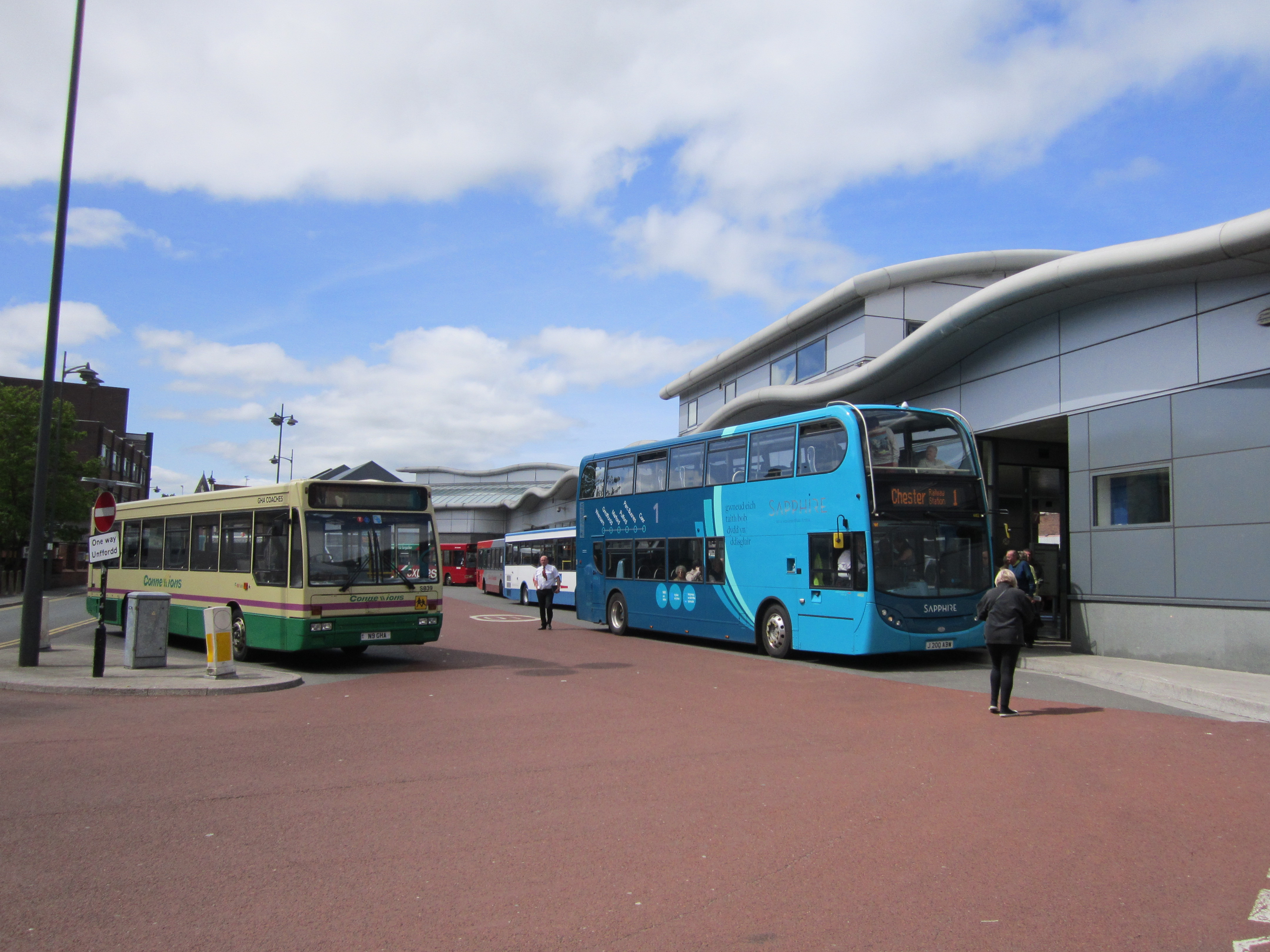
- The bus station in 2013, with an Arriva Sapphire service (centre)

General information
- Location: Lord Street, Wrexham; Wrexham County Borough; Wales
- Coordinates: 53.048009°N 2.996197°W
- System: Bus station
- Owner: Wrexham County Borough Council
- Operator: Wrexham County Borough Council
- Bus routes: 33
- Bus stands: Total: 8 stands
- Bus operators: Arriva Buses Wales, Stagecoach Merseyside & South Lancashire, TrawsCymru, Wrexham Taxis, Pat's Coaches, D&G Bus, Lloyds Coaches, Tanat Valley Coaches, Valentine Travel
- Connections: Chester, Oswestry, Llangollen, Mold, Denbigh, Whitchurch, Barmouth, Machynlleth

Construction
- Structure type: Modern steel and glass building, cafes, toilets and a link to Wrexham General railway station
- Parking: At the nearby Library Car Park and Guildhall Car Park
- Cycle facilities: Racks
- Accessible: Level boarding

Other information
- Station code: wrejgwg
- Website: traveline.info

History
- Opened: 1 December 2003

Services
168,000
Location

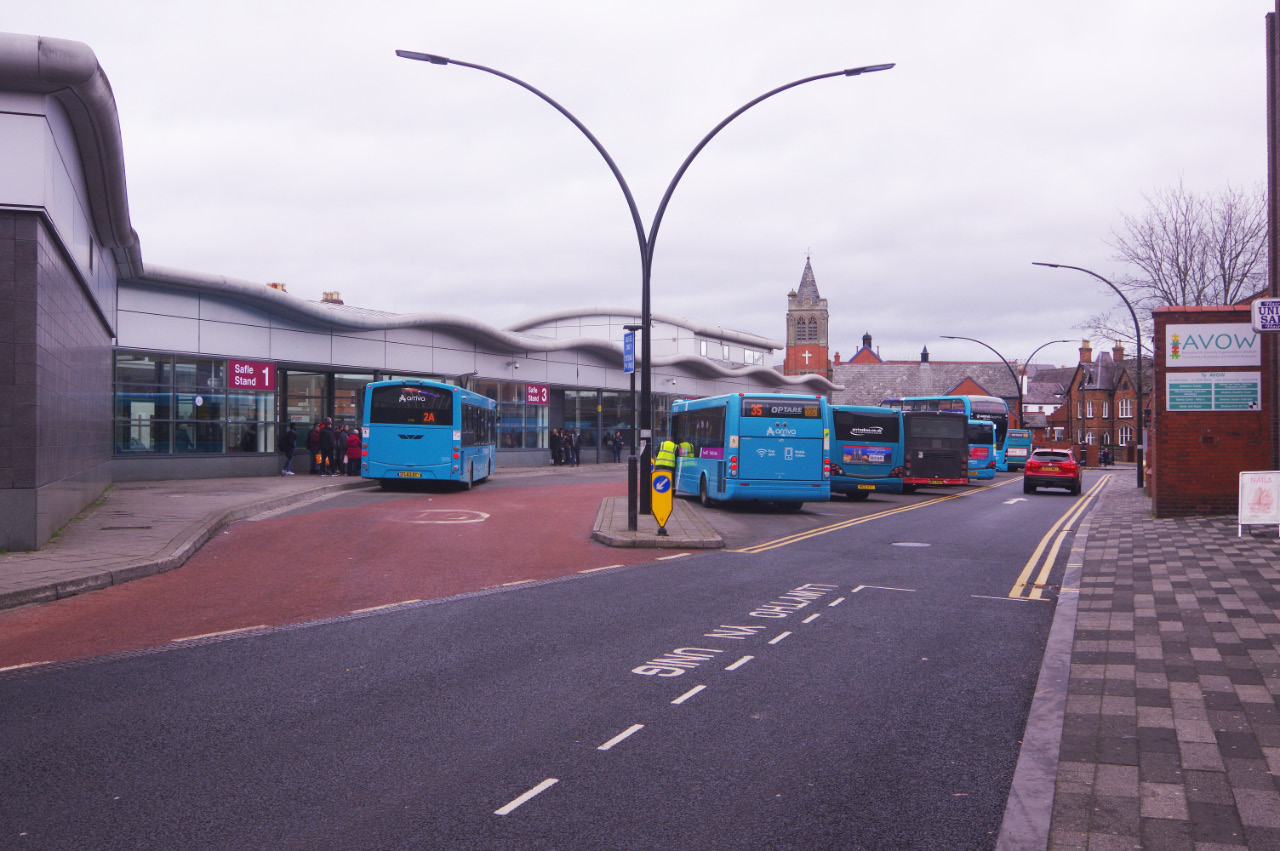
The bus stands in February 2019

Wrexham bus station (Welsh: Gorsaf fysiau Wrecsam) is an eight-stand indoor bus station in Wrexham city centre on King Street. Services provide transit within the city, elsewhere in north Wales, and to Cheshire and Shropshire in England.

The station sees over 180,000 departures per year, which the council says makes the station one of the "busiest in Wales".

The facility forms part of the roadmap for the Welsh Government's North Wales Metro in the city and the region.

== History ==
A new complex was opened in two halves in December 2003, on the site of the original bus station which was originally built in the late 1960s with the adjacent office buildings.

The original station had much graffiti on its aging steel bus stands, and main brick building, which housed a small newsagents.

== Modern form ==
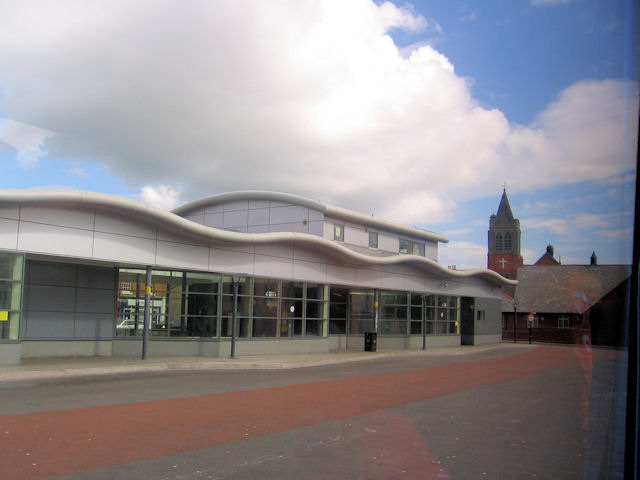
The bus stands viewed from a vehicle departing the station (2009)

While the original bus station was redeveloped, use was made of the wide pavement area of King Street as temporary locations for the bus stands. The new bus station features a number of small shops, varying from newsagents to a Fat Cat Cafe Bar.

Most services are operated by Arriva Buses Wales, which operates the longest routes using Wright Commander buses, however GHA Coaches at one time operated several services before their collapse (see Controversies below). A number of smaller firms also operate from the bus station.

In 2013 the station benefitted from a £1.4m improvement project, which saw the installation of wider pavements, shop fronts, walls and other infrastructure. The scheme was backed by the European Regional Development Fund.

== Improvements ==
The Bus station received a £250,000 grant from the Welsh Government in February 2019 intended for "refurbished toilets, new bins, real time information screens and an external clean-up."

Wrexham Council announced in 2019 it was considering a range of methods to improve the image of the bus station after much negative press attention. Solutions discussed included enhanced CCTV, increased fees for bus companies rest facilities, increased departure charges, and a new three-year contract to reopen the information centre. A new route opened that month introducing services to HM Prison Berwyn, one of the largest employers in the region near Wrexham industrial estate.

In May 2019 the Welsh Government rolled out discounted My Travel Pass products for those between 16 and 21 in the Wrexham area, reducing fares by 30%.

In June 2019 in response to social issues in and around the bus station, a Salvation Army Community Care Hub was promoted to "bring together the Department for Work and Pensions, GPs, chiropodists, health visitors and mental health, housing and crime reduction teams." The project has been supported by First Minister Mark Drakeford and it is aimed at resolving deprivation and poverty in the city centre. The Leader of Flintshire Council however criticised the Welsh Government for their failure to push forward the North Wales Metro and asked where the £50m spending pledged for the project was being used. A Welsh Government spokesperson however said a Transport for Wales business unit has been established in North Wales to support it, beginning with improvements to the Wrexham-Bidston line, improved access to and within Deeside Industrial Park with a focus on bus and active travel, and spending on the Wrexham bus station.

The Council is undertaking a scheme of works in the area surrounding the bus station, including work to improve Regent Street, Hope Street, and Queen's Square. Further work will involve rollout of LED lighting across the city centre and work to the area around St Giles Church and the neighbouring streets.

On 24 August 2019 the station's waiting area was closed from "8pm Monday to Saturday and throughout Sundays" to reduce anti social behaviour which had become prevalent at night. The Council state the work is part of a scheme of improvements to the bus station, including "refurbished toilets, new bins, external clearing and cleaning works and digital timetables." The improvements are funded by a £250,000 grant from the Welsh Government.

In September 2019 MP Ian Lucas criticised the bus station for failing to provide adequate services to Wrexham Maelor Hospital. Welsh Government Economy and Transport minister Ken Skates responded by stating they are "investing more than £10 million" in transport improvements including planning a "Wrexham General integrated transport hub".

== Controversies ==
The bus industry in the region saw extensive issues around 2016, with the collapse of GHA Coaches which led threats to school bus contracts, nearly 400 people facing redundancy, and the loss of a number of local services.

In 2017, the bus station and area gained notoriety in the national press with the nickname "Spice Town", after bus driver Gavin Rodda received social media attention for highlighting photos of drug users and paraphernalia in the area. The issue led to meetings between Welsh Government ministers and North Wales Police and Crime Commissioner Arfon Jones. Hugh Jones of Wrexham council told the BBC that there had been a "significant increase in anti-social behaviour in the past two years". He stated, however, that improvements had been made following the introduction of a public space protection order, and collaboration with agencies such as Cais and the Wallich.

In September 2018 it was reported that a homeless man had entered the bus station and threatened to "stab people" during a 12-minute episode which was seen by children. The BBC reported that the city now had 44 rough sleepers, the second most in Wales after Cardiff, and homelessness volunteers urged the public to "speak to" and "befriend" the homeless in the community. A session held by volunteers attracted over 100 supporters.

In October 2018 proposals were made to reduce disabled parking spots at the station, however these were rejected by Wrexham Council after receiving significant complaints from voluntary groups in the area.

In January 2019 a security officer at the station was accused and later convicted of assaulting another man while travelling on a bus service which came to a stop.

In February 2019, further issues arose when Arriva Buses Wales withdrew two services from operation, describing them as "not commercially viable". The Welsh Government criticised 1980s bus deregulation as creating significant problems for communities. A local councillor blamed the cancellations on a "lack of competition".

In March 2019 the EasyCoach service which operated from the station received press attention when it had its license suspended, as a result of an incident which saw a "wheel come off a vehicle". Another incident took place that month, with armed police stopping a Wrexham to Chester bus service in Gresford, boarding the vehicle with weapons to search for a "specific individual". Incidents of police searches were reported across Wrexham and Chester bus services. A councillor stated at the time that the Wrexham bus industry was at "breaking point".

In July 2019 issues arose at the station when the operator of the EasyCoach service collapsed, and franchise holder Transervis Ltd closed the station information office in the process. MP for Wrexham Ian Lucas also raised fears for the station when it was announced that the taskforce of police, health and other officials dealing with drug issues in and around the area would be disbanded.

== Destinations ==
Bus services run from the station to Chester, Oswestry, Llangollen, Mold, Denbigh, Whitchurch, Barmouth, and Machynlleth. Wrexham Central railway station and Wrexham General railway station are within a five and ten minute walk from the bus station respectively.

== See also ==
- List of bus stations in Wales
- Transport in Wales
