= Chester Bus Interchange =

Bus station in Chester, England

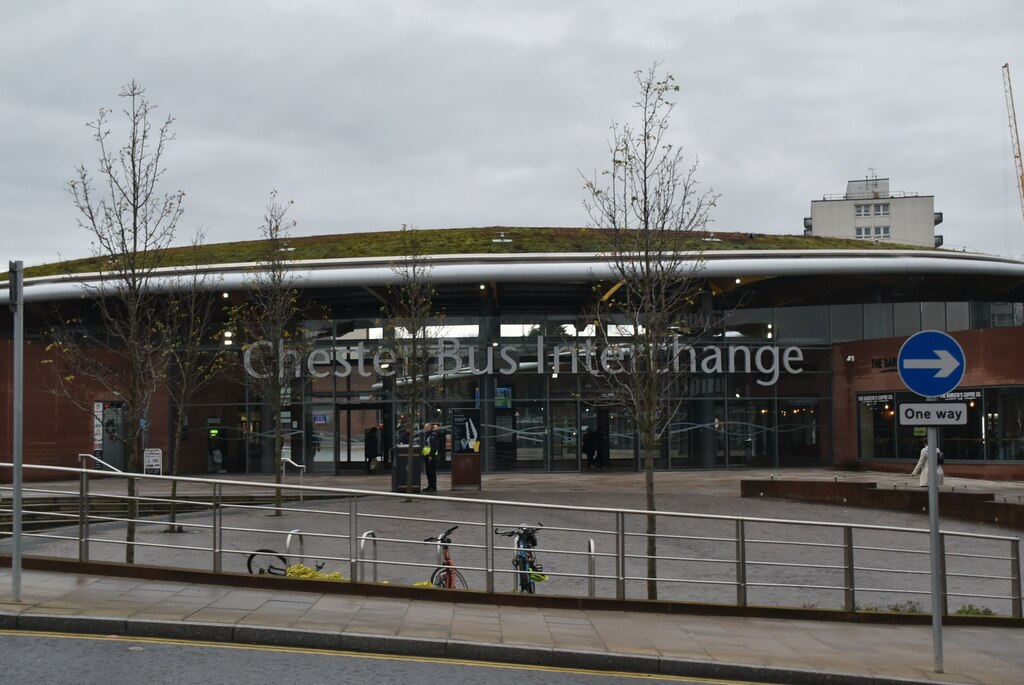
- Chester Bus Station during 2019.

General information
- Location: CH1 3EQ; Chester; England
- Coordinates: 53.1939493°N 2.8885118°W
- System: Bus station
- Owner: Cheshire West and Cheshire Council
- Bus routes: 72
- Bus stands: 13
- Bus operators: Stagecoach, Arriva, Warrington’s Own Bus Company, Al's Coaches, Aintree coachline, D&G, A2B Travel, M&H Coaches.
Location
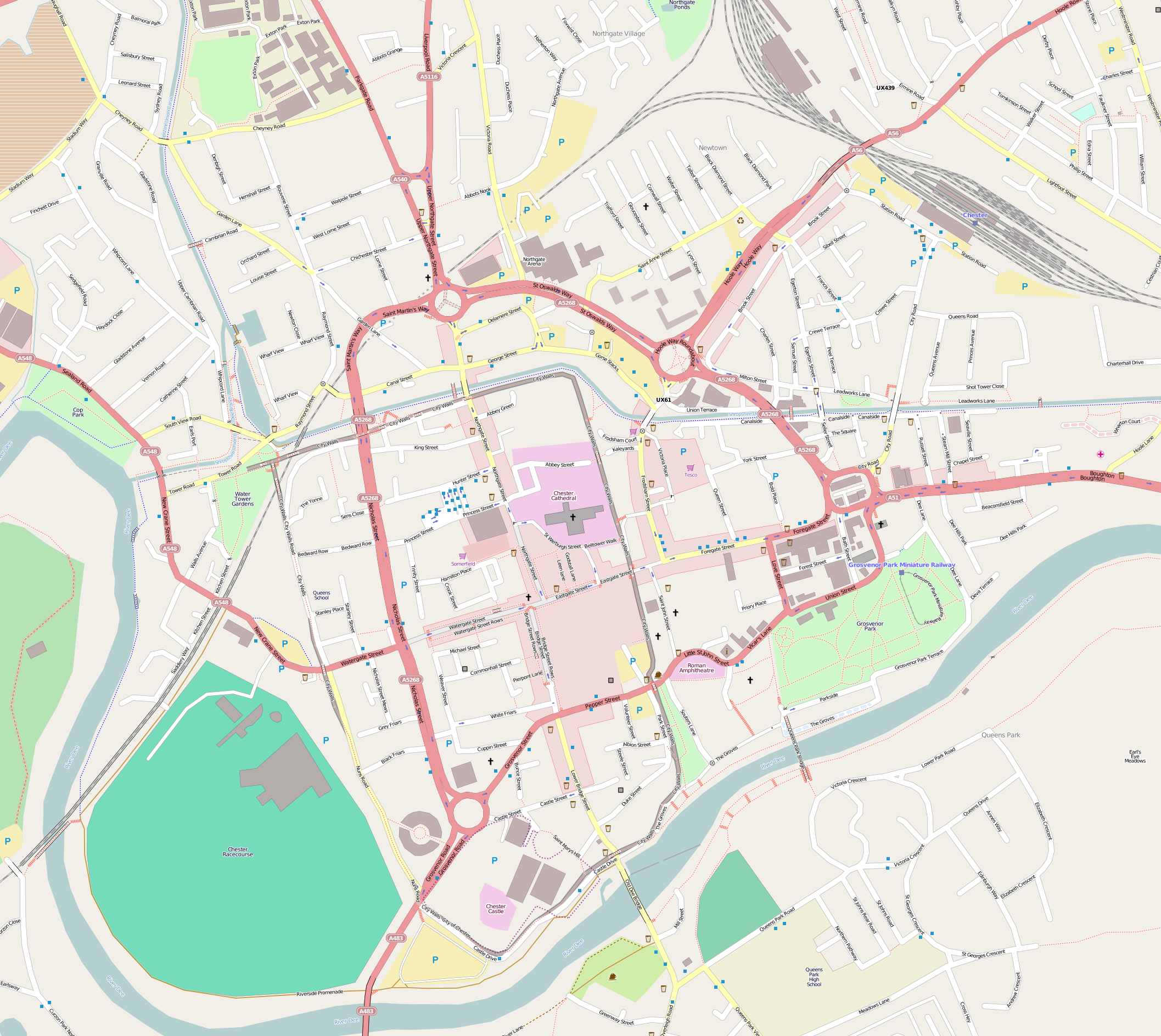
- Location within Chester city centre

Chester Bus Interchange is a bus station in Chester, England. It is situated at the Hoole Way roundabout.

== Operations ==
The bus station is situated at CH1 3EQ (George Street). The Station is owned and managed by Cheshire West and Cheshire Council.

The station has 72 routes running out of its 13 stands.

The bus operators running out of the bus station are Stagecoach, Arriva, Warrington's Own Bus Company, Al's Coaches, Aintree coachline, D&G, A2B Travel, M&H Coaches.

The majority of services are run by either Arriva or Stagecoach.

== History ==
The bus station was constructed to replace Princess Street bus station.

Work began in September 2015. The bus station was expected to open in early 2017, but was delayed. The first buses entered the facility during a test on 27 March 2017. The first passenger service to use the bus was Chester's park and ride service on 30 May 2017, and most other services began using the station on 5 June. A bus service, named Shopper Hopper, was introduced to link the current bus station to the site of the former Princess Street bus station.

== Facilities ==
The bus station has 13 stances, and is designed to handle 156 buses per hour. It was designed by Jefferson Sheard Architects. It has been noted for its exceptional accessibility. Features include a Changing Places toilet, a tactile map endorsed by the Royal National Institute of Blind People, and a dual-height customer service desk.
