= Arriva Buses Wales =

Bus operator in North Wales and Chester, England

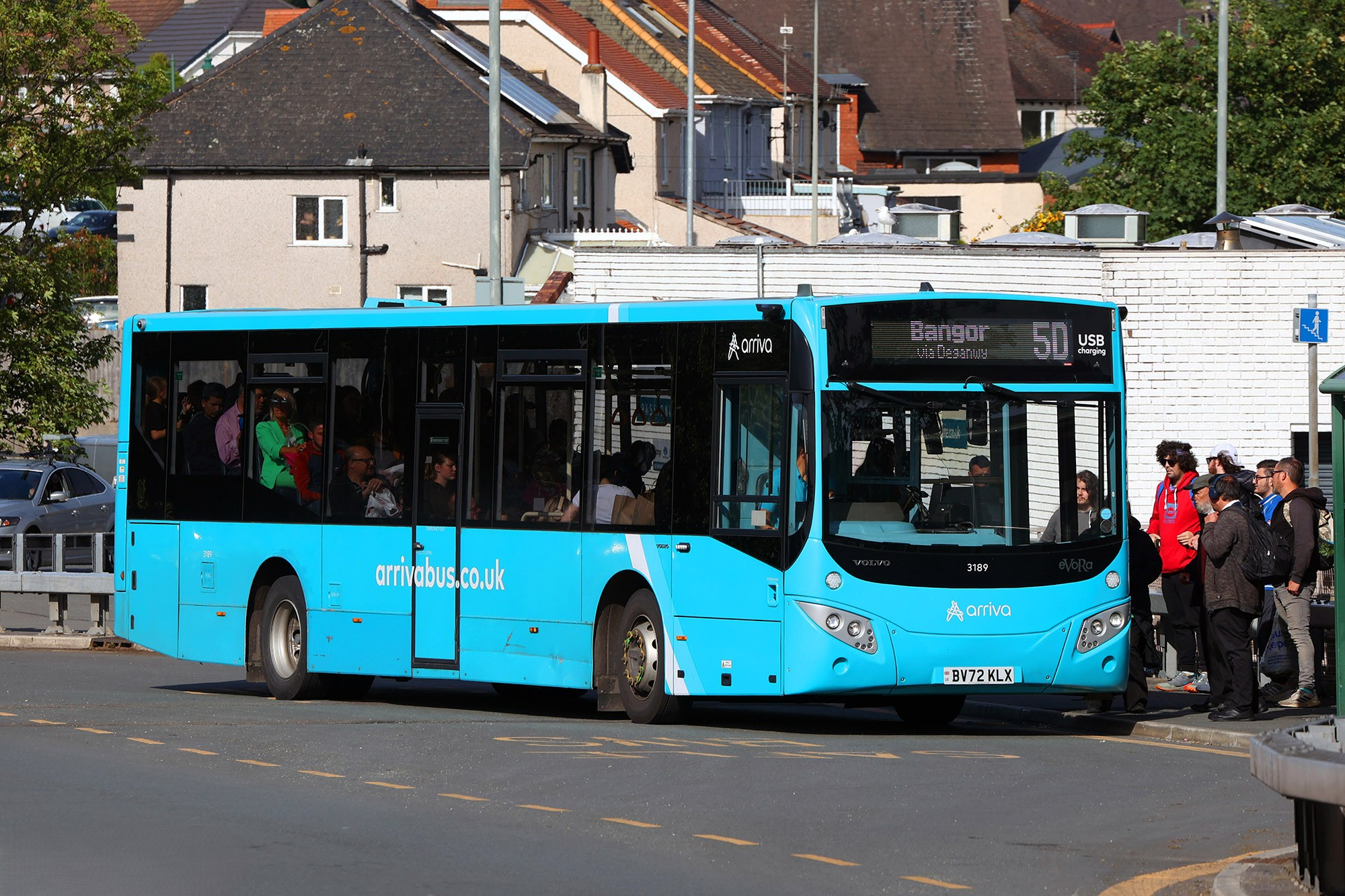
- MCV Evora bodied Volvo B8RLE in Llandudno Junction in May 2025
- Parent: Arriva UK Bus
- Founded: 1998; 28 years ago
- Headquarters: Bangor, Gwynedd, Wales
- Service area: Anglesey; Cheshire West and Chester; Conwy; Denbighshire; Flintshire; Gwynedd; Wrexham
- Service type: Bus and coach
- Depots: 4
- Fleet: 190 (July 2023)
- Commercial Director: Adam Marshall
- Website: www.arrivabus.co.uk/locations/wales

Arriva Buses Wales (Welsh: Bysiau Arriva Cymru) is a bus operator providing services in north Wales and in Cheshire West and Chester, England. It is a subsidiary of Arriva UK Bus.

== History ==
Crosville Motor Services was formed in 1919 and operated services in Wales and northern England. The company became a subsidiary of the National Bus Company in 1969, before its Welsh operations were split into Crosville Cymru ahead deregulation in preparation for sale in 1987 through a management buyout. In 1989, Crosville Cymru was sold to National Express, being sold again in 1991 to British Bus.

In August 1996 British Bus was purchased by the Cowie Group, and a year later in November 1997, Cowie rebranded to Arriva and adopted a corporate aquamarine and cream livery, with Crosville Cymru rebranding to Arriva Cymru. This operation continued until February 2002, when it merged with Arriva North West to form Arriva North West & Wales.

From 2004, Arriva Buses Wales competed with Llanberis independent operator KMP, with the latter purchasing new buses to compete on a service connecting Llandudno, Bangor, Caernarfon and Llangefni with cheaper fares. In August 2008, Arriva purchased routes 9 and 9A, serving Penmaenmawr and Llanfairfechan, and the seven buses used on the service from KMP for over £1 million (equivalent to £1,630,000 in 2025).

In January 2009, Arriva North West & Wales was split, reviving Arriva Buses Wales as an independent subsidiary. The revived company's operations were managed by a new management team based at Llandudno Junction depot.

From July 2016, several ex-GHA Coaches were taken on by Arriva Buses Wales after the former company went into administration. Former GHA Coaches routes SP1 and SP2, running between Ellesmere Port and Mold via Deeside Industrial Park and shared with Stagecoach South Wales, were ran for a week before Arriva pulled out from the routes.

== Services ==
Arriva Buses Wales operates services across the north of Wales from Holyhead to Wrexham, with some services crossing the English border into Chester. Until 2013, during the summer months, Arriva previously operated open top buses services in Rhyl.

=== Cymru Coastliner ===
'Cymru Coastliner' branded Wright StreetDeck Ultroliner at Chester Bus Interchange in September 2026

On 5 September 1965, Crosville Motor Services introduced the hourly 'Cymru Coastliner' express coach service between Chester and Caernarfon, anticipating that the Beeching cuts would cause the closure of the British Rail route and the intermediate stations serving both towns. This route was inherited by Crosville Cymru when the company was split in two, being extended at each end in 1989 to run from Wrexham to Holyhead and Portmadoc in 1989. Upon the company's rebranding in 1998, the 'Cymru Coastliner' brand was dropped.

Arriva revived the 'Cymru Coastliner' brand in February 2012 with the launch of eleven Wright Gemini 2DL double-decker buses on service 11 between Rhyl and Chester. An additional 'Cymru Coastliner'-branded service, running between Rhyl and Llandudno during the summer months using a fleet of Mercedes-Benz Tourismo coaches, was launched in June 2025. A fleet of Wright StreetDeck Ultroliners with revised 'Cymru Coastliner' branding were later launched on service 11 from September 2026.

=== Sapphire and Max ===
Sapphire branded Alexander Dennis Enviro400 in Chester in May 2013

Cross-border route 1 between Wrexham and Chester was selected as one of four Arriva services nationwide to pilot the new Arriva Sapphire luxury route brand in February 2013, with nine existing Alexander Dennis Enviro400s being refurbished to feature leather seats, on-board free WiFi and bilingual interior notices to launch the service the following April. Service 12/12X between Rhyl and Llandudno was upgraded to Sapphire specification in 2014, with service 10/10A between Connah's Quay and Chester following with the delivery of nine new Enviro400s in March 2015. In July 2017, 13 Sapphire-branded Alexander Dennis Enviro400 Citys were delivered to replace the refurbished Enviro400s on route 1.

Arriva's Max brand was introduced in 2015 with the introduction of single-deck buses refurbished to Max specification on service 51/51S between Rhyl and Denbigh.

Both brands have begun to be progressively phased out, with new Alexander Dennis Enviro200 MMC single-deck buses in standard livery introduced in August 2026 to replace the Enviro400 Citys on Sapphire service 1.

=== TrawsCambria and TrawsCymru ===
TrawsCambria-branded Optare Tempo at Cardiff Central bus station in August 2006

Arriva Buses Wales inherited a handful of TrawsCambria services, funded with the support of the Welsh Government, that were operated by Crosville Cymru. One of these, the X32 between Bangor and Aberystwyth, transitioned to be run on a purely commercial basis in 2012 before being withdrawn entirely in 2013 due to being financially unviable to run; the other, the X40 between Aberystwyth and Carmarthen, also transitioned to a commercial service branded CymruExpress when it was renumbered to route 40, however it too was withdrawn in December 2013 amid a number of service cuts in the Aberystwyth area.

Until Arriva decided to take on the route commercially, the X40 was originally supposed to be part of the relaunch of TrawsCambria as TrawsCymru, where it would have been replaced with route TC1. The later withdrawal of the CymruExpress X40 permitted the launch of such a service under the TrawsCymru banner.

On 29 September 2025, Arriva commenced operations on the new T51 service between Rhyl and Wrexham as part of TrawsCymru's Network North Wales, currently the company's sole operation on the network. After temporarily making use of loan vehicles, the service is operated using a fleet of eight Wright StreetDeck Ultroliners branded in TrawsCymru livery.

== Fleet and depots ==
Arriva's Rhyl bus depot in October 2019

As of July 2023, Arriva Buses Wales operates a fleet of 190 buses from four depots:

- Bangor - Llandygai Industrial Estate, Llandygai (headquarters)
- Hawarden (near Chester) - Manor Lane Industrial Estate, Manor Lane
- Rhyl - Ffynnongroew Road
- Wrexham - Berse Road, Caego

There are also smaller outstations or sub-depots at other locations, including Llandudno, Holyhead, and Amlwch, which are outstations of Bangor.

The former regional headquarters and depot at Llandudno Junction closed in April 2013. Aberystwyth depot, along with its outstations at New Quay and Lampeter closed on 21 December 2013, along with Dolgellau, latterly an outstation of Wrexham depot. Councillors and AMs criticised the short notice given by Arriva, leading to fears that communities could be left without bus services; however, other operators took over the running of the routes.

A new Bangor depot opened on the Llandygai Industrial Estate in February 2006, replacing an original Crosville depot in Bangor town centre that dated back to 1931, and a new Rhyl depot, featuring solar-powered LED lighting, large skylights and a bus wash with a water recycling system was opened on 2 March 2017, replacing a site formerly occupied by the Rhyl Miniature Railway.
