= TrawsCymru =

Regional bus network in Wales

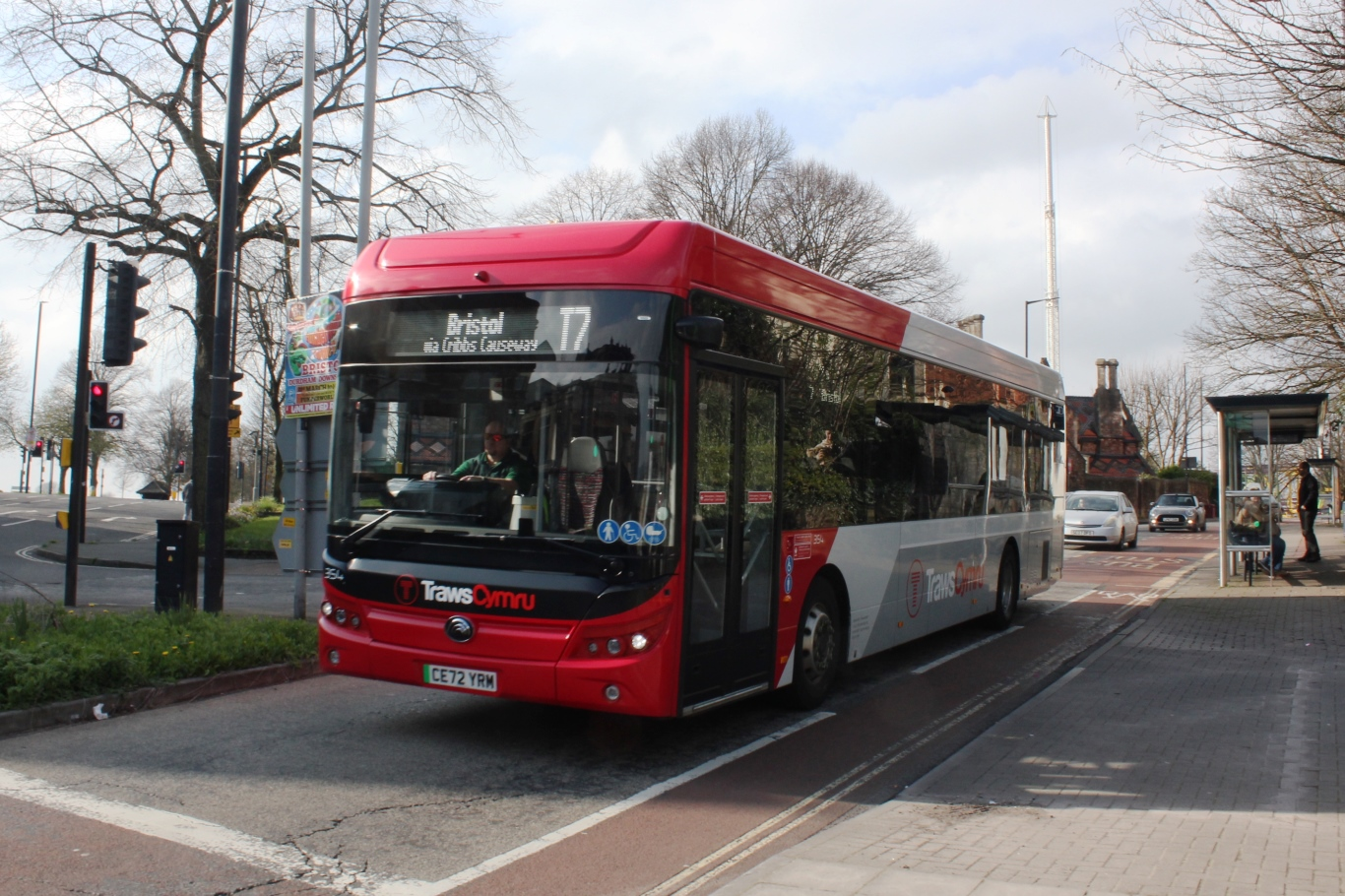
- Parent: Transport for Wales
- Commenced operation: 24 September 2012; 14 years ago
- Service area: Wales
- Service type: Long-distance bus services
- Routes: 16
- Fuel type: Diesel and electric
- Operator: Arriva Buses Wales; Adventure Travel; Celtic Travel; First Cymru; K&P Coaches; Lloyds Coaches; Llew Jones; M&H Coaches; Mid Wales Travel; Newport Bus; Richards Brothers; Williams Coaches
- Website: www.traws.cymru

TrawsCymru (Welsh for 'across Wales') is a network of regional long-distance bus services in Wales. The brand was introduced by the Welsh Government to improve cross-country public transport links and to replace the earlier TrawsCambria network. Services operate on key strategic routes, with the network now managed by Transport for Wales.

== Operations ==
TrawsCymru routes operate over longer distances than conventional local bus services, linking key settlements and providing connections where rail routes are limited or indirect. Services typically connect with local bus networks and railway stations. The network aims to support economic development, improve accessibility, and encourage sustainable travel across Wales.

== History ==
=== Launch plans ===
In 2010, the Welsh Government ran a consultation on improvements to the existing TrawsCambria network. In 2011, a programme of improvements for TrawsCambria services X40 (Carmarthen - Pencader - Lampeter - Aberaeron - Aberystwyth) and 704/T4 (Newtown - Brecon/Merthyr) was announced.

Under these plans services the X40 and T4 services, and the network as a whole, were to be re-launched under the new TrawsCymru brand. Service X40 was to be re-numbered TC1 and T4 would have become TC4, along with extension south to Cardiff. During 2012, these two routes were to receive new Optare Tempos equipped with coach style seating, greater luggage space, real time information and WiFi.

The plans for re-numbering T4 were dropped, but the new vehicles and extension to Cardiff were introduced. The six additional WAG-funded Optare Tempos with leather seats, free WiFi and tables operate alongside the existing three Optare Tempos that had previously worked the T4 service.

The X40 was originally scheduled to be replaced by TrawsCymru service T1/TC1 from 1 April 2012 under a contract until 31 March 2020 on offer. However it later emerged that Arriva Buses Wales intended to stop operating the X40 service, along with its share of route 550, from 26 February. Instead Arriva introduced services branded Cymru Express on a fully commercial basis in place of the former TrawsCambria X40.

=== Change of plan ===
Because of the commercial CymruExpress, the TC1 TrawsCymru service could not be introduced. The six new buses that had been ordered to operate the TC1 were thus placed into store. These were longer than the new vehicles for the TC4, so were later taken out of storage and put to use on the T4 service, to increase capacity. They replaced three of the vehicles that had been ordered for the TC4, which joined the remaining three unused vehicles which had been intended for the TC1 in store. In August 2013, the Welsh Government launched an express bus service between Cardiff Central station and Cardiff Airport. This was branded as a TrawsCymru route, given the number T9.

Arriva's CymruExpress services ceased on 21 December 2013, meaning a TrawsCymru service between Aberystwyth and Carmarthen was once again a possibility. Interim contracts to continue bus services on the route were let pending the introduction of a TrawsCymru service.

=== Review ===
In July 2013, it emerged that Welsh Transport Minister, Edwina Hart, had commissioned a review of the TrawsCymru network. This was to be undertaken by Director of the Bevan Foundation, Dr Victoria Winckler.

This outcome of this review was published by in February 2014, defining the purpose of TrawsCymru as a network of medium-to-long-distance (defined as 25 miles or more), strategically important bus services that connect key towns in Wales – complementing the rail network.

The report's recommendations included:

- TrawsCymru requires a strategic, all-Wales, approach. Currently, TrawsCymru contracts are let by four different local authorities and this approach was considered too fragmented.
- That the implementation of any new corridors should be based on robust business plans which demonstrate demand and provide for a package of measures to improve the passenger journey.
- TrawsCymru should complement the rail network and not seek to compete with rail services. Where justified by demand, it should provide good connections to onward rail services, but it should not be driven by or secondary to the rail network.
- Service quality provision:
  - TrawsCymru services should serve intermediate bus stops as well as main towns, but should avoid detours.
  - The impact of intermediate stops/detours should increase the journey duration by no more than 50% longer than by car, and ideally less (around 33% being preferable).
  - TrawsCymru should promote and accept CymruConnect (rail and bus combined) through-tickets, and action should be taken to improve the profile and performance of CymruConnect.
  - TrawsCymru services need to address passenger facilities at bus stations and passenger information, which are part of responding to passenger needs.
- Focus of effort in the short term should be on completing the rebrand of the five core TrawsCymru routes (T1 to T5) from TrawsCambria, rather than expansion of the TrawsCymru network to new routes
- The TrawsCymru strategic board should focus on strategic issues with corridor delivery groups dealing with operational matters, on a formal basis. Both groups should have strengthened user representation.

=== 2014 and 2015 launches ===
During 2014, the rollout of the TrawsCymru brand to the other TrawsCambria corridors began. The first route to appear was the Carmarthen-Aberystwyth route, but the original plan for the service to become known as TC1 has been dropped. The TrawsCymru service was instead launched under the service number T1, in August 2014. Unlike the T4 and T9 TrawsCymru contracts, the operator provides vehicles for the T1, rather than using vehicles owned by the Welsh Government. It remains to be seen how the vehicles used will compare to the Welsh Government owned ones on the other routes.

Invitations To Tender were also published for the remaining three TrawsCambria routes X50 (Aberystwyth-Cardigan), T2 (Bangor-Aberystwyth) and X94 (Wrexham-Barmouth), to be known as T5, T2 and T3 respectively. The X94 became the T3 in November 2014, and the X50 the T5 in January 2015. The T2 contract was expected to start in 2014, but due to last minute registrations of commercial workings by the incumbent operators ended up being let as a short term extension without TrawsCymru branding. In November 2015, the T2 was finally launched with branded buses in due course. Lloyds Coaches have ordered three Optare MetroCitys with the first two due in January 2016 and the third due in March 2016.

=== TaithCymru coach service ===
Plaid Cymru in its 2026 Senedd manifesto and its 100 day plan promised that it would create an express coach service between North and South Wales. On 30 June 2026, the new Plaid Cymru-led ap Iorwerth Welsh Government announced that a new coach service would be launched between Carmarthen and Bangor, it will reduce public transport journey time by over an hour. It was latter revealed that the coach will be called 'TaithCymru' and daily services would start from 25 October 2026. Eight coaches have been bought for the services and TaithCymru coaches will call at other towns including; Caernarfon, Porthmadog, Dolgellau, Machynlleth, Aberystwyth University, Aberystwyth and Aberaeron. The Welsh Government has provided £2 million for the first year of the service.

== Routes ==
Route number	Start point	via	End point	Operator	Vehicles
T1	Aberystwyth	Aberaeron, Lampeter, Pencader, Carmarthenshire	Carmarthen	First Cymru	Yutong E12
T1A	Aberystwyth	Tregaron, Lampeter, Pencader	Carmarthen	First Cymru	Yutong E12
T1C	Aberystwyth	Aberaeron, Llandysul, Carmarthen, Bridgend Designer Outlet, Cardiff Bay	Cardiff	Mid Wales Travel	Mercedes-Benz Tourismo
T1X	Aberystwyth	Aberaeron, Llandysul, Pencader	Carmarthen	First Cymru	Yutong E12
T2	Bangor, Gwynedd	Caernarfon, Porthmadog, Dolgellau, Machynlleth	Aberystwyth	Lloyds Coaches	Wright StreetDeck Ultroliner
T3 & T3C	Barmouth	Dolgellau, Bala, Corwen, Llangollen	Wrexham	Lloyds Coaches	MCV Evora
T4	Newtown, Powys	Llandrindod Wells, Builth Wells, Brecon	Merthyr Tydfil	Celtic Travel & Williams Coaches	MCV Evora
T5	Aberystwyth	Aberaeron, Cardigan, Newport, Fishguard	Haverfordwest	Richards Brothers	MCV Evora
T6	Brecon	Ystradgynlais, Neath	Swansea	Adventure Travel (bus company)	MCV Evora
T7	Chepstow	Cribbs Causeway	Bristol	Newport Bus	Yutong E12
T8	Chester	Mold, Ruthin	Corwen	M&H Coaches	MCV Evora
T10	Bangor	Bethesda, Betws-y-Coed, Cerrigydrudion	Corwen	K&P Coaches	MCV Evora
T11	Fishguard	Goodwick, St Davids	Haverfordwest	Richards Brothers	MCV Evora
T22	Caernarfon	Penygroes, Porthmadog	Blaenau Ffestiniog	Llew Jones Coaches	Yutong E12
T51	Rhyl	St Asaph, Denbigh, Ruthin	Wrexham	Arriva Buses Wales	Wright StreetDeck Ultroliner
TaithCymru	Carmarthen	Aberaeron, Aberystwyth, Aberystwyth University, Machynlleth, Dolgellau, Porthmadog and Caernarfon.	Bangor (Note: Also continues to Holyhead railway station and port once every evening.)	Edwards Coaches and Llew Jones Coaches	MCV EvoTor

=== Former services ===
Route number	Start point	via	End point	Operator	End date
T1S	Carmarthen	Cross Hands	Swansea	First Cymru	Service Suspended due to Lockdown, 2020
T9	Cardiff		Cardiff Airport	Adventure Travel (bus company)	Service Suspended due to Lockdown, 2020
T12	Machynlleth	Newtown, Welshpool, Oswestry	Wrexham	Lloyds Coaches & Tanat Valley Coaches	Service Ceased on 30/08/2025 due to retendering of Powys Bus Network
T14	Hereford	Hay-on-Wye, Brecon, Merthyr Tydfil, Pontypridd	Cardiff	Stagecoach South Wales	Service Ceased on 30/08/2025 due to retendering of Powys Bus Network
T19	Llandudno	Llanrwst, Betws-y-Coed	Blaenau Ffestiniog	Llew Jones Coaches	Service Cancelled 11/02/2023

=== T1, T1A, T1C and T1X ===
T1, T1A, T1C and T1X
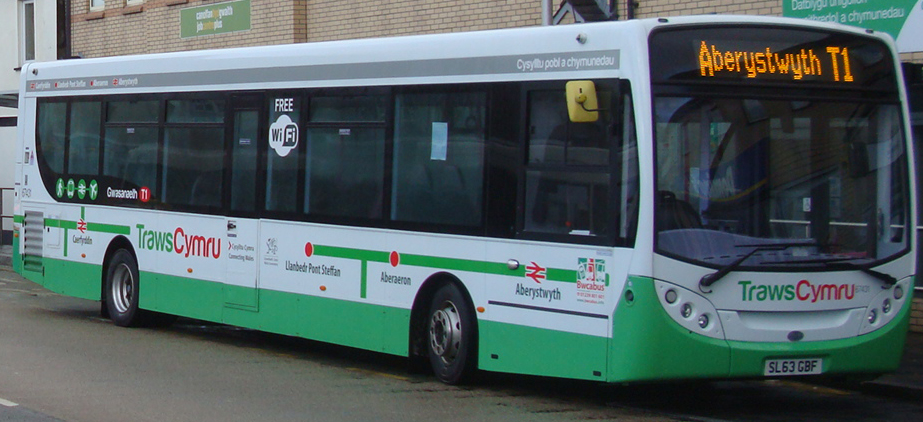

Overview
- Operator: First Cymru (T1, T1A, T1X); Mid Wales Travel (T1C)
- Garage: Carmarthen
- Vehicle: Yutong E12 (T1, T1A, T1X); Mercedes-Benz Tourismo (T1C)

Route
- Start: Aberystwyth
- End: Carmarthen (T1, T1A, T1X); Cardiff (T1C)

Service
- Operates: Daily

The T1 service commenced operating on 4 August 2014. An hourly service is provided Monday to Saturday with a few Sunday journeys. A late evening working also operates, between Aberystwyth and Lampeter. A single service number is used, but buses take two different routes between Pencader and Lampeter in order to serve intermediate villages every two hours (prior to the T1 launch, one village had an hourly bus service and the other nothing).

The T1 is operated by First Cymru using eight Yutong E12 battery electric buses launched for the service in TrawsCymru livery in March 2023; many duties were subcontracted to Mid Wales Travel drivers.

Journey time for the T1 was 2 hours 15 minutes. According to Dr Winckler's review, the journey time by car is 1 hour 25 minutes, meaning the bus service takes 58% longer than driving and hence misses the target set by the review.

From 5 December 2016 to 14 April 2018, First Cymru operated the T1C service using the T1 fleet, which was then a once per day (except Sundays) extension of the T1 to Swansea and Cardiff, introduced as a replacement for the more frequent 701 service which had ceased operating in August 2016 when its final operator, Lewis Coaches, ceased trading.

On the 16 April 2018, NAT Group took over operation of the T1C service. Though still once per day, the use of a separate Aberystwyth to Cardiff service by coach and Sunday operation both resumed, neither of which had been seen since the 701.

On the 21st of March 2023 it was announced that NAT Group had lost the contract to Mid Wales Travel with them taking over on the 1st of April and not long after in September Mid Wales Travel had one of their coaches (a Volvo B8R Plaxton Panther 3 number 122 YX22 LWA) liveried up into the TrawsCymru livery to be the dedicated T1C coach. In 2025 Mid Wales Travel upgraded the T1C by buying a new Coach (a 3rd gen Mercedes-Benz Tourismo BJ75 NYA) which resulted in the cascading of the Plaxton Panther 3 onto other routes operated by Mid Wales Travel. The T1C as operated by Mid Wales Travel takes advantage of being a separate service to the T1 by bypassing Lampeter, Llanybydder, and from Monday to Saturday, Swansea, taking an hour off the full journey time which is now 3 hours 35 minutes.

The T1S service also commenced operation by First Cymru on 16 April 2018 using the T1 fleet. The T1S provides connections at Carmarthen for passengers travelling between Aberystwyth and Swansea on Monday to Saturday, has an approximate full journey time of 1 hour and additionally serves the National Botanic Garden of Wales once per day in either direction.

=== T2 ===
T2

Overview
- Operator: Lloyds Coaches
- Vehicle: Optare MetroCity
- Predecessors: X32

Route
- Start: Bangor
- Via: Caernarfon; Porthmadog; Dolgellau; Machynlleth
- End: Aberystwyth

Service
- Level: Daily
- Journey time: 3 hours 15 minutes

The T2 service is operated by Lloyds Coaches (formerly Lloyds Coaches and Express Motors until the latter's closure in January 2018) and runs twice a day from Bangor to Aberystwyth, with additional workings over part of the route on Mondays to Saturdays. This service was introduced towards the end of September 2012, when Arriva Buses Wales cancelled TrawsCambria service X32. Lloyds Coaches used buses in their own standard liveries. In March 2016, the service was upgraded with four TrawsCymru branded Optare MetroCitys.

=== T3 ===
T3

Overview
- Operator: Lloyds Coaches
- Vehicle: MCV Evora
- Predecessors: X94

Route
- Start: Wrexham
- Via: Llangollen; Corwen; Bala; Dolgellau
- End: Barmouth

Service
- Level: Monday-Saturday
- Journey time: 2 hours 30 minutes

The T3 service commenced operating on 2 November 2014. A more frequent Monday to Saturday service is provided compared to the previous TrawsCambria service X94 it replaces along with improved connections with the T2 service in Dolgellau. GHA Coaches were awarded a seven-year contract to operate the service, initially with existing buses (one single deck Scania OmniCity of which was TrawsCymru liveried) before taking delivery of three Alexander Dennis Enviro400 bodied Scania N230UDs and an Alexander Dennis Enviro200, all fitted with Wi-Fi and leather seats in 2015. Journey time is 2 hours 30 minutes. Following the collapse of GHA Coaches in July 2016, the service was immediately taken over by Lloyds Coaches.

Initially, Lloyds Coaches entirely used vehicles they already owned, before acquiring all three of the Scania-ADL Enviro400s, but not the OmniCity nor the ADL Enviro200, the latter of which went to NAT Group as one of the T6 vehicles, so a different Enviro200 was used in its place. As of July 2017 that Enviro200 has been replaced with two brand new Optare MetroCitys.

=== T4 and T14 ===
T4 & T14
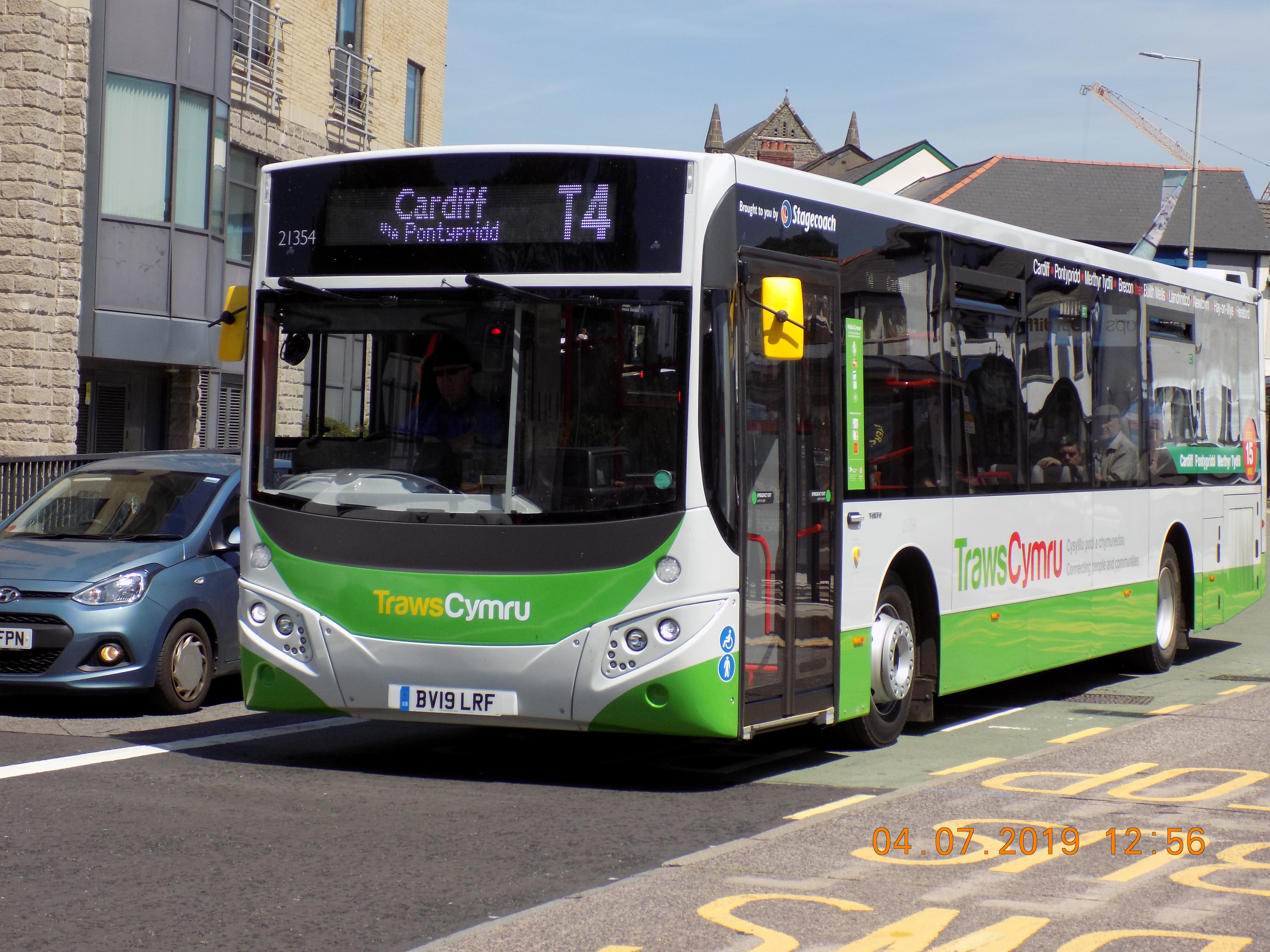

Overview
- Operator: Stagecoach South Wales
- Vehicle: Volvo B8RLE/MCV Evora
- Predecessors: 39, 704

Route
- Start: Newtown (T4); Hereford (T14)
- Via: Llandrindod Wells; Builth Wells; Brecon; Hay-on-Wye (T14); Merthyr Tydfil; Pontypridd
- End: Cardiff

Service
- Level: Daily

The T4 was the first TrawsCymru service to be launched on 31 May 2011 and is operated by Stagecoach South Wales, who also operated the previous TrawsCambria 704 (which operated between Newtown and Brecon only).

The service as launched was operated with nine Optare Tempos, branded TrawsCymru, three of which had been ordered and used on the 704 and were repainted into TrawsCymru livery. The other six were new vehicles introduced to extend the service to Cardiff. The new vehicles were to an enhanced standard with a new design of seat and WiFi.

The three aging former TrawsCambria Optare Tempos were finally retired in May to June 2017 after more than a decade of service, and replaced with three transferred two-year-old Alexander Dennis Enviro300 bodied Scania K230UBs.

The T14 service (Cardiff to Hereford via Merthyr Tydfil, Brecon and Hay-on-Wye) commenced operating on 2 September 2018.

In July 2019, 12 MCV Evoras were introduced for use on both the T4 and the T14 replacing the remaining Tempos and Enviro300s.

The service is the longest end-to-end journey on the TrawsCymru network, with a journey time of 3 hours 50 minutes.

=== T5 ===
T5
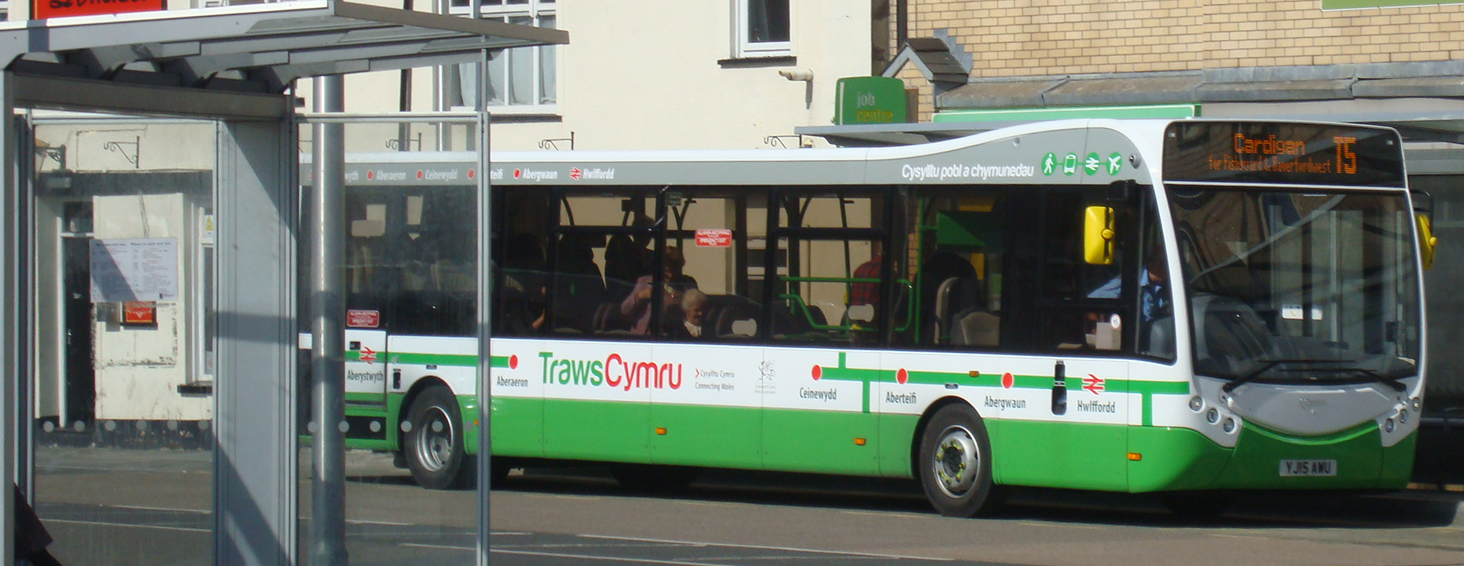

Overview
- Operator: Richards Brothers
- Vehicles: Optare MetroCity
- Predecessors: 412, 550 & X50

Route
- Start: Aberystwyth
- Via: Aberaeron; New Quay; Cardigan; Fishguard
- End: Haverfordwest

Service
- Level: Monday–Saturday

The T5 was commenced on 5 January 2015. Roughly hourly departures are provided from Aberystwyth, Cardigan, Fishguard and Haverfordwest but the service is made up of a number of different routes, the most frequent being:

- Aberystwyth - New Quay - Cardigan - Fishguard - Mathry Road - Haverfordwest and
- Aberystwyth - New Quay - Aberporth - Cardigan - Fishguard - Mathry Road - Haverfordwest (between Cardigan and Aberystwyth, this was formerly known as TrawsCambria service 550)

Additionally:

- One trip in each direction does not travel via New Quay (the northbound service is a short working, starting from Cardigan)
- Several short-workings between Haverfordwest and Cardigan/Newport do not travel via Mathry Road
- Some journeys operate via Goodwick and/or Trecwn

Shortly before the service launched, the TrawsCymru website was updated to include the service, with the report: "The TrawsCymru T5 provides a regular and direct service along the scenic Cambrian Coast, linking Aberystwyth, Aberaeron, New Quay, Cardigan, Fishguard and Haverfordwest." This is inaccurate because not all journeys serve New Quay and the inclusion of Fishguard and (on some trips) New Quay and Aberporth means the service is by no means direct. The website also reported that the service operates 7 days per week, when in fact there are no services between 03:00 on Sundays and 05:45 on Mondays (effectively no Sunday service). By 8 January 2015, this latter error had been corrected to say that the service operates 6 days per week.

The service was initially operated with existing buses, including four former TrawsCambria Optare Tempos, and four VDL SB200s (two with Wright Pulsar 2 bodies, one with an old-style Wright Pulsar body and one with an MCV Evolution body registered as YJ14CCV, which is a one-off, as it is an ex-demonstrator that only received orders on other chassis). All of these vehicles received TrawsCymru livery and seating, and in 2015 were joined by four new Optare MetroCitys. While the Tempos remain on the service, the fact that they are ageing former TrawsCambria examples (same as the older T4 ones withdrawn in 2017) as opposed to the newer ones used on the T4 and T9, means that the MetroCitys and SB200s are somewhat prioritised. The new MCV Evora bodied Volvo B8RLEs received for the T11 have been known to operate the T5.

=== T6 ===
T6

Overview
- Operator: Adventure Travel
- Vehicles: Alexander Dennis Enviro200 Optare MetroCity Volvo B8RLE/MCV Evora
- Predecessors: X63 & X64

Route
- Start: Brecon
- Via: Ystradgynlais; Neath
- End: Swansea

Service
- Level: Daily
- Frequency: Hourly

The T6 was previously known as the services X63 & X64 and was renumbered and added to the TrawsCymru network in 2015. The service starts in Swansea and runs via Swansea University Bay Campus, Neath, Aberdulais Falls, Ystradgynlais and Abercrave, Dan Yr Ogof Show Caves and then terminates in Brecon.

The T6 runs seven days a week, hourly Monday to Saturday with five journeys in each direction on Sundays and bank holidays.

Since 2015, the service has been run by New Adventure Travel from Swansea depot, using Optare MetroCity, Alexander Dennis Enviro 200 and MCV Evora, being painted in TrawsCymru livery for the Service.

In early 2021, the service was upgraded to newer Optare MetroCity, painted in the New 2021 TrawsCymru livery for the T6 service. These buses were originally intended for use for T9 Service, but the service was suspended in 2020 due to Covid-19. This route takes 1 hour 49 minutes

In August 2026, the 4 Optare MetroCity buses that were in the TrawsCymru livery have been acquired by Adventure Travel and all of them (OM162-OM165) have been repainted into their Adventure Travel Purple Skirt livery, and these buses have been replaced by 4 MCV Evora shelled Volvo B8RLE buses which originally ran on the T2 service.

=== T7 ===
T7 TrawsHafren
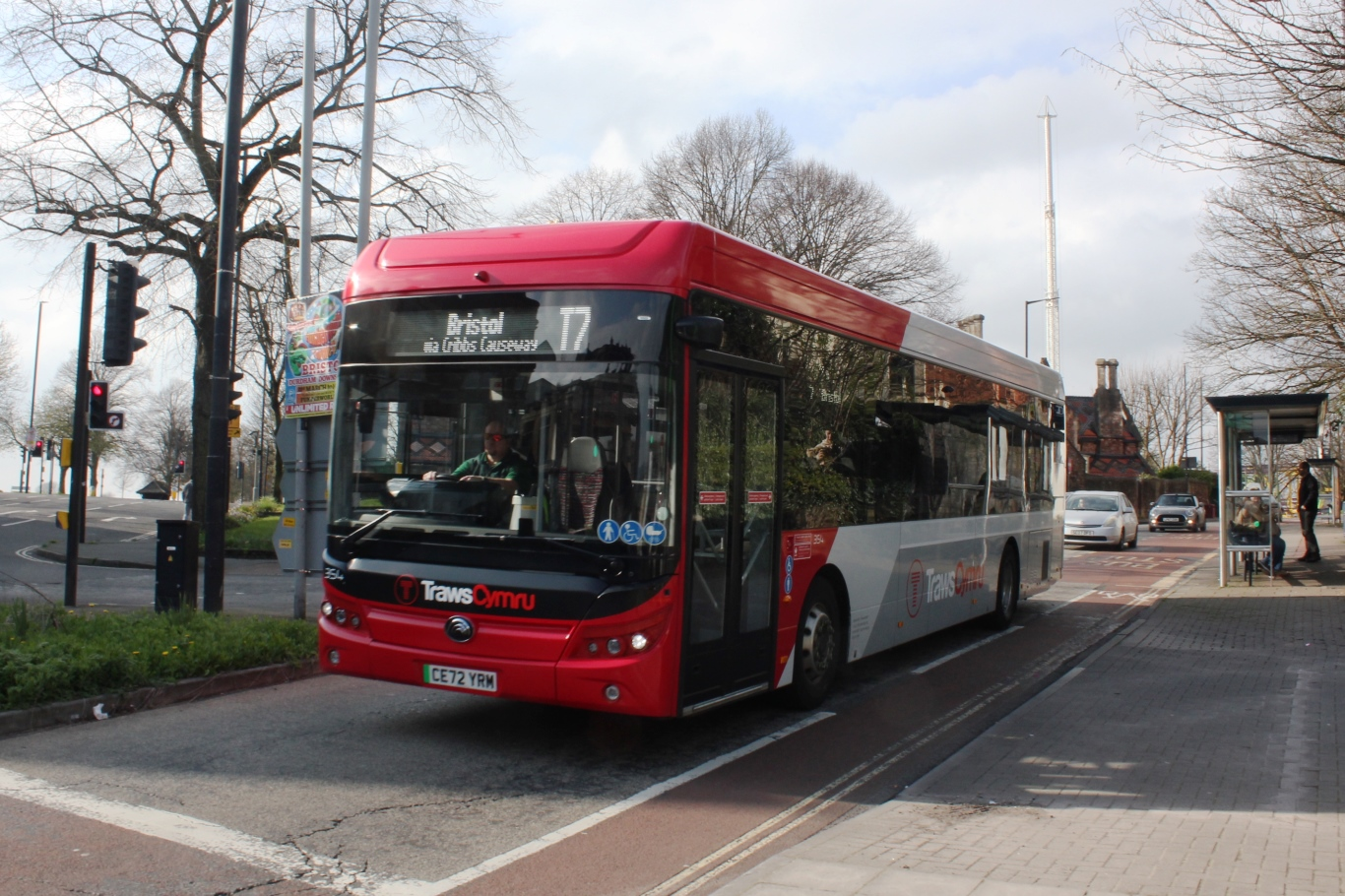

Overview
- Operator: Newport Bus
- Vehicle: Yutong E12
- Predecessors: X7, X14 & Severn Express

Route
- Start: Bristol
- Via: Clifton; Cribbs Causeway; Bulwark
- End: Chepstow

Service
- Level: Daily
- Frequency: Hourly (Monday to Saturday); 4 journeys (Sunday & Bank Holiday)

In April 2020, Stagecoach West announced it would cease to operate the Severn Express and X14 routes on 13 June. On 10 June 2020, NAT Group announced that it would continue the Severn Express route working in partnership with Monmouthshire County Council and TrawsCymru. The route was operated on a 6 month trial basis until 31 December 2020.
Newport Bus took over the route on 4 January 2021 and route was renumbered from X7 to T7. Newport Bus operated the route using two MCV Evoras previously operated by Stagecoach South Wales on their T4/T14 TrawsCymru routes; these were replaced by two new Yutong E12s in early 2023.

=== T9 ===
T9
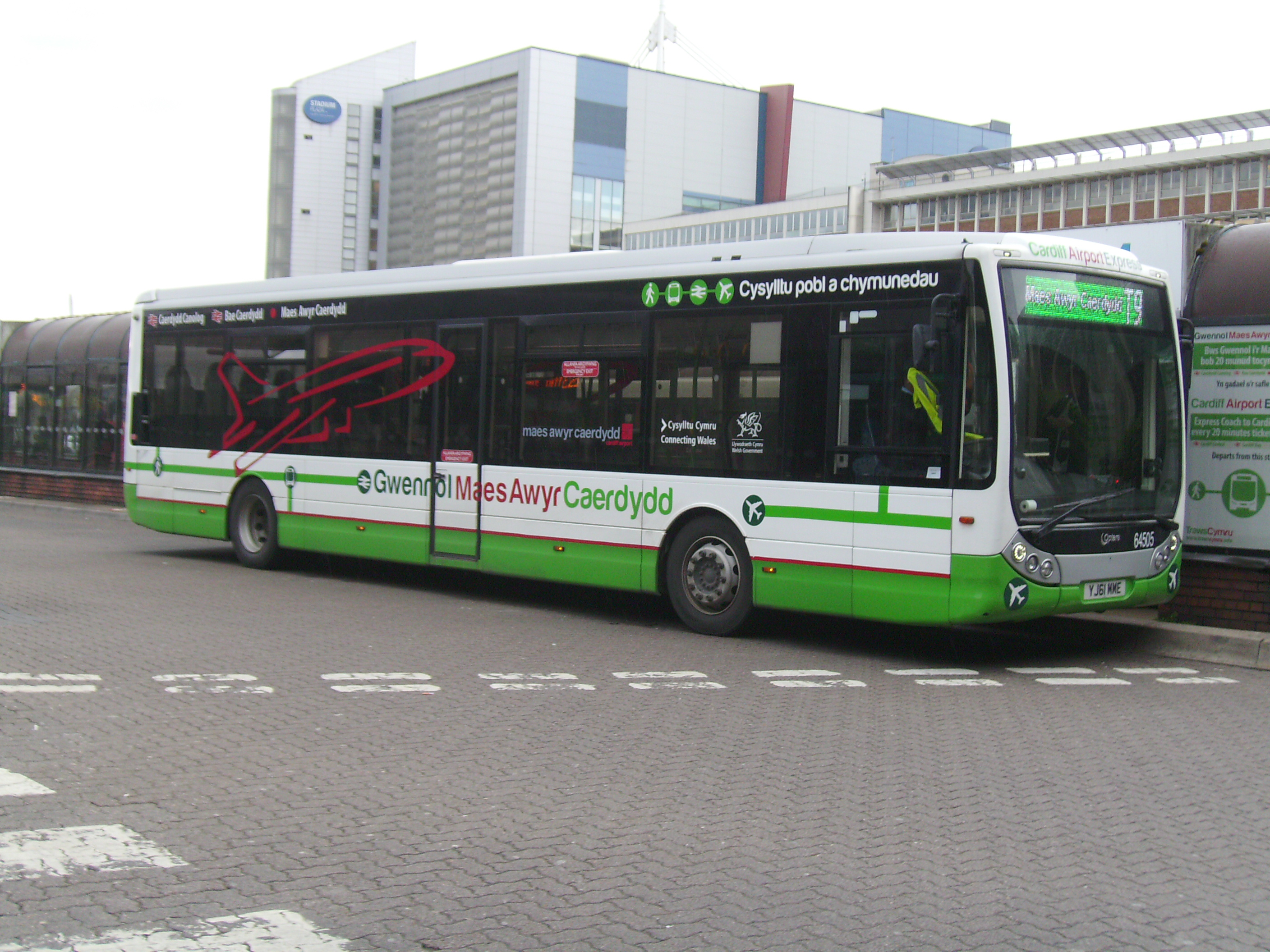

Overview
- Operator: New Adventure Travel
- Vehicle: Optare Tempo

Route
- Start: Cardiff Airport
- Via: Cardiff Bay
- End: Cardiff Central

Service
- Level: Daily
- Frequency: 20 minutes (summer), 30 minutes (winter)
- Journey time: 40 minutes

The T9 service commenced operating on 1 August 2013. It was initially operated by First Cymru and ran every 20 minutes, 7 days a week. Five Optare Tempos are allocated to the service. The buses used were reported to be those ordered for the Carmarthen - Aberystwyth TC1 service. On 1 November 2014 New Adventure Travel took over operation of the route, which was reduced to a half-hourly. It was restored to a 20 minutes frequency in April 2015. It was suspended during the COVID-19 pandemic due to the suspension of passenger services at Cardiff Airport.

Initially the Welsh Government refused to accept concessionary passes on the route, but this was later reversed.

At around 15 miles, the route falls some way short of the 25 mile minimum distance given in the 2018 Winckler review of TrawsCymru. The journey time from Cardiff Airport to Cardiff Central was 40 minutes. Due to the circular route via Cardiff Bay, the journey from Cardiff Central to the airport was only 30 minutes.

=== TrawsCymru Cyswllt ===
A number of shorter services are designated as TrawsCymru 'Cyswllt' ('connect').

These were initially not mentioned on the TrawsCymru website and the vehicles used did carry any special livery or branding, until late 2017 when Richards Bros' Optare Versa and their brand new Enviro200 received the Cyswllt livery.

From 2019 the services now appear on TrawsCymru literature. The present routes include:

- T8 (Corwen-Chester)
- T11 (Fishguard-Haverfordwest)
- T12 (Machynlleth-Newtown-Wrexham)
- 460 (Cardigan-Carmarthen)
- X43 (Brecon-Abergavenny)
