= Richards Brothers =

Welsh bus operator based in Cardigan

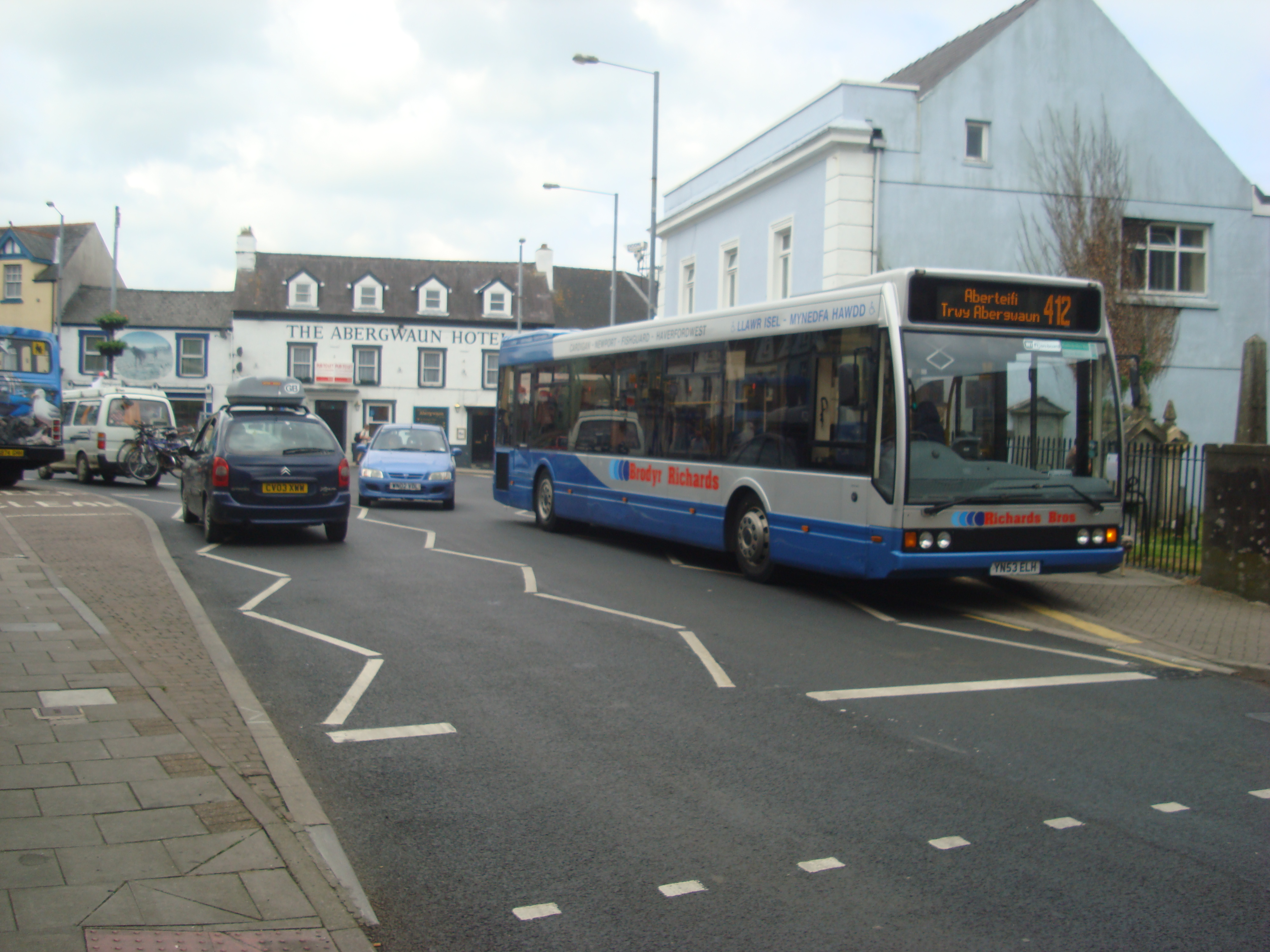
- Optare Excel in Fishguard in June 2012
- Parent: Marteine, Malcolm & Nigel Richards
- Founded: May 1943
- Headquarters: Cardigan
- Service area: Cardigan; Fishguard
- Service type: Bus and coach services
- Alliance: TrawsCymru
- Routes: 40
- Depots: 3
- Fleet: 65
- Website: www.richardsbros.co.uk

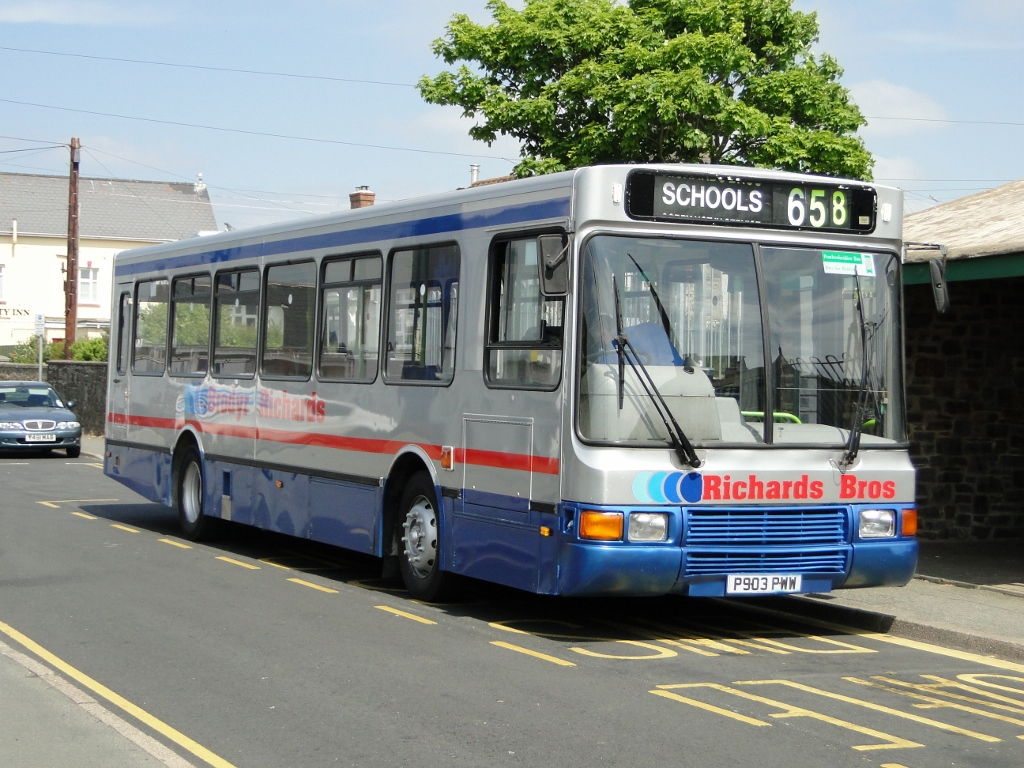
Northern Counties Paladin bodied DAF SB220 in Pembrokeshire in June 2013

Richards Bros Buses (Welsh: Brodyr Richards) is a bus operator based in Cardigan, Wales. It has purchased many smaller bus companies over time, and currently has 65 vehicles running local bus services and school buses in south-west Wales (primarily Ceredigion and Pembrokeshire, with some Carmarthenshire services), as well as coach tours. Richards Bros also operates a share of the new demand-responsive Bwcabus service.

== History ==
William Goronwy Richards started carrying passengers in the late 1930s however Richards Brothers was established in May 1943 by William Richards, when his children Idris and Reggie were introduced to the company.

The first buses run by Richards were mostly Bedfords, the first being a converted Bedford WS, registered ALP 674 purchased in 1937. A second-hand Bedford WHB followed in July 1941.The first bought new (in 1943) was a Bedford OWB, manufactured with wooden seats to fit the war years, and the first operations base was a small site in Moylgrove.

Originally, Richards were contracted by the military to ferry employees of the Royal Naval Armaments Depot at RNAD Trecwn and Royal Aircraft Establishment at Aberporth; these contracts were crucial to the firm up to the 1960s. These decreased rapidly throughout the 1980s and stopped during the 1990s.

In 1958 the first of many purchases was made when Owen Williams of Cardigan was acquired. In 1971 Western Welsh ceased and Richards took over the Fishguard to St Davids service. In 1972 Blue Glider of St Dogmaels was purchased from Lewis Williams followed by in 1976 by Pioneer Motors, Newport.

In 1982 the Haverfordwest operation of Marchwood Motorways was purchased. In 1998 TM Daniels of Cardigan was purchased.

== Services ==
As at June 2014 Richards Brothers operate services on 40 routes including TrawsCambria 550 and X50. Since 2015 the 550/X50 have been known as the TrawsCymru T5.

== Livery ==
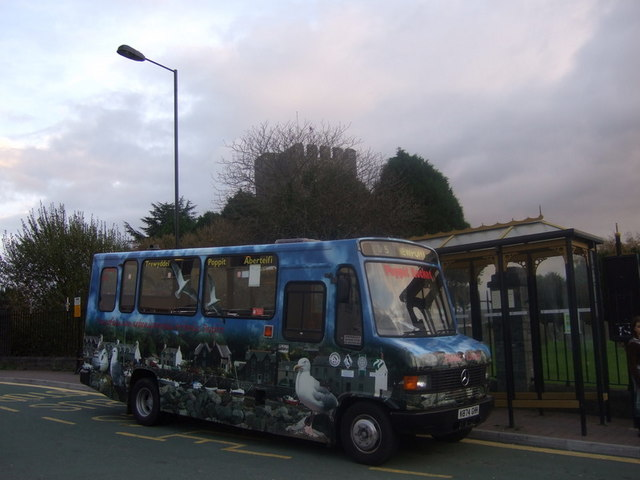
Plaxton Beaver bodied Mercedes-Benz T2 on the Poppit Rocket service in Cardigan in November 2007

Richards Bros' coaches carry a white livery with a variety of logos. The current bus livery is silver towards the front with a dark blue skirt which rises at the rear to cover the rear of the bus. This was 'pinched' from the Optare demonstration livery. This was preceded by a silver upper half with a blue skirt running straight along the bus with a red stripe along the side slightly above the blue. This in turn was preceded by a blue and maroon colour scheme, with more white added in for the coaches.

Richards Bros also operate several vehicles which carry special liveries for certain services. These include the Pembrokeshire Coastal buses (e.g. Poppit Rocket), TrawsCambria, TrawsCymru and Bwcabus.

== Fleet ==
As the company grew older, Bedford remained the dominating vehicle manufacturer; both second hand and new buses were purchased, with the largely prevailing bodybuilders being Duple and Plaxton. Over 100 Bedfords were used by the Richards family. Since Bedford closed in 1986, new buses have generally been of Volvo, DAF or Dennis manufacture.

There were only ever seven double-deck buses within the fleet, and were two Bristol K6As, an AEC Regent V, three Leyland Titans and an AEC Bridgemaster.
