= TrawsCambria =

Former express bus network in Wales

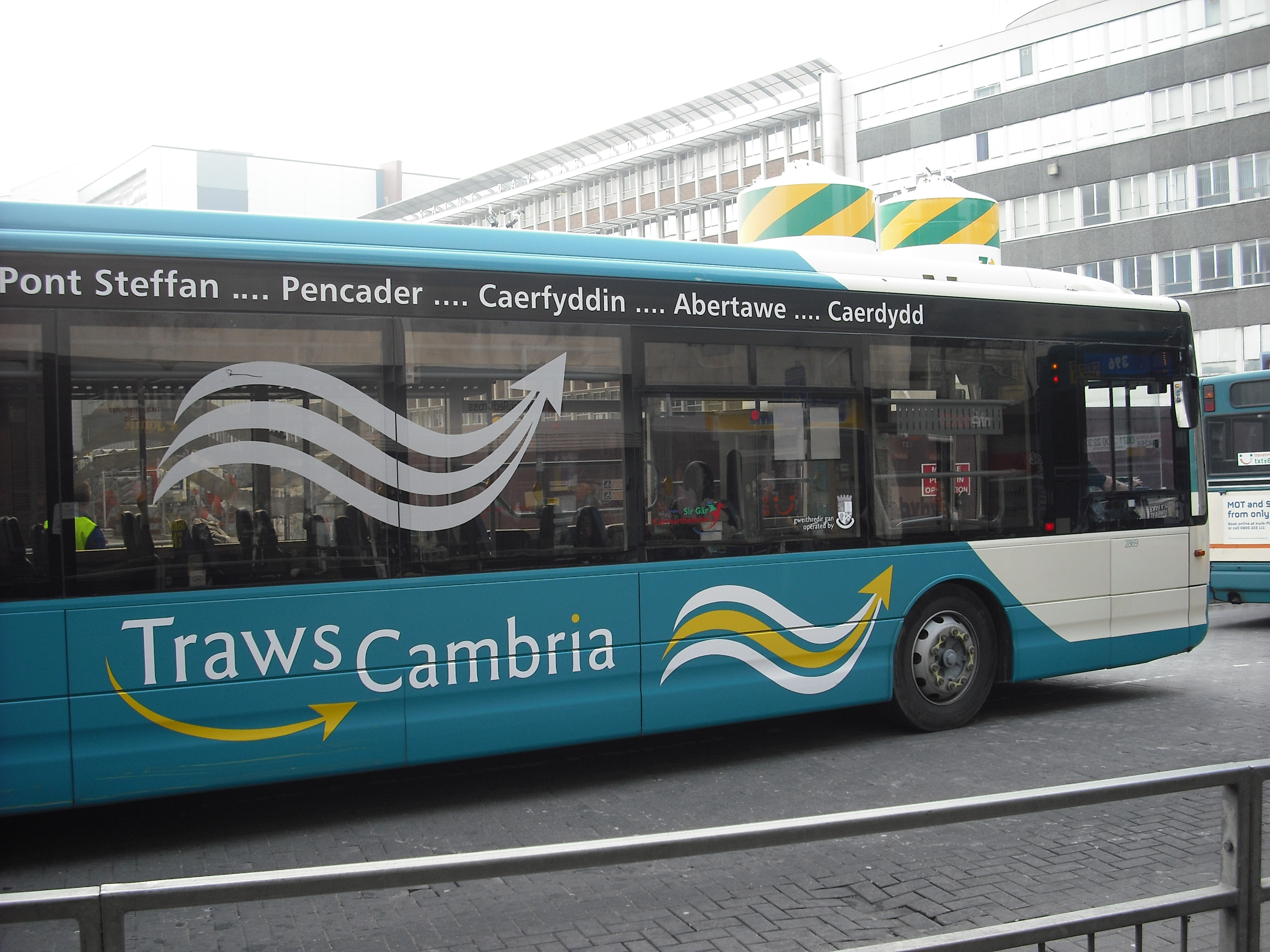
TrawsCambria liveried Optare Tempo at Cardiff bus station in April 2009

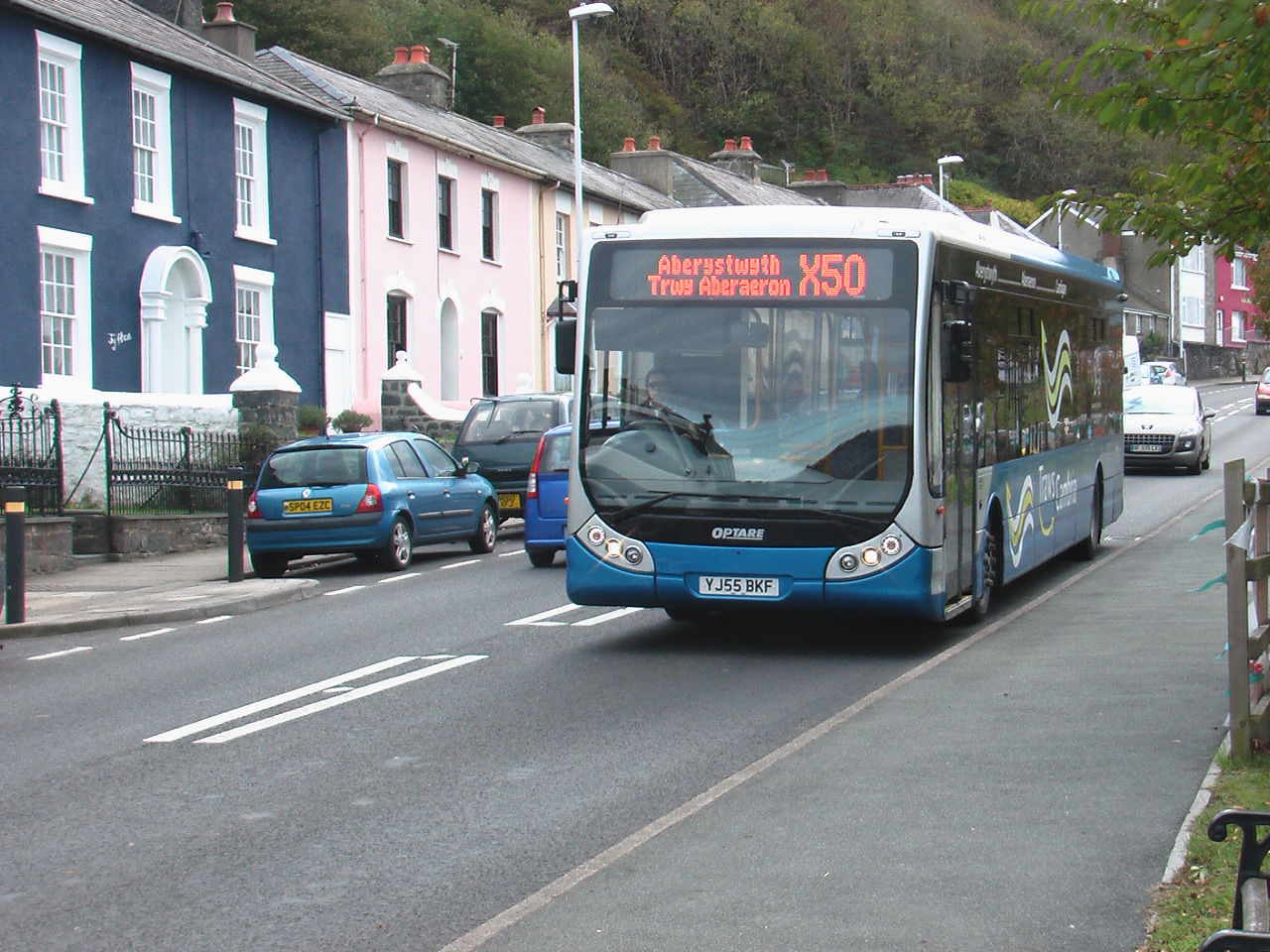
Richard Brothers Optare Tempo on route X50 in Aberaeron in February 2012

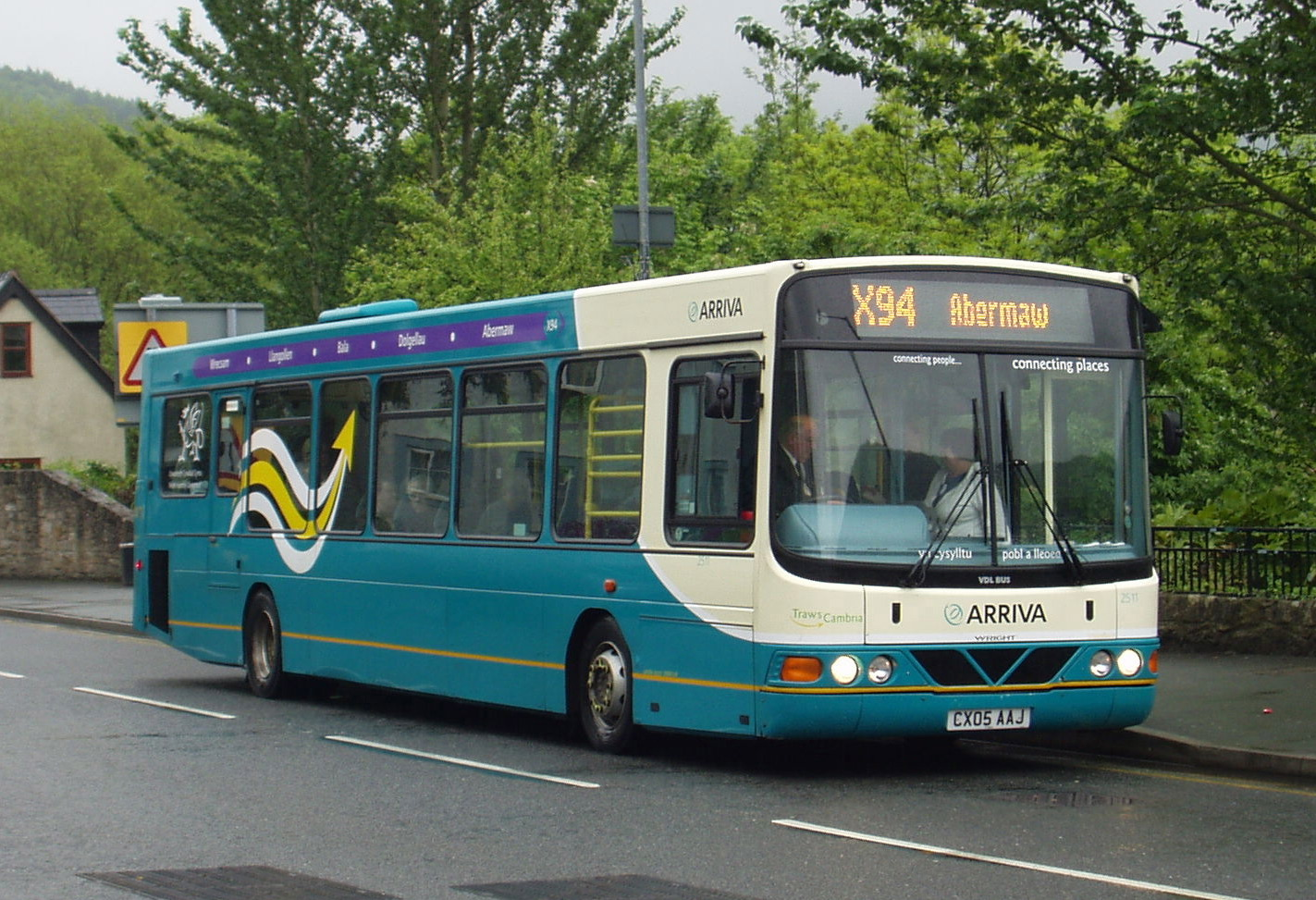
Arriva North West & Wales Wright Commander bodied VDL SB200 on route X94 in Llangollen in May 2008

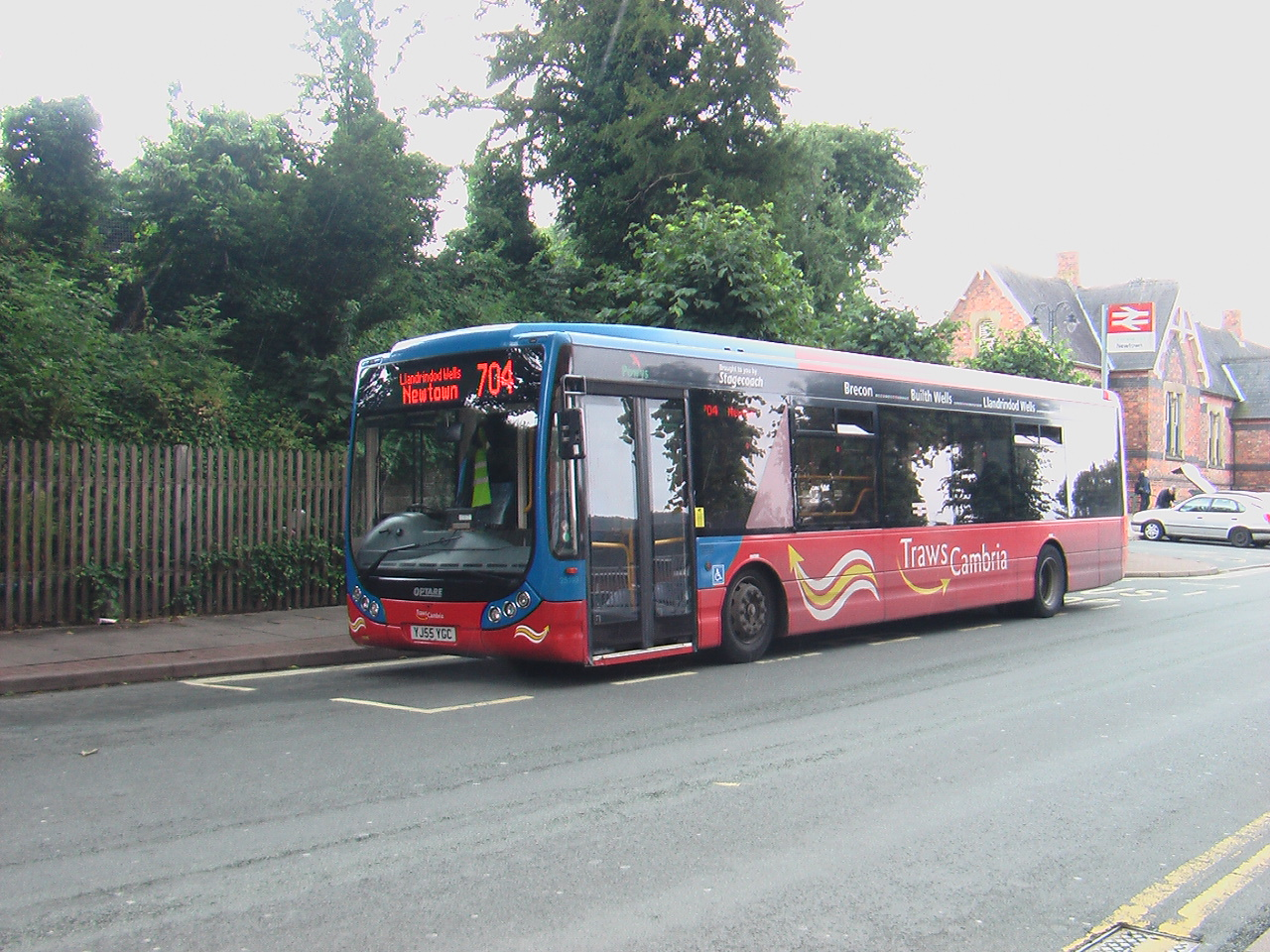
Stagecoach South Wales Optare Tempo on route 704 at Newtown railway station in July 2010

TrawsCambria was a network of medium and long-distance express bus routes in Wales sponsored by the Welsh Government.

Since 2012 services have been provided by the updated TrawsCymru network.

== History ==
=== Coach Network ===
TrawsCambria started in 1979 as the branded experimental coach service route 700 Cardiff to Bangor via Brecon, Builth Wells, Llandrindod Wells, Newtown, Machynlleth, Dolgellau, Porthmadog and Caernarfon.

The initial trial summer service operated Fridays to Mondays only with one coach in each direction on the 230-mile route, with walk-on fares. By August duplicate and triplicate operations occurred which resulted in the Welsh Office approving the continuation of the service through the winter.

The following spring saw the 700 route run daily, joined by 2 extra routes:

- 701: Cardiff to Rhyl via Swansea, Carmarthen, Lampeter, Aberystwyth, Machynlleth, Dolgellau, Betws y Coed, Blaenau Ffestiniog and Llandudno
- 702: Cardiff to Liverpool via Cwmbran, Builth Wells, Rhayader, Newtown, Wrexham and Chester

After 3 years, the 3-route network continued to run without any subsidy although daily operation on the 700 and 702 routes was cut to Friday-Monday in winter. Later the 702 route was withdrawn leaving only the 700 and 701 routes in operation.

The TrawsCambria name and the original red and green logo was a registered service mark jointly owned by National Welsh Omnibus Services of Cardiff and Crosville Motor Services of Chester. Traws, pronounced to rhyme with 'house', is the Welsh equivalent for 'cross' as in cross-country. Therefore, TrawsCambria was roughly equivalent to 'Cross-Cambria' or 'Trans-Cambria' in English.

In the 1980s, the 701 route was extended to cross the Menai Bridge to the Isle of Anglesey to reach Holyhead in North Wales. In South Wales an extension was introduced across the Severn Bridge to reach Bristol.

The 1986 privatisation of the National Bus Company subsidiaries resulted in the TrawsCambria routes becoming the responsibility of the newly formed Crosville Motor Services company. Several route modifications and cut backs resulted during this period. While profits could be made most of the year, November and February low patronage always resulted in knife edge annual performance.

In the 1990s, Crosville Motor Services was split into separate English and Welsh companies which became Crosville Wales continued to run the service jointly with Rhondda Transport, with the main route being the 701 route which uniquely linked all the Welsh universities: Glamorgan (in Pontypridd), Cardiff, Swansea, Lampeter, Aberystwyth and Bangor.

By 2000, Crosville had become part of Arriva North West & Wales and Rhondda Transport became part of Stagecoach South Wales. Further changes resulted in the 701 route becoming the only remaining TrawsCambria route linking Holyhead and Bristol via Dolgellau, Aberystwyth, Carmarthen and Cardiff. This route was modified in the early 2000s, with the northern terminus changed to Llandudno and withdrawal of the Cardiff to Bristol extension.

=== Welsh Assembly Reshaping ===
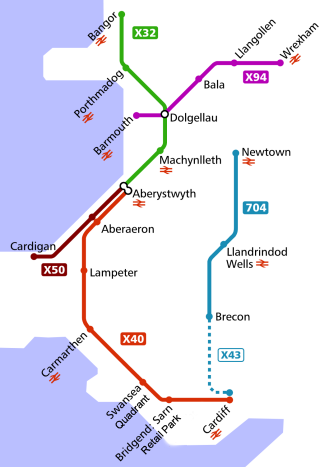
Map of the TrawsCambria network (except 550, but including connecting X43 service) before the 704 extension to Merthyr and withdrawal of Arriva TrawsCambria X40 & 550

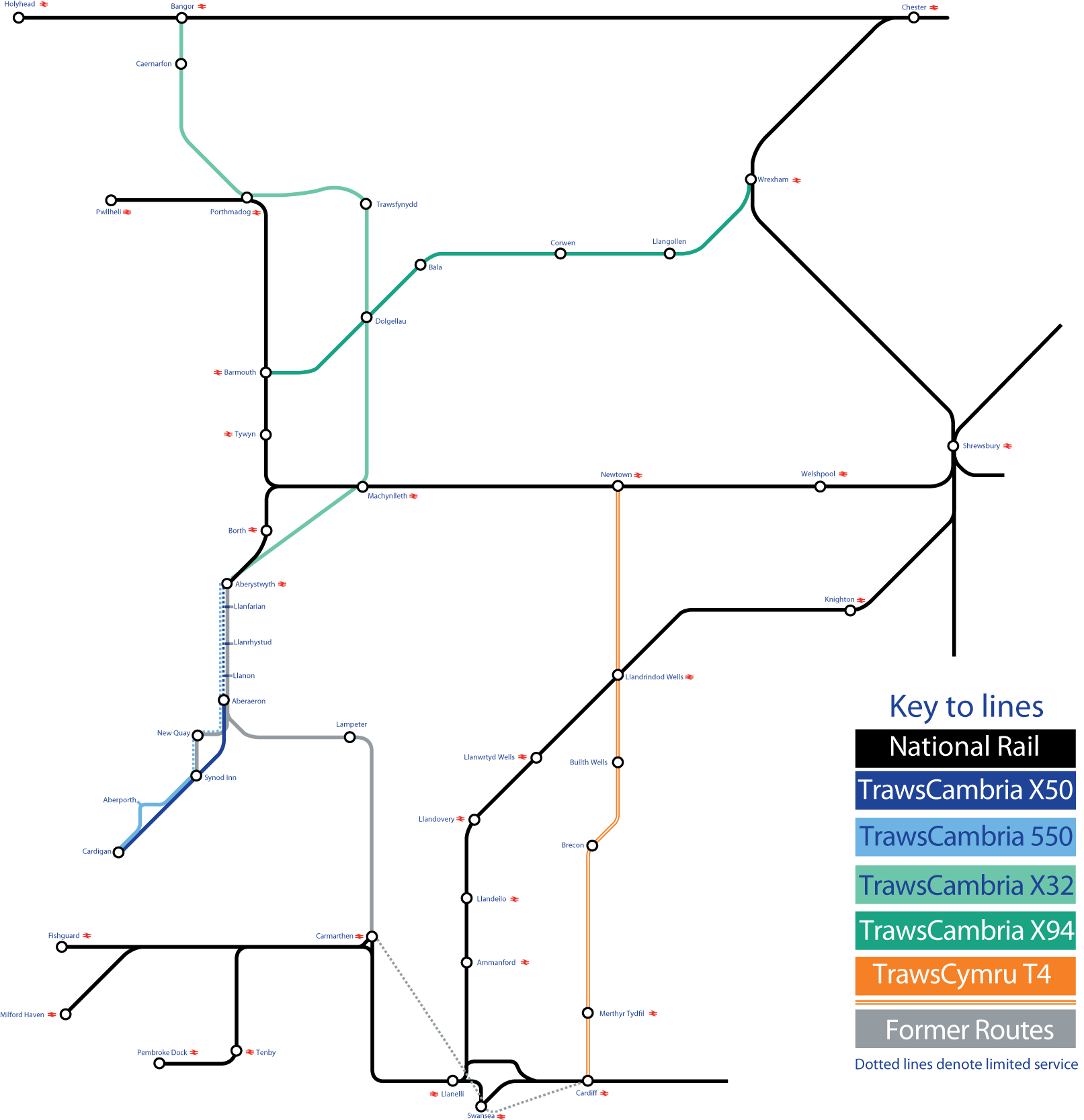
Network Map Spring/Summer 2012 showing past routes X40 and 550 & TrawsCymru service T4, along with selected rail routes. Since then, there have been many changes

Prior to and during 2005, the Welsh Assembly Government started to influence and recreate a renewed network, repositioning TrawsCambria in a new guise with shorter links with good frequencies, running with modern, high specification, low-floor buses. The first stage of this was the late 2004 withdrawal of the 701 north of Aberystwyth and creation of a new express X32 route in its place between Aberystwyth and Bangor.

While TrawsCambria was co-ordinated by the Welsh Assembly Government, the actual bus services are/were provided by a variety of private bus companies. The TrawsCambria livery was based on a common design, including TrawsCambria logos, but with the colours of the base livery selected by the operator running the service. A fleet of modern Optare Tempos were purchased for all but two of the routes, with different specifications for different routes. While not of express coach standard, some of these are significantly more comfortable than normal service buses.

With long-distance limited stop coaches being largely impractical for serving the dispersed population of Wales, the TrawsCambria network has evolved into a compromise solution between express coaches and regular service buses: it provides long-distance journey opportunities between Welsh towns while also catering for shorter-distance passenger flows along its route. Following on from the introduction of the X32 in October 2003, several additional routes were added and TrawsCambria evolved into a network of services.

The withdrawal of service 701 and introduction of the new low-floor bus fleet for the replacement Aberystwyth to Cardiff (X40) service sparked concerns and complaints about the suitability of a service bus for the four-hour journey. There was no on-board toilet, which did not make an ideal situation for such a distance. Toilet breaks (even though there are limited facilities along the rural route) would be frowned upon as they would interfere with the timetable. The X40 also did not accept concessionary travel passes for travel over the section south of Carmarthen. However some of the complaints, particularly those related to luggage space, may have been the result of Arriva Buses Wales using buses on Aberystwyth to Cardiff services other than the two specially equipped Optare Tempos ordered with Aberystwyth to Cardiff services in mind.

=== 701 Revival ===
In 2007 a private company trading as Coach Travel Wales sought to compete for passengers with the X40, re-introducing service 701 as an Aberystwyth to Cardiff Bay via Aberaeron, Lampeter, Carmarthen, Swansea, Port Talbot and Cardiff service.

Initially this ran twice-weekly with one journey from Aberystwyth in the morning, returning from Cardiff in the afternoon. This service runs using coaches with toilets and concessionary passes are accepted along the whole route.

On 29 September 2013 was later taken over by Bryan's Coaches.

The service proved popular and that popularity has continued to increase. At its peak in 2013 it operated twice daily Monday-Saturday, except for Christmas Day, Boxing Day and New Year's Day.

In 2014 a new 750 service was established, running on Thursdays and Saturdays from Aberystwyth to Cardiff via New Quay, Llandysul, Carmarthen and Swansea. The service was less successful and was terminated in 2015.

In 2015, Bryan retired, and the 701 service transferred to Lewis's Coaches of Llanrhystud. The transfer of the service was the end of an era as George Bryan had been depot manager at Crosville's Aberystwyth depot when the service was introduced.

Lewis's Coaches started their operation of the service with former Green line coaches, equipped with wheelchair lifts thus introducing accessible vehicles to the service for the first time.

Lewis Coaches closed in 2016, and Ceredigion CC has issued an amendment to its online timetable confirming the cessation of service 701 from that date.

=== Attempted Relaunch As TrawsCymru ===
Following a Welsh Assembly Government consultation on improvements to the TrawsCambria network, in 2010, a programme of improvements for TrawsCambria services X40 and 704/T4 was announced. New buses were the main improvement identified. These would be equipped with coach style seating, greater luggage space, real time information and WiFi. The Welsh Assembly Government decided these upgraded routes, and eventually the network as a whole, were to be re-launched under the new TrawsCymru brand. As part of the re-branding, service X40 was to be re-numbered TC1 and T4 would have become TC4. The T4 upgrade and re-branding went ahead, but without the planned renumbering to TC4.

==== CymruExpress ====
However, before the contract for the TC1 service could be let, Arriva Buses Wales decided to cease operation of the TrawsCambria X40 and their section of the TrawsCambria 550 service from 26 February 2012. Instead they introduced their own services along the routes on a fully commercial basis, under the brand 'CymruExpress', meaning these routes no longer formed part of the TrawsCambria network. The CymruExpress services were:

- Service 10: Aberystwyth to Swansea. This was additional to the hourly Carmarthen – Aberystwth service, unlike the former X40 service, but only operated on Fridays and Sundays during university term time. The service was withdrawn from 28 July 2013
- Service 20: Aberystwyth to Cardiff. This was also additional to the hourly Carmarthen – Aberystwyth service and operated all week. When first introduced, unlike the former X40 services to Cardiff, it did not travel via Swansea. However, after service 10 was withdrawn the 20 was rerouted via Swansea.
- Service 40: Aberystwyth to Carmarthen (replacement for X40). Compared to the X40, early morning northbound journeys were cut drastically on Saturdays, with the first bus from Carmarthen not reaching Aberystwyth until 11:15. An improvement however was the introduction of a (very scant) Sunday service of two trips each way. The initial timetable also promised that the journey time would be cut drastically. However, the service was not able to reliably keep to the timetable and the timings were later adjusted to be more realistic.
- Service 50: Aberystwyth to Synod Inn via New Quay (replacement for 550).

As part of the CymruExpress launch, Arriva returned the TrawsCambria Optare Tempos and replaced them with Wright Pulsars (on services 40 and 50) and a pair of Van Hool Alizée coaches (for use on services 10 and 20). The Pulsars were initially planned to be an interim measure, until new Wright Eclipse Gemini double-deckers could be introduced in August 2012. However, these were never introduced. The decision to operate the CymruExpress routes commercially prevented the introduction of the TrawsCymru TC1 service.

==== Second Chance ====
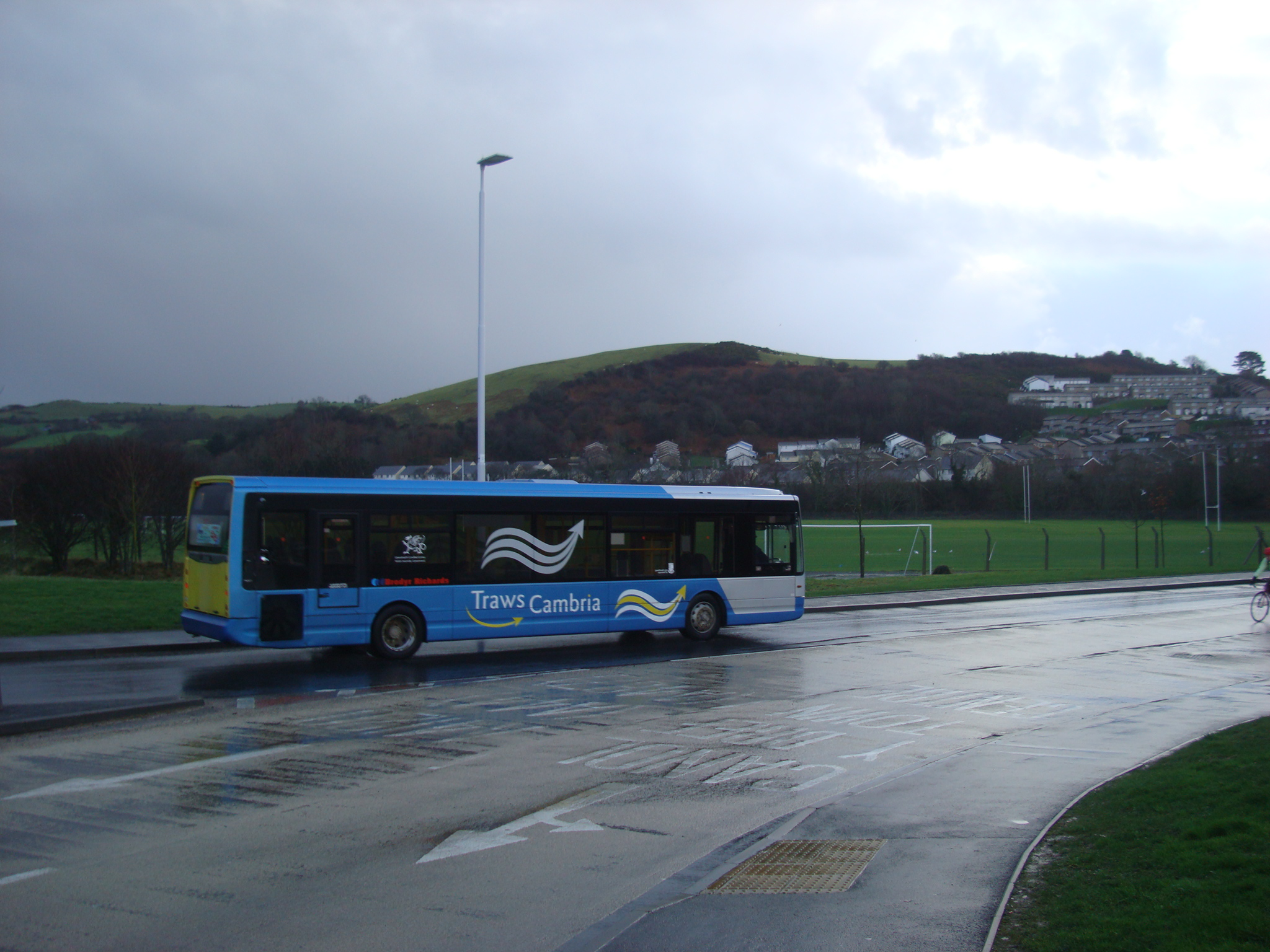
Richard Brothers Optare Tempo was the last bus to carry a TrawsCambria livery, seen in Aberystwyth in January 2015

Arriva later decided to close their Aberystwyth depot and related outstations. As such, all remaining CymruExpress services were withdrawn, with the last services running on 21 December 2013. With the commercial operation cancelled, the local councils and Welsh Government were once again able to subsidise bus services on the corridor, giving them a second chance to introduce a TrawsCymru service.

Initially, the local councils let interim contracts to maintain bus services in the area. One of these, a subsidised version of service 40, was jointly operated by First Cymru and Lewis Coaches. Service 50 was replaced by a new service titled X50 operated by Richards Brothers, also funded by the council. Both these interim services commenced operation on 23 December 2013. These interim contracts did not include any Sunday services, meaning that as of Sunday 15 December there were no Sunday bus services operating in Ceredigion (a single round trip between Aberystwyth and Cardiff is provided by the 701 service, but that is a coach not a bus). Neither of these contracts were for TrawsCymru services, but as interim services they were intended to run for approximately six months, until the Summer of 2014, whilst the Wales Government looked at options for the longer-term future of nationally strategic transport services.

It later emerged that a TrawsCymru service on the Aberystwyth – Carmarthen route would indeed finally be delivered. The original plan for the X40 to be renumbered as TC1 and receive six new Welsh Government owned Optare Tempo buses however was not to be. Instead, the new TrawsCymru service is known as the T1 and buses are provided by the operator, First Cymru, rather than the Welsh Government which has diverted the Tempos ordered for the TC1 to other routes. The T1 contract includes a limited Sunday service, and commenced on 3 August 2014.

== Past Services ==
=== X32: Bangor to Aberystwyth ===
X32

Overview
- Operator: Arriva Buses Wales
- Predecessors: 701

Route
- Start: Bangor
- Via: Caernarfon; Porthmadog; Dolgellau; Machynlleth
- End: Aberystwyth

Service
- Level: Mondays-Saturdays

This service ran roughly every two hours on Mondays to Saturdays from Bangor to Aberystwyth Mondays to Saturdays. This service was introduced in October 2003 and was operated by Arriva Buses Wales. After being subsidised for several years, in 2012 Arriva agreed to run the service on a commercial basis, but later found this unviable and decided to cancel the service in September 2012.

=== X40: Aberystwyth to Carmarthen ===
X40

Overview
- Operator: Arriva Buses Wales
- Predecessors: 540; 701

Route
- Start: Aberystwyth
- Via: Aberaeron; Lampeter; Llandysul
- End: Carmarthen

Service
- Level: Daily

This was a WAG-funded service using Optare Tempos. The core Aberystwyth to Carmarthen X40 service was generally hourly Mondays to Saturdays, with two services a day extended to/from Cardiff via Swansea and one to Swansea only. There was one return Aberystwyth to Cardiff service on Sundays.

The service was introduced in February 2005 and was operated jointly by Arriva Buses Wales and First Cymru until December 2009 when Arriva took over the whole service. This TrawsCambria service ceased on 26 February 2012 and was replaced by Arriva CymruExpress service 40 (which was subsequent terminated in December 2013).

=== X50: Cardigan to Aberaeron / Aberystwyth ===
X50

Overview
- Operator: Richards Brothers

Route
- Start: Cardigan
- End: Aberaeron / Aberystwyth

Service
- Level: Monday-Saturday

This service operated roughly every two hours between Aberaeron and Cardigan Monday – Saturday, with 4 journeys extended to/from Aberystwyth. This service avoided the lengthy diversions to New Quay and Aberporth, which were served by the slower TrawsCambria 550 service. The service was operated by Richards Brothers using WAG-funded Optare Tempos.

The services between Cardigan and Aberaeron only were supposed have connections with the TrawsCambria X40 for travel to/from Aberystwyth. However, Arriva's X40 timetable change in late 2011 removed the northbound connections. This led to a call for all X50 services to be extended to Aberystwyth. However, since X40 and 550 were operated commercially between Aberystwyth and Aberaeron, the council were unable to provide subsidy for this. When the TrawsCambria X40 ceased, the connections at Aberaeron were maintained, with CymruExpress route 40 replacing the X40.

=== X50: Cardigan to Aberystwyth ===
X50

Overview
- Operator: Richards Brothers

Route
- Start: Cardigan
- Via: New Quay
- End: Aberystwyth

Service
- Level: Monday-Saturday

This service was introduced on 23 December 2013 and operated on a roughly hourly timetable, Monday – Saturday. Some services (generally alternate trips) also ran via Aberporth. As such, this route had much more in common with the former TrawsCambria 550 service than the X50 prior to 23 December 2013, which avoided the lengthy diversions to New Quay and Aberporth (from 23 December 2013 onwards, only one service each way continued to avoid New Quay). The service was operated by Richards Brothers using a mixture of vehicles, including some of the TrawsCambria Optare Tempos, the last remaining TrawsCambria-branded vehicles. The TrawsCambria branding was however not re-applied to some of the Tempos (which were repainted having previously carried Arriva's version of the TrawsCambria livery), given the eventual intention to retire the TrawsCambria brand entirely.

The last service ran on 3 January 2015. It was replaced by TrawsCymru service T5. All but one of the remaining TrawsCambria-liveried buses were repainted into TrawsCymru livery by this point.

=== 550: Cardigan to Aberystwyth ===
550

Overview
- Operator: Richards Brothers

Route
- Start: Cardigan
- Via: Aberporth; New Quay
- End: Aberystwyth

Service
- Level: Monday-Saturday

This service has been through many phases, before effectively being renumbered as service X50 on 23 December 2013. WAG-funded Optare Tempos were the main vehicles used.

The initial service ran the full length of the coast from Aberystwyth to Cardigan, including the diversions into New Quay and into Aberporth. The service was roughly 2-hourly between Cardigan and Synod Inn, with the frequency from Synod Inn to Aberystwyth being double that. Most services were operated by Arriva Buses Wales, with a few trips run by Richards Brothers.

In 2010, Arriva Buses Wales ceased operating services to Cardigan. However, they retained the hourly section of the service (between Synod Inn and Aberystwyth, via New Quay). The southern section of route, still roughly every two hours, was then solely operated by Richards Brothers, with a change of bus being required at Synod Inn except for a few services operated by Richards Brothers from Cardigan to Aberaeron, New Quay and Aberystwyth (the latter only on two evening journeys). This arrangement continued until the Arriva operation ceased to be a TrawsCambria service and was replaced by Arriva service 50

From 27 February 2012 the service was operated solely by Richards Brothers. Initially, it consisted primarily of a Cardigan to Synod Inn shuttle (via Aberporth) roughly every two hours. A few services extended further, including trips to New Quay or Aberaeron and two evening trips to Aberystwyth. The services that terminated at Synod Inn connected with Arriva Buses Wales CymruExpress 50 to Aberystwyth via New Quay.

Later in 2012, Richards Brothers extended the services that terminated at Synod Inn to Aberaeron via the direct route, avoiding New Quay. Passengers for Aberystwth were then expected to change at Aberaeron for Arriva's CymruExpress 40 service, much easier than changing bus at remote Synod Inn. The downside however was that connections to New Quay were lost. This made Cardigan – New Quay journeys almost impossible save for the handful of existing through services between Cardigan and New Quay (including the evening runs to/from Aberystywth) which were retained.

=== X94: Wrexham to Barmouth ===
X94

Overview
- Operator: GHA Coaches

Route
- Start: Wrexham
- Via: Llangollen; Bala; Dolgellau
- End: Barmouth

Service
- Level: Daily

This service followed a route which closely approximated that of the Ruabon to Barmouth railway line which was closed to passengers in 1965. It was operated by Arriva Buses Wales Monday-Saturday and GHA Coaches on Sundays until 23 December 2013. Following this, GHA Coaches took over 7 days a week, and at some point the Sunday/Public Holiday service was renumbered as T3. The frequency along most of the route was roughly 2-hourly (every 2 hours). On 1 November 2014 the X94 was finally withdrawn and replaced by TrawsCymru serviceT3.

=== 704: Newtown to Brecon ===
704

Overview
- Operator: Stagecoach South Wales

Route
- Start: Newtown
- Via: Llandrindod Wells
- End: Brecon

Service
- Level: Daily

This service started in January 2006, was operated by Stagecoach South Wales and ran until 31 May 2011, using Optare Tempos. It was unusual in not connecting with any other TrawsCambria services at any point, and because parts of the route had not seen a regular bus service since 1970. It was replaced by TrawsCymru service T4 and extended south from Brecon to Merthyr Tydfil. Although Merthyr Tydfil may not be an especially popular destination for Newtown residents, onward connections to Cardiff were available by train and bus (service X4). As of January 2013, the service has been fully rebranded as a TrawsCymru route and has been extended to Cardiff.

== Current Service ==
As of November 2015 all Trawscymru services were launched. No Trawscambria routes remain.

== Key Connecting/Complementary Routes ==
- Stagecoach South Wales services 43 and X43, which are designated 'TrawsCymru Connect' run between Brecon, Crickhowell and Abergavenny on a two-hourly basis, connected with the 704 TrawsCambria service (the 704 is now the T4 TrawsCymru service).
- Service 412 Cardigan – Newport – Fishguard – Haverfordwest, was advertised in some timetables as connecting at Cardigan with X50 services.
- While Arriva were operating the Carmarthen-Aberystwyth service as CymruExpress, the X50/550 TrawsCambria services attempted to maintain connections with the service at Aberaeron
- 64 Brecon – Llandovery
- X75 Shrewsbury – Llanidloes/Rhayader
- X4 Hereford/Abergavenny/Brynmawr/Merthyr Tydfil – Cardiff.
- Service 701 (Aberystwyth- Aberaeron- Lampeter- Carmarthen- Cross Hands- Swansea- Port Talbot- Cardiff- Cardiff Bay) Bryan's Coaches' replacement of original TrawsCambria route
- Service 750 (Aberystwyth- Aberaeron- New Quay- Llandysul- Carmarthen- Cross Hands- Swansea- Port Talbot- Cardiff- Cardiff Bay) Operated by Bryan's Coaches

== Vehicles ==
This section lists dedicated vehicles which were formerly used on TrawsCambria services

| Vehicle Type | Image | Initial Operator | Route Branding | Number | Registration Number(s) | Notes |
|---|---|---|---|---|---|---|
| Wright Commander | One of the X32 vehicles | Arriva Buses Wales | X32 | Unknown | Including CX54EPL and CX54EPJ | |
| Wright Commander | One of the X94 vehicles | Arriva Buses Wales | X94 | Unknown | Unknown | |
| Optare Tempo X1260 | YJ55BKF, one of the X50 vehicles | Richards Bros | X50 (Aberystwyth – Aberaeron – Cardigan) | 2 | YJ55BKE, YJ55BKF= | Like the X40 Cardiff vehicles, these are longer than the vehicles for 550 and the other X40 vehicles. However, unlike the X40 vehicles for the Cardiff trips, the X50 pair of Tempos have the same interior and number of seats as the buses for 550 and Carmarthen X40s. This has resulted in greater legroom, making them more comfortable. These two were among the last three vehicles to carry TrawsCambria livery. |
| Optare Tempo X1200 | One of the Optare Tempos for route 704 | Stagecoach | Route 704 | 3 | YJ55YFY, YJ55YFZ, YJ55YGC | These buses have been relivered as part of the rebranding to TrawsCymru for route T4/TC4. They have a slightly less messy version of the livery without the silver areas (which are white on these vehicles) |
| Optare Tempo X1200 | X40 Optare Tempo in Carmarthen Bus Station | Arriva Buses Wales | X40 (Aberystwyth – Aberaeron – Lampeter – Pencader – Carmarthen) | 3 | YJ55BKO, YJ55BKU, YJ55BKV | Withdrawn from service alongside withdrawal of TrawsCambria X40 and Arriva's half of service 550 |
| Optare Tempo X1200 | Image Not Available | First Cymru | X40 (Aberystwyth – Aberaeron – Lampeter – Pencader – Carmarthen) | 3 | YJ55BJE, YJ55BJF, YJ55BJK | Two vehicles (YJ55BJE & BY55BJF) transferred to Arriva and the third (YJ55BJK) to Richards Bros (possibly via Arriva) when Arriva took over operating First's share of the X40 and Richards Bros took over the 550 south of Synod Inn. All three lost the route branding when repainted (YJ55BJK into Richards' version of TrawsCambria livery and the other two into Arriva livery). YJ55BJF was then scrapped due to fire damage. |
| Optare Tempo X1200 | YJ55BKN (a 550-branded vehicle) working the X40 service in Aberystwyth | Arriva Buses Wales | 550 (Aberystwyth – Aberaeron – New Quay – Aberporth – Cardigan) | 5 | YJ55BKG, YJ55BKK, YJ55BKL, YJ55BKN, YJ06YRY | These vehicles were withdrawn from service alongside withdrawal of TrawsCambria X40 and Arriva's half of service 550. Two (YJ55BKN and YJ06YRY) then joined Richards Bros' fleet (one in Richards Bros livery, the other in an unbranded form of TrawsCymru livery) with their 550 route branding removed. |
| Optare Tempo X1260 | The X40 service leaving Cardiff Central bus station | Arriva Buses Wales | X40 (Aberystwyth – Aberaeron – Lampeter – Pencader – Carmarthen – Swansea – Cardiff) | 2 | YJ06YRO, YJ06YRZ | Longer than the vehicles for 550 and the other X40 vehicles. Fitted with tables, power sockets, extra luggage racks and leather (or fake leather) seat covers. These buses were withdrawn from service when the X40 ceased operating, but by the end of 2012 had reappeared in a new livery (an unbranded version of TrawsCymru) now working for Richards Bros |

== See also ==
- Transport in Wales
- TrawsCymru
