= Stagecoach South Wales =

Bus operator in South East Wales

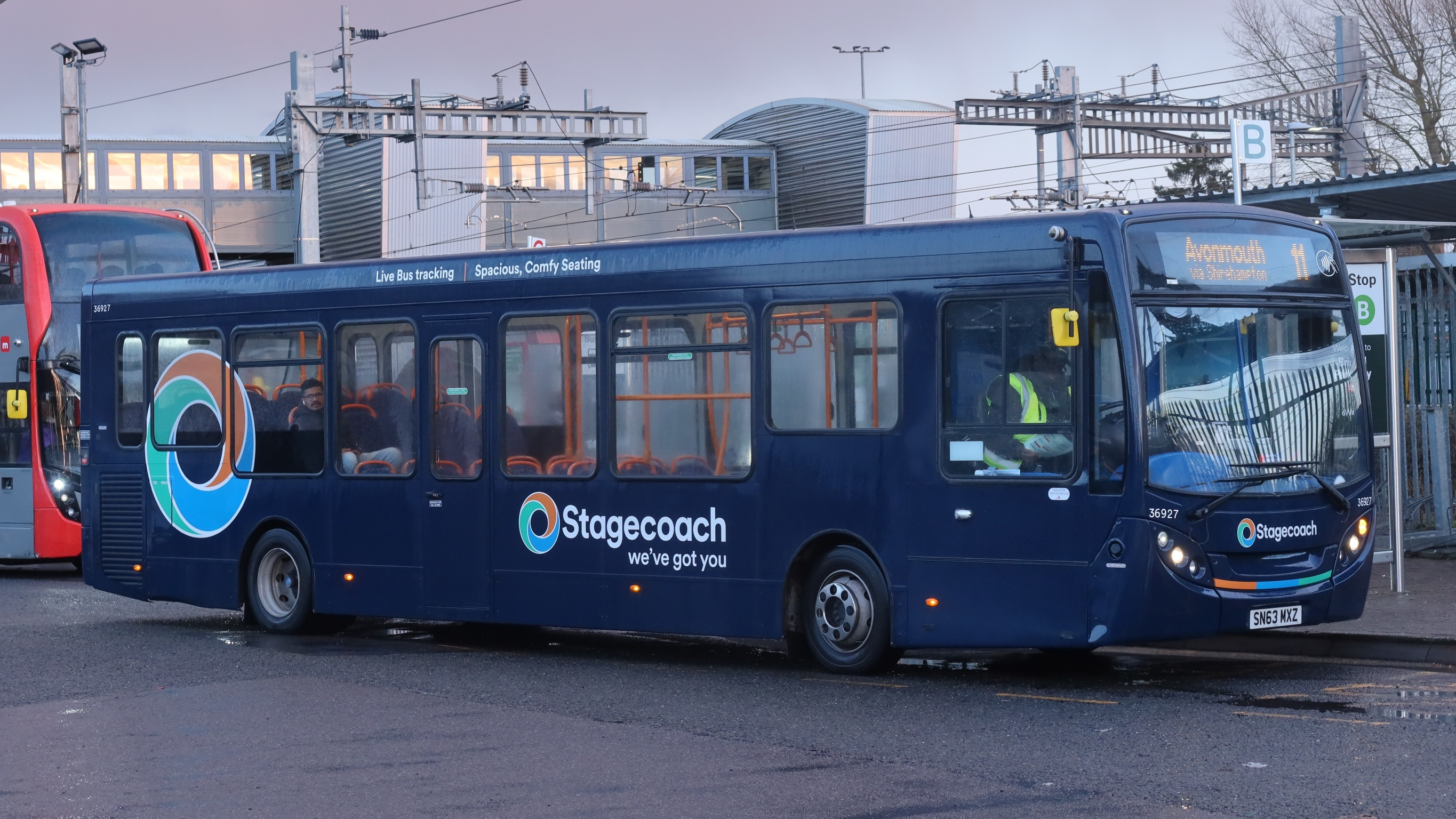
- Alexander Dennis Enviro200 at Bristol Parkway in March 2026
- Parent: Stagecoach Group
- Founded: November 1993; 32 years ago
- Headquarters: Cwmbran
- Service area: Bristol; Cardiff; South East Wales
- Service type: Bus
- Depots: 7
- Fleet: 340 (2022)
- Managing Director: Chris Hanson
- Website: Official website

Stagecoach South Wales is a bus operator providing services in South East Wales. It is a subsidiary of the Stagecoach Group. It is the largest operator of bus services in Wales, in the United Kingdom.

== History ==
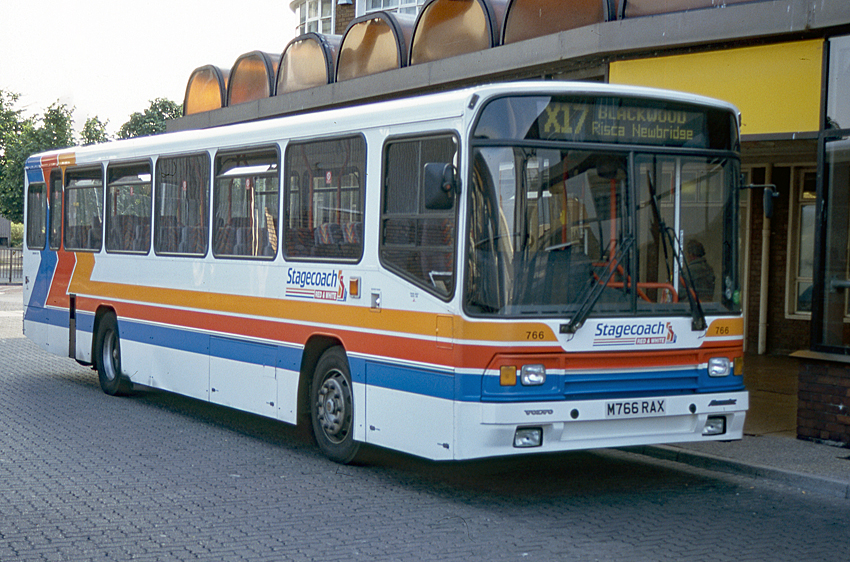
Stagecoach Red & White Alexander PS bodied Volvo B10M in Cardiff Central bus station in June 1996

In January 1991, Cheltenham-based Western Travel purchased the eastern division of former National Bus Company (NBC) subsidiary National Welsh Omnibus Services, which consisted of 180 buses based from depots in Brynmawr, Chepstow, Crosskeys, Cwmbran and Ross on Wye. The purchased division was renamed Red & White, with the area's services having been operated by Red & White Services until being merged into Western Welsh by the NBC in 1978.

In February 1992, a 10% shareholding in Rhondda Buses, formed following the December 1991 collapse of National Welsh to purchase the Caerphilly and Porth depots from administrators, was acquired, quelling potential competition between Rhondda Buses and Red & White. Rhondda Buses was owned by a consortium of bus operators, which included British Bus, Potteries Motor Traction, Stevensons of Uttoxeter and Julian Peddle. Red & White subsequently purchased municipal bus company Cynon Valley Transport from Cynon Valley Council in August 1992 after the company had fallen into receivership, expanding operations into the Aberdare and Merthyr Tydfil areas.

In November 1993, Red & White's parent Western Travel was sold to Stagecoach Holdings, subsequently resulting in Red & White being rebranded as Stagecoach Red & White. Stagecoach later purchased the shares of the Rhondda Buses consortium members, which now consisted of Arriva, FirstBus and Julian Peddle, in December 1997, taking full ownership of Rhondda bus services. While the company was rebranded to Stagecoach Rhondda, the former operator's Caerphilly and Rhymney Valley services were incorporated into Stagecoach Red & White.

In February 2000, all Stagecoach operations in the South Wales area were rebranded as Stagecoach in South Wales as part of the group's national rebrand; Ross on Wye depot's services were rebranded as Stagecoach in Wye & Dean and transferred to neighbouring Stagecoach West. In September 2000, local independent Phil Anslow Travel's bus services were purchased, further expanding Stagecoach's presence in South East Wales.

In November 2004, Stagecoach purchased the remaining operations of Phil Anslow Travel, consisting of six minibuses and 15 coaches. Phil Anslow Travel's bus services were integrated into Stagecoach in South Wales, whilst the coaching business became Red & White Coaches, which failed to remain profitable and ceased operations in April 2006. Phil Anslow has since resumed the operation of bus services.

In February 2006, Stagecoach purchased Eastern Valleys independent operator Crosskeys Coach Hire, who traded as Glyn Williams Travel with a fleet of 29 vehicles and 50 employees, following the owner's retirement. Glyn Williams' operating area was within that of Stagecoach in South Wales' and many of their trunk services had been operated jointly with Stagecoach.

In January 2010, Caerphilly County Borough Council sold Islwyn Borough Transport, the smallest remaining municipal bus operator in the United Kingdom following deregulation, to Stagecoach South Wales. The sale attracted some controversy after it was found the council had consulted only Stagecoach instead of putting the company's sale up to public tender, with Caerphilly County Borough Council also accused of selling Islwyn Borough Transport in order to recoup £15 million lost when an Icelandic bank the council invested in collapsed during the 2008 financial crisis.

In late 2025, Stagecoach West's operations in Bristol, based from a single depot in Patchway, South Gloucestershire and mainly operating routes under contract to the West of England Combined Authority, were moved to Stagecoach South Wales.

== Services ==
=== Stagecoach Gold ===
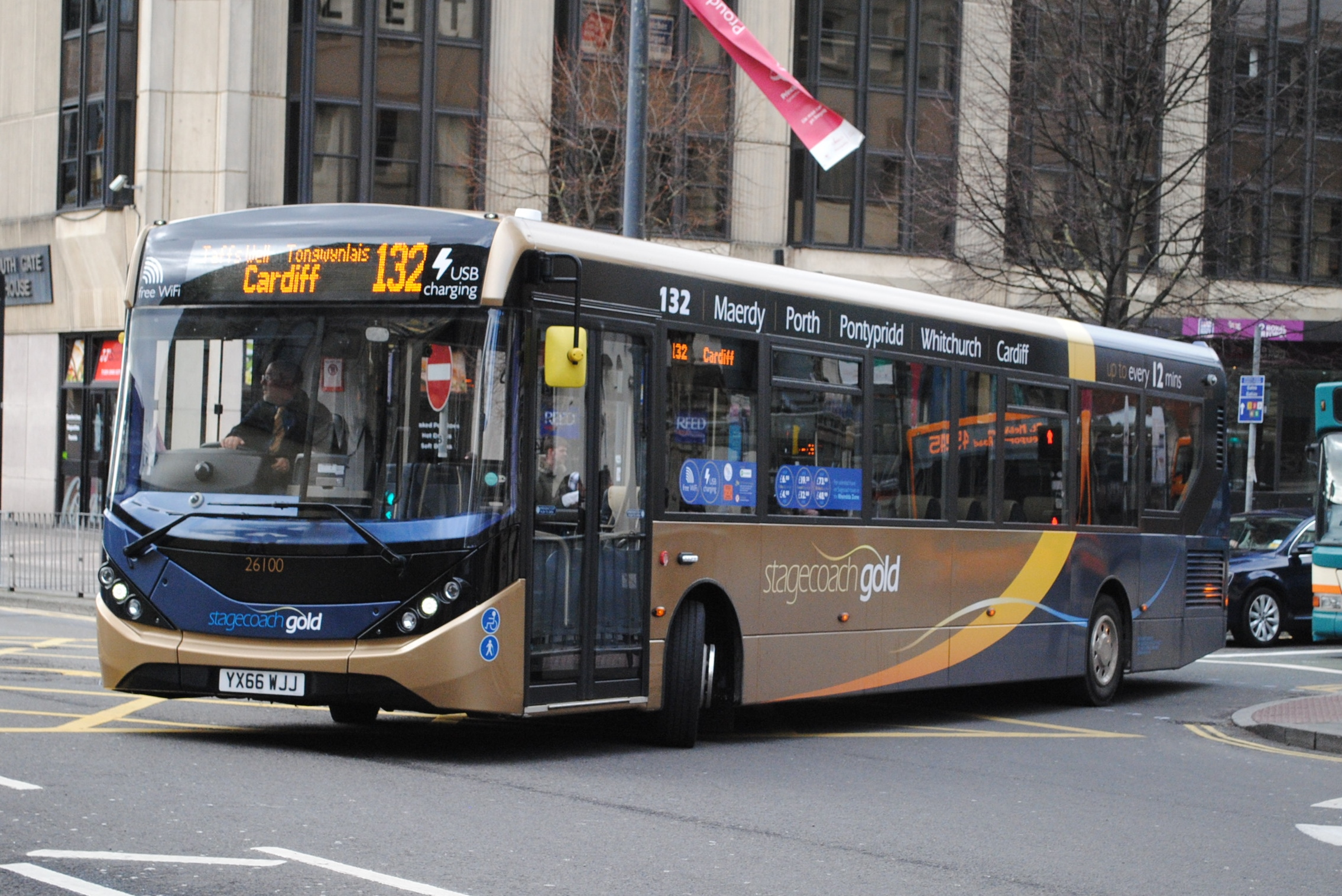
Gold specification Alexander Dennis Enviro200 MMC operating service 132 in Cardiff, February 2017

Until the company's services began to be rebranded into the group's current 'Long Distance' livery in 2022, Stagecoach South Wales operated the most Gold specification vehicles in the Stagecoach Group. Gold services were first introduced to South Wales in 2015 with the introduction of service X24 between Blaenavon and Newport via Pontypool and Cwmbran, operated by Gold specification Alexander Dennis Enviro300s.

Gold services were introduced to the Rhondda Valley in December 2016, with service 132 Maerdy and Cardiff being upgraded with 24 Gold specification Alexander Dennis Enviro200 MMCs, followed by a further 24 Gold Enviro200 MMCs introduced on services 120 and 130, operating from Blaencwm and Blaenrhondda to Caerphilly, in December 2017; the Gold brand was withdrawn from services 120 and 130 due to a lack of demand in May 2019.

Services 26 and 151 from Blackwood to Cardiff and Newport respectively were upgraded to Gold status in 2019, while Gold specification Optare Solo SRs were also introduced on Cwmbran town services 1,2,5,6 and 7 in 2019. Three of these Gold buses were named after Cwmbran residents voted to be their 'local heroes' by members of the public.

=== TrawsCymru ===
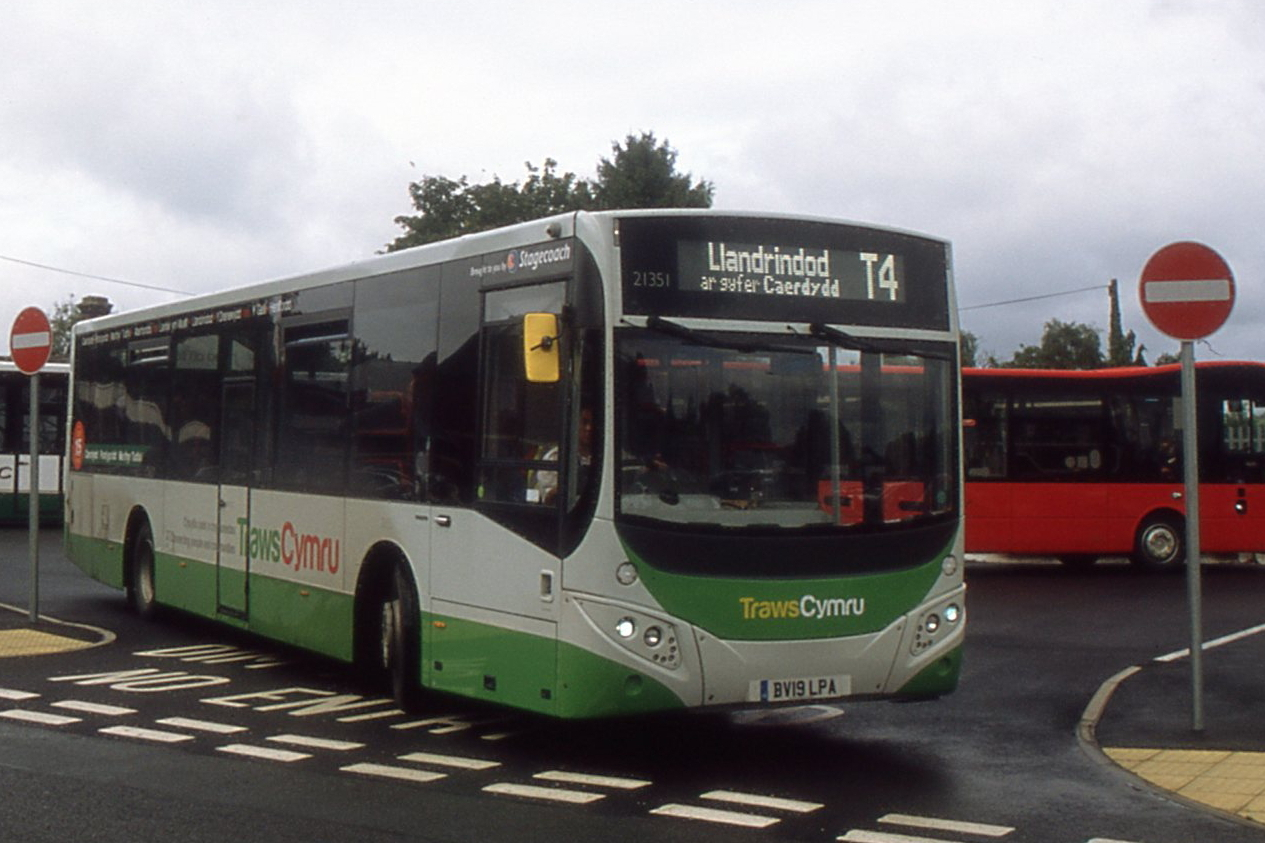
Stagecoach TrawsCymru MCV Evora bodied Volvo B8RLE in Llandrindod Wells, December 2019

Stagecoach South Wales operates Transport for Wales-contracted TrawsCymru services T4 and T14, which start from Newtown and Hereford respectively and both finish at Cardiff, serving Llandrindod Wells, Builth Wells, Brecon, Hay-on-Wye (T14 only), Merthyr Tydfil and Pontypridd. Service T4 was the first TrawsCymru route to be introduced on the network in July 2011, replacing the previous TrawsCambria 704 service between Newtown and Brecon, while the T14 service was introduced in September 2018. Both routes are operated by Stagecoach using MCV Evora bodied Volvo B8RLEs, introduced to replace older Optare Tempos and Alexander Dennis Enviro300s on the services in July 2019.

=== Fflecsi ===
Stagecoach South Wales commenced operations on Transport for Wales' Fflecsi demand responsive transport service in Rhondda Cynon Taf in partnership with the county borough council in July 2020, operating pilot service 152, serving Tonypandy and Hendreforgan via Penygraig, Williamstown, Penrhiwfer, Tonyrefail and Thomastown, replacing an equivalent of the service operated commercially by Stagecoach. Fflecsi services in Blaenau Gwent were later launched in June 2021, described as the most successful Fflecsi trial service in May 2022 with an average weekly ridership of 1,000 passengers, however the service was withdrawn in June 2023.

== Fleet and depots ==
As of February 2026, the Stagecoach South Wales fleet consisted of 340 buses based from six depots in Aberdare, Bristol, Cwmbran, Merthyr Tydfil, Porth and Taffs Well.

Depots formerly operated by Stagecoach South Wales included Brynmawr depot, which closed on 21 July 2014 and was turned into an outstation, resulting in cuts in bus services in the area, and Blackwood depot, which closed on 5 February 2023, with buses and some staff moved to the Caerphilly and Cwmbran depots. Caerphilly depot was closed during 2025 after Stagecoach opened a new depot in Taffs Well.

== See also ==
- Bus transport in Cardiff
