= Arriva Max =

Premium brand used by various Arriva bus subsidiaries in the United Kingdom

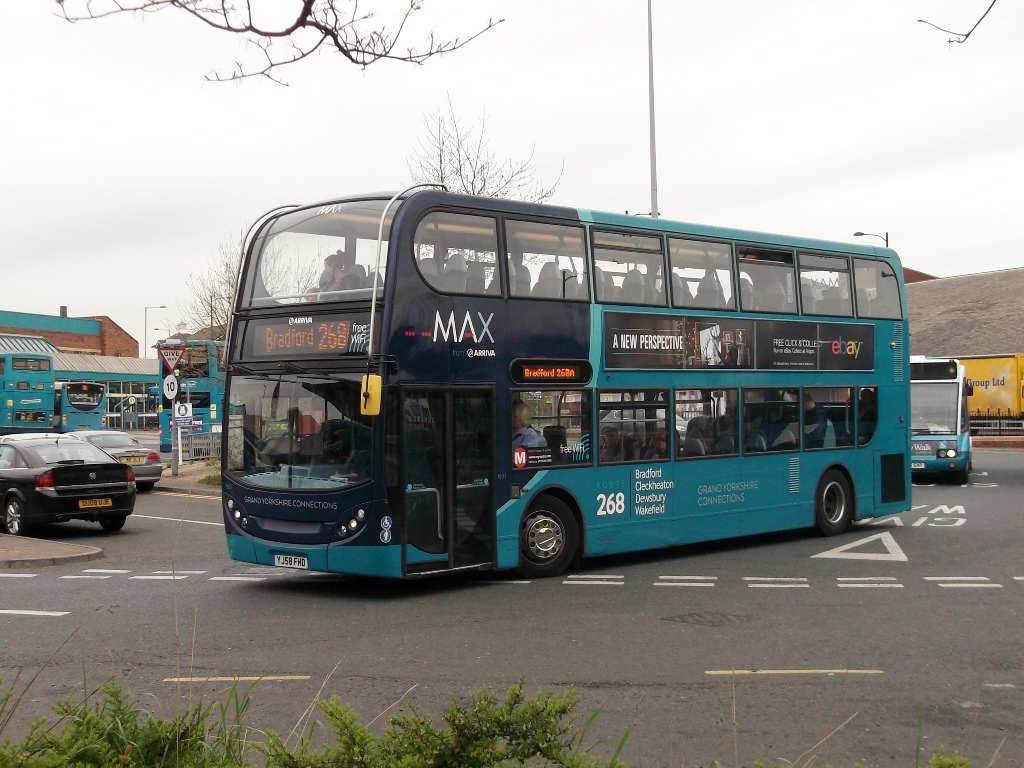
- Arriva Yorkshire Alexander Dennis Enviro400 at Wakefield bus station in April 2015
- Parent: Arriva
- Founded: September 2014
- Service type: Premium bus
- Routes: 13 (October 2022)
- Fleet: Mercedes-Benz Citaro; VDL DB300/Wright Gemini 2 Scania OmniCity; Alexander Dennis Enviro400; Wright StreetLite; Volvo B9TL; VDL SB200/Wright Pulsar
- Operator: Arriva Buses Wales; Arriva North East; Arriva Shires & Essex; Arriva Southern Counties; Arriva Yorkshire

Arriva Max was a premium brand used by various Arriva bus subsidiaries in the United Kingdom.

== History ==
In September 2014, Arriva launched the Max brand for interurban express services. The first services were launched by Arriva North East, which is cited as the creator and home of the brand (alongside jointly managed Arriva Yorkshire), with routes X10 and X11 from Newcastle to Blyth using refurbished double-deck vehicles.

The brand was additionally rolled out by Arriva Buses Wales, Arriva Shires & Essex and Arriva Southern Counties, all of which have since discontinued the brand. Arriva North East and Arriva Yorkshire increased the number of Max branded routes within their regions. Most of the new routes were launched with Titan the Robot, to celebrate and create interest in each upgrade.

The Max brand has been scaled back significantly in recent years as part of the Arriva rebrand, however some routes were withdrawn or were upgraded with new standard or refurbished Arriva Sapphire buses.

In 2022, Arriva started to phase out the Max brand nationally, with the majority of buses being repainted into the standard Arriva livery or replaced with new buses.

== Routes ==
As of July 2024, there were 8 Arriva Max routes.

Ariva Northumbria

- 306 - Newcastle to Whitley Bay via Tynemouth

=== Arriva North East ===
- X1 - Darlington to Crook and Tow Law via Bishop Auckland
- X12 - Middlesbrough to Newcastle via Durham
- X26/X27 - Darlington to Richmond and Catterick
- X46 - Durham to Crook
- X66 - Darlington to Middlesbrough
- X75/X76 - Darlington to Barnard Castle
- X66/X67 - Darlington to Middlesbrough

=== Arriva Yorkshire ===
- 202/203 - Leeds to Huddersfield via Dewsbury

== Former routes ==
=== Arriva Southern Counties ===
- 5 - Southend to Basildon, withdrawn in September 2016 due to a lack of patronage, existing First Essex routes replaced it
- 34/35 - Guildford to Camberley via Westfield, Mayford and Sutton Green, Upgraded to Arriva Sapphire.

=== Arriva The Shires ===
- 60/X60 - Milton Keynes to Aylesbury
- 150 - Milton Keynes to Aylesbury via Leighton Buzzard
- 300 - Aylesbury to High Wycombe via Princes Risborough
- 800/850 - High Wycombe to Reading

=== Arriva North East ===
- X1 - Darlington to Crook via Bishop Auckland, removed from the MAX brand with buses now carrying the Arriva logo in its place.
- X67 - Darlington to Middlesbrough, withdrawn and replaced with revised route X66.
- X93/X94 - Middlesbrough to Scarborough via Whitby, removed from the MAX brand following refurbishment and rebrand of existing vehicles and is now a part of the sapphire brand. However this was an accident, as when Arriva north east uprgraded the buses on the route with the newer Max livery which was the same as the newer Sapphire livery, Arriva accidentally ordered Sapphire branded e-leather instead of Max branded e-leather and due to the Max and Sapphire brands having identical newer livery, Arriva chose to upgrade the routes to be under the Sapphire brand instead of ordered Max branded e-leather.

=== Arriva Northumbria ===
- X7/X8 - Newcastle to Blyth via Quorum Business Park, removed from the MAX brand with buses now carrying the Arriva logo in its place.
- X9/X10/X11 - Newcastle to Blyth via Cramlington, removed from the MAX brand with buses now carrying the Arriva logo in its place.
- X14 - Newcastle to Thropton via Morpeth, removed from the MAX brand following delivery of new buses in the standard livery.
- X15/X18 - Newcastle to Berwick via Morpeth and Alnwick, removed from the MAX brand following delivery of new buses in the standard livery.
- X16 - Newcastle to Kirkhill Estate via Morpeth, withdrawn and replaced in part by an extended route 2.
- X20 - Newcastle to Alnwick via Ashington, removed from the MAX brand following delivery of new buses in the standard livery.
- 308 - Newcastle to Blyth, following a change in vehicle allocation, the initial vehicles (Wright Gemini 2-bodied Volvo B5LHs) were transferred to Arriva Yorkshire, in return for unrefurbished Wright Gemini 2-bodied VDL DB300s which were later refurbished to the new standard Arriva livery and specification.

=== Arriva Yorkshire ===
- 415 - York to Selby, upgraded to Arriva Sapphire.
- 229 - Leeds to Huddersfield, upgraded to Arriva Sapphire.
- 444 - Leeds to Wakefield
- 268 /268A - Wakefield/Dewsbury to Bradford

== Vehicles ==
Max branded vehicles had leather seats, free WiFi and a modified livery, some also include charging points (standard from early-2016), furthermore some buses also include air conditioning. Initially only refurbished vehicles were used with Arriva North East and Arriva Yorkshire opting for Wright Gemini 2 bodied VDL DB300s.

Since then, Arriva North East had also refurbished Scania OmniCitys and Alexander Dennis Enviro400s and more recently had purchased brand new stock in the form of further Alexander Dennis Enviro400s, Wright StreetLites and Volvo B9TLs. Meanwhile, Arriva Yorkshire had refurbished a mixture of Wright Gemini 2/VDL DB300s and Alexander Dennis Enviro400s as well as purchasing new Alexander Dennis Enviro400s. Elsewhere, Arriva Herts & Essex had refurbished Mercedes-Benz Citaros while Arriva Buses Wales had refurbished Wright Pulsar bodied VDL SB200s.

== See also ==
- Arriva Sapphire
- Stagecoach Gold
