= Arriva Sapphire =

Brand of bus services

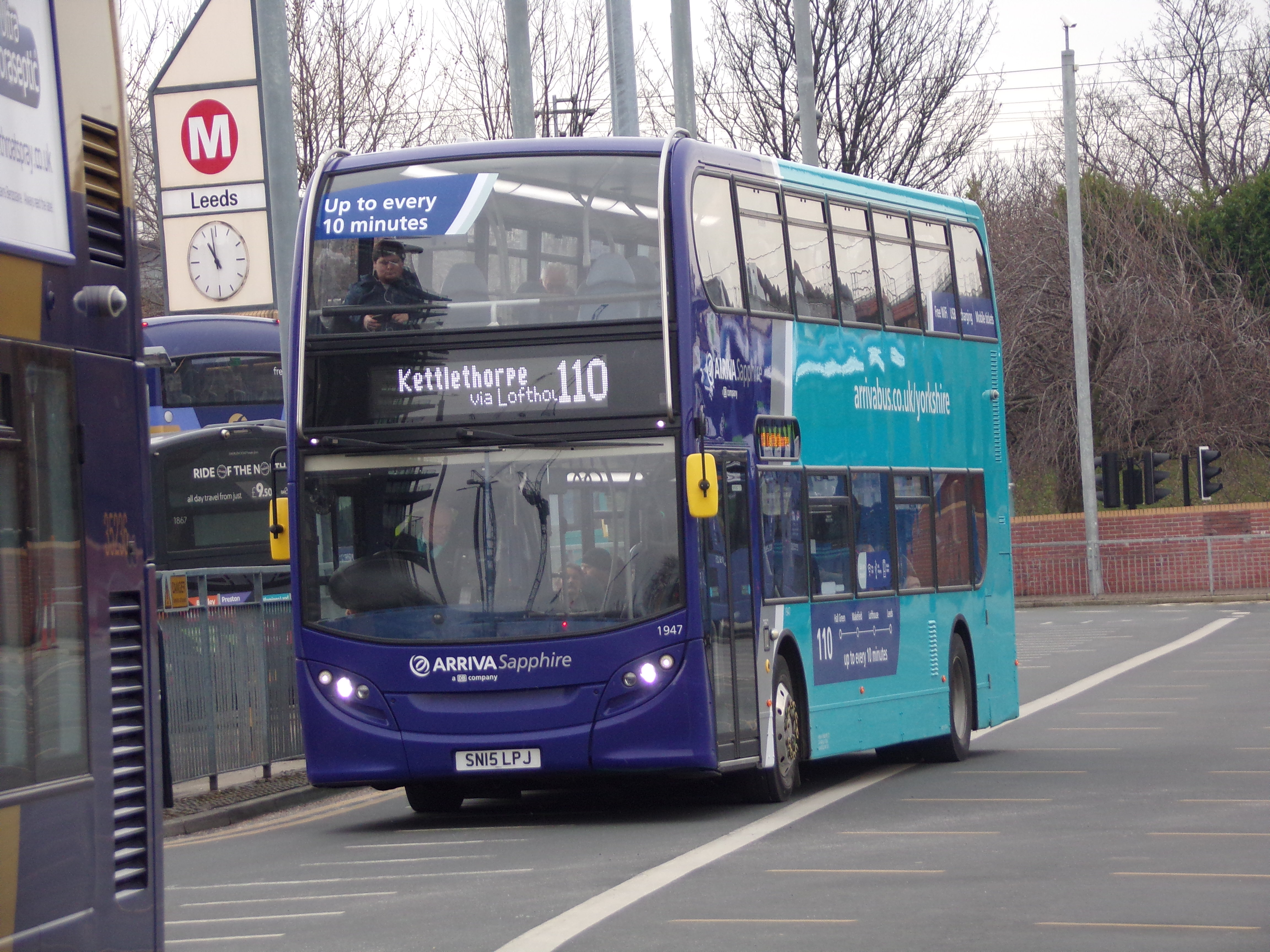
- Arriva Yorkshire Alexander Dennis Enviro400 in Leeds in February 2018
- Parent: Arriva
- Founded: April 2013
- Service type: Luxury bus
- Routes: 10 (October 2025)
- Operator: Arriva Buses Wales; Arriva Midlands; Arriva North East; Arriva North West; Arriva Shires & Essex; Arriva Southern Counties; Arriva Yorkshire
- Website: Website

Arriva Sapphire is a luxury brand used by various Arriva bus subsidiaries in the United Kingdom.

== History ==
Arriva Sapphire logo used 2013–17

Arriva Sapphire logo used in 2017

In February 2013, Arriva UK Bus announced that it would launch a Luxury service under the Sapphire brand for its bus services in the United Kingdom. It is similar to the Stagecoach Gold brand launched by Stagecoach Group in 2007.

Arriva initially launched the Sapphire brand on four pilot routes:

- Arriva Buses Wales' route 1 Wrexham to Chester
- Arriva Midlands' route 31/31a Oadby to Leicester this route now uses any vehicles
- Arriva North East's route 7 Darlington to Durham
- Arriva Shires & Essex's route 280 Aylesbury to Oxford

In 2014, the brand was extended to 11 more routes with another six scheduled for conversion in late 2015.

In 2017, Arriva Sapphire was rebranded with a new logo and livery in line with the switchover to the new Arriva brand. The logo was given another update in 2018 to include the company's new corporate identity.

In 2019, Arriva Midlands routes 1, 2, 2E running between Walsall and Cannock/Huntington were downgraded to regular buses after six years of Sapphire. Further routes across the country have since been withdrawn or removed from the Sapphire brand.

In 2022, Arriva started to phase out the Sapphire brand nationally, with the majority of buses being repainted into the standard Arriva livery or replaced with new buses.

== Routes ==
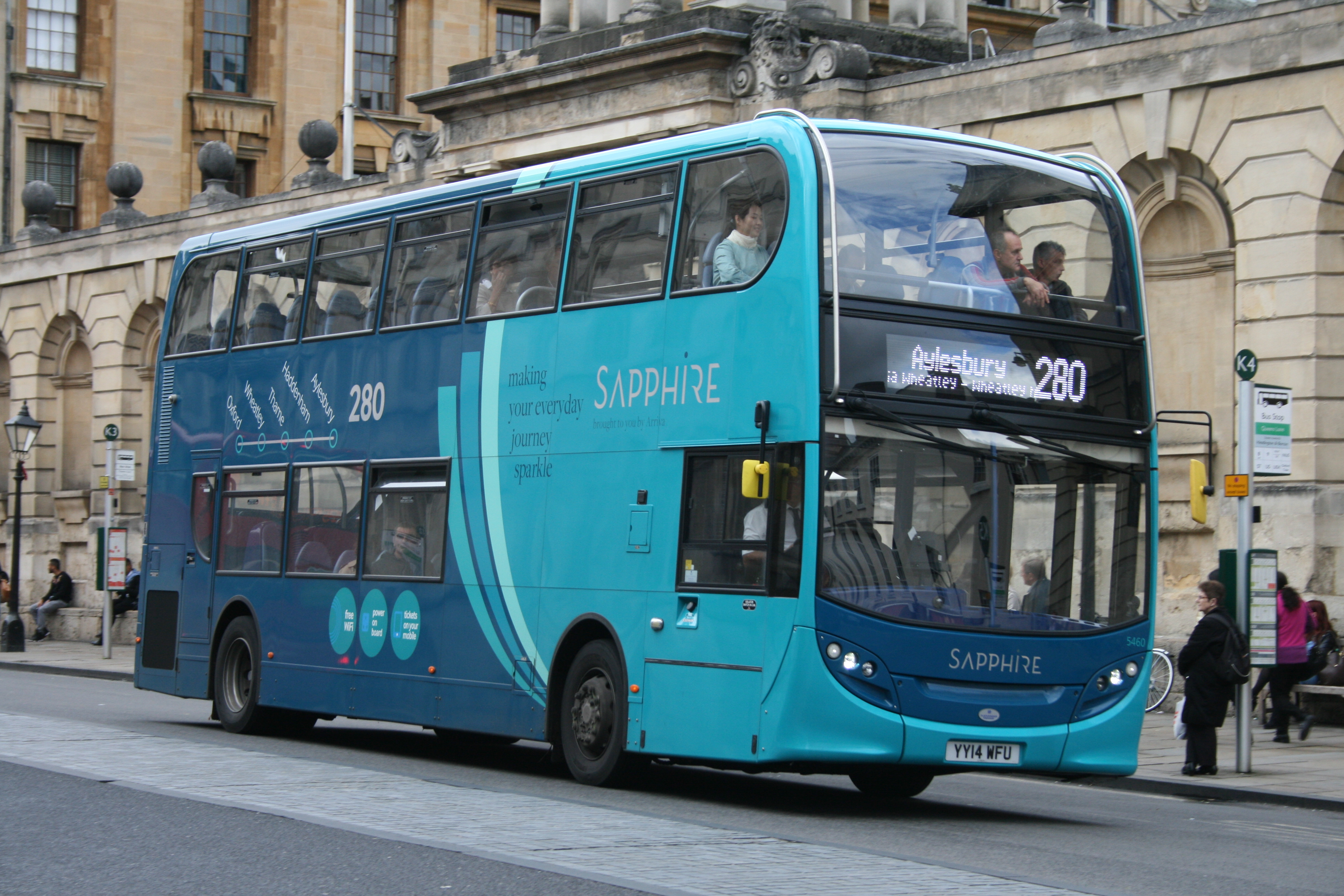
2013—17 Sapphire-liveried Alexander Dennis Enviro400 in October 2014

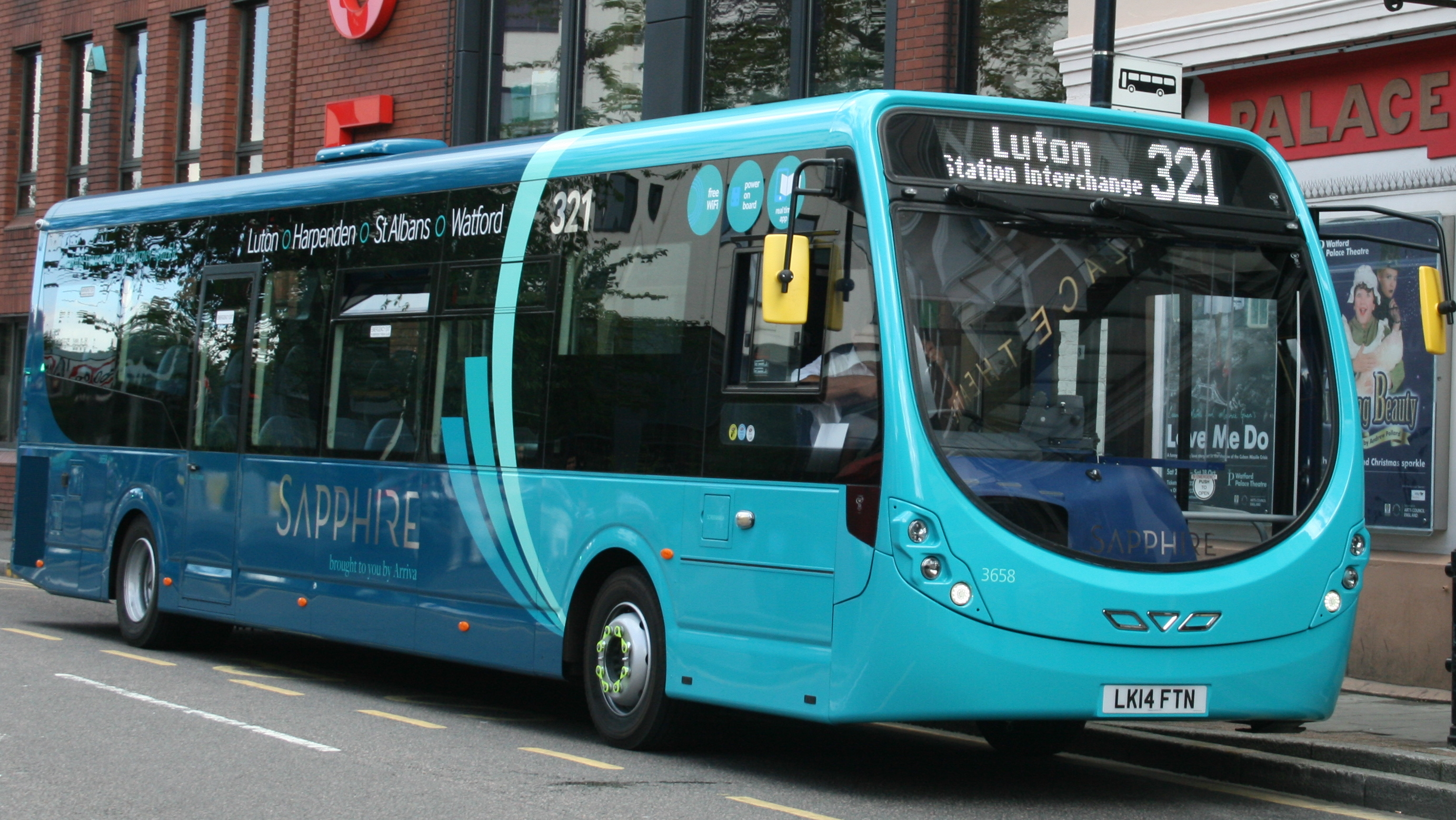
2013—17 Sapphire-liveried Wright StreetLite in August 2014

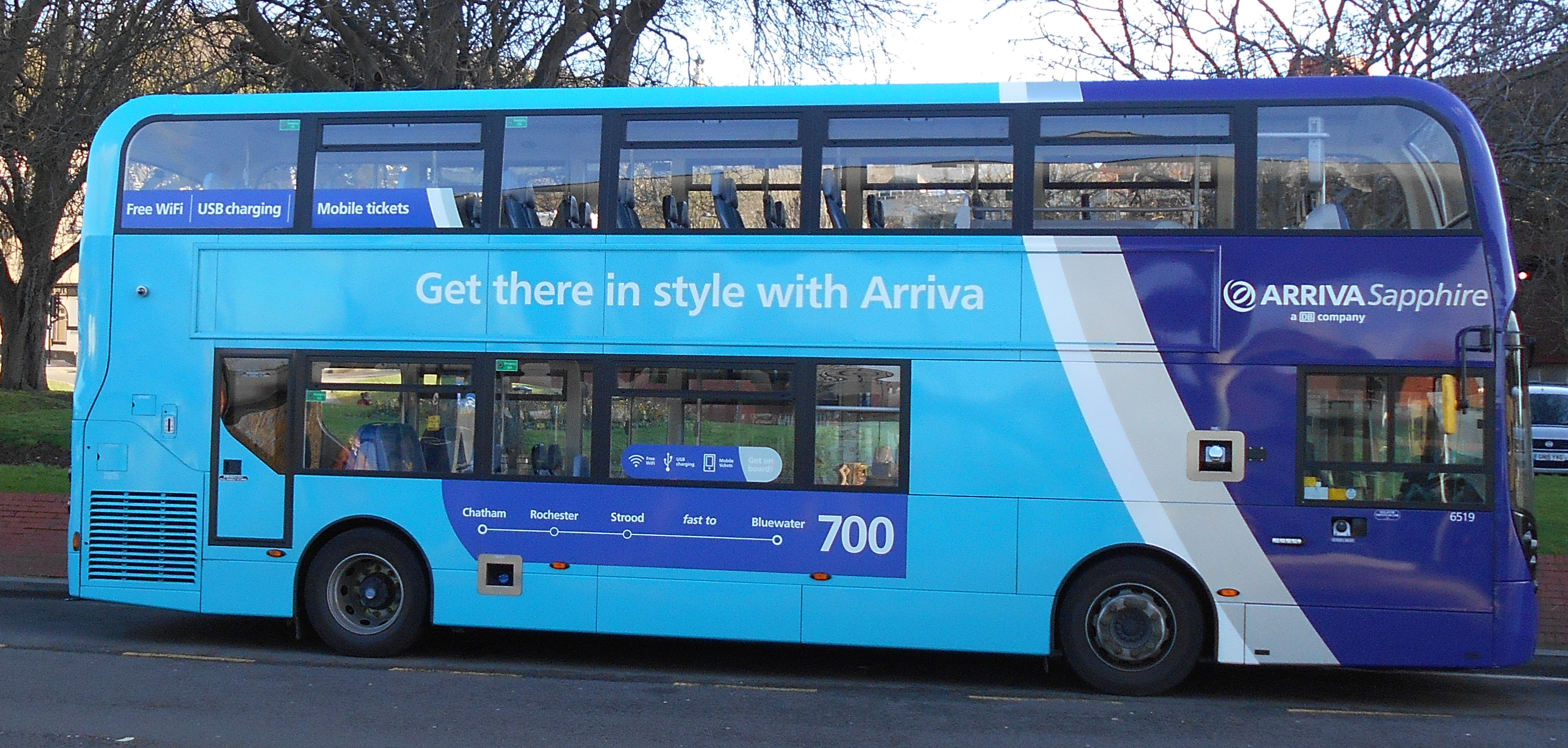
2017— Sapphire-liveried Alexander Dennis Enviro400 MMC in January 2018

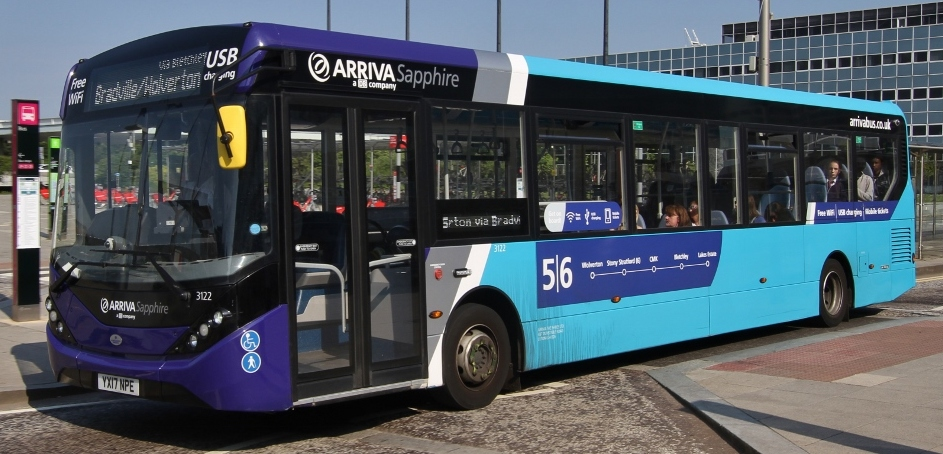
2017— Sapphire-liveried Alexander Dennis Enviro200 MMC in May 2018

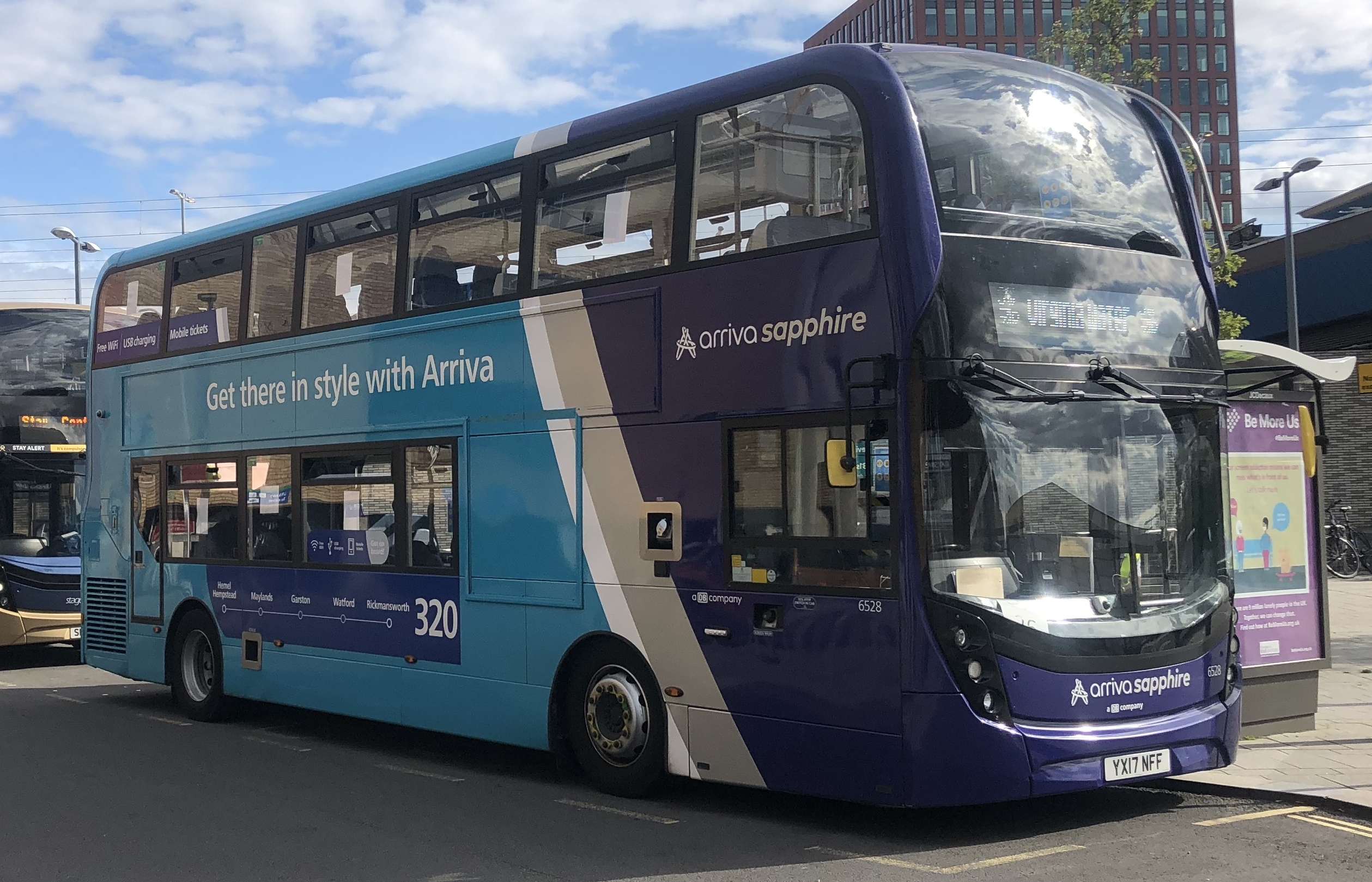
2017— Sapphire-liveried Alexander Dennis Enviro400 MMC (with rebranded Arriva logo) in July 2020

As of October 2025, there were 10 Arriva Sapphire routes.

Service no.	Route start	Route end
Arriva Buses Wales
1	Wrexham	Chester
Arriva Shires & Essex
5/6	Lakes Estate	Wolverton
Arriva Southern Counties
480	Gravesend	Temple Hill
490/491	Gravesend	Singlewell/Riverview Park
Arriva Yorkshire
163	Leeds	Castleford
168	Leeds	Castleford
229	Leeds	Huddersfield
415	York	Selby

=== Former services ===
Service no.	Route start	Route end	Notes
Arriva Buses Wales
12/X12	Rhyl	Llandudno	Route removed from the Sapphire brand in 2022, with the repaint of existing buses into standard livery.
10/10A	Connah's Quay	Chester	Route removed from the Sapphire brand in 2024, with the repaint of existing buses into standard livery, as well as being transferred to Arriva Merseyside.
Arriva North East
1/5/5A	Darlington	Bishop Auckland/Crook/Tow Law	Route removed from the Sapphire brand in 2024, any vehicle operates this route now, buses have also been debranded.
3/X3/X3A/X4	Middlesbrough	Lingdale/Skelton/Loftus/Whitby	Route removed from the Sapphire brand, with the allocation now formed of buses in various liveries and specifications.
5/5A	Middlesbrough	Easington	Route removed from the Sapphire brand in 2022, with the repaint of existing buses into standard livery.
6	Durham	Bishop Auckland/Cockfield	Route removed from the Sapphire brand in 2022, with the repaint of existing buses into standard livery.
7	Durham	Darlington	Route removed from the Sapphire brand, with the allocation now formed of buses in various liveries and specifications.
22	Durham	Sunderland	Route removed from the Sapphire brand in 2022, with the repaint of existing buses into standard livery.
23	Hartlepool	Sunderland	Route removed from the Sapphire brand in 2022, with the repaint of existing buses into standard livery.
24	Hartlepool	Durham	Route removed from the Sapphire brand in 2022, with the repaint of existing buses into standard livery.
X21/X22	Newbiggin	Newcastle	Routes removed from the Sapphire brand in 2022, with the introduction of new buses and repaint of existing buses into standard livery.
43	Morpeth	Newcastle	Route removed from the Sapphire brand, with the allocation now formed of buses in various liveries and specifications.
44/45	Dinnington	Newcastle	Routes removed from the Sapphire brand, with the allocation now formed of buses in various liveries and specifications.
Arriva North West
38	Crewe	Macclesfield	Arriva North West ceased operating service in April 2023, route now operated by D&G Bus
362	Wigan	Chorley	Arriva North West ceased operating the route in September 2023, now operated by Go North West under the Bee Network franchising system. Buses branded for this route were transferred to Wythenshawe Depot and Hemel Hempstead, and can be seen operating various Arriva routes in South Manchester and Hertfordshire.
575	Wigan	Bolton	Arriva North West ceased operating the route in September 2023, now operated by Go North West under the Bee Network franchising system. Buses branded for this route were transferred to Wythenshawe Depot and Hemel Hempstead, and can be seen operating various Arriva routes in South Manchester and Hertfordshire.
263	Manchester	Altrincham	Route effectively removed from the Sapphire brand in September 2023, with existing buses being withdrawn from service and replaced by a variety of Sapphire and non-Sapphire buses cascaded from Bolton Depot, which has been shut down due to the introduction of the Bee Network.
Arriva Yorkshire
166	Leeds	Castleford	Route withdrawn and replaced in part by revised routes 163 and 164.
167	Leeds	Castleford	Route withdrawn and replaced in part by revised route 168.
110	Leeds	Wakefield	Route removed from the Sapphire brand, with the allocation now formed of buses in various liveries and specifications.
168	Leeds	Castleford	Route removed from the Sapphire brand, with the allocation now formed of buses in various liveries and specifications.
231/232	Wakefield	Huddersfield	Route removed from the Sapphire brand, with the allocation now formed of buses in various liveries and specifications.
Arriva Midlands
31/31A/31E	Leicester	Oadby	Services 31/31E now operated by standard buses. Service 31A was ceased in March 2020 until January 2023 when it was reinstated
X3	Leicester	Market Harborough	Frequency reduced and Sapphire buses moved elsewhere in 2021.
X84	Leicester	Rugby	Mainly being used on normal buses, however sometimes Sapphire branded buses are used.
38	Derby	Sinfin	Vehicles repainted into standard Arriva livery in early 2022.
110	Tamworth	Birmingham	Route removed from the Sapphire brand in 2022, with the repaint of existing buses into standard livery.
158	Leicester	Hinckley/Nuneaton	Vehicles are being repainted from January 2023.
Arriva The Shires
133	Colchester	Stansted Airport	Withdrawn on the 1st of June 2025.
320	Hemel Hempstead	Rickmansworth	Withdrawn on 17 April 2022 and replaced by new route 20 and extended route 321.
321	Luton	Watford	Buses repainted into Arriva Standard Livery throughout 2021 and route declassified.
280	Aylesbury	Oxford	Route replaced by routes X7 and X8.
X7/X8	Aylesbury	Oxford	Routes withdrawn in July 2024.
Arriva Southern Counties
101	Gillingham	Maidstone	Buses repainted into Arriva Journey Mark.
470	Gravesend	Dartford	Route withdrawn and replaced by the revised route 480
480A	Gravesend	Riverview Park	Route renumbered to 491
490A	Gravesend	Singlewell	Route renumbered to 490
700	Bluewater	Chatham	Buses repainted into Arriva Journey Mark, route now uses any suitable vehicle.

== Vehicles ==
Buses have leather seats, free WiFi, power ports, and a modified two tone blue livery. The initial pilot routes commenced with a mix of refurbished double deck buses and new Wright Pulsar bodied VDL SB200s. Mostly since then, new buses had been purchased, primarily Alexander Dennis Enviro400s, Wright StreetLites and Wright StreetDecks. A number of Wright Pulsar/Pulsar 2 vehicles had been refurbished to operate Sapphire routes. In 2020 a selection of Optare Versas in Yorkshire were repainted into the new Arriva Sapphire livery.

== See also ==
- Arriva Max
