= Banga Buses =

Bus company in Wolverhampton, England

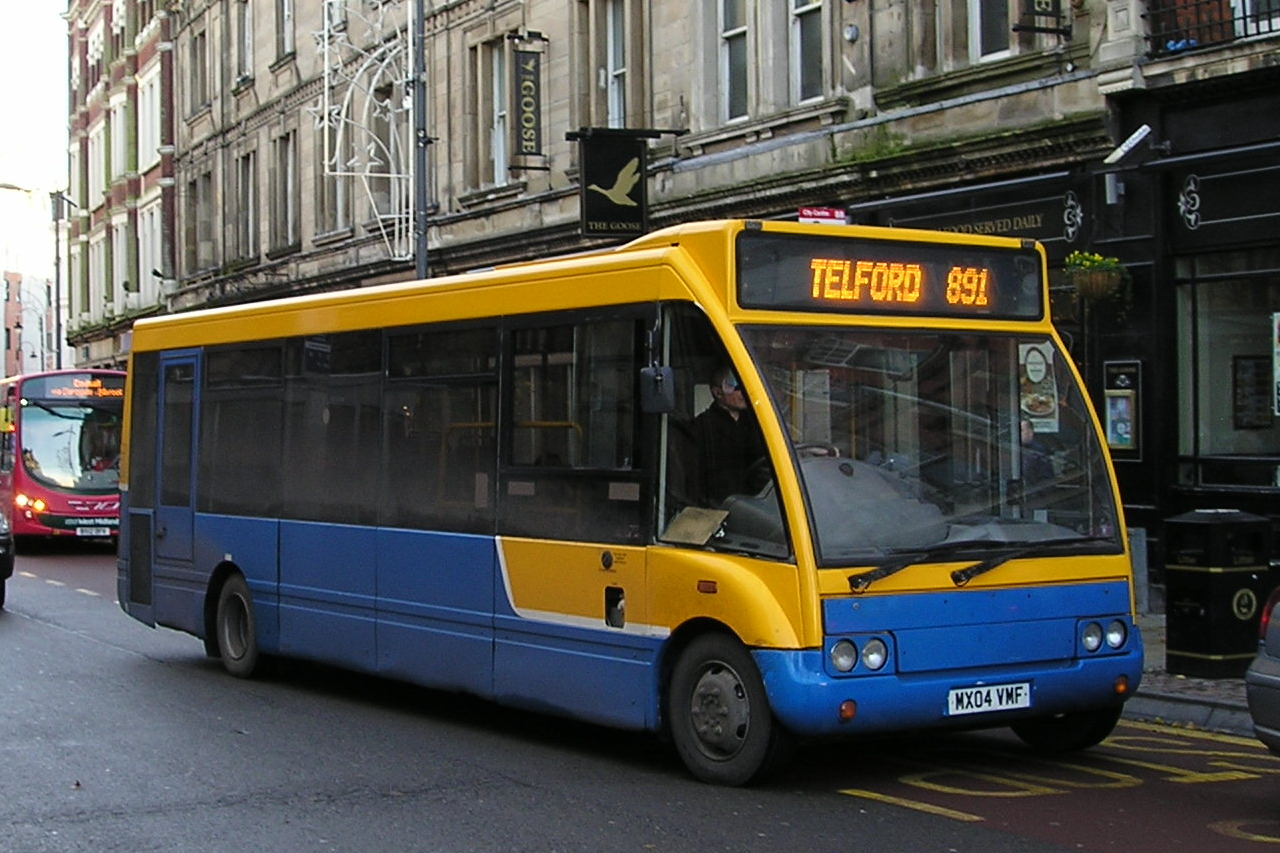
- Banga Buses MX04VMF in Wolverhampton (2016)
- Parent: Rajinder Banga
- Headquarters: Blakenhall, Wolverhampton
- Service area: Wolverhampton, Dudley, Telford
- Service type: Bus services
- Routes: 4
- Fleet: 12
- Website: bangabuses.co.uk

Banga Buses is a bus company based in Wolverhampton, West Midlands, England.

== Services ==
Banga Buses operates four main services around Wolverhampton, two of which are under contract to Transport for West Midlands and two partly commercially operated. Banga expanded one of its routes' hours of operations in April 2019 when West Midlands Special Needs Transport collapsed.

In 2022, Banga Buses participated in the Birmingham Commonwealth Games transportation initiative, offering free travel to ticket holders as part of a regional effort to promote public transport during the event.

== Fares ==
In January 2023, Banga Buses participated in the national £2 single bus fare cap scheme, introduced by the UK government to encourage bus use and help with the rising cost of living. The scheme, which applied across England, meant passengers could travel on any eligible single journey for a maximum fare of £2. The fare cap was initially intended to run until March 2023 but was later extended. Banga Buses was among the operators in the West Midlands to offer capped fares under this initiative.

== Fleet ==
The current fleet consists of Alexander Dennis Enviro200s, Optare Solos and Wright Streetlites.

== Criticism ==
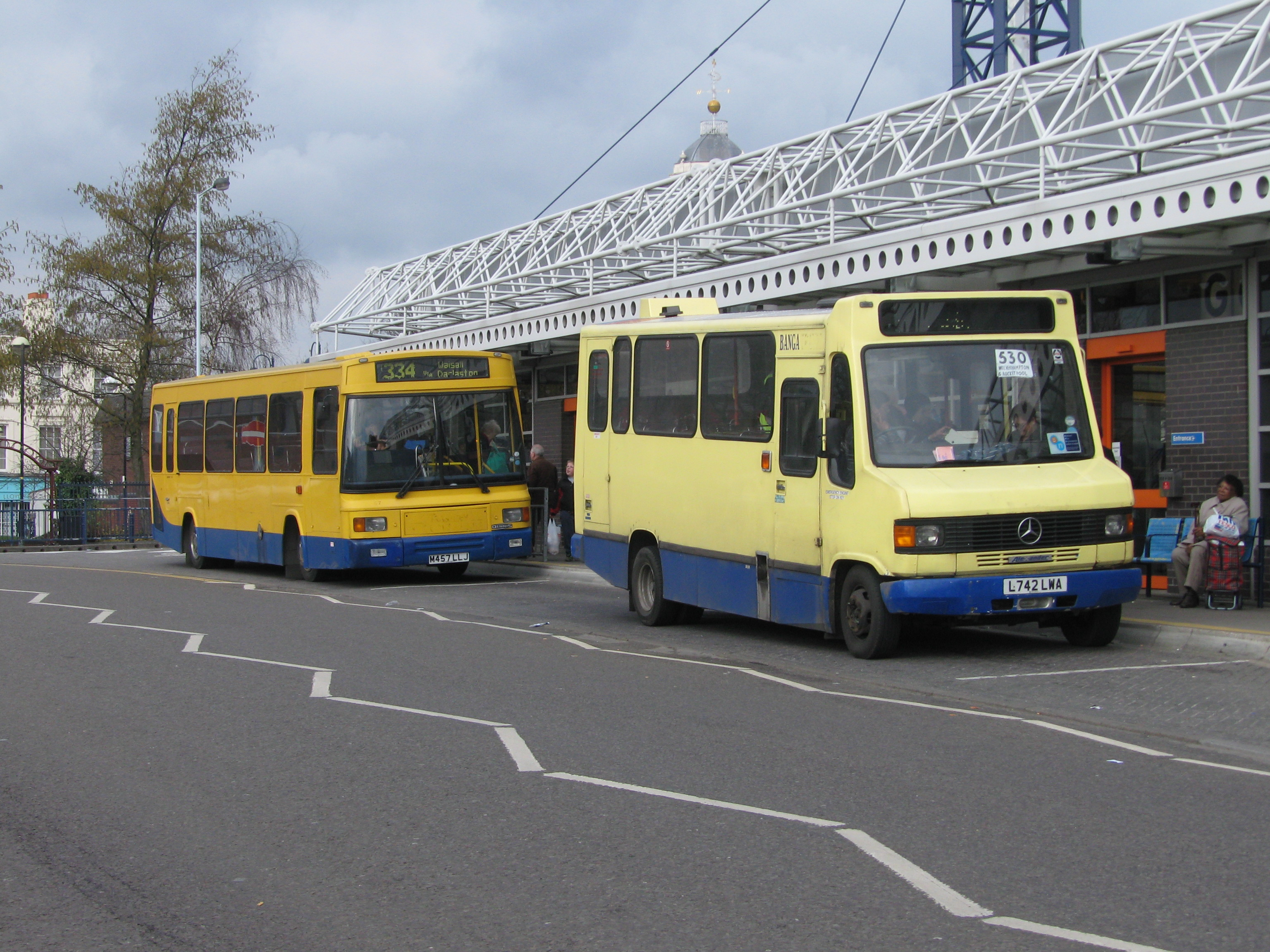
A Banga Buses vehicle from the pre-2010 fleet

The company came under fire in December 2006 when the company, then Banga Travel, suffered several vehicle fires, with the operating licence removed. This decision was stayed, with operations allowed to continue. In 2008, Rajinder Banga, applied for a brand new operating licence under his name and the Banga Buses brand, however this was denied by the Traffic Commissioners. Eventually this decision was reversed in 2009.

In 2016, the company was called to Public Inquiry following an unsatisfactory maintenance investigation. Nick Jones, the Traffic Commissioner, Jones curtailed the O-licence from 13 to 12 vehicles for the month of April 2016. A further curtailment occurred in 2025 from 12 to 10 over 4 weekends of 2025 for similar reasons

== See also ==
- List of bus operators of the United Kingdom
