= Arriva Yorkshire =

Bus operator in Yorkshire, England

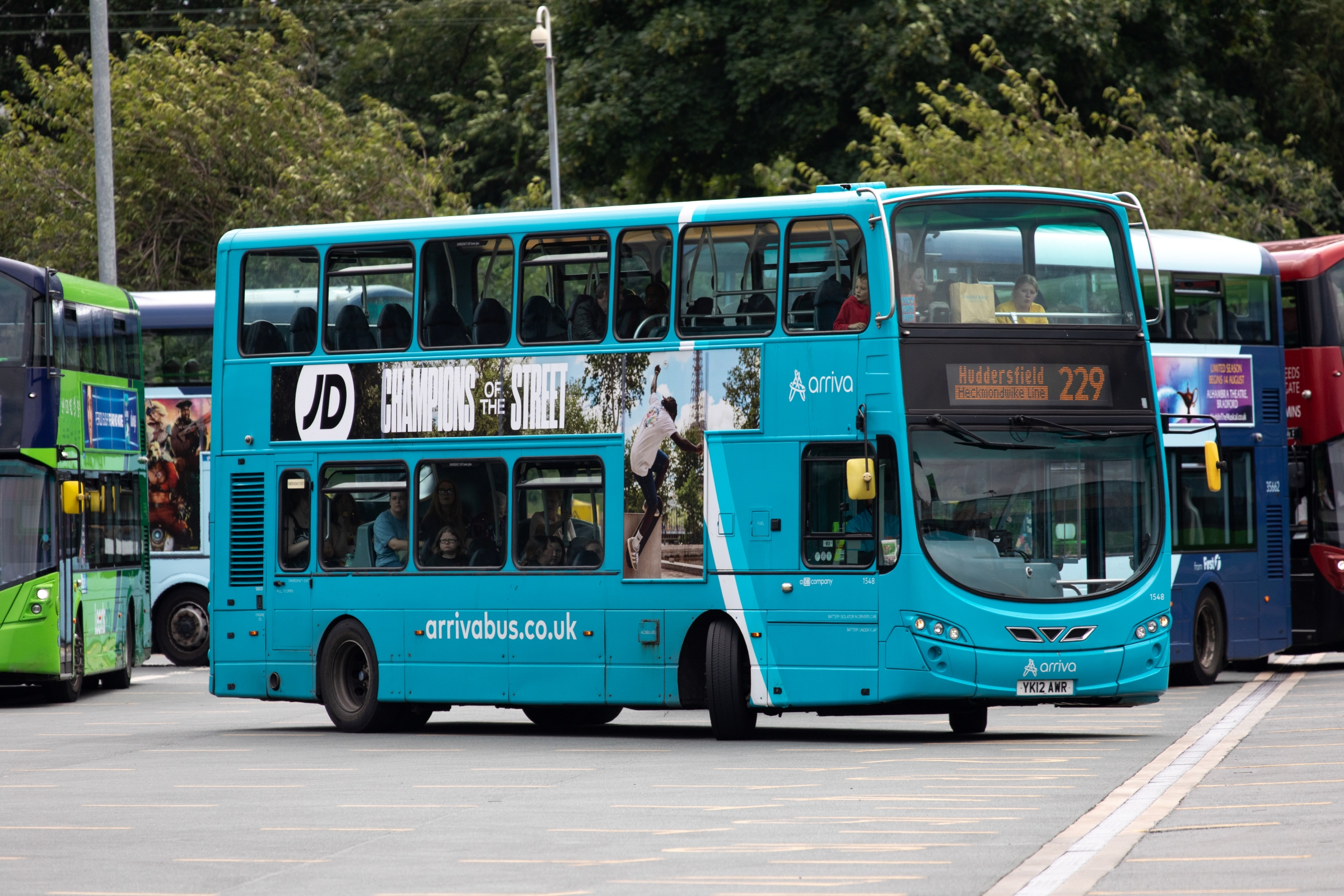
- Wright Gemini 2 bodied VDL DB300 at Leeds City bus station in July 2024
- Parent: Arriva UK Bus
- Founded: 1997; 29 years ago
- Headquarters: Wakefield
- Service area: West Yorkshire; South Yorkshire; Parts of the East Riding of Yorkshire and North Yorkshire
- Routes: 81
- Depots: 5
- Fleet: 317 (January 2026)
- Website: www.arrivabus.co.uk/Yorkshire

Arriva Yorkshire is a major bus operator providing services primarily within and across West Yorkshire, although it also provides service in some parts of South Yorkshire, East Riding of Yorkshire and southern areas of North Yorkshire. It is a subsidiary of Arriva UK Bus.

== History ==
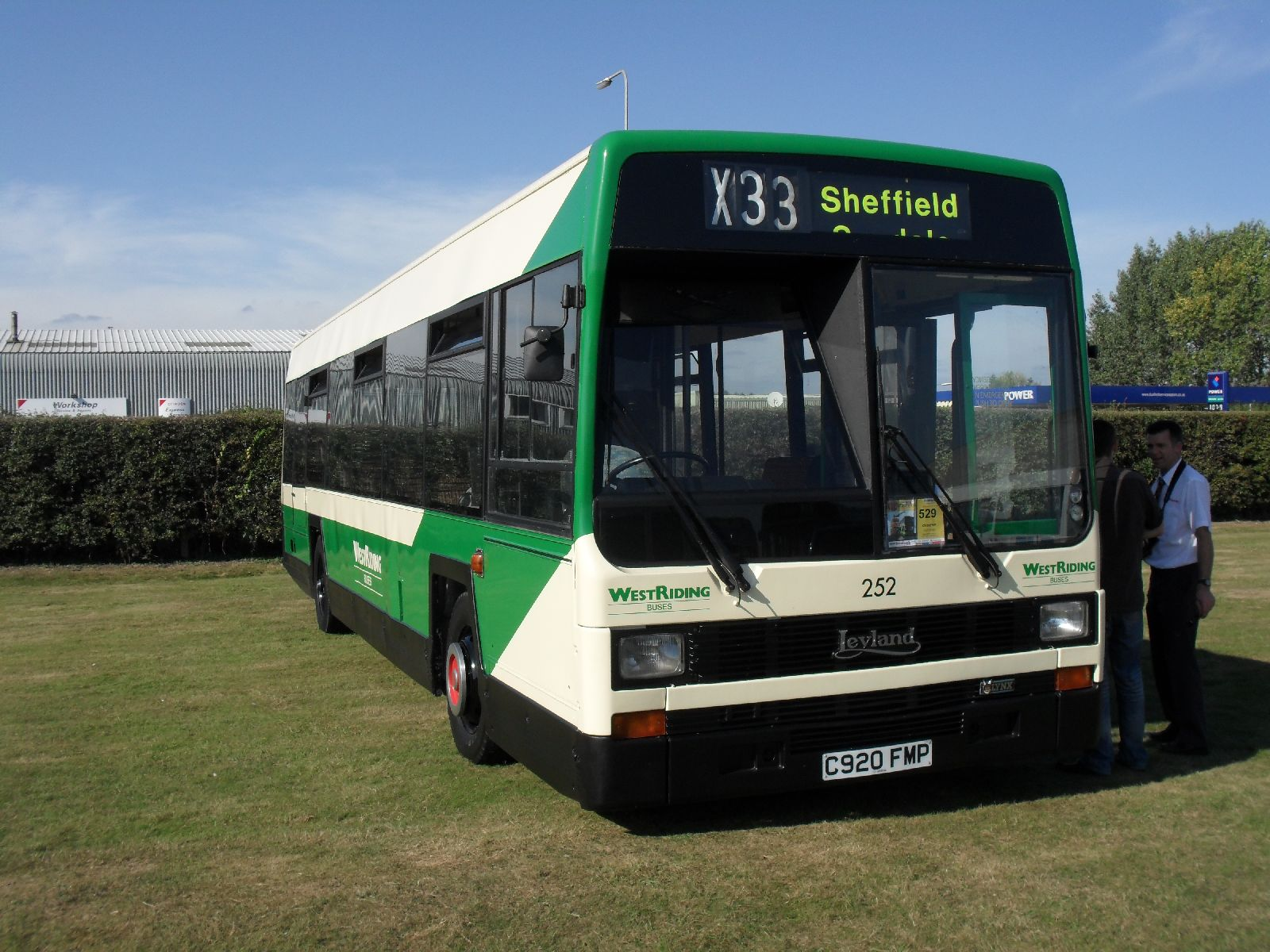
Preserved West Riding Buses Leyland Lynx in September 2009

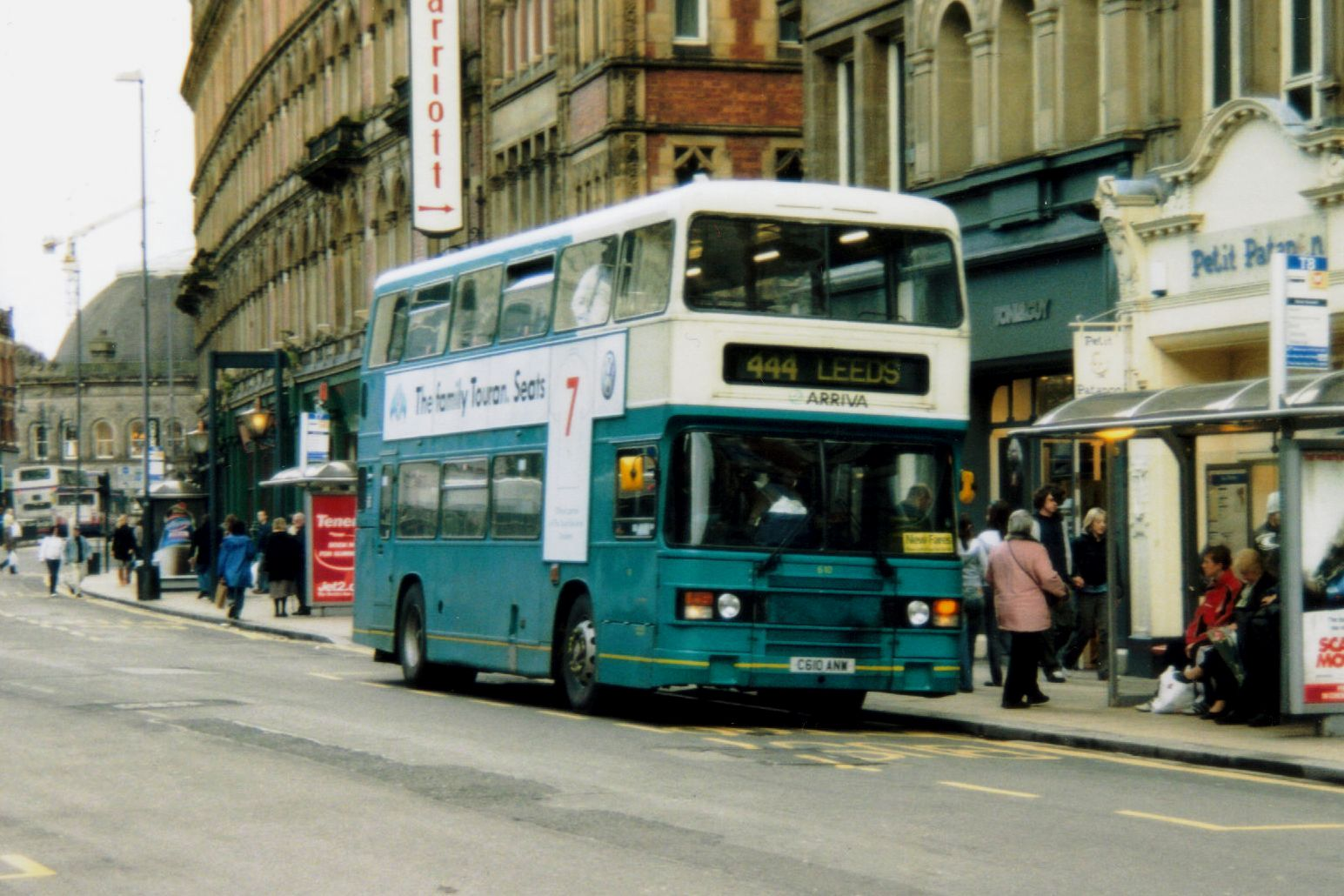
Eastern Coach Works bodied Leyland Olympian in Leeds in April 2006

Arriva Yorkshire was formed as a combination of mergers of previous companies based in West and North Yorkshire.

In 1904 Yorkshire (West Riding) Electric Tramways began operating tram services in Wakefield followed in 1906 by Castleford. In November 1923 the West Riding Automobile Company began operating bus services in West Riding. Yorkshire Woollen District Transport, meanwhile, operated services around Dewsbury.

Both companies were acquired by the National Bus Company, along with Selby & District with the companies maintaining separate identities. In 1987 West Riding Automobile and Yorkshire Woollen District were sold in a management buyout to Caldaire, under whose ownership they traded as West Riding Buses and Yorkshire Buses respectively. In 1994 South Yorkshire Road Transport, based in Pontefract, was purchased. The four companies were taken over by British Bus in 1995 which itself was purchased by Cowie Group in August 1996. All were rebranded under the Arriva brand in 1997.

From May 2008 until July 2021, there was a sister company in Huddersfield. Centrebus Holdings, in which Arriva held a 40% stake, was formed when the Huddersfield operations of Stagecoach Yorkshire was purchased along with the separate K-Line bus company. In September 2013, Arriva took full ownership of Centrebus Holdings and K-Line with the former rebranded Yorkshire Tiger and the latter as Tiger Blue. When Yorkshire Tiger was sold to Transdev Blazefield, routes 231 and 232 were not included and transferred to Arriva Yorkshire.

In May 2022, 650 Unite the Union members working at Arriva Yorkshire depots voted in favour of indefinite strike action, beginning 6 June. Unite members were balloted on strike action following Arriva's offer of a 4.1% pay increase, which was below the 'real inflation rate' of 11.1%. No Arriva bus services operated in the region throughout the duration of the strike. Arriva Yorkshire apologised to customers for inconvenience caused by the strike, claiming their pay increase offer was "fair".

Bus services briefly resumed on 2 July 2022 – when the strike was suspended to allow union members to be balloted on an increased pay offer from Arriva, however the offer was rejected by 53.7% of union members, with the strike resuming on 13 July. Bus services would then resume two days later in what Unite called "an act of good faith" as the union began negotiations on a new pay offer from Arriva, promising 14 days notice of resumed strike action.

In September 2024, Arriva Yorkshire took emergency action to close its head office and depot in Wakefield after discovering the building was suffering serious structural problems. A majority of the site is planned to be demolished, with buses moving temporarily to Wakefield bus station and Arriva's Castleford, Dewsbury and Heckmondwike depots, while the subsidiary's staff have also relocated to Wakefield bus station.

== Brands ==
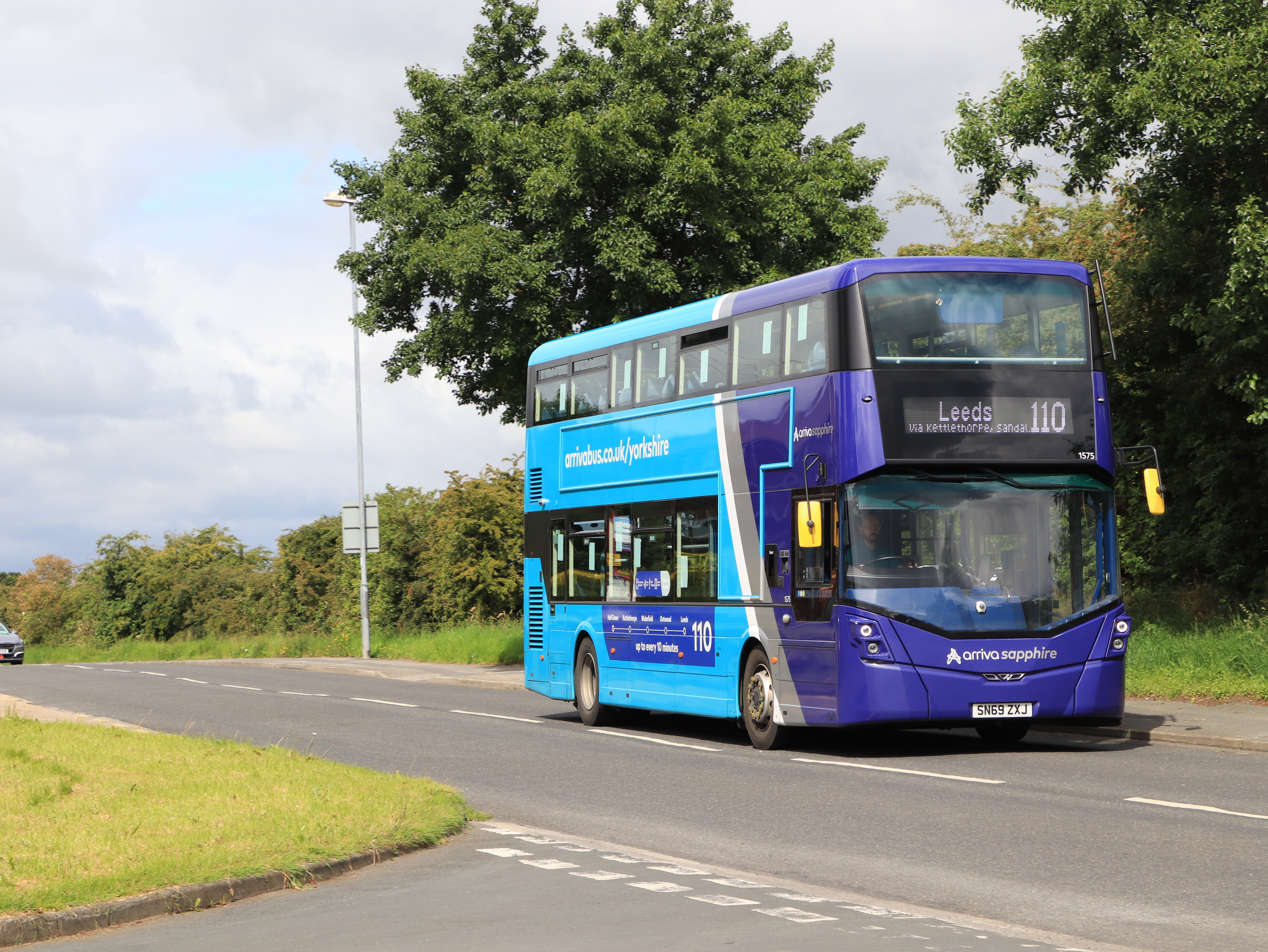
Sapphire branded Wright StreetDeck in Wakefield, July 2020

Arriva Yorkshire uses the Sapphire brand to differentiate premium services, with buses fitted with E-leather seats, free WiFi access, charging points, and audio-visual next stop announcements. Routes 110, from Wakefield to Leeds, 106, from Wakefield to Hall Green (audio-visual next stop only), 163 and 166, from Castleford to Leeds, 229, from Huddersfield to Leeds, 231 and 232, from Wakefield to Huddersfield, and route 415, from Selby to York, are branded Sapphire.

Arriva Yorkshire also formerly ran buses in Arriva Max branding, featuring similar premium features to Sapphire-branded buses. Services were also marketed as "Grand Yorkshire Connections", emphasising the larger network of branded routes. This branding was phased out as a result of the rebranding of the wider Arriva operation in 2017.

The third sub brand used by Arriva was the high-frequency Frequenta, formerly used on routes 148 and 149 between Wakefield, Pontefract and Knottingley, with services timetabled to run every 10 minutes.

== Controversies ==
A widely reported case in 2008 concerned a gothic couple, Dani Graves and his fiancée Tasha Maltby, who wears a dog collar and lead. A driver had refused them travel and made comments to them, allegedly saying: "We don't let freaks and dogs like you on." The company confirmed the couple were refused travel on two occasions due to "fears for passenger safety". In a statement the company addressed the issue, stating that the dog lead was potentially dangerous. Arriva also said they would be writing to Mr Graves "to apologise for any distress caused by the way this matter was handled".

In January 2017, a wheelchair user was denied access to a Arriva Yorkshire bus by the driver, because a pushchair was occupying the wheelchair space. The incident occurred days after the Supreme Court ruled that drivers should prioritise the space for wheelchair users.

== Fleet and depots ==
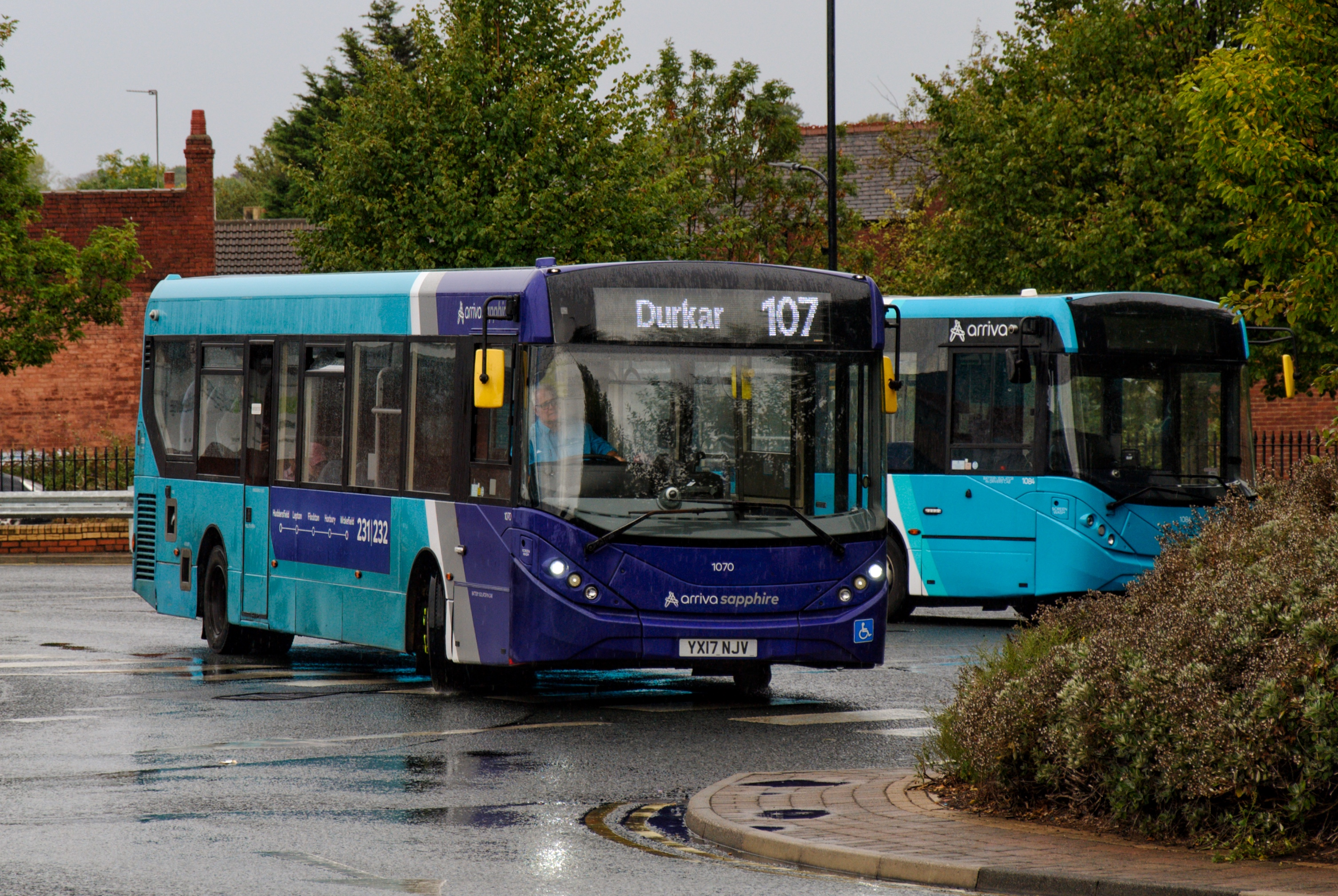
Two Arriva Yorkshire Alexander Dennis Enviro200 MMCs in Wakefield bus station in August 2025

As of January 2026, the Arriva Yorkshire fleet consisted of 317 buses.

Arriva Yorkshire operates buses from five depots in Castleford, Dewsbury, Heckmondwike, Selby, and a central depot in Belle Isle, Wakefield. This depot was initially closed in September 2024 due to 'serious structural problems' that required the building's demolition, with the overnight storage of the Wakefield fleet moved to other depots and nearby bus stations. The structural problems resulted in the West Yorkshire Combined Authority (WYCA) not proceeding with a nearly £8 million investment in 47 Alexander Dennis Enviro400EV battery electric buses at the depot, which had been funded through the central government's Zero Emission Bus Regional Areas 2 (ZEBRA2) scheme. In February 2026, the WYCA published proposals to build a new depot at Newton Bar, currently the site of a disused Wakefield Council highway maintenance depot, which is planned to accommodate up to 125 buses and support the charging of battery electric bus with overhead gantries.
