= Arriva UK Bus =

UK bus operating company

Arriva UK Bus Ltd
- Type: Subsidiary
- Industry: Public transport
- Headquarters: Sunderland, England
- Area served: United Kingdom
- Key people: Martijn Gilbert (managing director)
- Products: Bus services
- Owner: Arriva
- Number of employees: 35,000
- Website: www.arrivabus.co.uk

Arriva UK Bus is a major bus operator in the United Kingdom based in Sunderland, England. It is a subsidiary of Arriva which runs transport services across Europe, which was a subsidiary of Deutsche Bahn from 2010. In October 2023, Deutsche Bahn agreed terms to sell Arriva to I Squared Capital with the transaction completed in June 2024. This included Arriva UK Bus.

Arriva UK Bus operates 793 buses in the North East, North West, South East, Yorkshire & the Humber, West Midlands, East Midlands, Greater London and Wales. It employs 16,000 people.

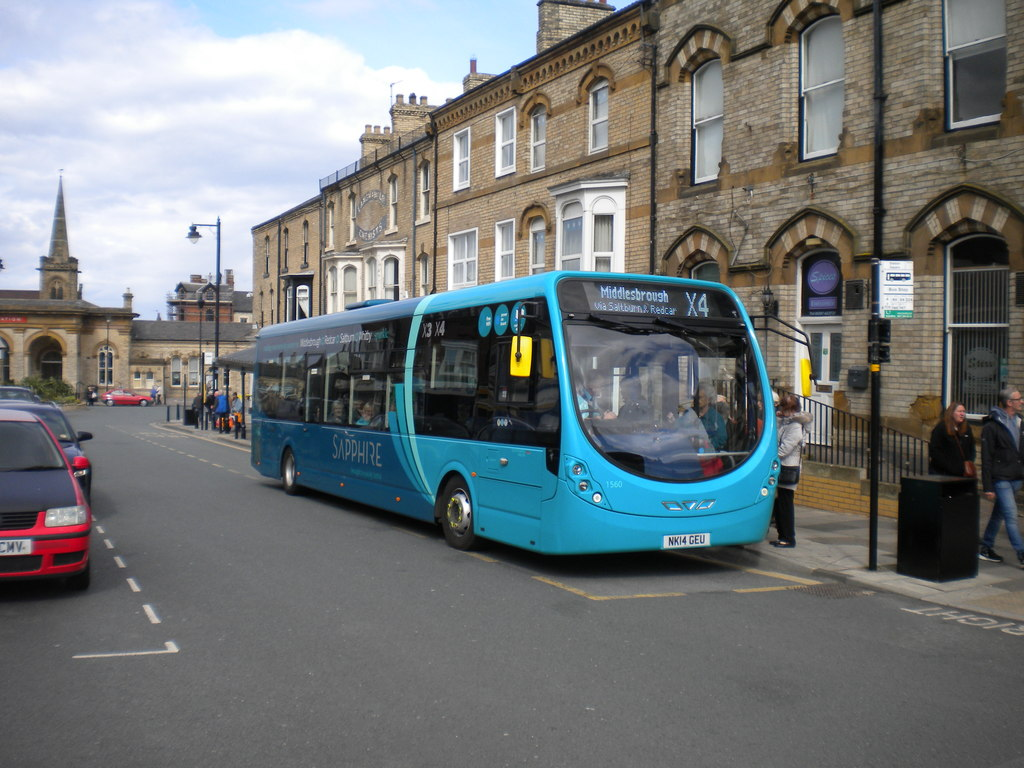
Sapphire branded Arriva North East Wright StreetLite in Saltburn in April 2017

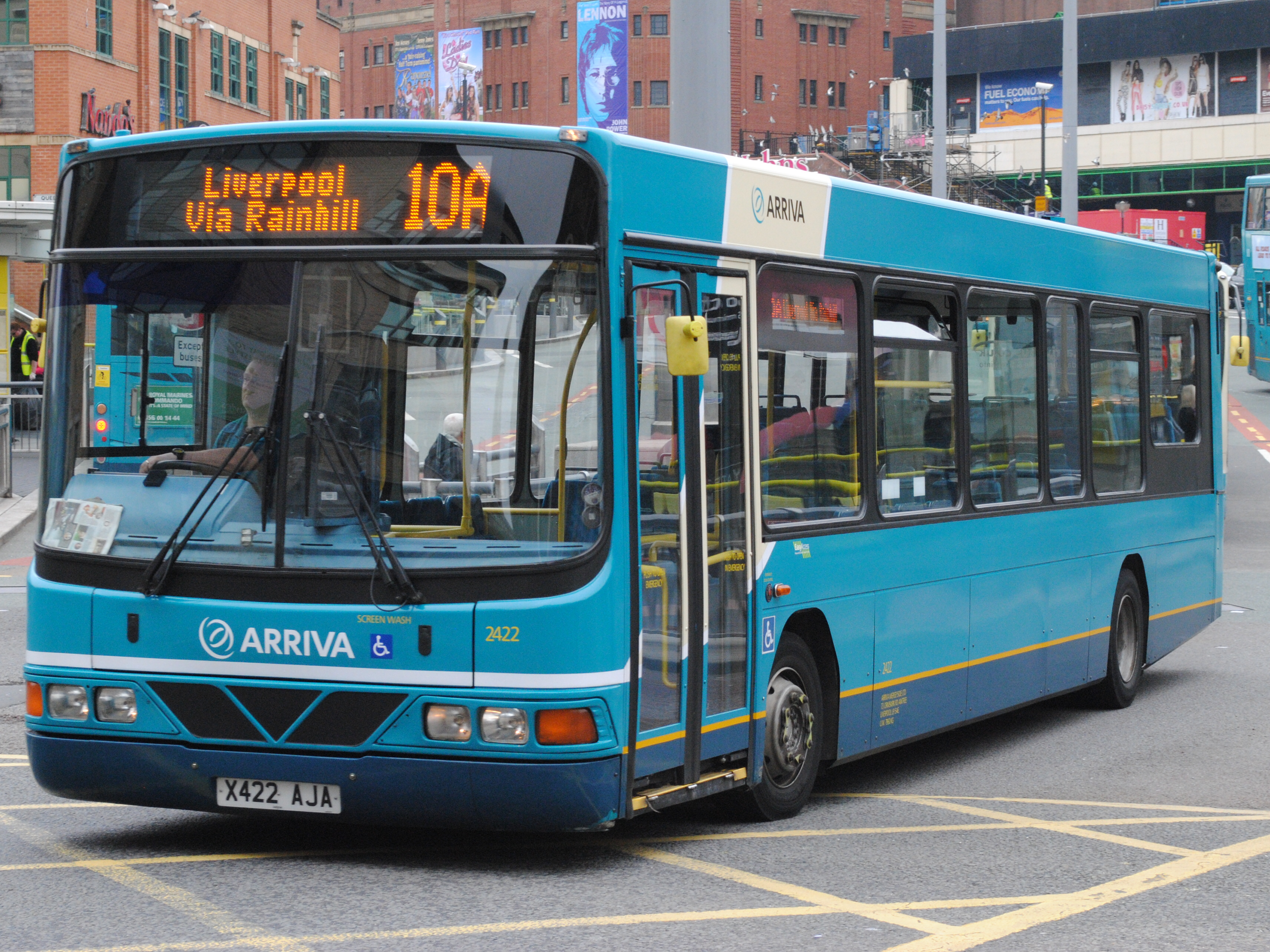
Arriva North West Wright Cadet bodied DAF SB120 in Liverpool in May 2013

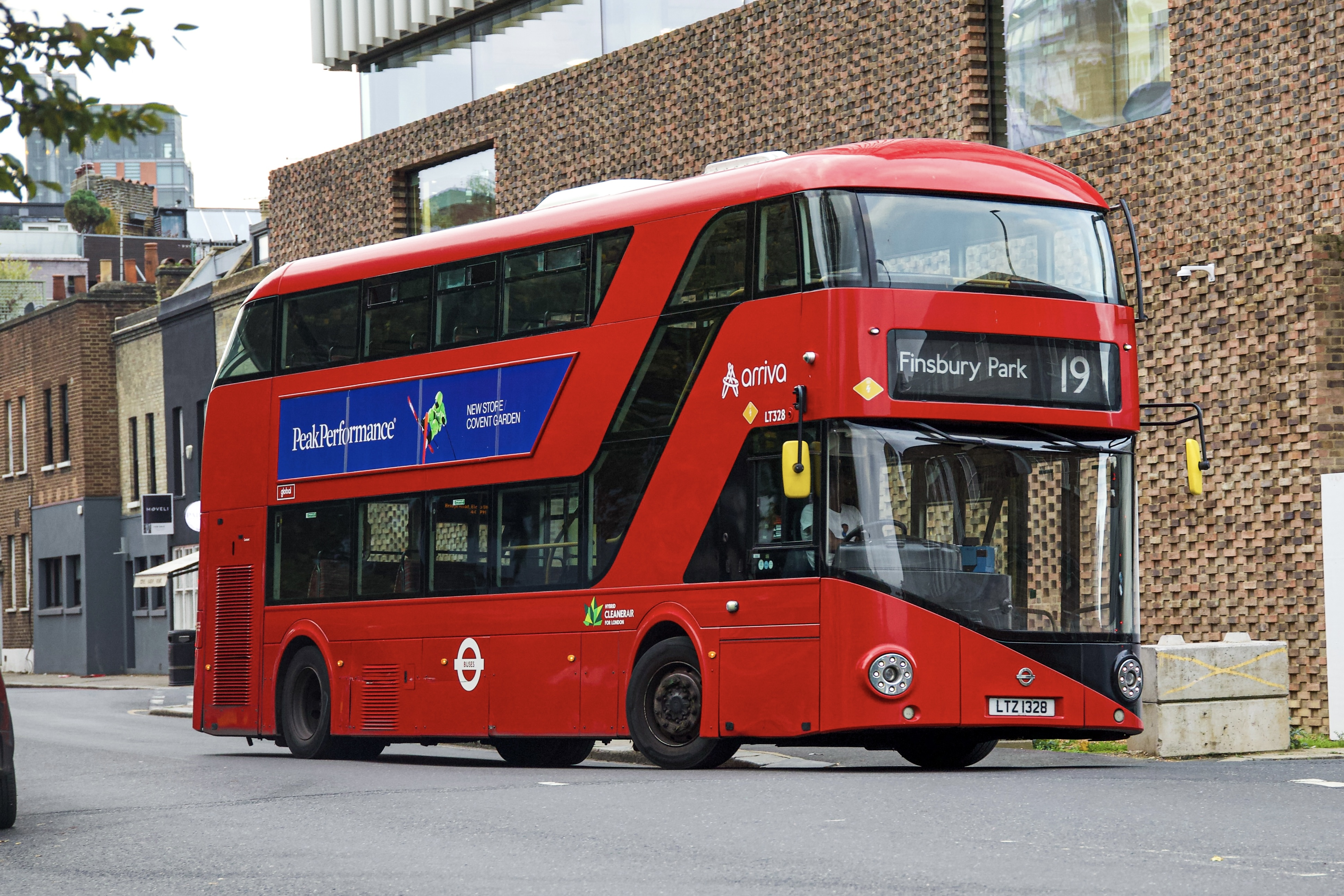
Arriva London New Routemaster in Battersea in October 2024

== Divisions ==
Arriva's bus network in the UK originates from its acquisition of Grey-Green in 1980 and British Bus in August 1996. It has the following operating units:

Network	Information
Arriva Buses Wales	Separated from Arriva North West & Wales in January 2009.
Arriva London	Arriva London North and South. Regulated by Transport for London.
Arriva Midlands	Arriva Derby, Arriva Midlands East and Arriva Midlands North
Arriva Herts & Essex	Bedfordshire, Buckinghamshire, Hertfordshire and Essex
Arriva Southern Counties	Arriva Colchester, Arriva Kent & Surrey, Arriva Kent Thameside, Arriva Southend
Arriva North East	Arriva Durham County & Arriva Northumbria. Originally included Arriva Teesside and Arriva Tees and District which were brought under the Durham County Division.
Arriva North West	Arriva Merseyside & Arriva North West
Arriva Yorkshire	All five Yorkshire based depots now operate under Arriva Yorkshire Limited
Green Line	Operates express coach services between London and the Home Counties

== Former divisions ==
- Wardle Transport (later including D&G Bus) sold to D&G Bus in 2015
- Arriva Scotland West sold to McGill's Bus Services in March 2012
- The Original Tour sold to RATP Group in September 2014
- Tellings-Golden Miller sold to management in 2016
- Yorkshire Tiger sold to Transdev Blazefield in 2021

== Branding ==
The current corporate livery is called "Journey Mark" and was initially rolled out on newly ordered vehicles from 2017 onwards. Older vehicles in non-current liveries were gradually updated on an as-needed basis. The base paint shade of light blue was darkened in 2026, with e-leather seats also being replaced with an updated moquette material, with buses gradually being refurbished over time.

Arriva London buses operating services for Transport for London are painted red. Yorkshire Tiger buses were painted in an orange livery and Tiger Blue blue. New Enterprise Coaches retains its existing white and red livery.

In some regions, premium services were operated under the Sapphire brand while interurban services were operated under the Max brand. In 2022, Arriva started to phase out the Sapphire and Max brand nationally, with the majority of buses being repainted into the standard Arriva livery or replaced with new buses.
