= Wakefield bus station =

Bus station in West Yorkshire, England

Wakefield
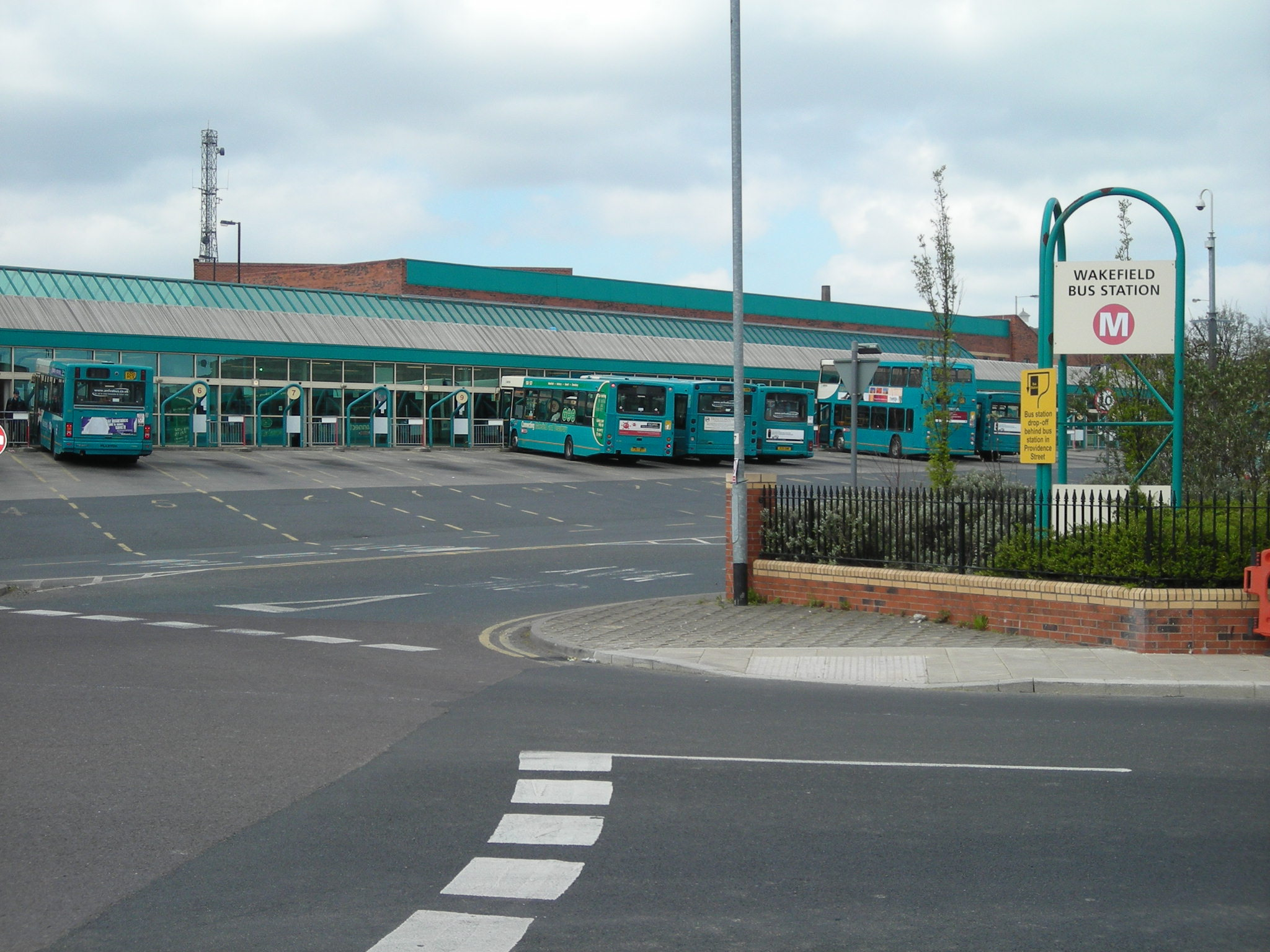

General information
- Location: Union Street, Wakefield; Wakefield (borough)
- Coordinates: 53.686°N 1.497°W
- Operator: Arriva Yorkshire
- Bus routes: 59, 59A, 96, 96B, 96C, 97, 100, 101, 102, 103, 104, 105, 105, 106, 107, 110, 111, 116, 118, 120, 120A, 122, 126, 147, 148, 149, 174, 175, 186, 189, 195, 195A, 196, 212, 231, 232, 232S, 268, 425, 444, 446, 485, 496, SW1, TK1, TK2, WF1, X1, WCB
- Bus stands: 24
- Bus operators: Arriva Yorkshire; Stagecoach Yorkshire; Team Pennine; Globe Holidays; Tetley's; Station Coaches
- Connections: Wakefield Westgate railway station; Wakefield Kirkgate railway station

History
- Opened: 25 September 2001
Location

Wakefield Bus Station serves the city of Wakefield, West Yorkshire, England. The bus station is owned and operated by Arriva Yorkshire. It is situated next to Marsh Way A61 and the city's new market and can be accessed from both Marsh Way and Union Street. It reopened on 25 September 2001 after being rebuilt with a main passenger concourse and 24 bus stands. In 2025, security was increased after multiple incidents of vandalism.

== Facilities ==
The bus station has 24 stances.

== Services ==
The main operators at the bus station are Arriva Yorkshire, Team Pennine and Stagecoach Yorkshire.

Buses run from the bus station around the Wakefield area and to the nearby towns and cities of Barnsley, Dewsbury, Leeds, Bradford, Huddersfield and Holmfirth.

The Wakefield freecitybus, operated by Tetley's connects the bus station with both the Wakefield Westgate and Kirkgate railway stations, as well as The Ridings Centre.

== See also ==
- Wakefield Westgate railway station
- Wakefield Kirkgate railway station
