= Wright StreetLite =

Low floor single decker bus

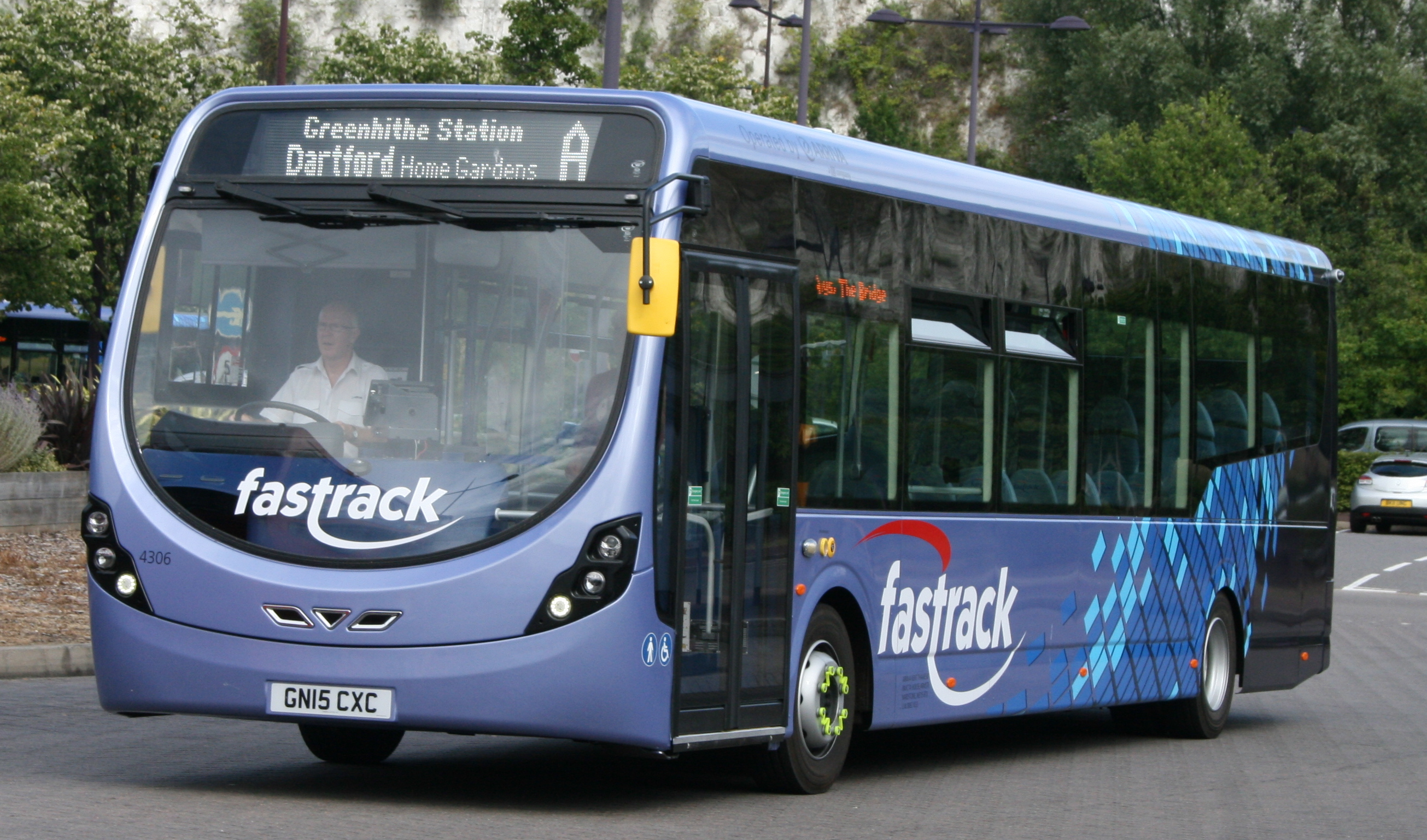
- Arriva Southern Counties Fastrack liveried StreetLite Max in August 2015

Overview
- Manufacturer: Wrightbus
- Production: 2010–2024
- Assembly: Ballymena, Northern Ireland

Body and chassis
- Class: Integral bus
- Doors: 1-2
- Floor type: Low floor
- Chassis: Integral Wrightbus design

Powertrain
- Engine: Daimler OM934; Cummins ISBe
- Capacity: 33-45 (seated)
- Power output: 160-250 bhp
- Transmission: Voith DIWA, Allison

Dimensions
- Length: WF: 8.8m (28.9 feet), 9.5m (31.2 feet) DF: 10.2m (33.5 feet), 10.8m (35.4 feet) Max (DF): 11.5m (37.7 feet)
- Width: 2445mm/2.45m
- Height: 3060mm/3.06m
- Curb weight: MGW 13,408kg

Chronology
- Successor: Wright GB Hawk; Wright GB Kite; Rightech RB6; Rightech RB9(WF)

The Wright StreetLite is a low-floor midibus introduced by Wrightbus in 2010. It was originally available in only one body style (wheel forward) before the door forward and StreetLite Max variants were introduced in 2011 and 2012 respectively. Production of all variants of the StreetLite was briefly suspended due to Wrightbus entering administration in September 2019, with complete removal from the product line in 2023.

== Models ==
The StreetLite is available in two differing body styles and five lengths between 8.8 and 11.5 metres (28 ft 10 in and 37 ft 9 in) with seating ranging from 33 to 45 passengers. All variants are of the same width and height, except for the StreetVibe, which is offered as a narrower chassis. Wrightbus claims that in each length, the StreetLite offers more seats than the equivalent competitors.

=== StreetLite WF (wheel-forward) ===
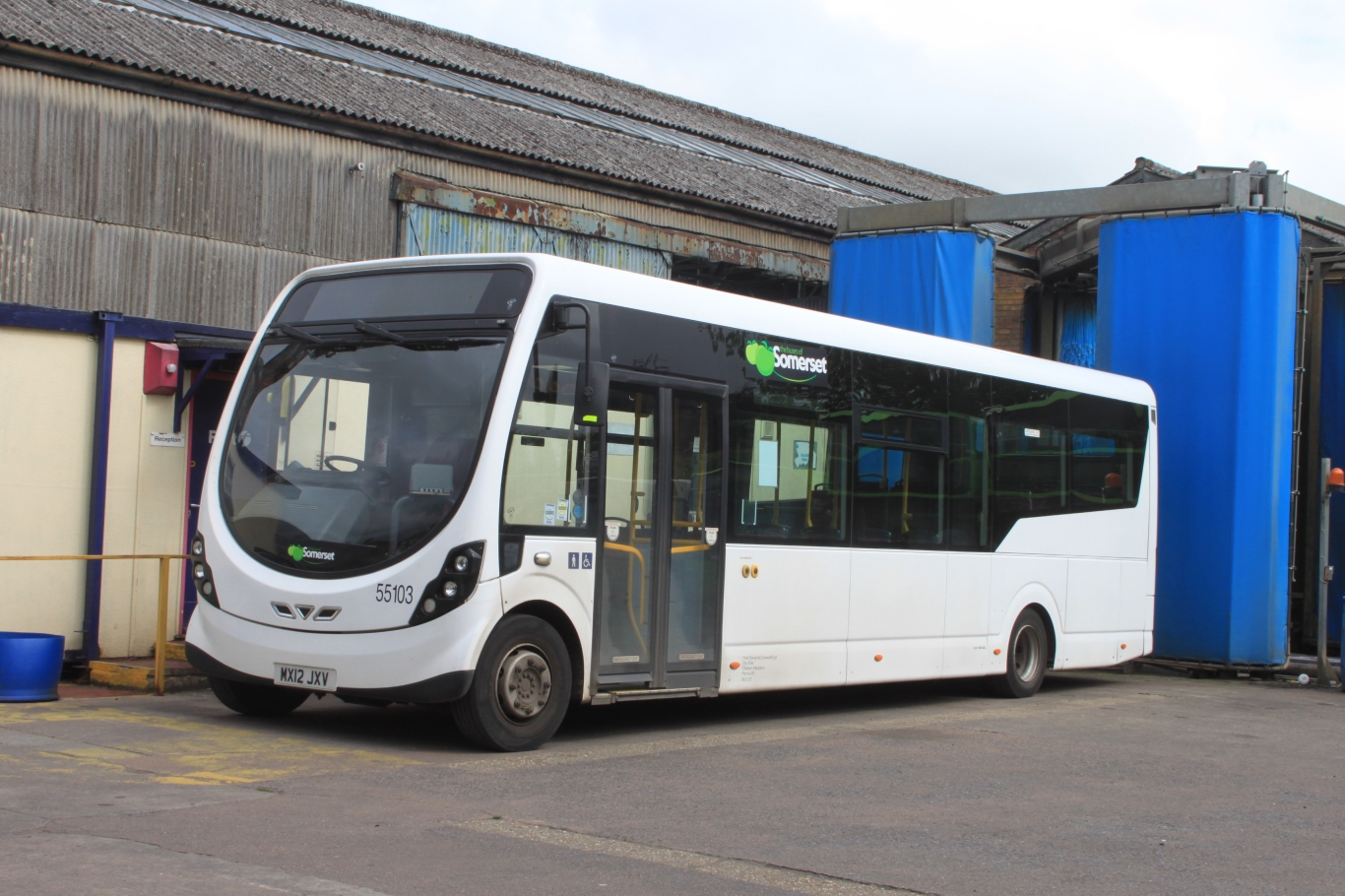
The Buses of Somerset Wheel Forward StreetLite in 2015

The StreetLite WF (wheel-forward) was the first model to be launched, first going on sale in 2010. It is available in two lengths of 8.8 metres (28 ft 10 in) and 9.5 metres (31 ft 2 in), with seating for up to 33 and 37 passengers respectively. To save space in these variants, the axle is positioned ahead of the door, similarly to the StreetLite WF's main competitor, the Optare Solo SR.

The first example entered service with Anglian Bus in October 2010.

==== StreetVibe ====
The StreetVibe, initially known as the Nu-Track Nu-Vibe concept vehicle, was launched in 2015 following Wrightbus' purchase of welfare bus manufacturer Nu-Track. It is a development of its Nu-Vibe concept vehicle, modified to Wrightbus specifications. The StreetVibe is based on the StreetLite WF, measuring 9 metres (29 ft 6 in) long. However, the StreetVibe is 290 mm (11.4 in) shorter and 167 mm (6.6 in) narrower than a standard StreetLite. As such, the StreetVibe is designed to compete directly with the Optare Solo SR Slimline, another narrow midibus.

The first StreetVibe entered service with East Lothian Council in April 2016, the first of eight examples to be delivered to the council. A further two StreetVibes were delivered to Moray Council in June and July 2016. The largest single order for StreetVibes was placed by the government of Guernsey's buses.gg operation, with 12 initial examples first entering service on the island between April and May 2017. A repeat order for 22 more StreetVibes were delivered to the island in autumn 2018.

==== VDL Citea MLE ====
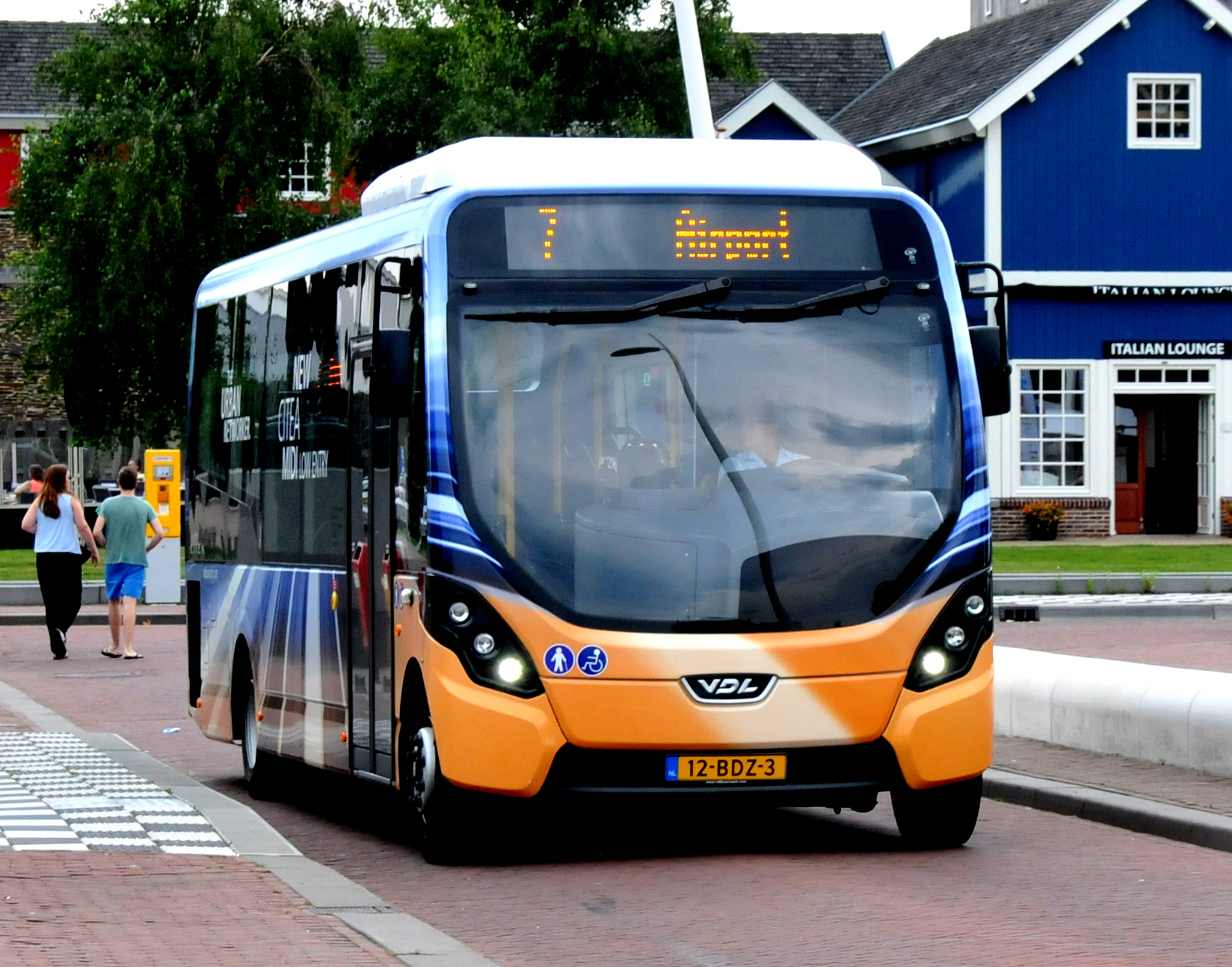
Arriva Netherlands VDL Citea MLE in Lelystad in August 2014

In October 2013, VDL Bus & Coach introduced a rebadged variant of the StreetLite WF, known as the Citea MLE, for the mainland European market.

Quick Parking of Haarlem in the Netherlands took delivery of the first production Citea MLE in May 2014. The initial demonstrator vehicle ultimately entered service with Arriva Netherlands in June 2014. Nobina Danmark are the largest operator of the Citea MLE, taking delivery of five examples in December 2014 and a further pair in June 2015. A further two Citea MLEs entered service in Denmark with Keolis Danmark in December 2014.

=== StreetLite DF (door-forward) ===
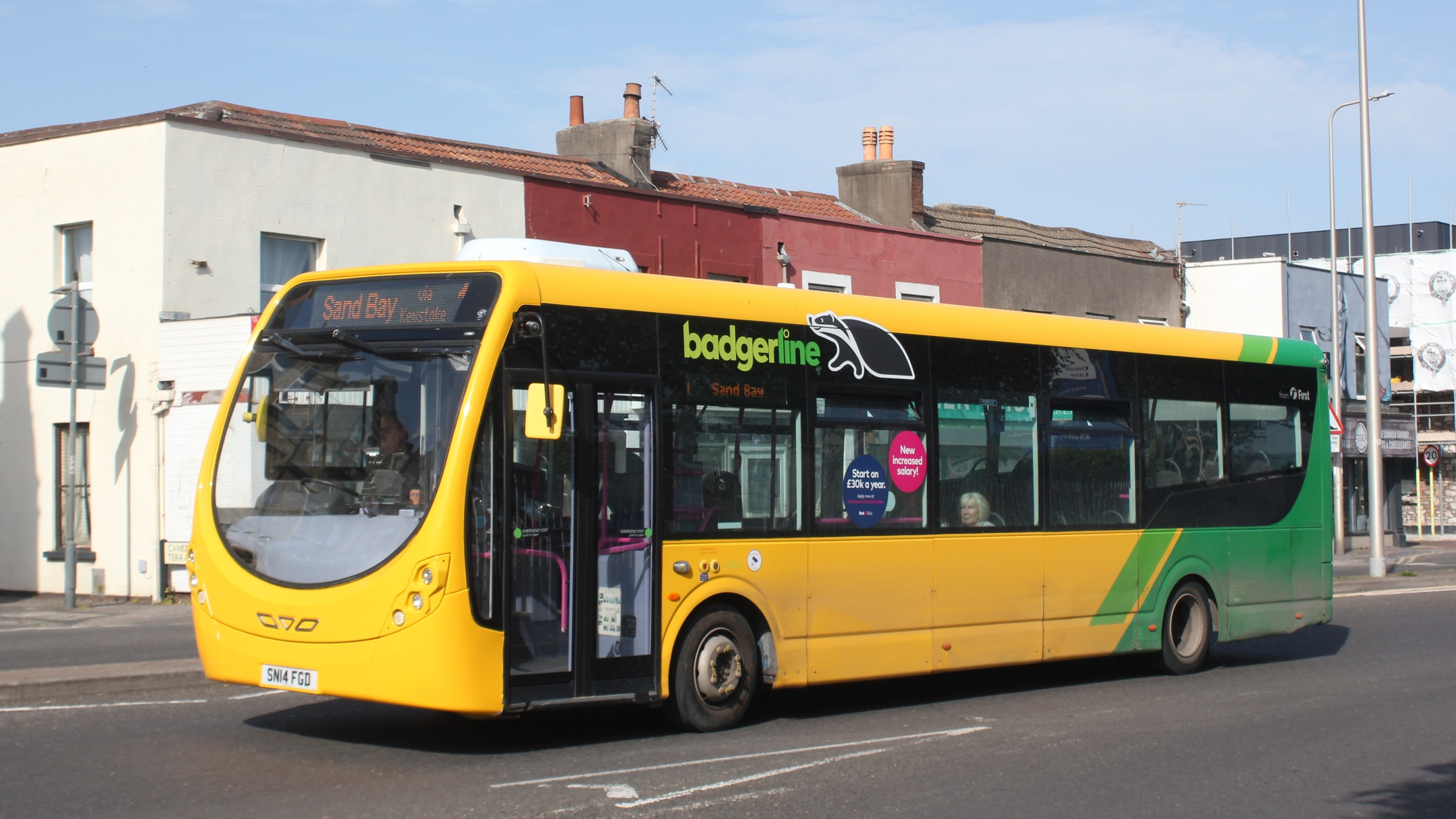
First West of England Door Forward StreetLite in 2026

The Door Forward StreetLite variant, also known as the StreetLite DF, was launched in 2011. It is available in two lengths of 10.2 metres (33 ft 6 in) and 10.8 metres (35 ft 5 in) with seating for up to 37 and 41 passengers respectively. In this variant the axle is positioned behind the door and there is an option for dual door configuration for Transport for London specifications. The first example was trialled by First London.

==== StreetLite Max ====
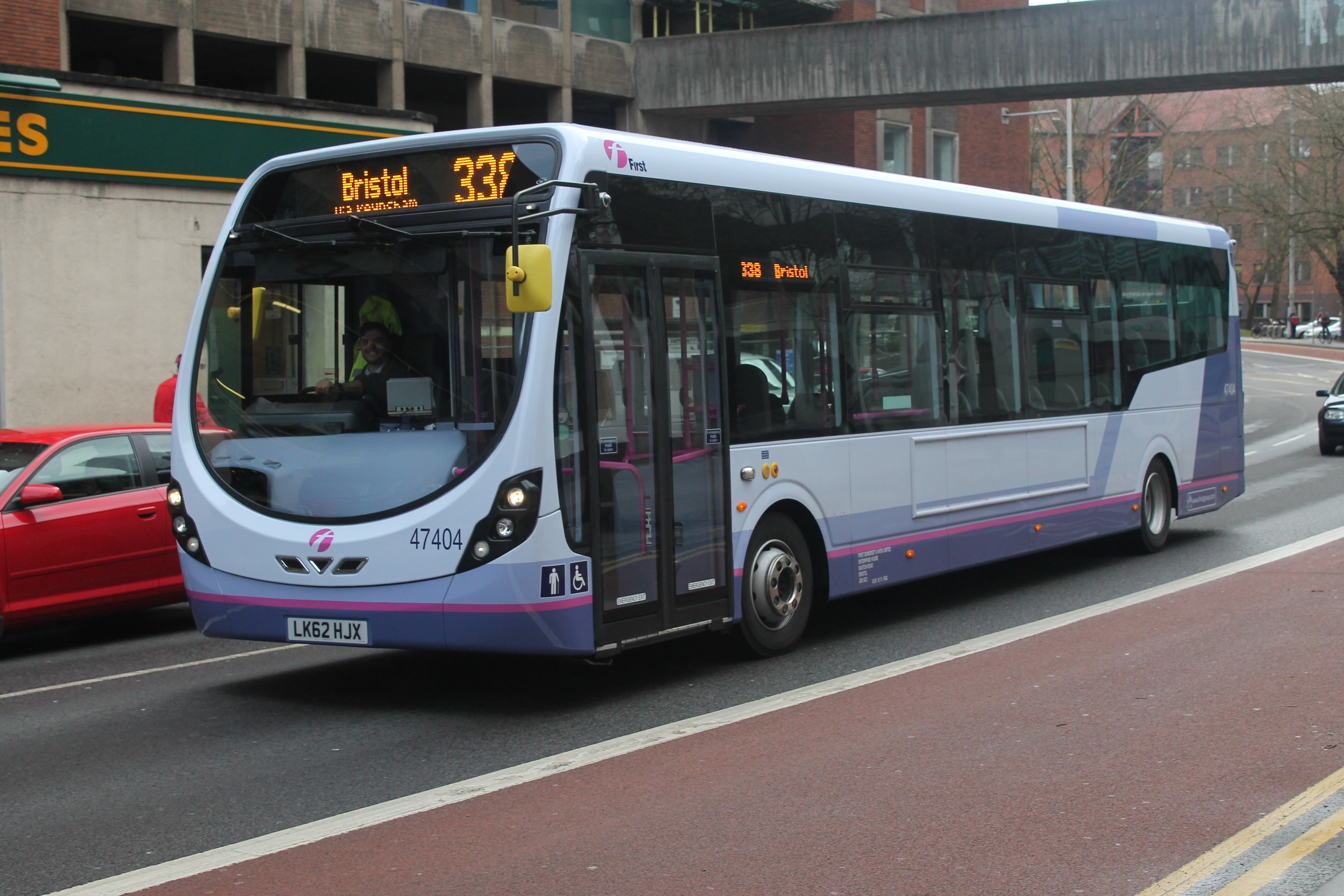
First Somerset & Avon Door Forward StreetLite Max in 2013

The StreetLite Max was launched in 2012. It is 11.5 metres (37 ft 9 in) long with capacity for up to 45 passengers seated. In this variant, the axle is positioned behind the door like the "door forward" and also has the same Cummins 4-cylinder 210 horsepower engine and Voith DIWA transmission. A Euro VI-compliant version of Cummins engine and Mercedes-Benz OM934 became available in 2013.

The StreetLite Max competes against heavyweight buses such as the Alexander Dennis Enviro300 and Optare Tempo SR as well as other lightweight vehicles such as the Alexander Dennis Enviro200 and Optare Versa. Deliveries of the StreetLite Max commenced in 2012.

== Propulsion ==
=== Diesel ===
The majority of all StreetLites models produced up until 2018 have been the standard diesel variant, with FirstGroup the largest customer of the type.

==== Micro Hybrid ====
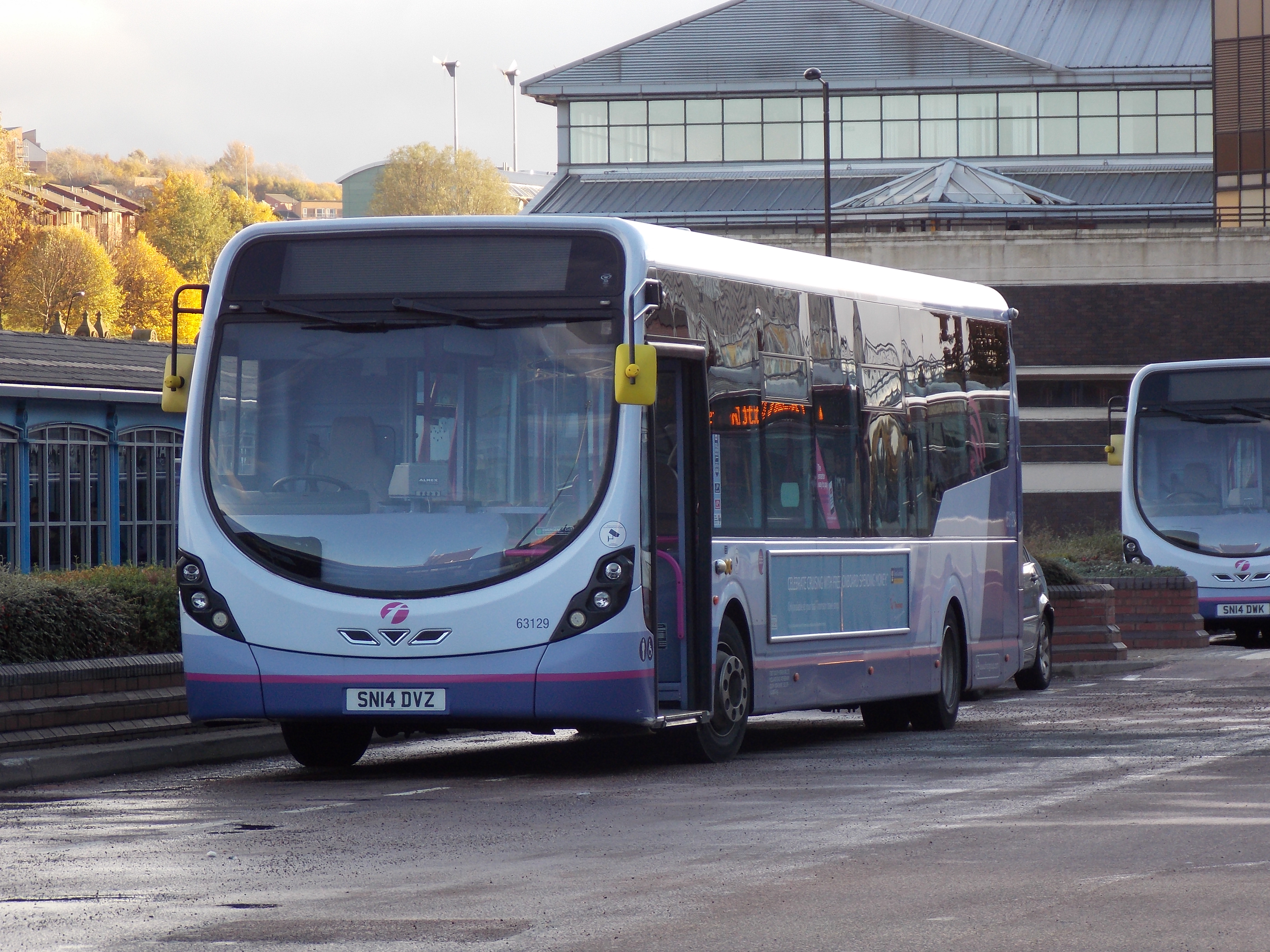
The first production Wright StreetLite Max to be fitted with Micro Hybrid technology, a 2014 model delivered new to First South Yorkshire

The StreetLite Micro Hybrid was launched in 2013. It is available in all of the standard StreetLite lengths and capacities. While not a "hybrid" in the usual sense, the StreetLite Micro Hybrid recovers energy lost from braking to power the vehicle electrics and compressed air systems, saving up to 10% in fuel costs. The bus itself runs from a conventional StreetLite drivetrain, as opposed to a small diesel engine and electric motor in normal hybrids.

=== Hybrid ===
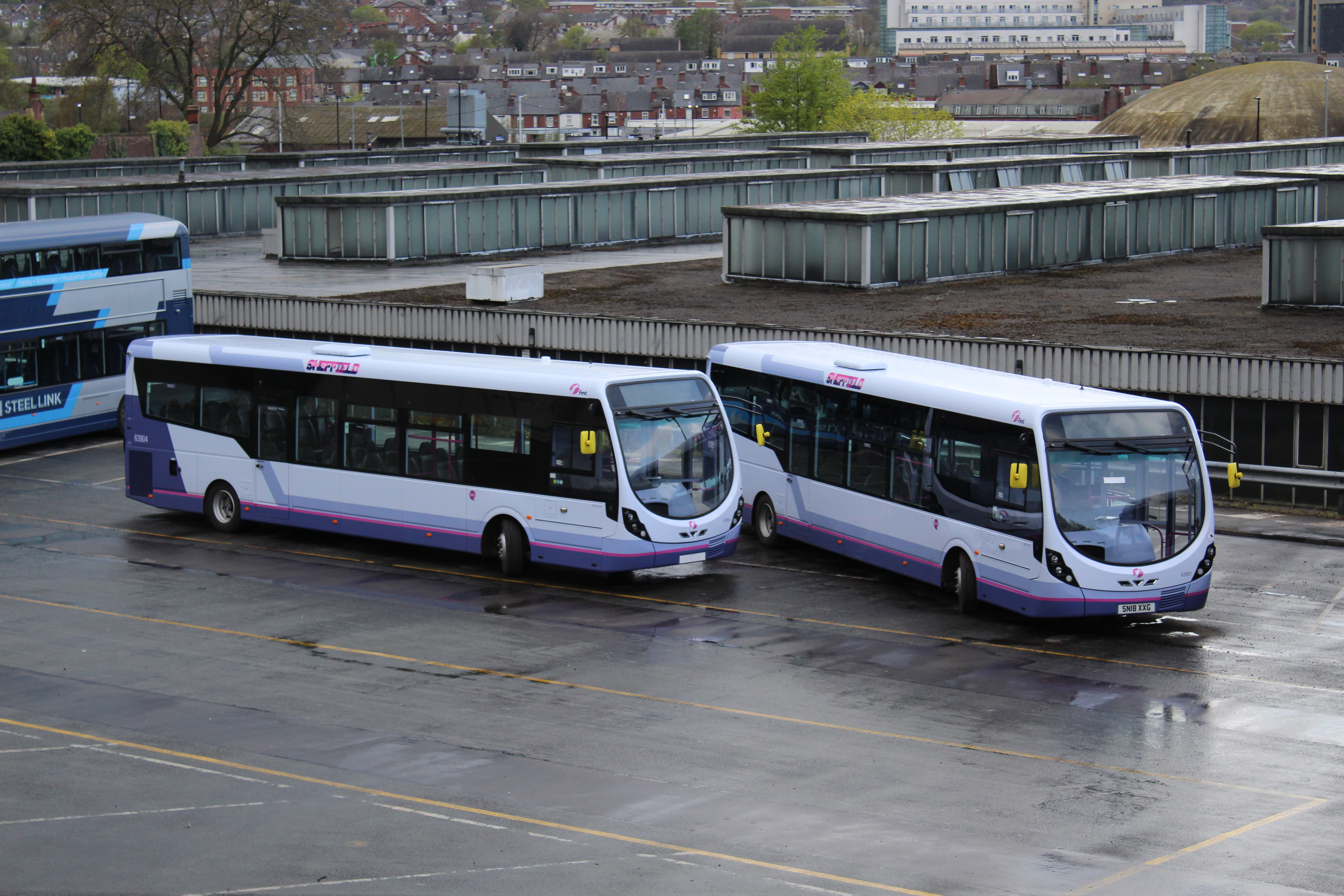
The first two production fully hybrid-electric Wright StreetLite Maxes at First South Yorkshire's Olive Grove depot prior to entry into service in April 2018 – note the additional front grille

All models of the StreetLite are currently offered as full hybrid-electric vehicles, with the first hybrid StreetLite WF entering service in 2014, followed by the first hybrid StreetLite Maxes which entered service in May 2018 with First South Yorkshire. The hybrid StreetLite Max can be easily distinguished from the standard diesel variants from the presence of an additional grille in the front bumper, which provides cooling to the hybrid battery pack, located over the front axle behind the front door, through cooling channels under the floor in the door area. This grille is not present in the hybrid StreetLite WF, as the hybrid battery pack is located close to the engine at the rear of the bus due to lack of space at the front.

In 2017, Travel South Yorkshire placed an order for 31 hybrid-electric Wright StreetLite Maxes for Sheffield services 1 and 1a. These were to be the first StreetLite Max models to be fitted with fully hybrid technology. The order was split between two operators – 13 for First South Yorkshire's service 1a, an operator who already operated over 100 diesel StreetLites across the city; and 18 for Stagecoach Sheffield's service 1, Stagecoach's first StreetLite Maxes delivered nationally. The first four hybrid StreetLite Maxes were delivered to First South Yorkshire on 26 April 2018, with first entry into service taking place on 10 May (First) and 19 May (Stagecoach).

The wheel-forward and shorter door-forward StreetLite models are also offered as full hybrids. Arriva Shires & Essex took delivery of 13 hybrid StreetLite WFs for its Luton depot in 2014, followed by a further five at its High Wycombe depot in 2015.

=== Electric ===
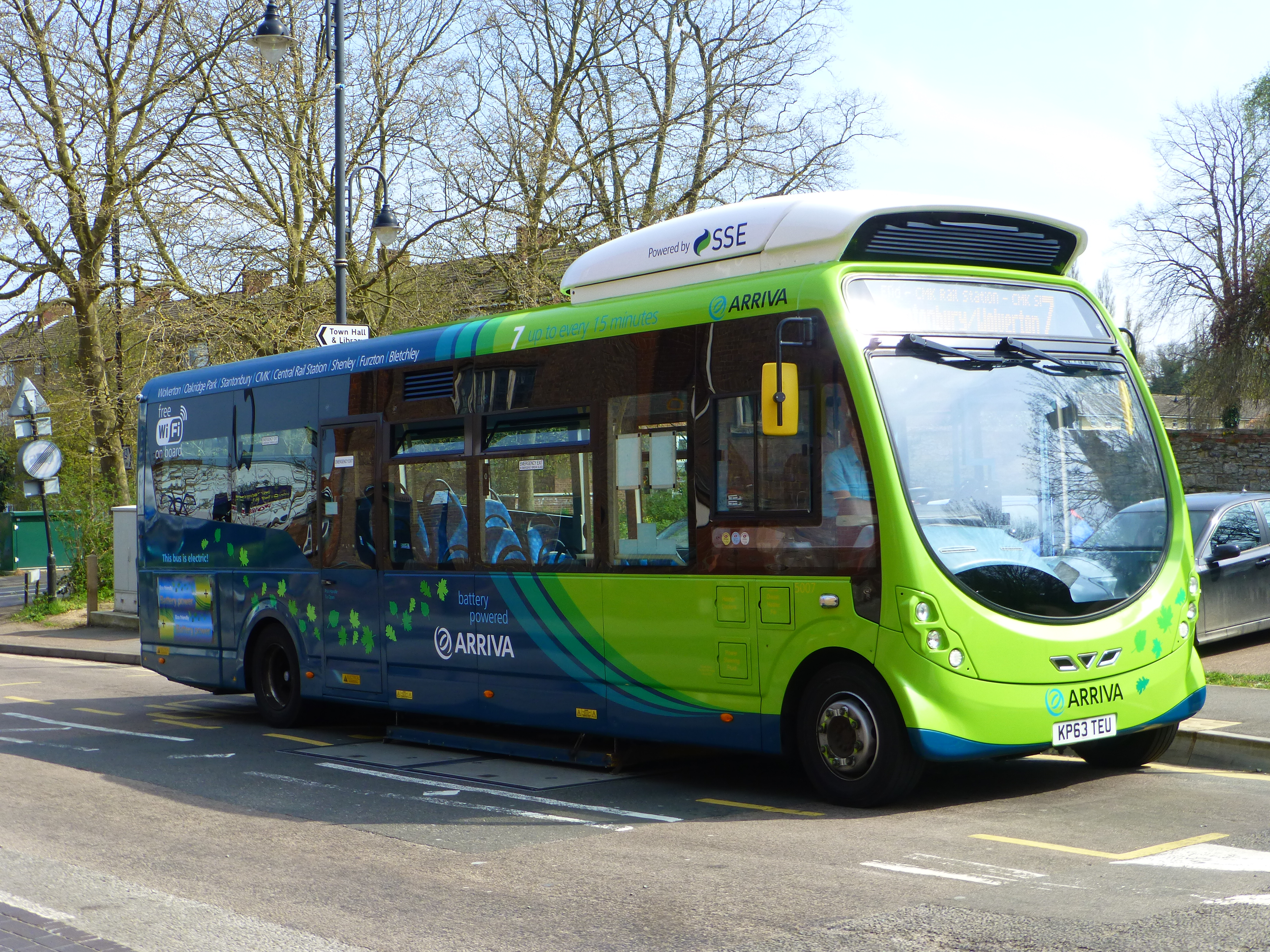
Arriva The Shires StreetLite EV in Wolverton in 2015

The StreetLite EV was launched in 2014. Like the Micro Hybrid, it is available in all of the standard StreetLite lengths and capacities. The StreetLite EV is a battery electric bus with no diesel engine.

In January 2014, Arriva Shires & Essex placed eight EVs into service in Milton Keynes receiving coverage on national news services due to their trial of inductive charging, the first buses of their kind to do so in the United Kingdom.

== Operators ==
=== United Kingdom ===
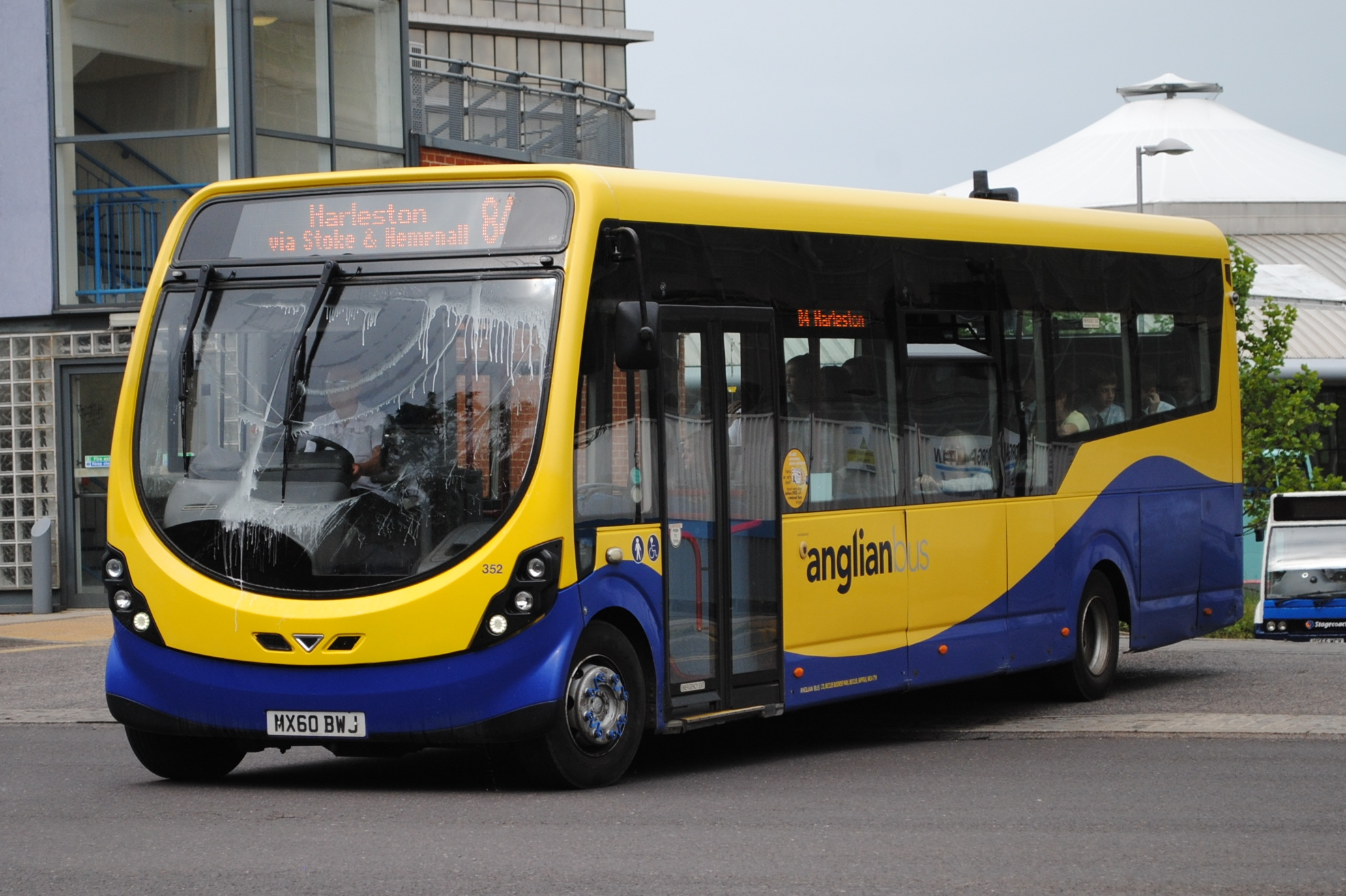
Anglian Bus Wheel Forward StreetLite in July 2015

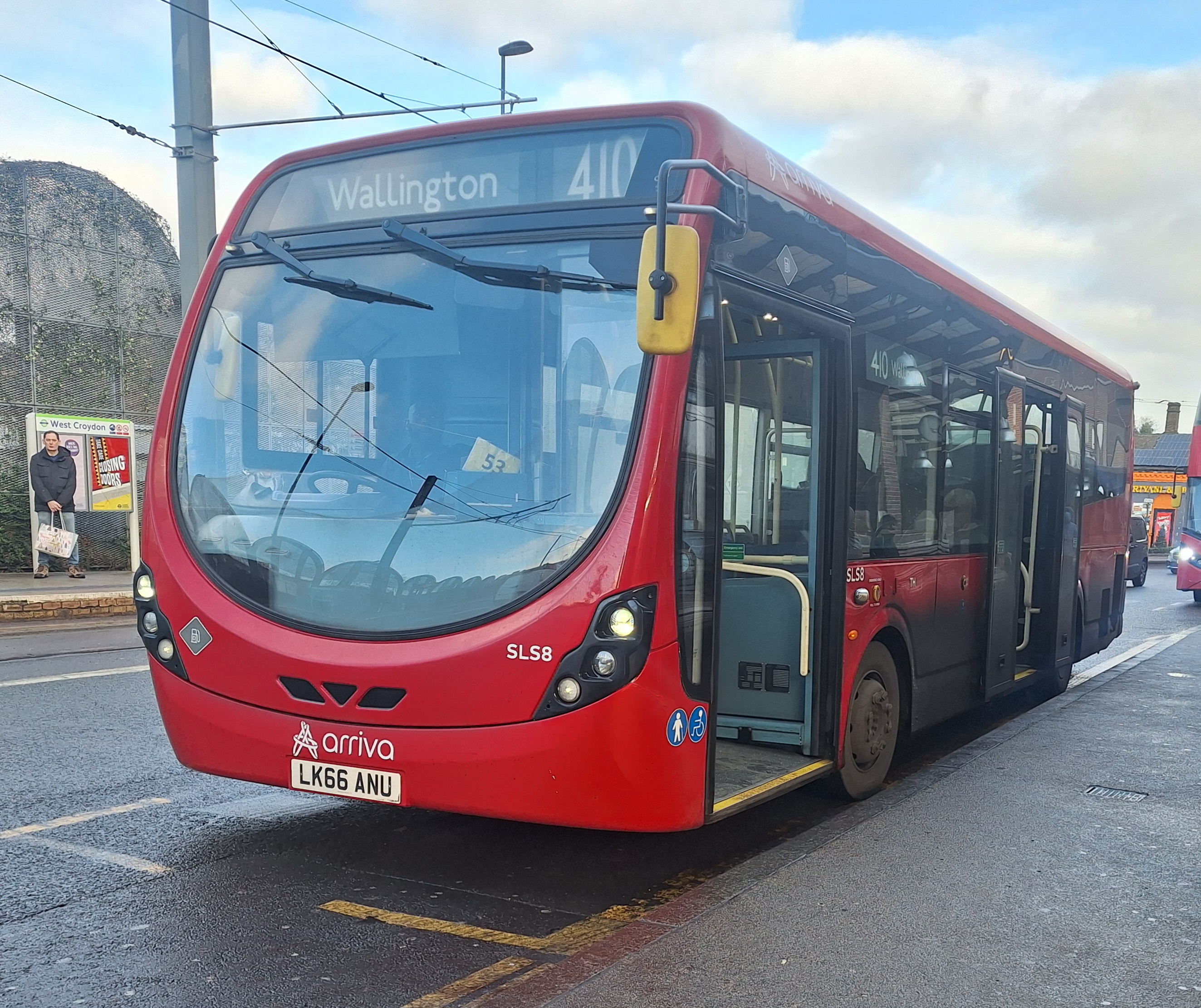
Arriva London Door Forward StreetLite in January 2025

Bus Vannin on the Isle of Man were the first company to order the StreetLite, ordering six 9.5m variants and six 10.8m variants. Whilst the 9.5m variants entered service in December 2010, the 10.8m variants, which were due in early 2011, would never be delivered. The first StreetLites to enter service with any operator were four that were delivered to Anglian Bus in October 2010. Since then, Arriva, the FirstGroup, the Go-Ahead Group, Rotala and the Stagecoach Group have all been purchasers.

The StreetLite has been operated by Transport for London operators Arriva London, Blue Triangle, First London, London General, Sullivan Buses, Quality Line and Tower Transit. As of May 2020, StreetLite WFs were operating routes 379, 424 and 463, while Wright DFs were operating routes 219, 232, 236, 299, 327, 389 and 399. Safari buses entered service with Knowsley Safari Park.

Padarn Bus took three 9.5 metre StreetLites for services on Anglesey. whilst Maytree Travel obtained six 9.5 metre vehicles. Reading Buses have also taken six 9.5 metre variants. The first large order for 46 was placed by the FirstGroup in April 2011.

In February 2013, the FirstGroup ordered 179 new StreetLites, predominantly in the form of the 11.5m Max variant, to work alongside the four prototype vehicles already at the company. In January 2014, a further 301 were ordered, with 274 of them featuring 'Micro Hybrid' technology.

In April 2014, Arriva ordered 97 "Micro Hybrid" StreetLites, 70 of which are the Max (11.5m) variant with 27 others of an unspecified length. In March 2015, Arriva ordered a further 50 StreetLites.

=== Ireland ===
The first new StreetLites to enter service in Ireland were delivered to Dublin Bus in 2017, with 2 examples arriving for the 44B route between Glencullen and Dundrum, a route which could not accommodate double decker buses or full length single-deck buses.

In 2018, the National Transport Authority ordered a batch of 88 StreetLites, which entered service between 2019 and 2020 on Transport for Ireland contracted bus services. Of these, 43 were allocated to Go-Ahead Ireland in Dublin, while Bus Éireann received 43, with 17 entering service in Waterford, 12 in Dundalk and Drogheda, seven in Athlone, five in Sligo and two in Dublin. City Direct operate the remaining 5 in Kilkenny.

In addition, a handful of StreetLites are also operated by smaller operators, including single vehicles for First Aircoach.

=== Exports ===
In January 2017, a StreetLite commenced a trial with Australian operator Torrens Transit. Three StreetLite Maxes entered service with New Zealand operator Leopard Coachlines in 2017.

== Mistral ==
Wrightbus secured an exclusivity deal with Mistral, a bus sales and rental company. Mistral were the sole selling agents for the StreetLite and pitched the vehicle as 'Wrightbus+Mistral – the perfect equation'. This exclusivity deal ended in 2012 with the introduction of the StreetLite Max.

== In popular culture ==
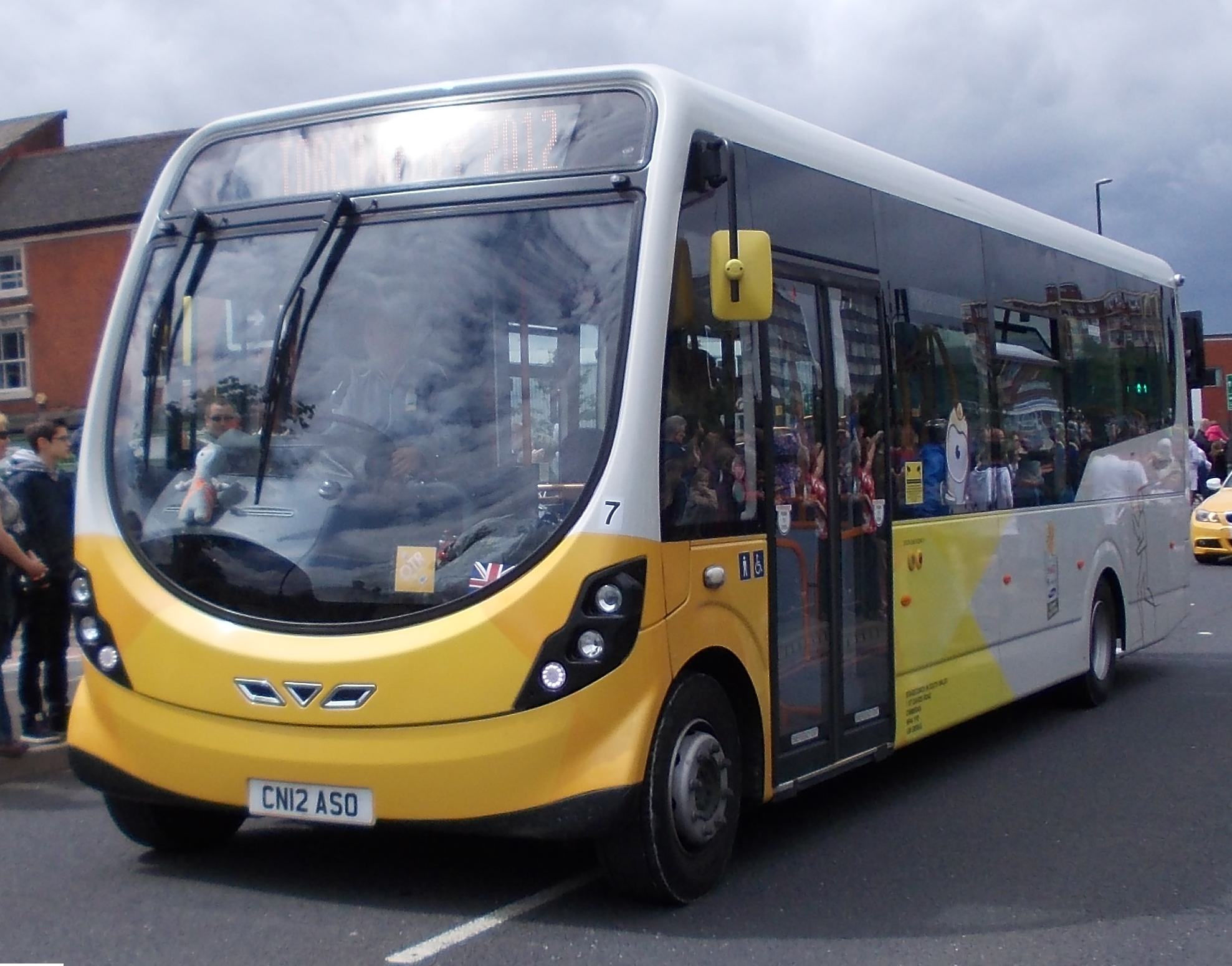
Stagecoach South Wales StreetLite on the 2012 Summer Olympics torch relay in Walsall in June 2012

The StreetLite played an integral part in the Torch Relay for the 2012 London Olympic Games. Ten Stagecoach South Wales StreetLites were used to shuttle relay runners and event staff between relay starting points. The buses were decorated in a special amber vinyl wrap with lettering for the games.
