= Switch Metrodecker =

British-built model of double-decker bus, built since 2014

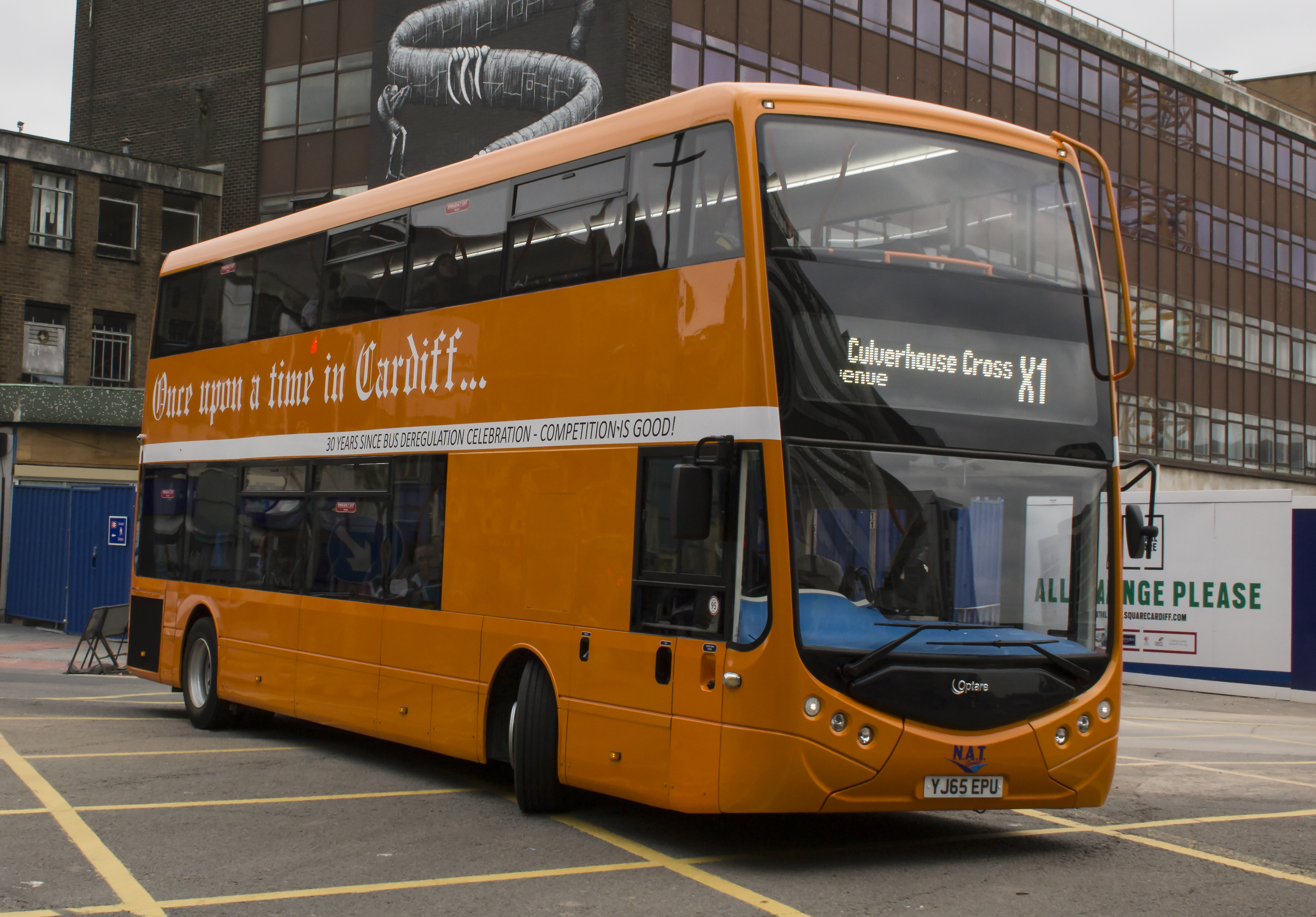
- NAT Group MetroDecker in Cardiff in 2016

Overview
- Manufacturer: Switch Mobility
- Production: 2014–2025

Body and chassis
- Doors: 1-2
- Floor type: Low floor
- Related: Switch Metrocity

Powertrain
- Engine: Mercedes-Benz OM934LA; 250kW Full Electric
- Capacity: 63 - 84 seated
- Transmission: ZF EcoLife 6AP 1000B 6-speed ZF AVE 130 hub motor axle

Dimensions
- Length: 10.5 m (34 ft 5 in) & 11.1 m (36 ft 5 in)
- Width: 2.5 m (8 ft 2 in)
- Height: 4.31 m (14 ft 2 in)
- Curb weight: 9.98 tonnes (9.82 long tons; 11.00 short tons)

Chronology
- Predecessor: Optare OmniDekka; Optare Olympus

The Switch Metrodecker (formerly known as the Optare MetroDecker) is an integral twin-axle double-decker bus produced by British bus manufacturer Switch Mobility since 2014. The bus bears resemblance to the Switch Metrocity, sharing similar interior and exterior features. The MetroDecker was designed as the successor to the Optare Olympus and Optare OmniDekka double-deckers, which were both discontinued in 2011, however unlike these, the MetroDecker is only available in integral form.

Switch Mobility, then known as Optare, initially aimed to have MetroDeckers in service in London by the end of 2014 and sales of over 100 MetroDeckers within eighteen months of launch; this did not occur, with no orders placed until June 2018.

== Variants ==
=== Metrodecker ===
The Metrodecker was launched by Optare in 2014 initially with the 4 cylinder Euro VI Mercedes-Benz OM934LA engine with a 6-speed ZF EcoLife transmission fitted. The bus is built on an integral Optare chassis, making the bus lighter than its body-on-chassis predecessors.

In June 2018, Reading Buses placed the first order for five diesel Metrodeckers with high specification interiors for use on Green Line route 702, following a period of demonstration. Due to the economic impact of the COVID-19 pandemic, Reading Buses cancelled the order in July 2020.

Three pre-production demonstrators were built by Optare for bus operators to trial around the United Kingdom. Two of these entered service with First South Yorkshire, Go North East and the NAT Group, and a demonstrator built to Transport for London specification commenced trials with Go-Ahead London in August 2016. None of these demonstration periods resulted in orders for the diesel Metrodecker.

=== Metrodecker EV ===
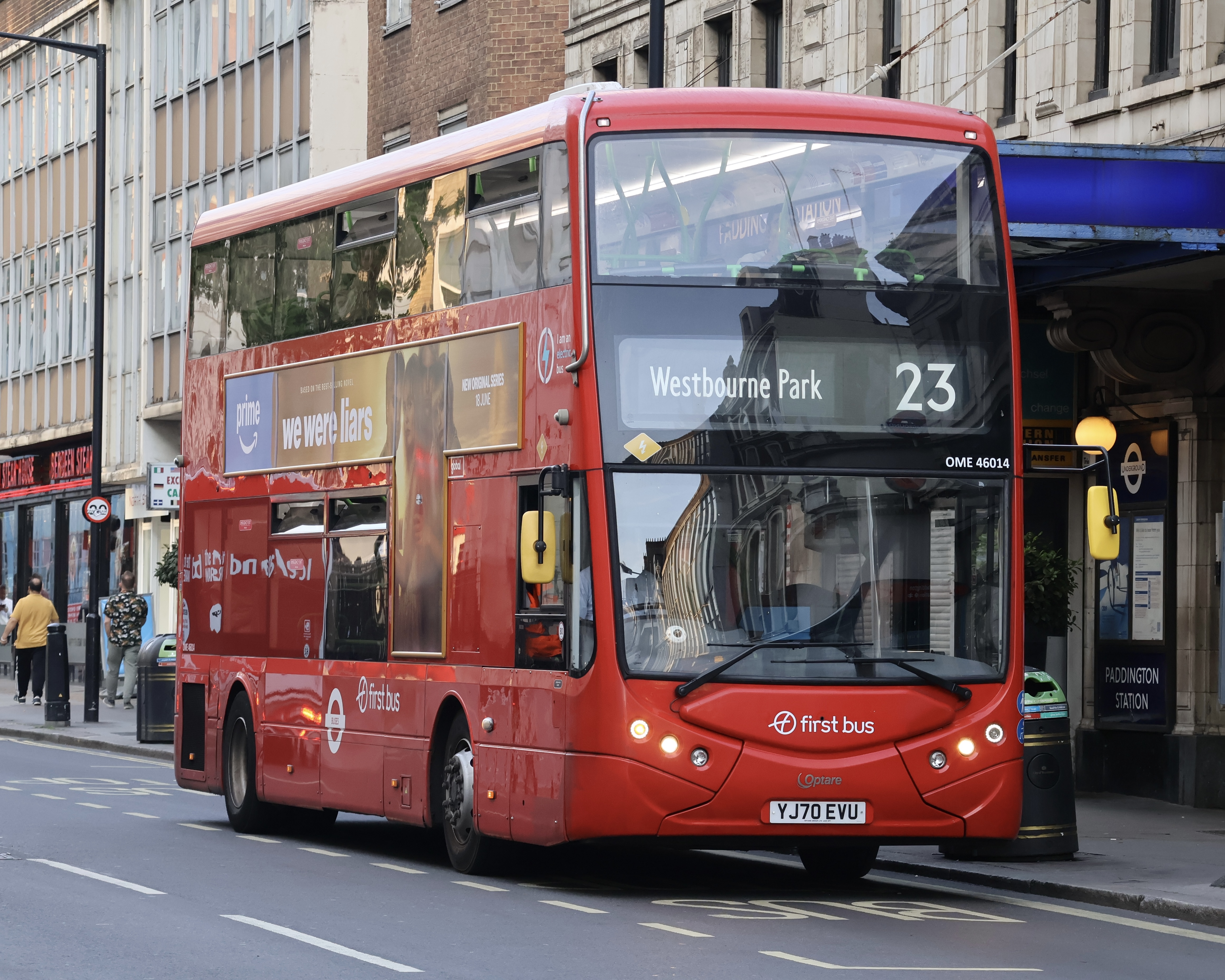
London Transit Optare MetroDecker EV at Paddington in June 2025

The Switch Metrodecker EV battery electric bus was launched in late 2015, complementing Optare's single decker range which already had battery electric variants. The battery supports 250 kW of power with an electric ZF AxTrax AVE powertrain, resulting in an electric range of 160 miles (260 km). A hybrid electric variant was announced by Optare during the initial launch of the MetroDecker in 2015, however no orders materialised.

The first Metrodecker order for a Transport for London operator came in 2019 when 31 Metrodecker EVs were delivered to Metroline for operation on route 134. 37 Metrodecker EVs were later delivered to Tower Transit in November 2020 for operation on routes 23 and C3, and Go-Ahead London ordered 17 Metrodecker EVs for delivery in May 2021 for operation on route 200.

In March 2019, First York ordered 21 Metrodecker EVs for the city's rebranded York Park & Ride operations. The first of these buses entered service from July 2020.

=== MetroDecker H2 ===
The Optare MetroDecker H2 fuel cell bus was announced by Optare in partnership with Arcola Energy in April 2020. The MetroDecker H2 is based on existing EV platform, utilising Arcola's A-Drive hydrogen fuel cell electric powertrain with a claimed range of up to 250 miles (400 km). Optare aims to establish an export market aimed at countries within a humid subtropical climate requiring use of air conditioning for the MetroDecker H2, however orders are yet to be placed by potential operators.

== Incidents ==
A major fire in May 2022 that destroyed six buses at Metroline's Potters Bar garage, two of which were Metrodecker EVs, caused Switch Mobility to order all Metrodecker EVs to be taken out of service for safety precautions. An investigation into the Potters Bar fire found that a conductive coolant had inadvertently been added to the battery system of a Metrodecker EV instead of a non-conductive one, and the buses returned to service later that month.

A Metrodecker EV operated by Go-Ahead London caught fire on 11 January 2024 while operating route 200 in Wimbledon, with the cause for the fire under investigation by the operator.

== See also ==
- Switch Metrocity
- List of buses
