= Switch E1 =

Low-floor single-decker electric bus introduced in 2022

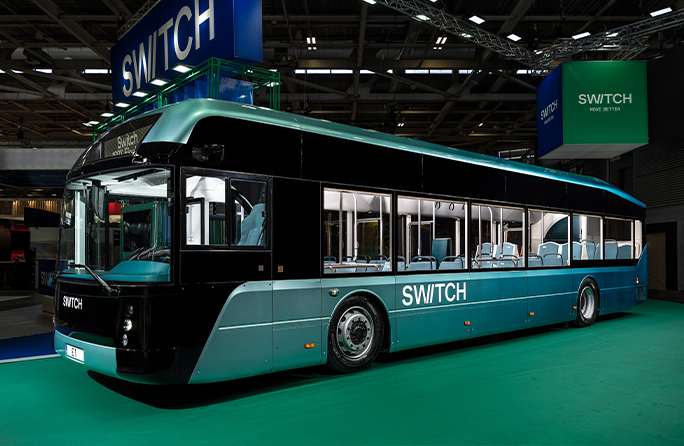

Overview
- Manufacturer: Switch Mobility
- Production: 2022-present
- Assembly: Sherburn in Elmet, Yorkshire; Valladolid, Spain

Body and chassis
- Class: Single-decker bus
- Layout: Rear-motor, rear-wheel drive
- Doors: 2 or 3
- Floor type: Low-floor
- Chassis: Integral

Powertrain
- Electric motor: 2x 125 kW ZF Electrified Powertrain Technology hubs
- Capacity: 389 kWh
- Power output: 250 kW (340 bhp)
- Transmission: ZF automatic
- Battery: 3x high voltage lithium–nickel–manganese–cobalt oxide packs
- Electric range: 240 mi (390 km)
- Plug-in charging: CCS2 connector; DC up to 150 kW, 3 hours; AC up to 44 kW, 7 hours

Dimensions
- Wheelbase: 6 m (20 ft)
- Length: 12 m (39 ft)
- Width: 2.5 m (8.2 ft)
- Height: 3.1 m (10 ft)
- Kerb weight: 10,775 kg (10.775 t), unladen; 18,000 kg (18 t), GVW

Chronology
- Predecessor: Optare Tempo SR; Optare Versa

The Switch E1 (stylised as the SWITCH e1) is a low-floor single-decker electric bus produced by Switch Mobility since 2022. The E1 is the first vehicle to be introduced by Switch Mobility since their rebranding from Optare, and replaces the discontinued Optare Tempo SR and Optare Versa in their product range.

The E1 was unveiled on 7 June 2022 at the European Mobility Expo at the Expo Porte de Versailles in Paris, France. The interior features a highly customisable modular design, similarly to the competing Arrival Bus, with two or three doors and a maximum of 30 seats. Total passenger capacity is up to 93 passengers per bus, with capacity for 63 standing. Each seat can be fitted with reading lights, USB phone charging ports and under-seat lights, with wide-screen monitors fitted throughout the cabin to display next stops and other information. Wheelchair access is available through both the front and middle doors, with wheelchair bays optionally fitted opposite either or both.

The E1 was known during development as Project Odin generation 4; further Project Odin models were expected to launch later in 2022. According to Switch Mobility, the E1 is the lightest electric bus on the market. Fast charging is available, with a full charge in three hours possible through DC charging; total range on a full charge is expected to be around 390 kilometres (240 mi). At launch, the E1 was aimed at the continental European market, with the Optare MetroCity EV still to be constructed for the United Kingdom. The E1 will be the first model to be produced at Switch Mobility's newly constructed carbon neutral manufacturing facility in Valladolid, Spain, commencing with two production lines dedicated to the E1; additional construction will take place at the existing former Optare factory in Sherburn in Elmet, Yorkshire.
