= Adventure Travel (bus company) =

British bus operating company

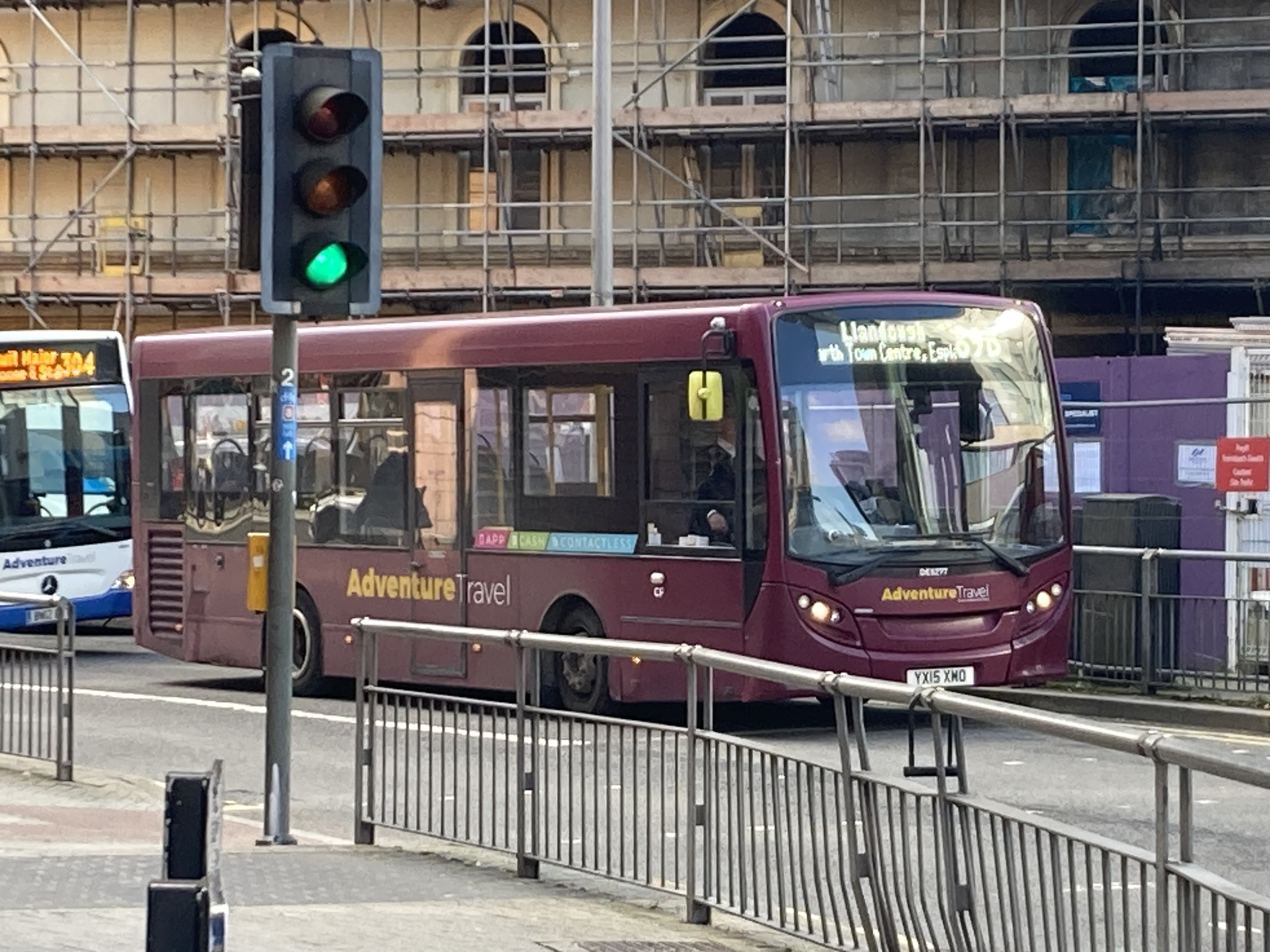
- Enviro200 in Cardiff
- Parent: ComfortDelGro
- Founded: 2008
- Headquarters: Cardiff
- Service area: South Wales
- Service type: United Kingdom Bus & coach services
- Routes: 32
- Destinations: Cardiff, Swansea, Gowerton
- Depots: Cardiff, Swansea
- Website: www.adventuretravel.cymru

Adventure Travel (formerly NAT Group and New Adventure Travel) is a bus and coach company in South Wales. It is a subsidiary of ComfortDelGro.

== History ==
Former logo

Established in 2008 with four buses, Adventure Travel has now grown to have over 100 buses and coaches in its fleet from May 2020 - with most buses being second-hand from London.

Adventure Travel purchased Humphrey's Coaches of Pontypridd in 2011, and has since purchased the businesses of VR Travel of Merthyr Tydfil in October 2013 and Select Local Bus of Neath in 2015.

In February 2018 the business was purchased by ComfortDelGro. Adam Keen of Damory Coaches was appointed managing director of New Adventure Travel.

It was confirmed in late 2019 that the business is being progressively rebranded to Adventure Travel, with the coaching side of the business being rebranded to Adventure Coachlines.

In May 2020, Adventure Travel permanently ceased all operational work in mainland Europe due to COVID-19 pandemic, and is now focusing on its United Kingdom bus and coach services.

== Routes ==
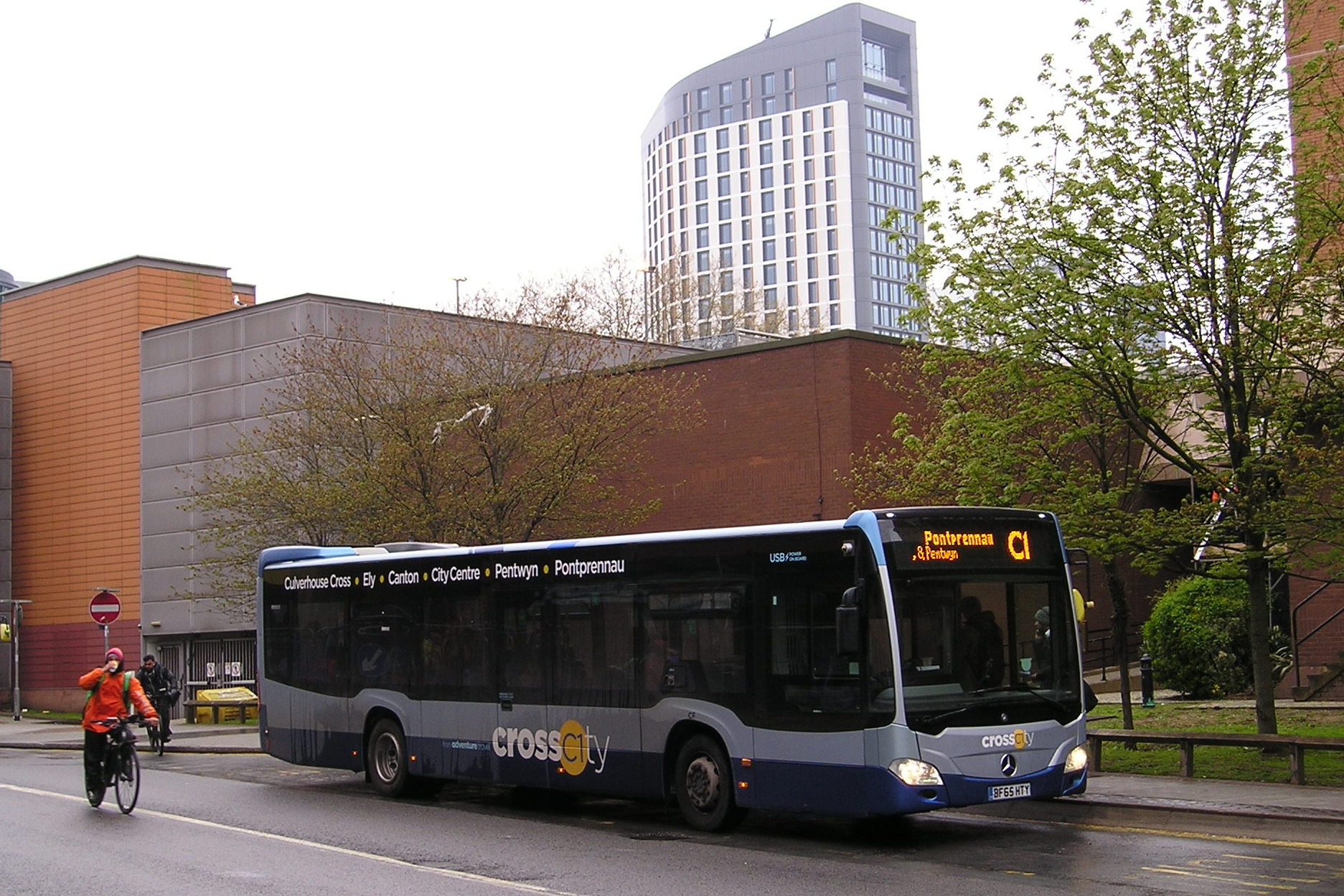
Mercedes-Benz Citaro spotted in Cardiff working the flagship "crosscity" C1 service to Pontprennau

Adventure Travel have won various routes in their operation, these include:

- Adventure Travel initially started bus routes in Cardiff city centre in 2013, operating tendered local services to Cardiff Council - however, when Crossgates Coaches (trading as Veolia Transport Cymru) ceased operation in the Pontypridd area, Adventure Travel quickly registered these lost routes - them being the 102, 103, 105, 106 and 108
- In August 2014, Adventure Travel were successful in its bid to operate the Gower Explorer buses, taking over from the former operator First Cymru on 26 October 2014.
- Adventure Travel also took over the T9 TrawsCymru route from Cardiff to Cardiff Airport from First Cymru. The T9 was run by Adventure Travel using Optare Tempo and was due to be replaced with Optare MetroCity, but the route T9 was cancelled before the Metrocity could see service.
- Adventure Travel run the TrawsCymru T6 between Swansea bus station and Brecon using branded Optare MetroCitys, Alexander Dennis Enviro200s and MCV Evoras.
- In April 2018, Adventure Travel took on the running of the TrawsCymru T1C between Cardiff and Aberystwyth using a branded Mercedes-Benz Tourismo.
- Adventure Travel run the remaining Rail linc route - the 905 between Rhoose Cardiff International Airport railway station and Cardiff Airport.
- In August 2019, Adventure Travel was named the operator for five key bus routes in Swansea.
- On 10 June 2020, Adventure Travel announced it was to start operating the Severn Express. The route was branded as the X7 'TrawsHafren' and operated between Chepstow and Bristol via Cribbs Causeway. The route began on 15 June 2020, taking over from Stagecoach West and ran for a six-month trial period until 31 December 2020. It was run with Mercedes-Benz Citaro. As of 4 January 2021, the route is numbered T7 and is operated by Newport Bus.
- On 29 June 2020, the G1 route covering Coryton, Gwaelod-y-Garth, Llandaff North, Tongwynlais, and Whitchurch was transferred to Fflecsi, a trial demand responsive transport service, where Adventure Travel operates the service in Cardiff, in partnership with Transport for Wales, and the local council. This has since been reinstated to a normal public service. As of 1 April 2024, this service no longer ran.
- On 1 April 2024, the emergency subsidy scheme by the Welsh Government was replaced by a series of local authority tenders, for all public bus routes other than those that can operate commercially. Adventure Travel suffered major losses in the re-tendering process and lost a total of 34 bus services across Rhondda Cynon Taf, Caerphilly County Borough, Merthyr Tydfil County Borough, Swansea and Monmouthshire.

== Controversy ==
In May 2015 the company faced criticism for two adverts on the back of its route X1 buses which showed a scantily clad woman and man holding a placard saying "Ride me all day for £3". Adventure Travel said that the advertising campaign had been a "tongue-in-cheek" effort to target the younger generation and no offence had been intended, but that due to the volume of complaints, it would remove the adverts immediately.

In March 2019, Adventure Travel was fined £17,550 for buses not running to registered timetables. The company also had 4 buses taken off the road due to them having defects. ComfortDelGro claimed this was due to staff shortages, and the company have since implemented new software with better monitors to make sure routes run the schedule.

2019 saw residents of Thornhill, Cardiff rebel against Adventure Travel's X8 service. The route has since been amended.

== Fleet ==
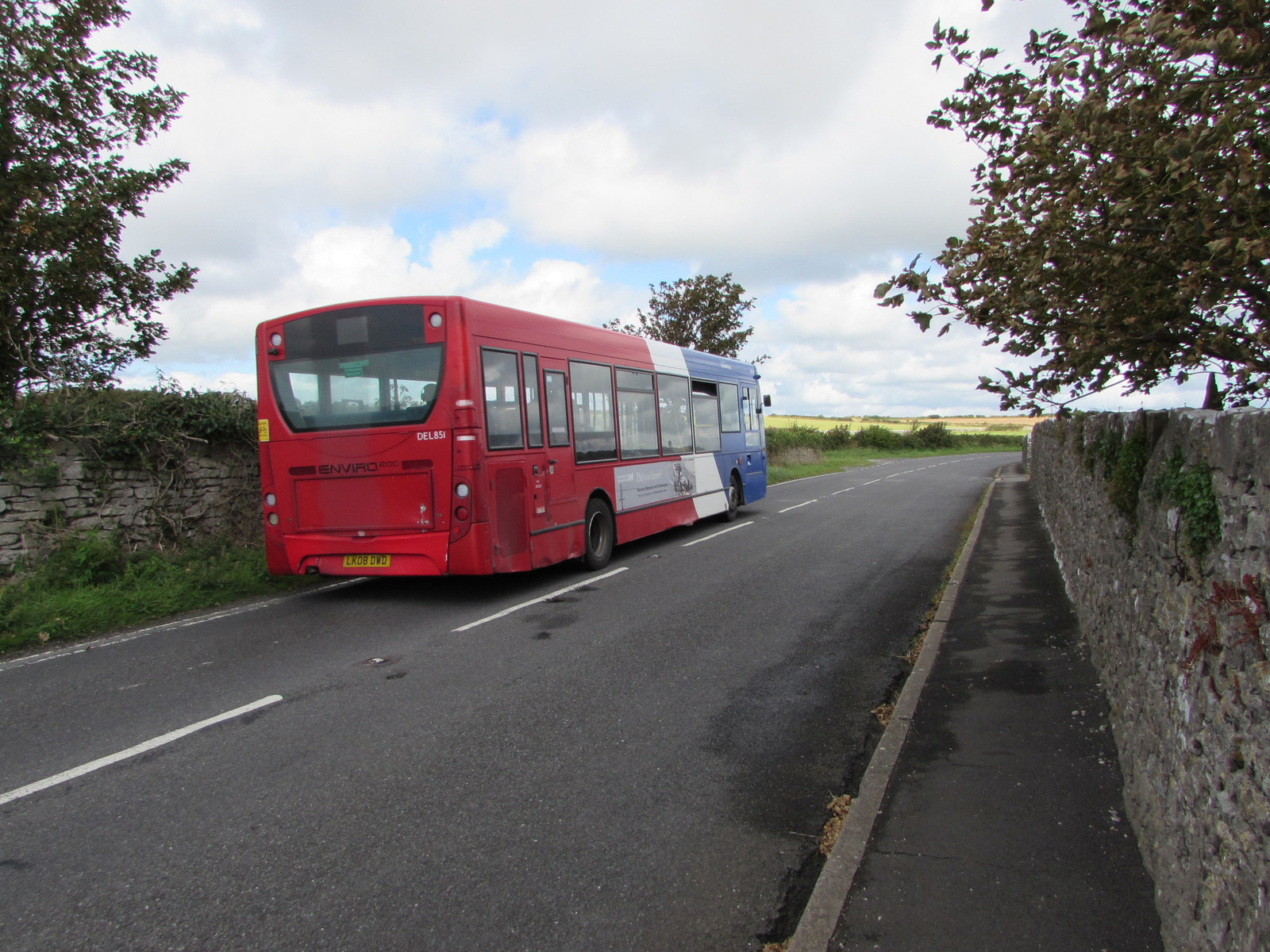
One of the ex-Metroline Alexander Dennis Enviro200's transferred from Metroline - spotted in Southerndown

As of April 2024, Adventure Travel operated around 100 vehicles out of depots in Cardiff and Swansea. The bus service fleet mainly consists of second-hand vehicles, either from London operators or their sister company, Metroline. The group also previously operated older vehicles like Alexander ALX400 and Plaxton President, but due to the fleet standardisation program they have all been retired.

Adventure Travel currently, as of April 2024, operate the following vehicles in their bus service fleet:

- Optare MetroCity
- Alexander Dennis Enviro200
- Optare Solo SR
- MCV Evolution
- MCV Evora
- Mercedes-Benz Citaro
- Scania OmniLink
- Scania OmniCity
- Alexander Dennis Enviro400
- Alexander Dennis Enviro300

== Depots ==
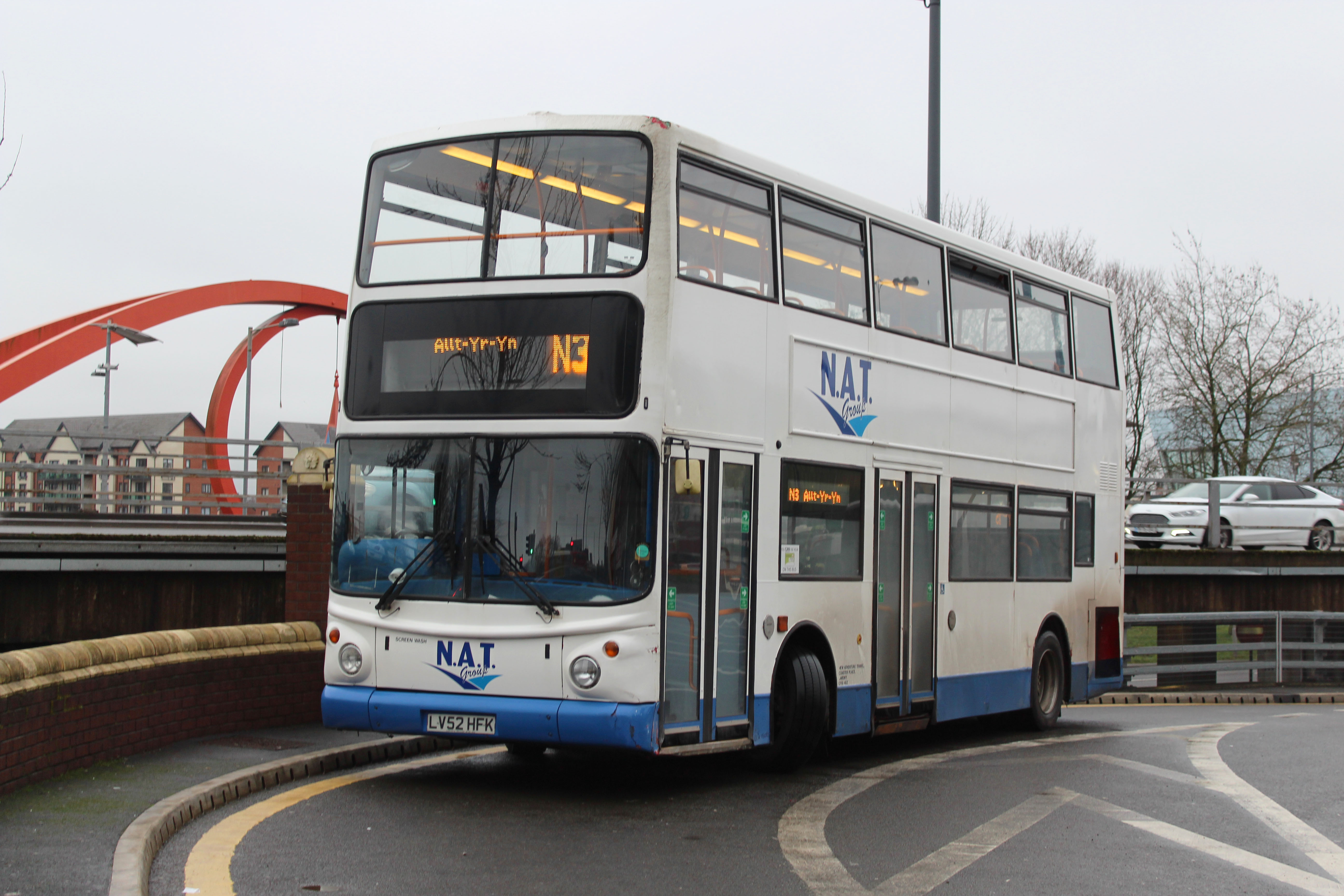
An Alexander ALX400 spotted in Newport bus station on a former service to Allt-yr-yn

Adventure Travel's headquarters are at Coaster Place in Cardiff. However, the company also operate a depot at Swansea. The group have also previously operated depots at the following locations:

=== Pontypridd ===
Since the purchase of Humphrey's Coaches in Pontypridd in 2011, AdventureTravel maintained a strong presence throughout the area establishing a network of local bus services to Ynysybwl, Glyncoch, Nantgarw, Treforest, Upper Boat, Trallwn as well as longer distance services to Bridgend and Porthcawl. After 13 years of providing bus services in Pontypridd, Adventure Travel closed the depot after a series of local authority tenders (in which the company experienced great losses) and is now used for storage for vehicles surplus to requirements.

=== Newport ===
Adventure Travel previously ran a number of commercial services to compete with Newport Bus after Adventure Travel won their school services, enabling them to run bus routes off the back of them.

Subsequently, Adventure Travel withdrew from Newport and closed its Newport depot.

=== Skewen ===
Following the purchase of Select Local Bus of Neath, Adventure Travel ran a number of ex-Select routes and vehicles from this depot. Adventure Travel has since withdrew from the Neath area and has closed its depot.

=== Abercrave ===
Adventure Travel purchased the Abercrave depot when Crossgates Coaches ceased trading. The depot was used for storage but was sold and is now closed.
