= London Buses route 312 =

London bus route

312
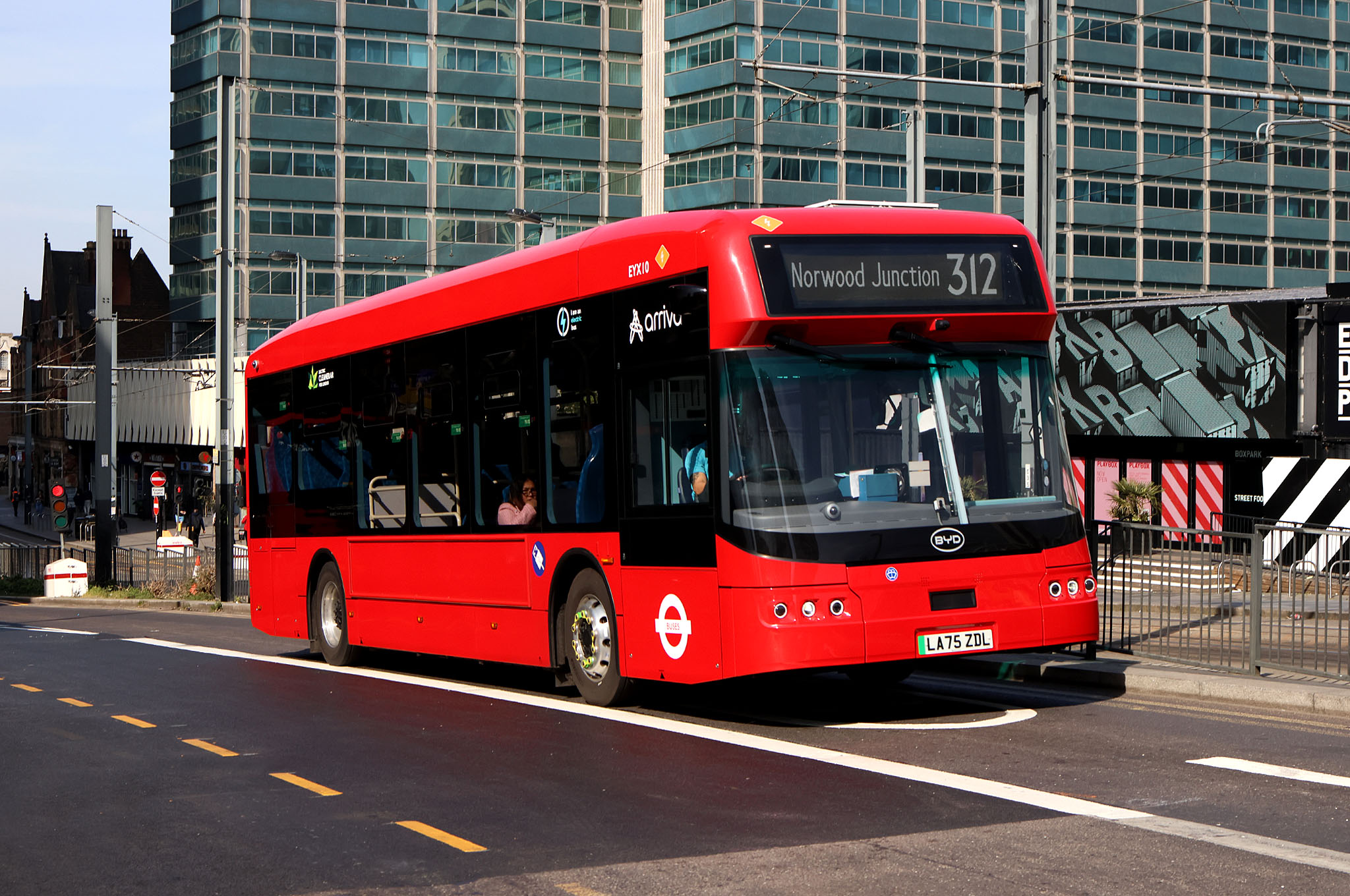
- Arriva London BYD B11 at East Croydon station in April 2026

Overview
- Operator: Arriva London
- Garage: Croydon
- Vehicle: BYD B11
- Peak vehicle requirement: 12
- Predecessors: Route 12A
- Night-time: No night service

Route
- Start: Norwood Junction station
- Via: Addiscombe; East Croydon; South Croydon
- End: Purley
- Length: 9 miles (14 km)

Service
- Level: Daily
- Frequency: About every 12-20 minutes
- Journey time: 32-63 minutes
- Operates: 04:30 until 01:32

London Buses route 312 is a Transport for London contracted bus route in London, England. Running between Norwood Junction station and Purley, it is operated by Arriva London.

== History ==
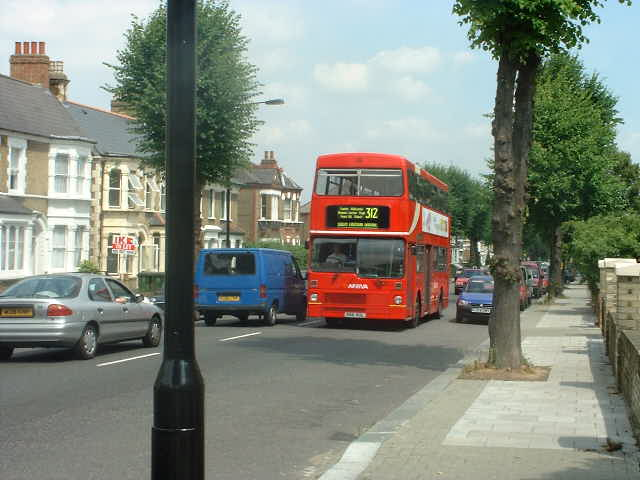
Arriva London MCW Metrobus in Dulwich in July 2000

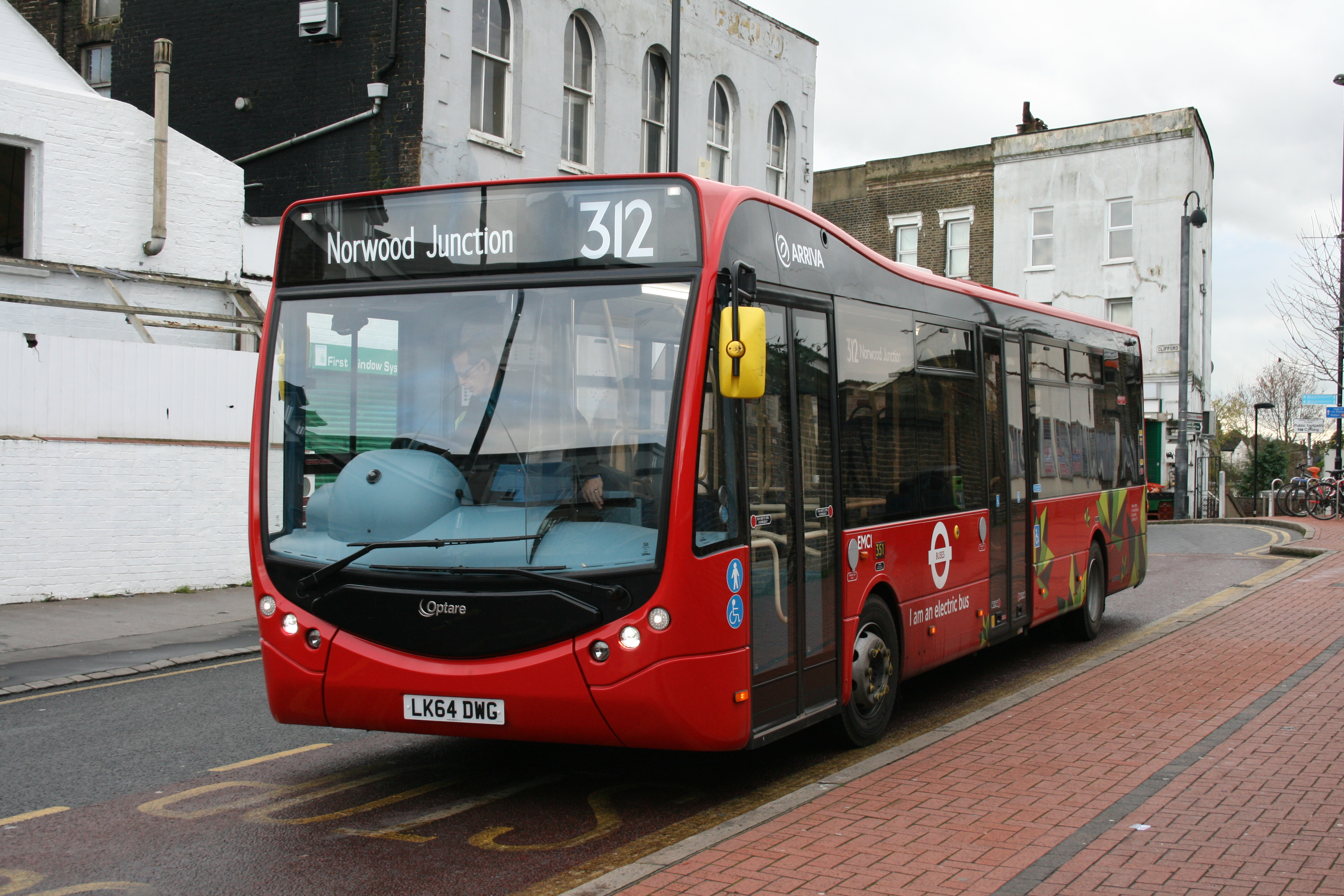
Route 312 was the first bus route in London to be operated by electric buses only. This Optare MetroCity EV was seen at Norwood Junction station in 2014.

Route 312 became the first route in London to be operated exclusively by electric buses, when Arriva London commenced a further contract on 5 September 2015 with Optare MetroCity EVs.

On 2 March 2024, the route was extended from South Croydon to Purley via Brighton Road, partially replacing route 455 which was withdrawn on the same day.

== Current route ==
Route 312 operates via these primary locations:

- Norwood Junction station
- Woodside tram stop
- Addiscombe tram stop
- East Croydon station
- Croydon town centre
- South Croydon
- Purley Oaks station
- Purley station
- Purley Tesco
- Reedham station
- Purley Old Lodge Lane
