= York park and ride =

Parking and bus service in York, England

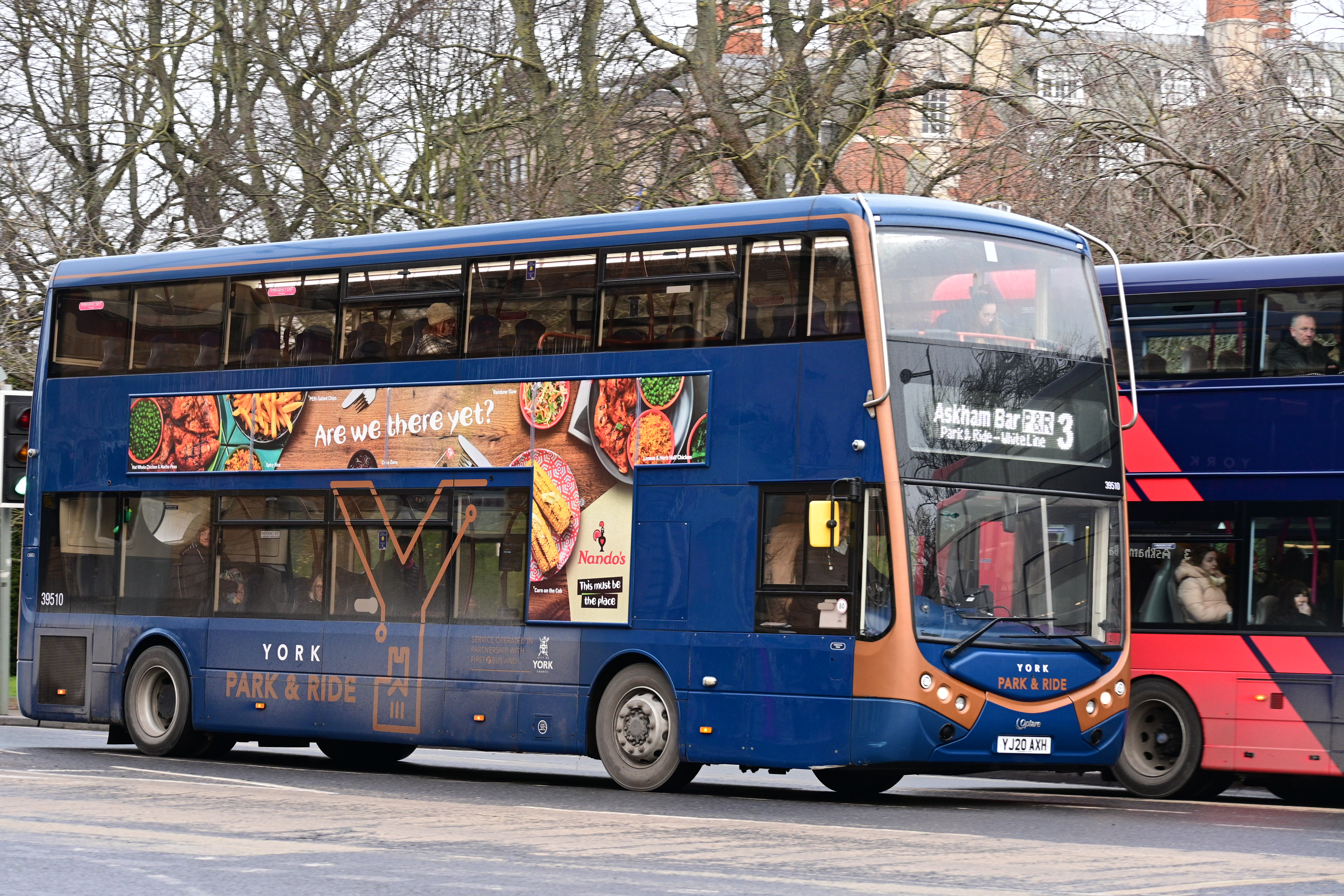
- Optare MetroDecker EV passing York railway station, March 2023
- Parent: City of York Council
- Founded: 1990; 36 years ago
- Service area: York
- Service type: Park and ride
- Routes: 7
- Hubs: 6 (Note: The park and ride network consists of six sites: Askham Bar, Grimston Bar, Monks Cross, Rawcliffe Bar, Poppleton Bar and York Designer Outlet)
- Fleet: Optare MetroDecker EV; Optare Versa EV
- Operator: First York
- Website: www.york.gov.uk/parkandride

The York park and ride is a park and ride network in the cathedral city of York, England, with sites operated by the City of York Council and bus services operated by First York. It is the largest park and ride network in the United Kingdom, with 4,970 car spaces across six sites: Askham Bar, Grimston Bar, Monks Cross, Poppleton Bar, Rawcliffe Bar and York Designer Outlet.

== History ==
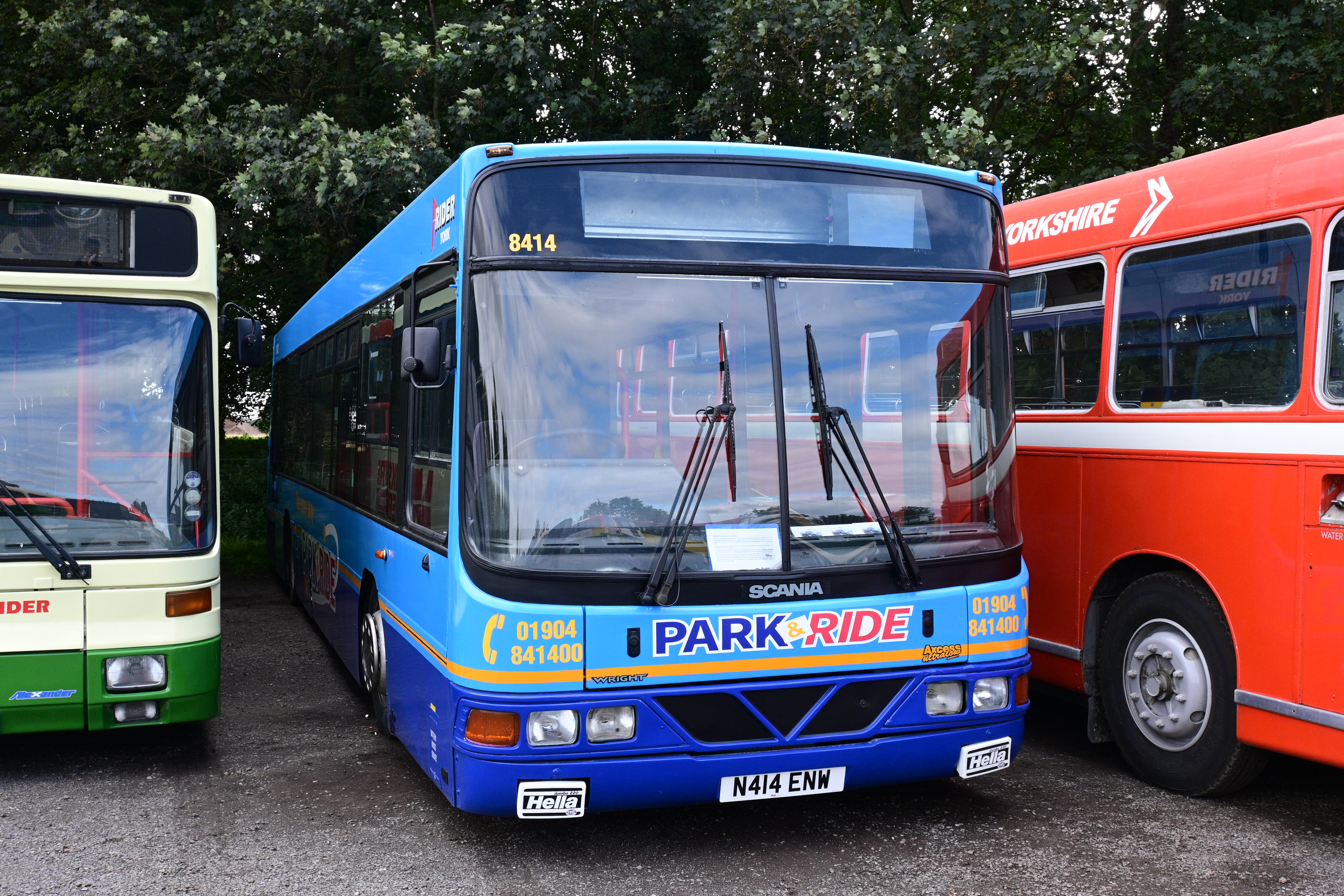
Preserved Rider York Park & Ride Wright Axcess-Ultralow in August 2023

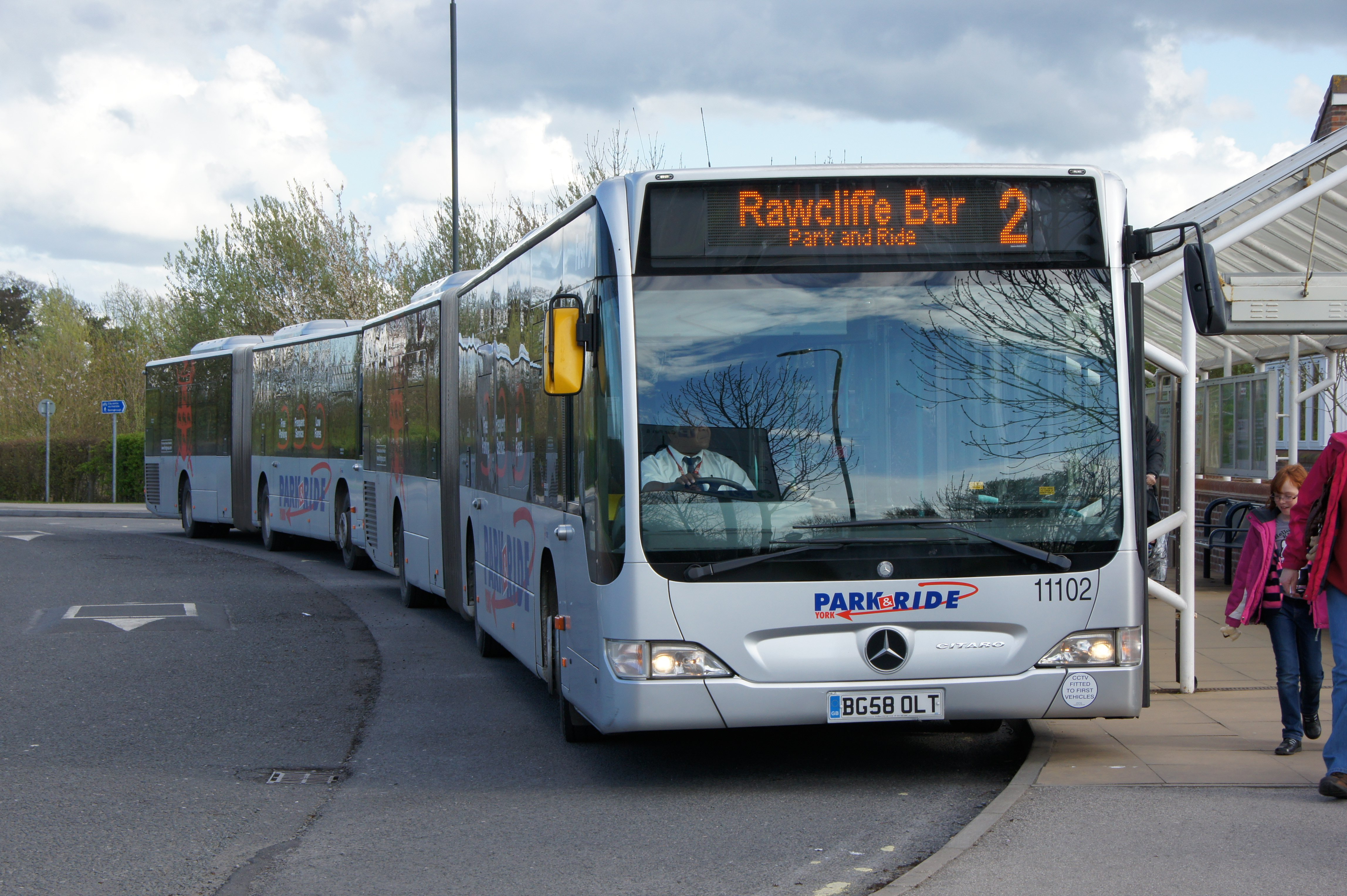
Articulated Mercedes-Benz Citaro at the Rawcliffe Bar site, April 2012

Bus services have been operated by First York, under contract to the City of York Council, since the late 1990s. In June 2016, the park and ride contract was put up for tender. However, as none of the bids met the council's criteria, First York was granted a twelve-month extension, until January 2018, with the intention of commencing a fresh tender process. In January 2018, First York was awarded a further seven-year contract to operate the park and ride network.

In June 1990, the first permanent park and ride site opened at Askham Bar. Four years later, a second site was opened at Grimston Bar, near a junction with the A64.

June 1995 saw the contract for the York Park and Ride pass from Stephensons of Easingwold to Rider York, then a subsidiary of Yorkshire Rider, after beating interest from York Pullman. With the operator gaining a five-year contract for the service, 20 new Wright Axcess-Ultralow bodied Scania L113CRLs, most branded in a designated blue livery and some being in White Flagship livery, each equipped with luggage ramps supplied from Marks & Spencer, were delivered for use on the network by the end of the year. Further deliveries of Ultralow-bodied Scanias for the service followed in 1996 and 1997.

In November 1998, the York Designer Outlet was opened, with a park and ride service commencing shortly after.

In February 2000, a 900-space site at Rawcliffe Bar commenced operation, located a junction to the A19.

In July 2004, a site was opened at Monks Cross. In 2014. services were extended to serve the nearby Vangarde Shopping Park, with fully-electric single-deck Optare Versa vehicles introduced into service the following year.

In July 2008, a fleet of 17 Wright Eclipse Urban bodied Volvo B7RLE single-deck vehicles were introduced, with 25 articulated Mercedes-Benz Citaro arriving the following year. The delivery saw the replacement of Wright Eclipse Metro bodied Volvo B7Ls and articulated Wright Eclipse Fusion bodied Volvo B7LA single-deck vehicles formerly allocated to the network, which were introduced at the turn of the decade.

In June 2014, the site at Askham Bar was expanded and relocated to a new 1,100-space site – as part of a £22 million project. In the same month, a new site was opened at Poppleton Bar, with services operated by a fleet of fully-electric Optare Versas.

Following an order in May 2019, a fleet of 21 fully-electric Optare MetroDecker double-deck vehicles were introduced into service on the park and ride network in July 2020.

The Poppleton Bar park and ride site closed in March 2020 due to the onset of the COVID-19 pandemic, with the site being used by Public Health England from April as a temporary mass testing centre throughout the pandemic. After the testing centre was closed in the summer of 2022, a bus driver shortage and a delay in funding forced the reopening of the Poppleton Bar park and ride site to be delayed until 1 April 2023. The reopening of the site was part of the City of York Council's Bus Service Improvement Plan, which was funded by a £17.36 million grant from the Department for Transport.

== Services ==
Buses operate frequently, with a frequency of up to every ten minutes (Monday–Saturday daytime). There are seven routes, each of which forms a part of First York's network of local bus services. The network operates with a flat fare (£3.00 single, £3.90 return) between all park and ride sites and the city centre, as well as offering a range of season tickets, which are valid for use on all First York services.

As of May 2026, the below park and ride bus services are operated by First York:

Route	From	To
2	York, Museum Street	Rawcliffe Bar via Clifton
2A (Note: Service 2A operates during the evening only.)	York, Museum Street	Rawcliffe Bar via Clifton
3	York, Tower Street	Askham Bar
7	York, Clifford Street	York Designer Outlet via Fulford
8	York, Piccadilly	Grimston Bar
9	York, Clifford Street	Monks Cross via Heworth
59	York, Clifford Street	Poppleton Bar

== Fleet and operations ==
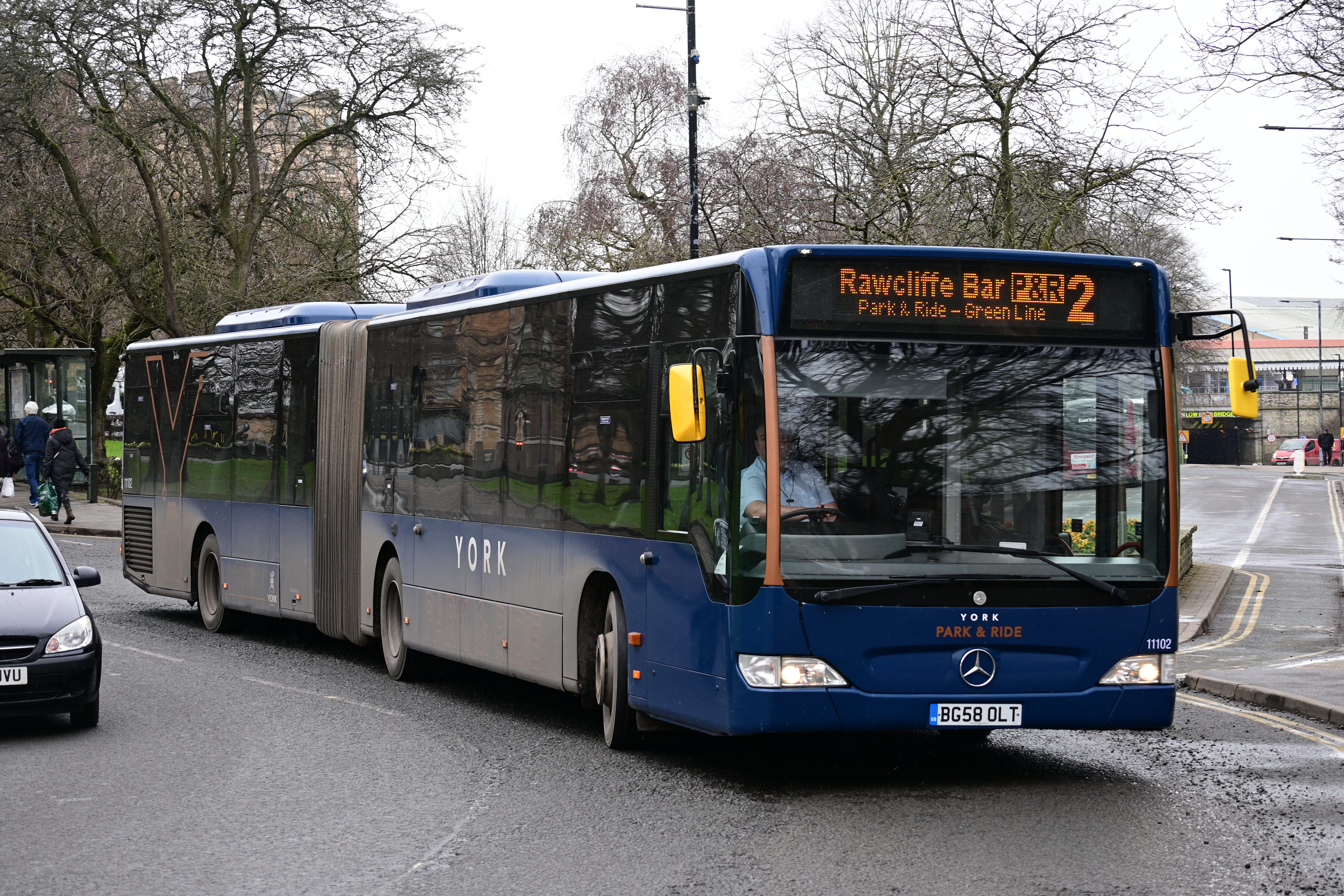
Articulated Mercedes-Benz Citaro in the rebranded livery, March 2023

As of December 2024, park and ride services are operated solely by First York, with operations based at the company's James Street depot. Vehicles are currently branded in a dedicated dark blue and gold livery.

Services are currently operated by fully-electric Optare Metrodecker double-deck and Optare Versa single-deck vehicles.

Previously, the network has been run by vehicles manufactured by Duple (Dominant), Mercedes-Benz (Citaro G), Plaxton (Supreme) and Wrightbus (Axcess-Ultralow, Eclipse (Fusion, Metro and Urban)).
