= Switch Metrocity =

Integral midibus manufactured by Switch Mobility since 2013

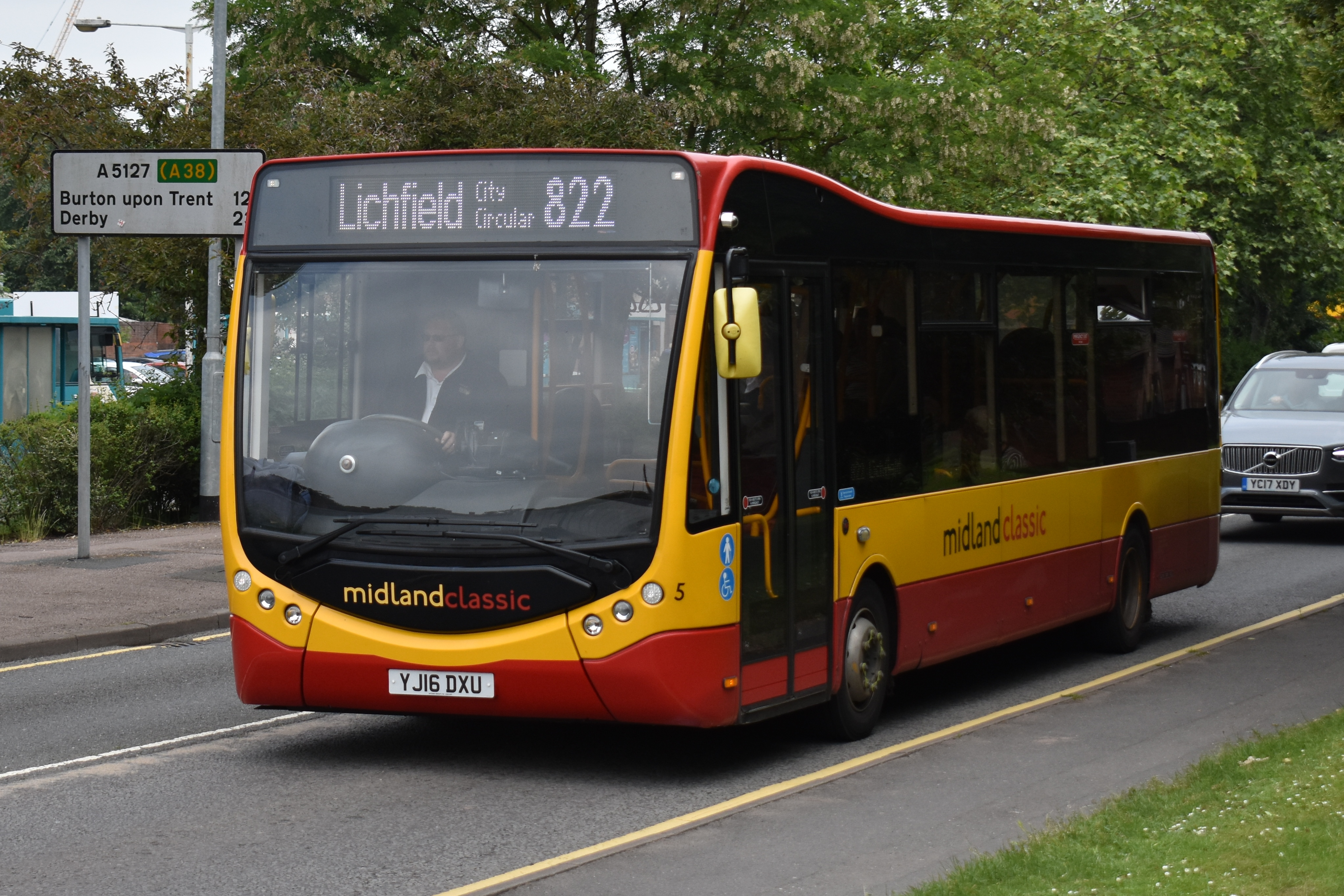
- Midland Classic Optare MetroCity in June 2018

Overview
- Manufacturer: Switch Mobility
- Production: 2013–2025

Body and chassis
- Doors: 1 or 2
- Floor type: Low floor

Powertrain
- Engine: Cummins ISBe; Mercedes-Benz OM904LA; Mercedes-Benz OM934; Magtec (electric)
- Capacity: 22–44 seated
- Transmission: Allison 2100

Dimensions
- Length: 9.9, 10.1, 10.6, 10.8 & 11.52 metres
- Width: 2.47 metres
- Height: 2.85 metres

Chronology
- Predecessor: Optare Tempo SR

The Switch Metrocity (formerly known as the Optare MetroCity) is an integral midibus manufactured by Switch Mobility since 2013. Originally aimed at the London market, the Metrocity is based on the Optare Versa which was introduced in 2009. In the UK market, longer variants of the Metrocity have replaced the Optare Tempo SR. As at August 2018, over 250 had been built.

== Variants ==
=== Diesel ===
The first prototype Optare MetroCity was delivered to London United. The MetroCity is available in five lengths, with the V990MC, V1010MC, V1060MC, V1080MC and V1152MC models measuring 9.9 m (9,900 mm), 10.13 m (10,130 mm), 10.6 m (10,600 mm), 10.82 m (10,820 mm), and 11.52 m (11,520 mm), long respectively. The shorter models were designed to replace the Optare Solo SR in London, while the longer models were to replace the Optare Versa and Optare Tempo SR in the London market. Although the Solo SR and Versa remain in production, the Tempo SR has now been entirely discontinued in the UK market with the introduction of the MetroCity due to poor sales.

=== Metrocity EV ===
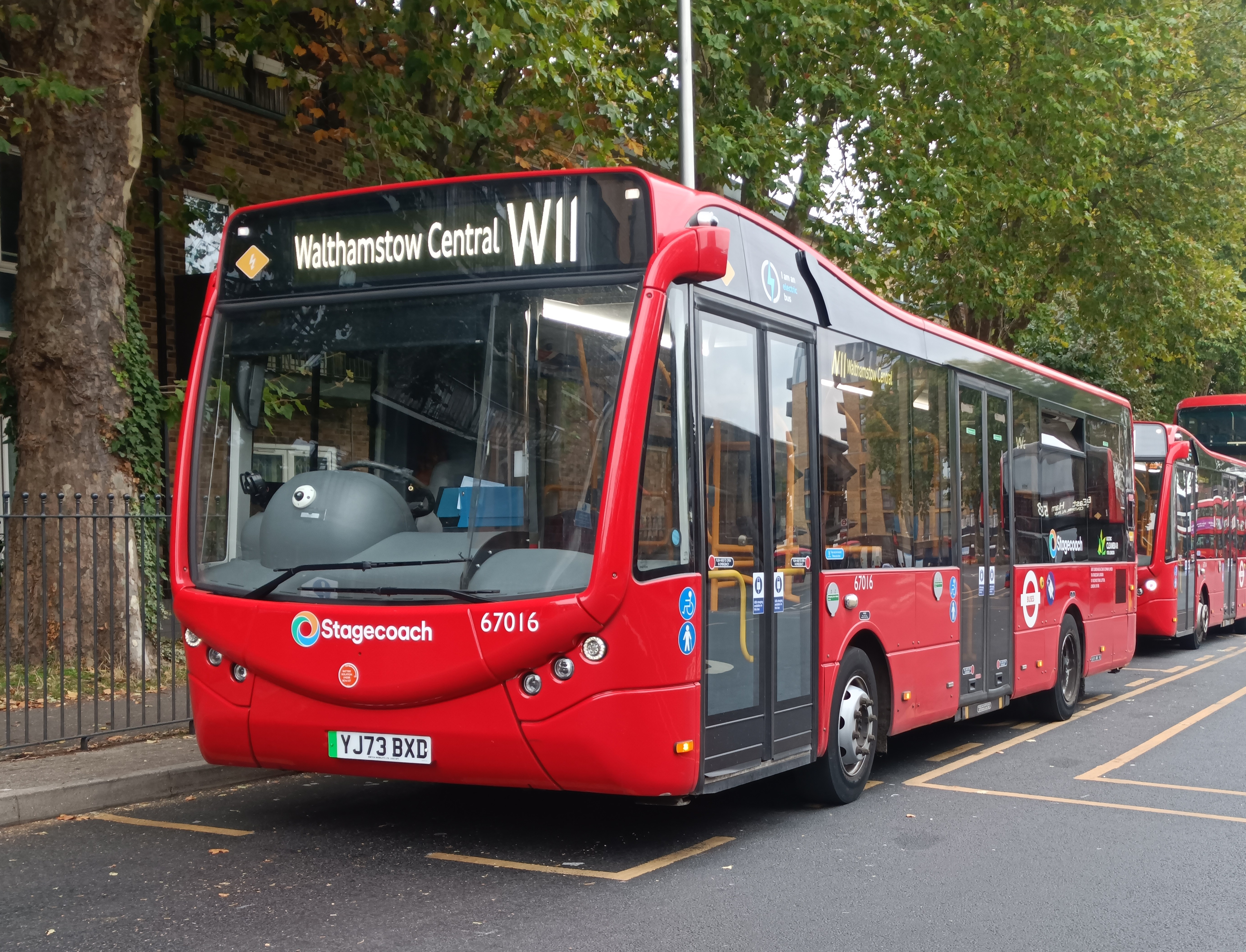
Stagecoach London MetroCity EV at Walthamstow bus station in September 2025

An electric version is available, named the Metrocity EV, using a 150 kW Magtec motor. In London, four entered service with London United in July 2014 on route H98, while nine entered service with Arriva London on route 312 in September 2015. Tower Transit ordered 12 for service on route 339 in May 2022.

A Switch Metrocity EV equipped with Fusion Processing CAVstar autonomous technology entered service with First Berkshire & The Thames Valley on a month-long trial on a service operating between Didcot Parkway railway station and the Milton Park business and technology park in September 2023.

== Operators ==
=== United Kingdom ===
London United were the launch customer for the MetroCity, taking delivery of four examples in April 2014. These were followed in May 2014 by twelve for Quality Line, who was the largest operator of the type in London until their closure in 2021. Two MetroCity EVs were delivered to Arriva London in November 2014, followed by a further seven in August 2015.

Other large orders have been made by New Adventure Travel, who received thirty diesel MetroCities, and West Coast Motors, who purchased eleven between 2016 and 2017.

=== New Zealand ===
In September 2017, Tranzit Group ordered 114 for use in Wellington.

== See also ==
- Switch Metrodecker
- List of buses
