= Optare Tempo =

Full-size rigid single-deck bus built by Optare

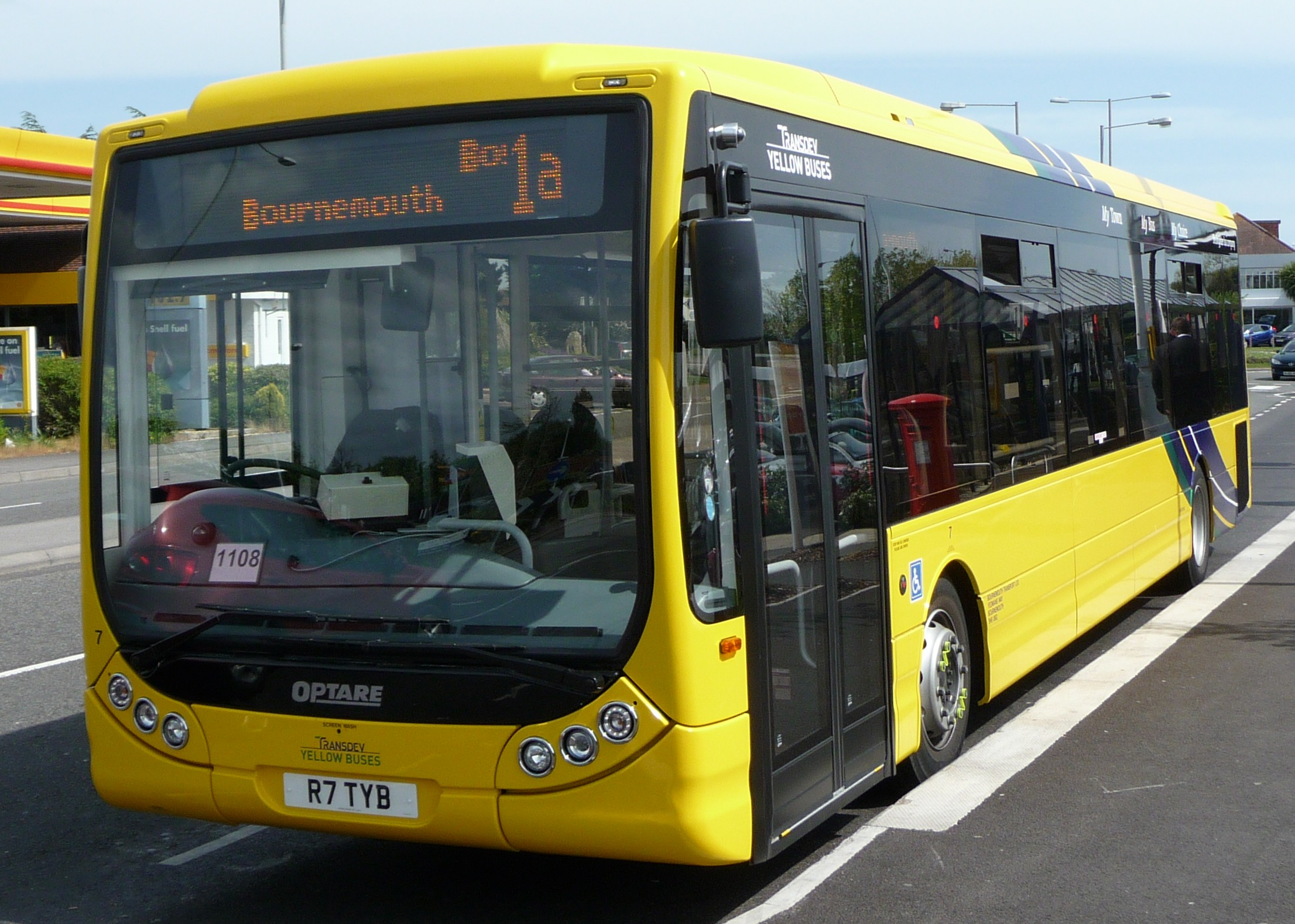
- Transdev Yellow Buses Optare Tempo in Christchurch in May 2009

Overview
- Manufacturer: Optare
- Production: 2005–2013 (Tempo); 2012–2017 (Tempo SR)

Body and chassis
- Doors: 1, 2 or 3(Tempo SR and Australia only)
- Floor type: Low floor
- Chassis: Integral

Powertrain
- Engine: Mercedes-Benz OM906LA; MAN D0836; Allison EP40/Cummins ISBe hybrid Cummins ISL (Oceania)
- Capacity: 26–47 seated
- Power output: 241bhp, 275bhp, 280bhp or 282bhp
- Transmission: Allison; ZF

Dimensions
- Length: 10.6, 11.3, 12.0, 12.2, 12.6 & 12.7 metres
- Width: 2.50 metres
- Height: 3.03 metres
- Curb weight: 9,720 kg (21,430 lb) (unladen)

Chronology
- Predecessor: Optare Excel
- Successor: Switch E1; Optare MetroCity

The Optare Tempo is an integral low-floor, heavy duty, full-size rigid single-deck bus manufactured by Optare, launched in late 2004 as the replacement for the Optare Excel. It is designed as a lightweight bus, to use less fuel than traditional heavy duty integral rigids. As of July 2017, 233 had been built, including 27 Tempo SRs. The Tempo SR has since been replaced in the UK market by longer variants of the Optare MetroCity, although production of the Tempo SR continues for the Australian market.

== Tempo ==
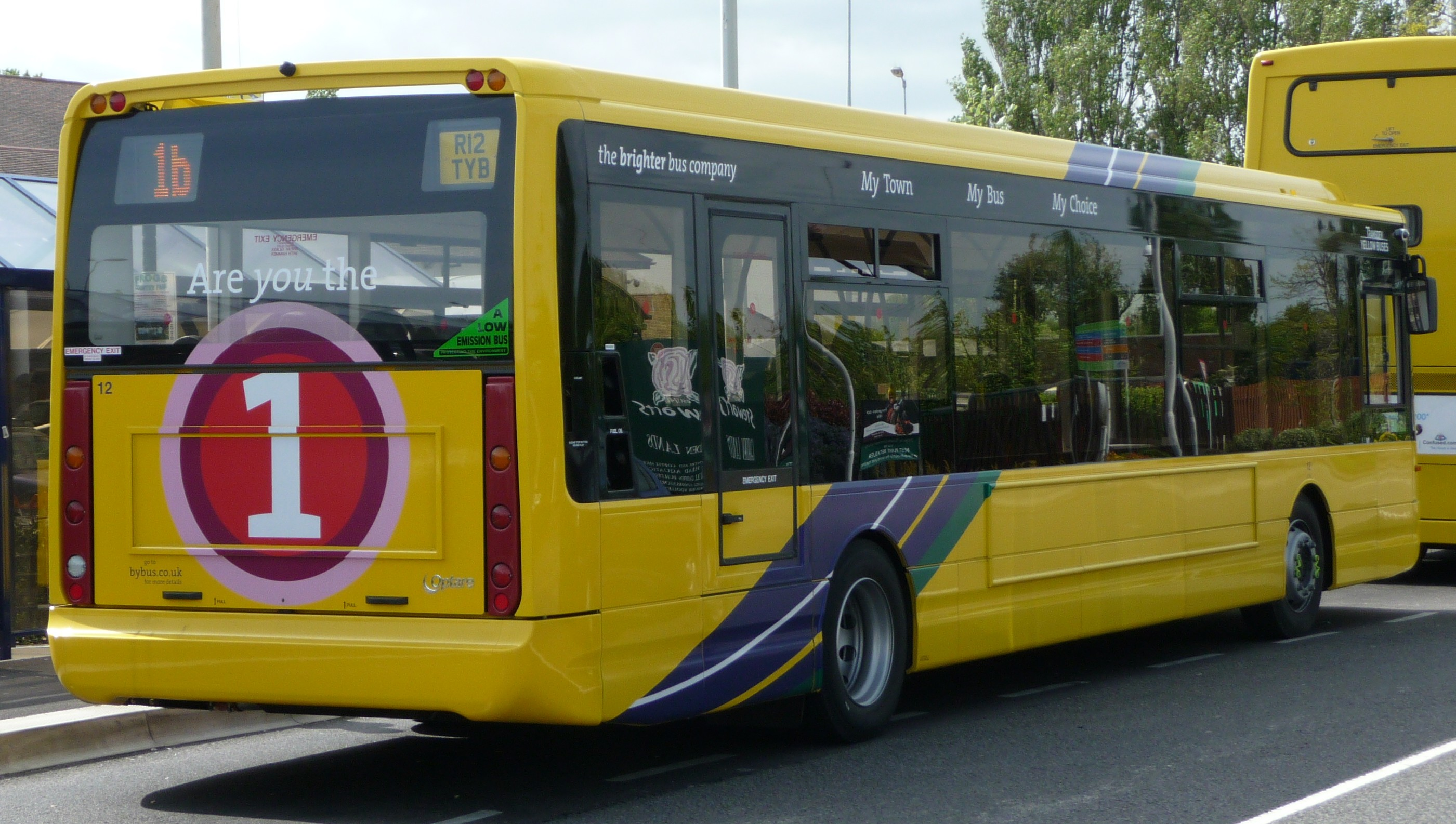
Rear of a Tempo, operated by Transdev Yellow Buses in Bournemouth.

The Optare Tempo was launched in October 2004 after the building of two pre-production prototypes (both of which saw use as demonstrators and subsequently public service); one an example of the longest available (12.6 metres), the other an example of the shortest (10.6 metres), with the first production example (12.0 metres) delivered to Trentbarton in February 2005. It came in four different lengths: 10.6 (X1060), 11.3 (X1130), 12.0 (X1200) and 12.6 (X1260) metres and it has a raised roofline in the middle continuously to the rear roof spoiler instead of an arched top. Tempos were to be built in Optare's Cross Gates, Leeds factory (since relocated).

Optare constructed the Tempo as an all welded heavy-duty box section 'one-piece' integral (unconventionally for the time) from stainless and carbon steel dressed in a mix of GFRP (fibreglass) and aluminium modular exterior panels with sleek bonded glazing (no gasketted), integrating easy maintenance features like swing out headlamp clusters and multiple LED lamps. Key mechanical services are installed on a demountable frame, connected with "no-loss" couplings. Detailed analysis and computer modelling of the design and any impacts of stresses it would see in service were undertaken by finite element analysis firm Analysis by Firth, based in Wigan, UK. The resulting bus underwent testing at the Millbrook Proving Ground.

Lynx fully refurbished former Yellow Buses bespoke Optare Tempo from 2009, featuring novelties like Esteban Civic V3 seats, LED saloon uplighting and Versa partitions

Achieving interior space comparable to buses 2.55 metres wide (at 2.5 metres wide) with a 900 mm (0.90 m) wide aisle between the front wheel arches, interior amenities offered included an optimised sound insulation package (Tempos were demonstrably up to 5dB(a) quieter at 40mph than contemporary rivals), ambient saloon uplighting, cantilevered seating, luggage pens, tinted single or double bonded glazing, parcel racks, tables, climate control, power outlets and AV systems amongst others. Tempo cabs, set for an optimal driver/passenger height, include a steering column with telescopic tilt and reach and later Optare's computerised 'EcoDrive' gauge pod with TFT. Produced in collaboration with Actia, the revised dashboard incorporates telematics analysis with the ability to alert both the driver and operator in realtime (latter over the internet) to fuel consumption, maintenance issues and driving style.

Tempos were originally powered by a Euro III Mercedes-Benz OM906LA engine (upgraded to Euro IV and V compliance with Adblue and SCR technology), with a Euro IV MAN D0836 EGR engine option later introduced (both 6 cylinder), coupled to a ZF 6HP500 Ecomat 2 six-speed automatic transmission as standard or optionally an Allison T310R five-speed automatic transmission. The rear Rába drive axle was engineered to be smoother and quieter, with 4 air suspension bags. ZF steering gear is implemented through a MAN drop centre low-floor front axle suspended on a further two air bags (with electronic kneeling capabilities). Initially utilising (air-operated) anti-lock drum brakes, by 2007 these were bettered with all-round anti-lock disk brakes, requiring a switch to a Meritor rear axle and alternate MAN front axle.

Turning circles are 7,905mm for the X1060, 8,900mm for the X1130, 9,895mm for the X1200 (beating the shorter ADL Enviro200 MMC at 11,800mm) and 10,763mm for the X1260 model.

Also in 2007, a hybrid version was introduced for London operators, utilising a "fully proven" and "fully reliable" Allison EP40 Parallel Hybrid drive system powered by removable NiMH batteries combined with a Cummins 250 hp ISBe Euro V SCR engine. This technology was integrated into ten 10.6 metre variants, which also featured Transport for London spec double doors, leaving space for 28 seats. Furthermore, the brochure proudly declares that full electric, bio-methane dual fuel, pure plant oil or used cooking oil drivelines were available, designed to fit in the same space.

The Optare Tempo has stopped production and was replaced with the Optare Tempo SR.

== Tempo SR ==
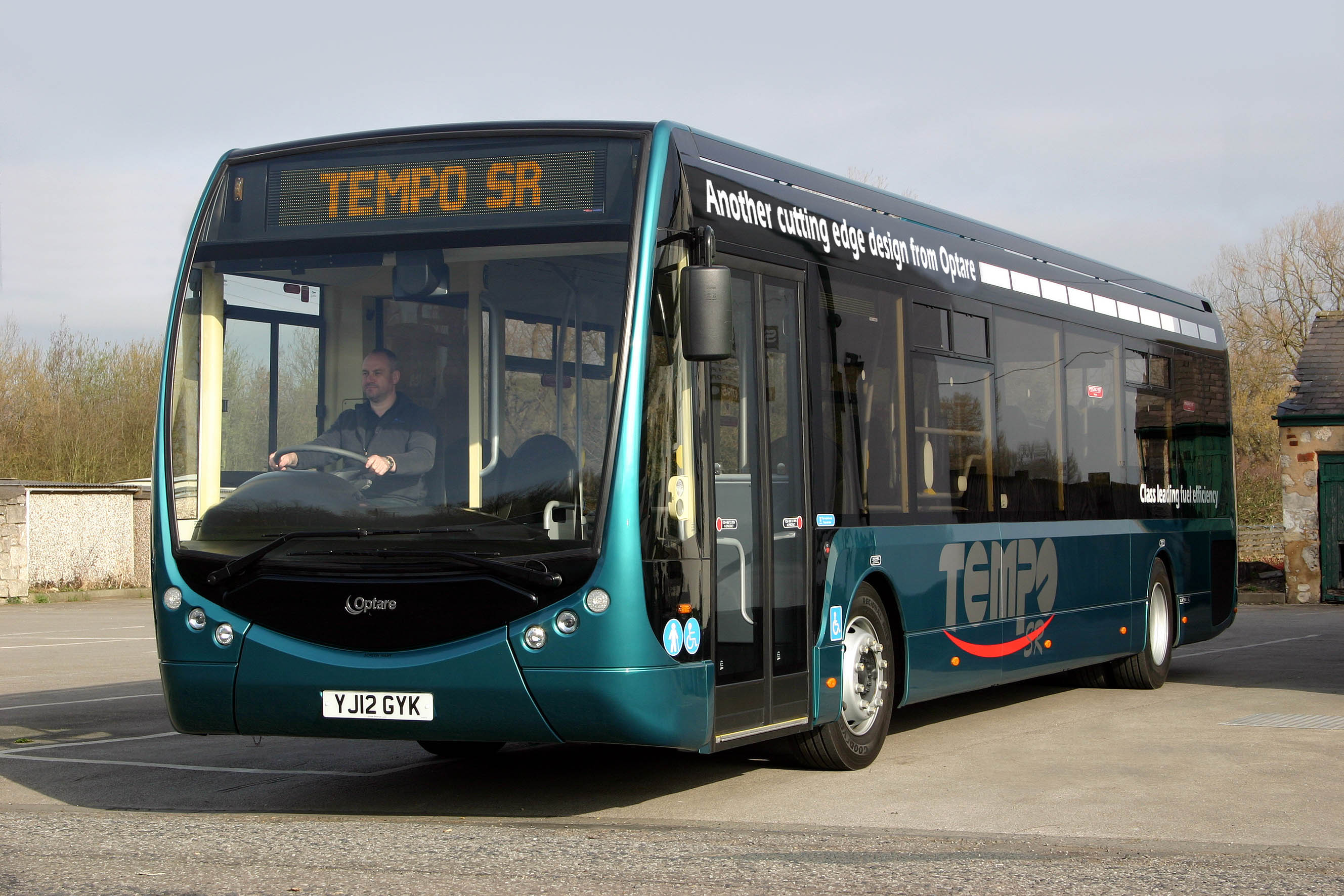
Tempo SR Demonstrator

In October 2011, a restyled version was launched as the Tempo SR, borrowing from the Solo's naming convention. The Tempo SR came in three different lengths: 10.6, 11.3 and 12.0 metres and incorporated a Mercedes-Benz OM906LA six-cylinder 210 kW (282 bhp) SCR engine, which continued to be housed on a removable cradle alongside the transmission (the MAN engine option being dropped). A notable reversal on the original design, ZF's 6HP500 six-speed transmission could be specified as an alternative to the now standard Allison T310R gearbox – both of which feature integral retarders.

Trentbarton, then having a long and close relationship with Optare, sparked the facelift of the Tempo to be "fundamentally different to anything else on the market". Between Trentbarton, transport design and branding agency Best Impressions (led by Ray Stenning) and Optare -featuring suggestions and ideas from Nottingham-area bus users- the Tempo SR was born.

The finalised bus was unveiled at Coach & Bus Live 2011, and marketed as "the new bus for Nottingham". Indeed, the vehicle exhibited wasn't a prototype or demonstrator but a to-spec, fully 'i4' liveried fleet member for Trent Barton. Stenning reflected that the design "has a natural flow and every line has a purpose" and it wasn't "tarting it up for the sake of it". The design reportedly drew on inspiration from Stenning's 'design heroes' Raymond Loewy and Pininfarina, with close attention paid to details. Trentbarton would take delivery of thirteen examples between May and July 2012.

Despite Trentbarton proclaiming their redesign was "taking the transport industry by storm", the vehicle proved divisive. For instance, although the same framework underneath, and constructed using the same methods, (even sharing concurrent chassis numbers with the original) operators contracted by the Welsh government continued to order the original Tempo even though the SR facelift had been out for over a year (albeit an order for a discontinued size, 12.60 metres). Following poor sales, the Tempo SR has now been replaced in the UK market by longer variants of the Optare MetroCity. However, Manchester Airport took delivery of a further four Tempo SRs in May 2017 for use on airport car park shuttle bus operations; these buses came from an order intended for an Australian operator, which was cancelled. As of October 2018, Trent Barton has replaced all Tempo SRs with Alexander Dennis Enviro200 MMCs, which now operate the i4 service.

Tempo SRs built for Oceania can also be optioned with an 8.9 litre Cummins ISL euro V engine.

As of early 2019, municipal bus operator Ipswich Buses have purchased all 13 ex-Trentbarton Optare Tempo SRs.

== Operators ==
=== United Kingdom ===
Arriva UK Bus, First Cymru, RATP Group, Stagecoach Group, Transdev, Veolia Transport and Wellglade Group all have been purchasers of the original Tempo, not to mention several independent operators. The first six production Tempos were delivered to Trentbarton in February 2005, five of which were branded for the operator's 'xprss' service between Nottingham and Bingham, while the sixth was branded for the Radcliffe Lines network of services. A further six were delivered to Konectbus for use on the Costessey park and ride service in Norwich.

Tempos were additionally delivered to Transport for London operators East London, London United and Metroline, while Tempo SRs were purchased by Trentbarton and Manchester Airport, though Ipswich Buses are now their biggest UK operator, having taken on Trent Barton's fleet. Lynx of King's Lynn are now the largest operators of the Tempo in the world, having purchased large numbers of vehicles second-hand.

=== Europe ===
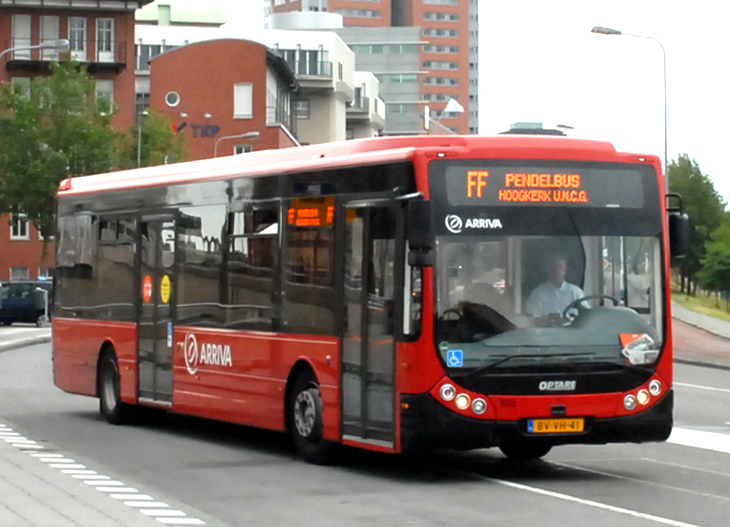
Arriva Netherlands Optare Tempo in July 2009

One 36 seat left hand drive Optare Tempo X1200 was exported to Kiel, Germany in 2007. Beginning with KVG in Kiel, Germany as 713, registered KI-EL 7713, in 2010 it moved to Groningen, Netherlands where it was re-registered BV-VH-41 and operated by Arriva as fleet no. 1002, before returning to Germany a year later; namely Saarlouis registered WND-P 86 until around 2014 when it finally served in Bayreuth with Heserbus GmbH as BT-OS 1010. According to records sometime afterward it ended up in Coburg for spares.

=== Australia ===
In Australia, Tempos have been purchased by Carbridge and Park Ridge Transit.
