= Optare Versa =

Low-floor midibus manufactured by Optare

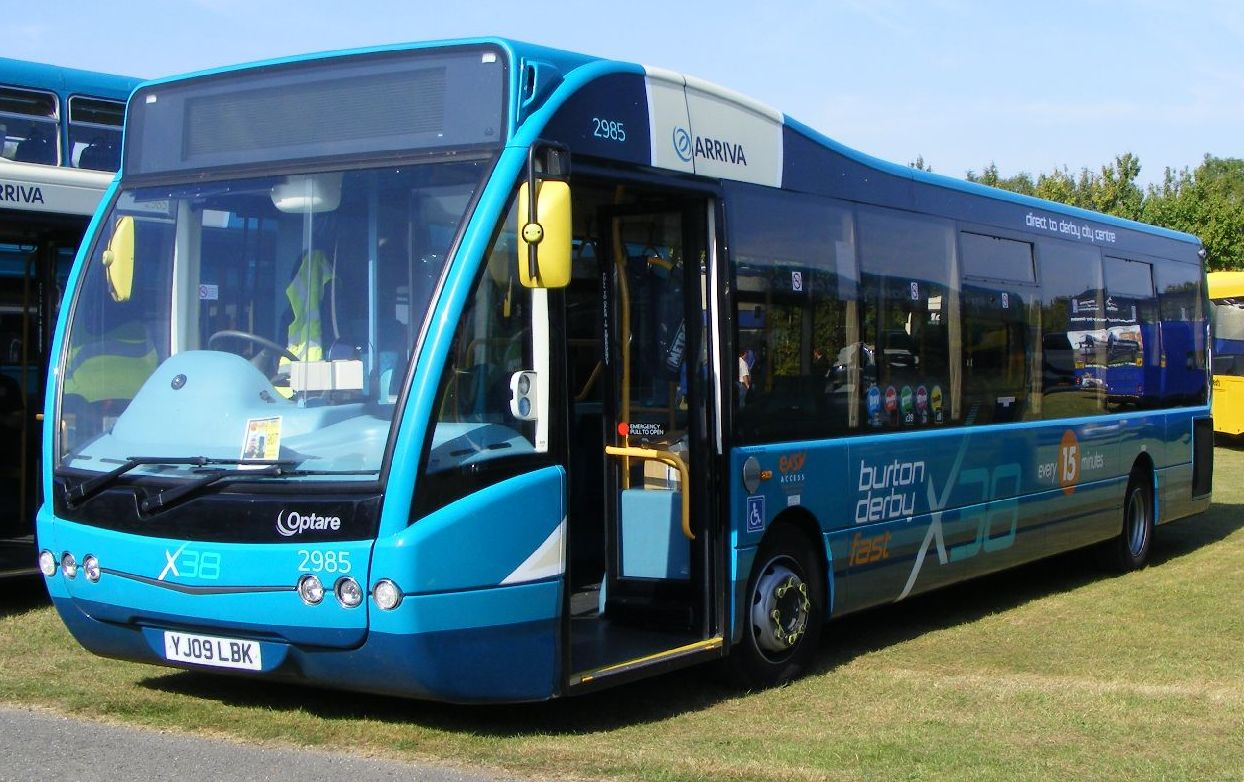
- Arriva Midlands Versa at Showbus Rally in 2009 (pre-facelift)

Overview
- Manufacturer: Optare
- Production: 2007–2018

Body and chassis
- Doors: 1 or 2
- Floor type: Low floor (outside UK); Low entry (inside UK)

Powertrain
- Engine: Cummins ISBe; MAN; Mercedes-Benz OM904
- Capacity: 36-57 seated
- Transmission: Allison 2100

Dimensions
- Length: 10,400 to 12,100 mm (34 ft 1 in to 39 ft 8 in)
- Width: 2,510 mm (8 ft 3 in)
- Height: 2,840 mm (9 ft 4 in)

Chronology
- Successor: Switch E1

The Optare Versa is a low-floor midibus that was manufactured by Optare at its Sherburn-in-Elmet factory. In total 883 were produced between 2007 and 2018.

== Description ==
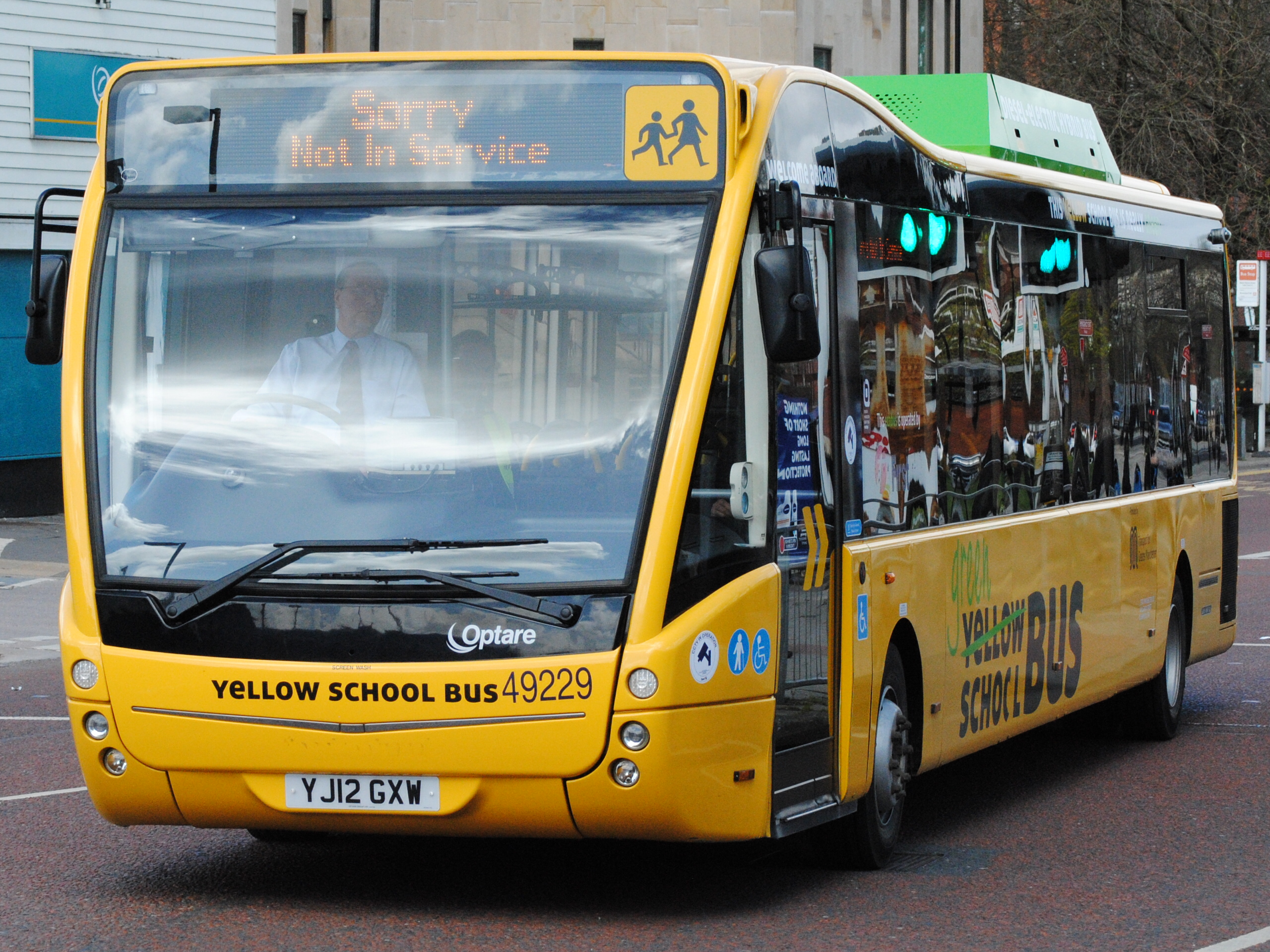
First Manchester Optare Versa Hybrid in April 2013 (second facelift)

Optare designed the Versa to fill a gap in its bus product range between the larger Tempo full-size single-decker bus and the smaller Solo minibus. Some operators of the longest of Optare's minibus-derived Solo models commented that the 7,000 mm wheelbase was too long, reducing manoeuvrability, which resulted from the Solo's front axle being ahead of the passenger entrance. It was officially launched at the Euro Bus Expo 2006 at the National Exhibition Centre, Birmingham in November 2006, with the first order of 25 buses being placed by Stagecoach.

The Versa, with its entrance ahead of the front axle, considerably reduces the wheelbase, to either 5,130 mm or 5,820 mm (depending upon whether the overall length is 10,300 mm or 11,000 mm respectively). It is designed to seat between 36 and 40 passengers. The Versa has a typical Optare design, with a swooping roof line, large glazed area and swept-back front which takes many of its styling cues from the Solo, but with a more modern, updated appearance.

=== Discontinuation ===
Following the restructuring of Optare in November 2020 and the launch of Switch Mobility the Versa was dropped from Optare's line-up in favour of the Metrocity. The last Versas were built in 2018.

== Hybrid electric version - Optare Versa Hybrid ==
In 2010, a hybrid electric version was introduced with the first 68 ordered by Transport for Greater Manchester. Of these, 20 were introduced on the FirstBus operated Metroshuttle routes in November 2010, while others were operated by Maytree Travel.

== Electric version - Optare Versa EV ==
In 2012, an electric version was introduced with Travel DeCourcey ordering three in 2010, entering service on the Coventry Park & Ride. The Park and Ride trend was continued with First York purchasing 12 for its York Park & Ride services between 2014 and 2015. Transport for Greater Manchester introduced three on its Metroshuttle services.

== Operators ==
=== United Kingdom ===
The first Optare Versas entered service in October 2007 with Arriva Shires & Essex. Arriva, FirstGroup, Go-Ahead Group, Rotala, Yorkshire Tiger, Stagecoach Group, Wellglade Group, Transdev Blazefield and Translink Northern Ireland (37 buses) have all been purchasers. It has been operated by Transport for London operators East London, London United, NSL Buses, Quality Line and Selkent. The Versa has proved popular with independent operators - such as Fleet Buzz - particularly in East Anglia, in the North West of England and also in Wales.

=== Australasia ===
In New Zealand Reesby Buses have purchased three Versas from the Optare. They are joined by Ritchies Transport Holdings, who purchased 7 from Nottingham City Transport in England in late 2013.

=== India ===
An electric Optare Versa was exhibited at the Bus and Special Vehicles Show in Delhi in 2015.

== Gallery ==
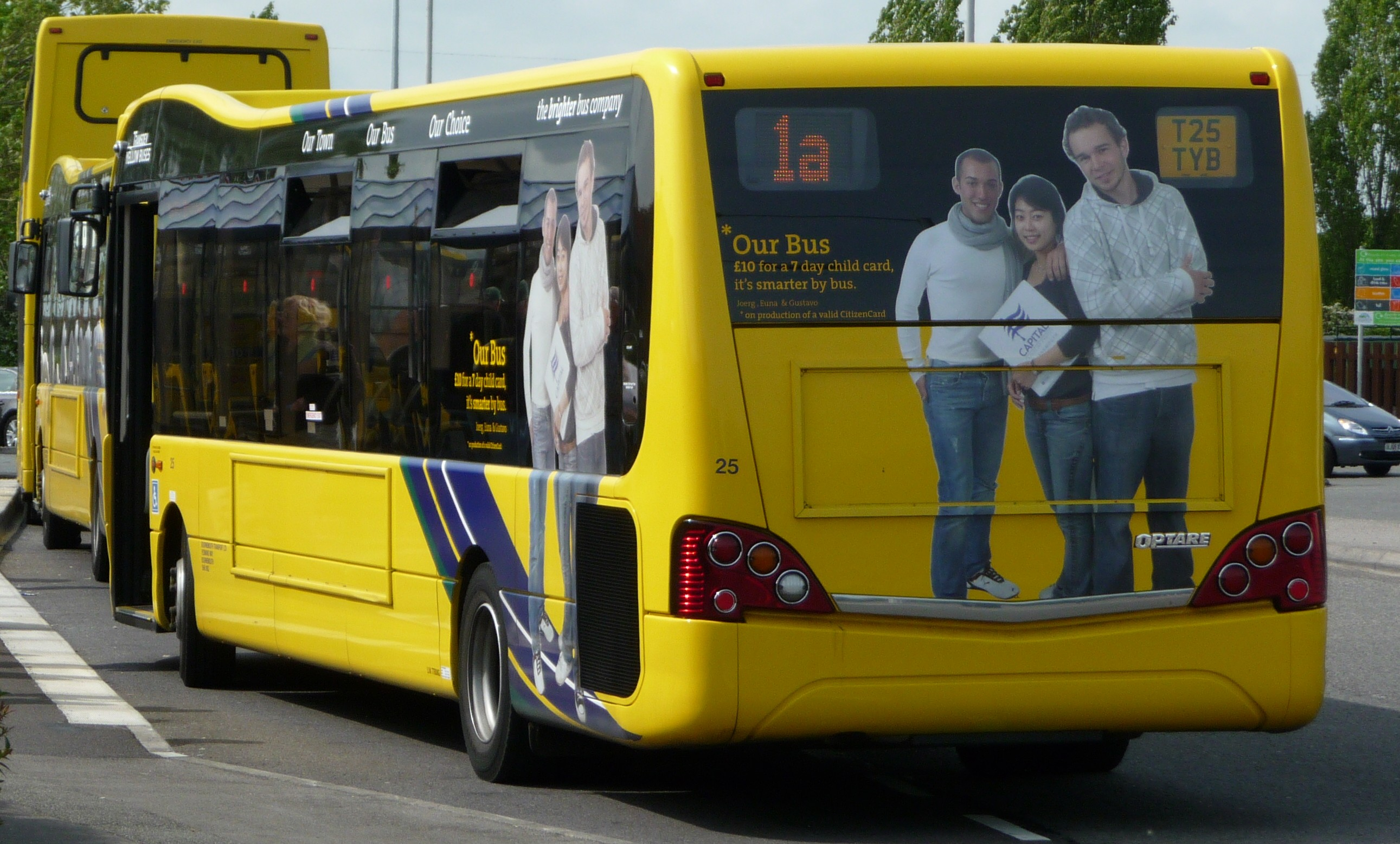
Transdev Yellow Buses Optare Versa rear in May 2009. This vehicle is now in service with D&G Bus of Stoke-on-Trent.

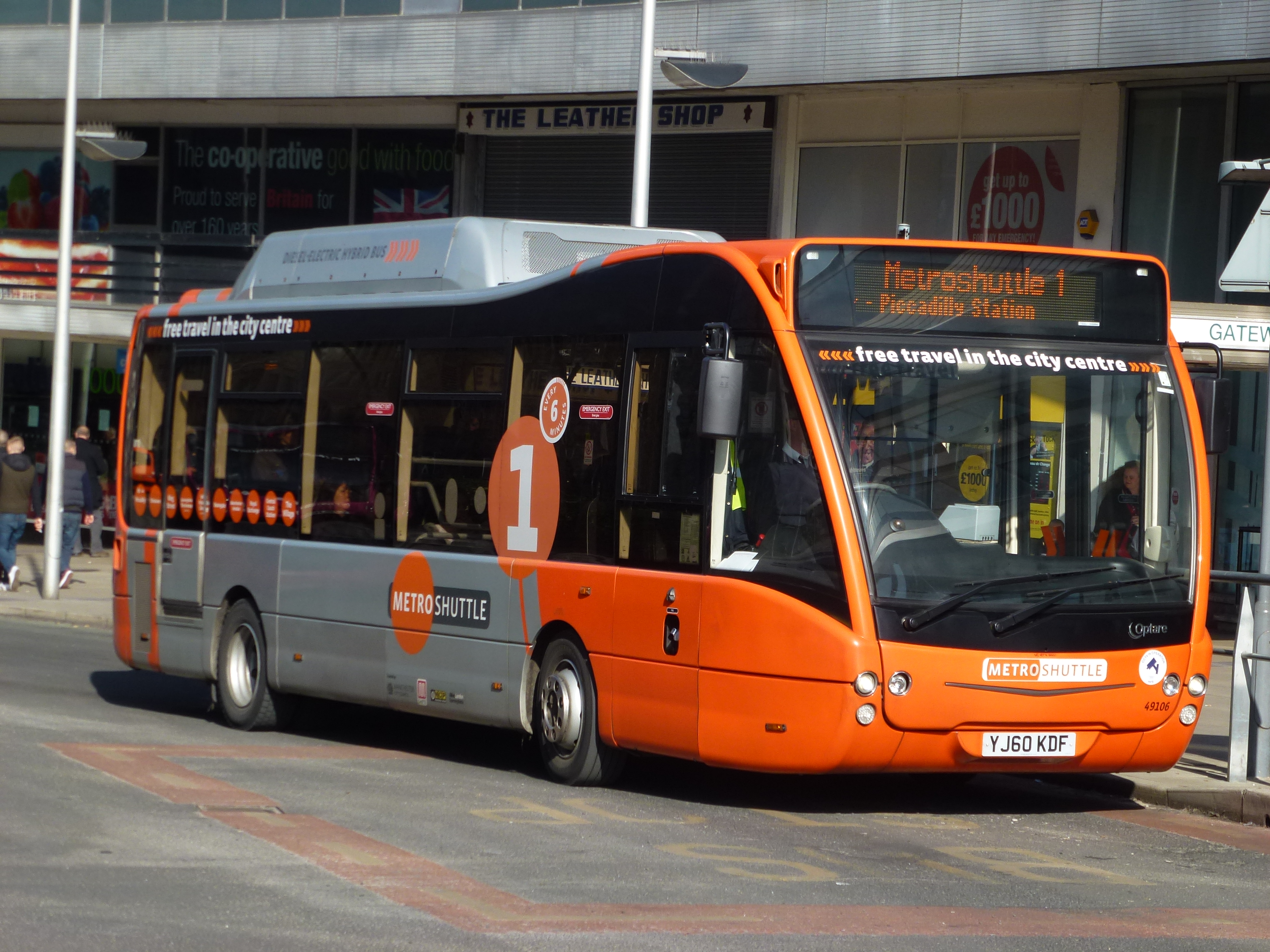
First Greater Manchester Metroshuttle liveried Versa Hybrid (first facelift) at Manchester Piccadilly station in March 2012.

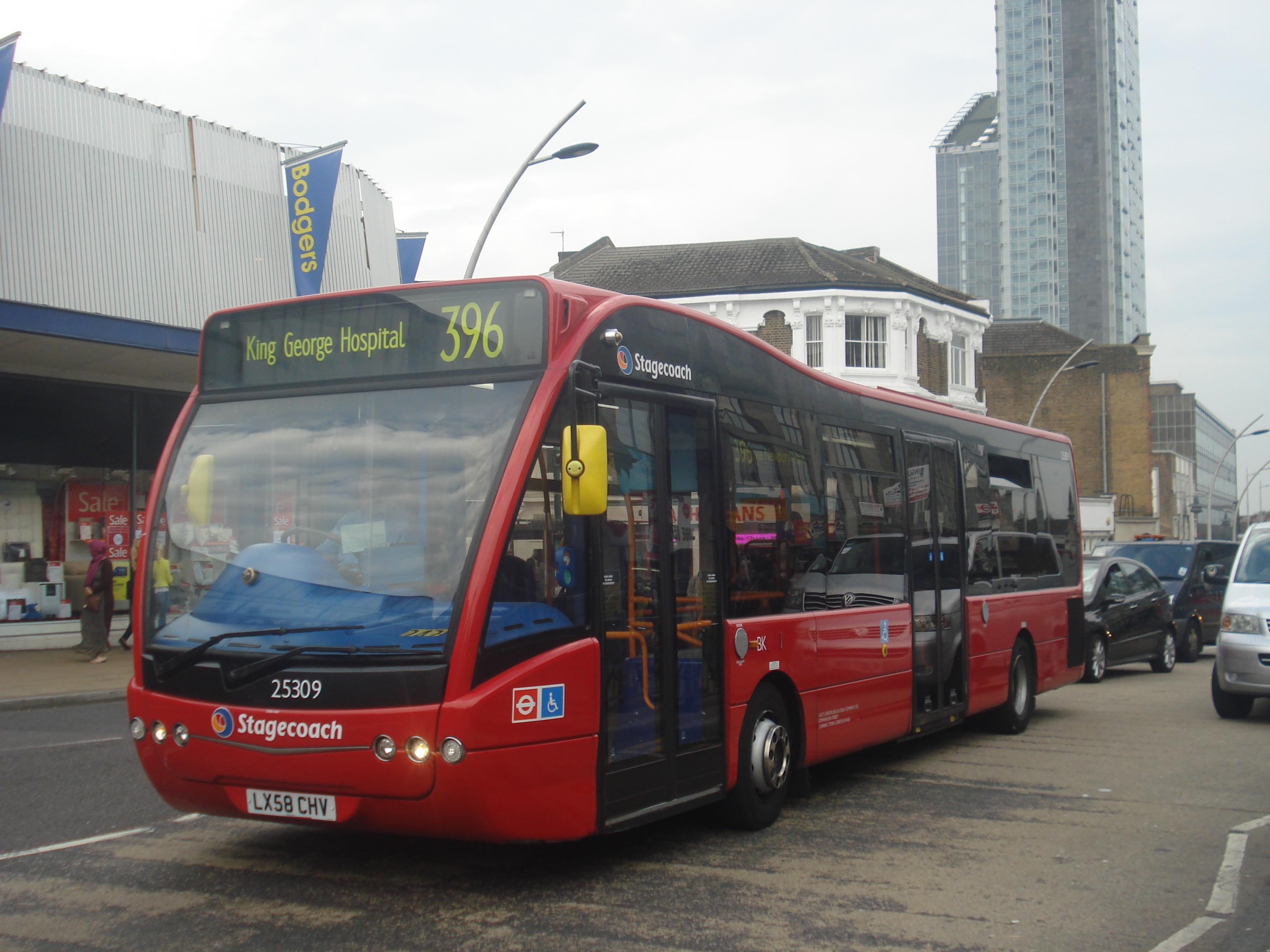
Stagecoach London Optare Versa in London in September 2013.

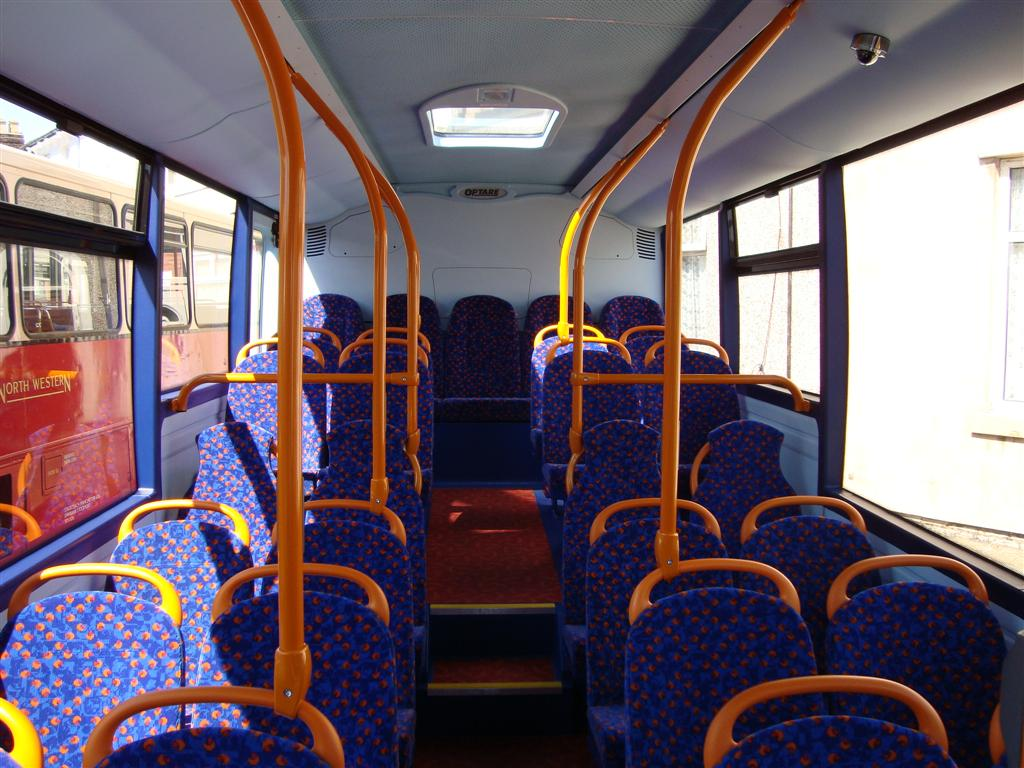
Stagecoach North West Optare Versa interior.

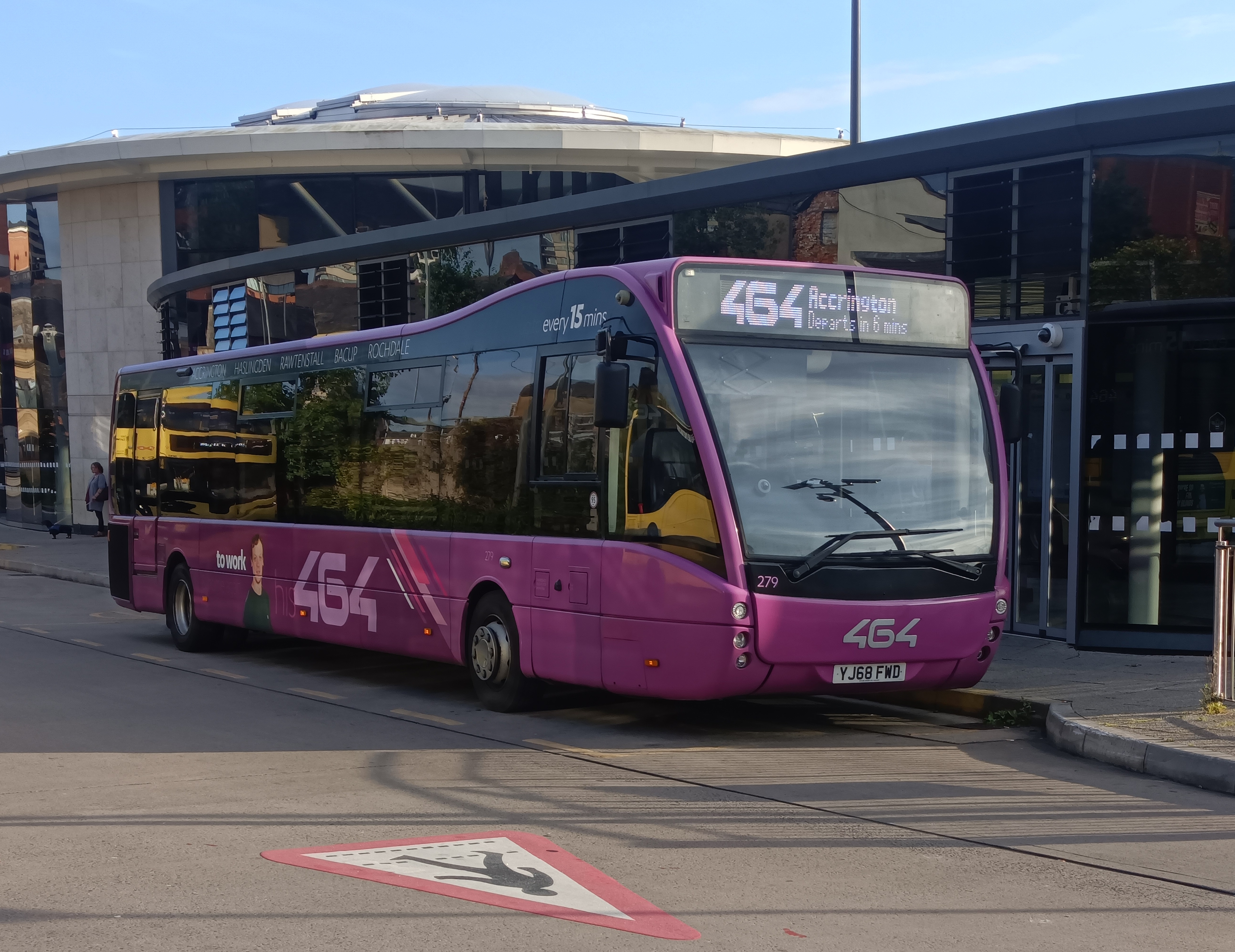
Rosso Optare Versa (second facelift) on route 464 at Rochdale Interchange, July 2025.

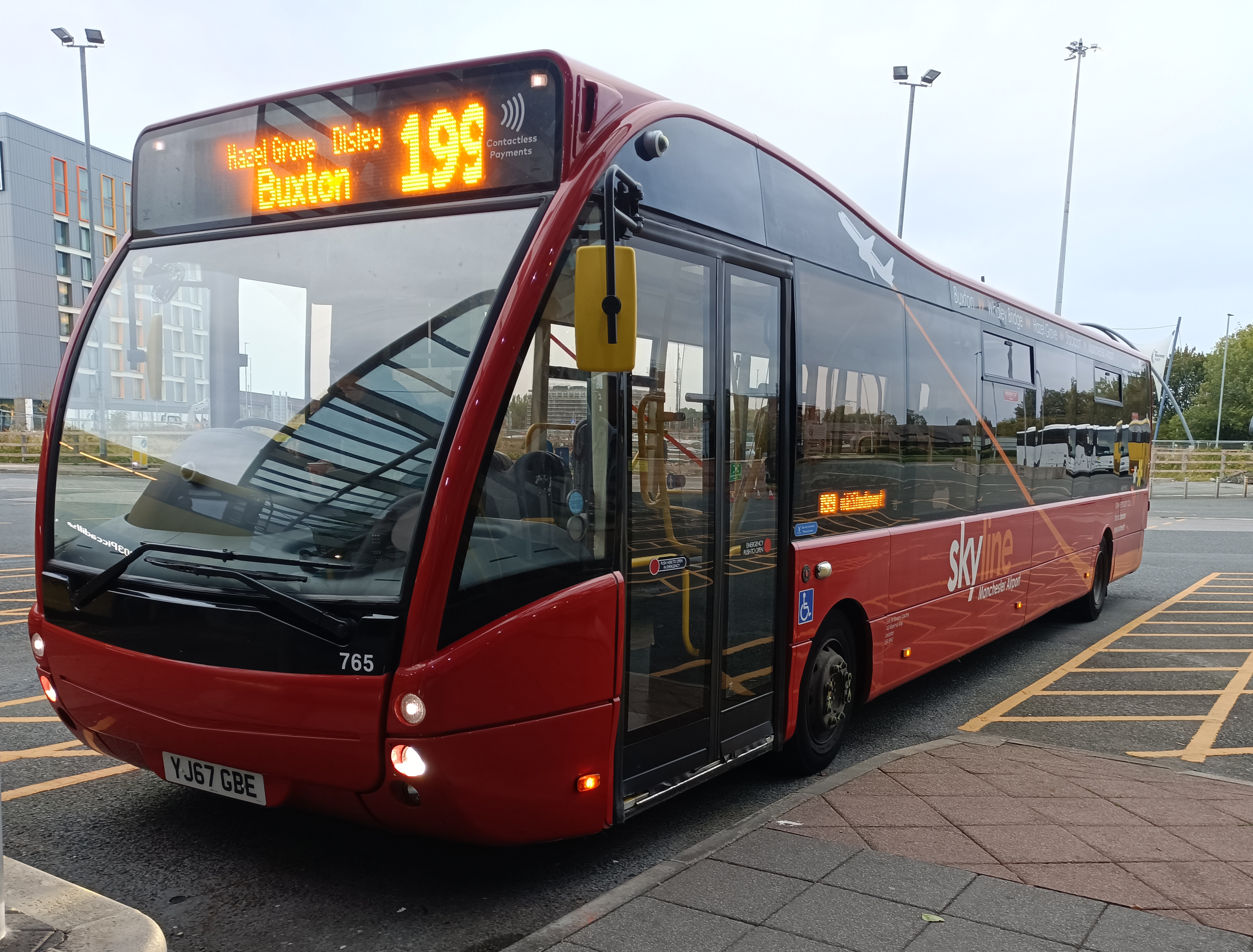
High Peak Buses Optare Versa (second facelift) on skyline 199 at Manchester Airport in October 2025.
