= Solera (disambiguation) =

Solera is a process for aging liquids.

Solera may also refer to:

== People ==
- Daniela Solera (born 1997), Costa Rican footballer
- Fernando Baudrit Solera (1907–1975), Costa Rican jurist and academic
- Temistocle Solera (1815–1878), Italian opera composer and librettist

== Other ==
- Ferqui Solera, motor vehicle
- Solera Holdings, American company
- Solera de Gabaldón, municipality in Spain

== See also ==
- El Soleràs, village in Catalonia
