= MCW Metrorider =

Step-entrance integral midibus

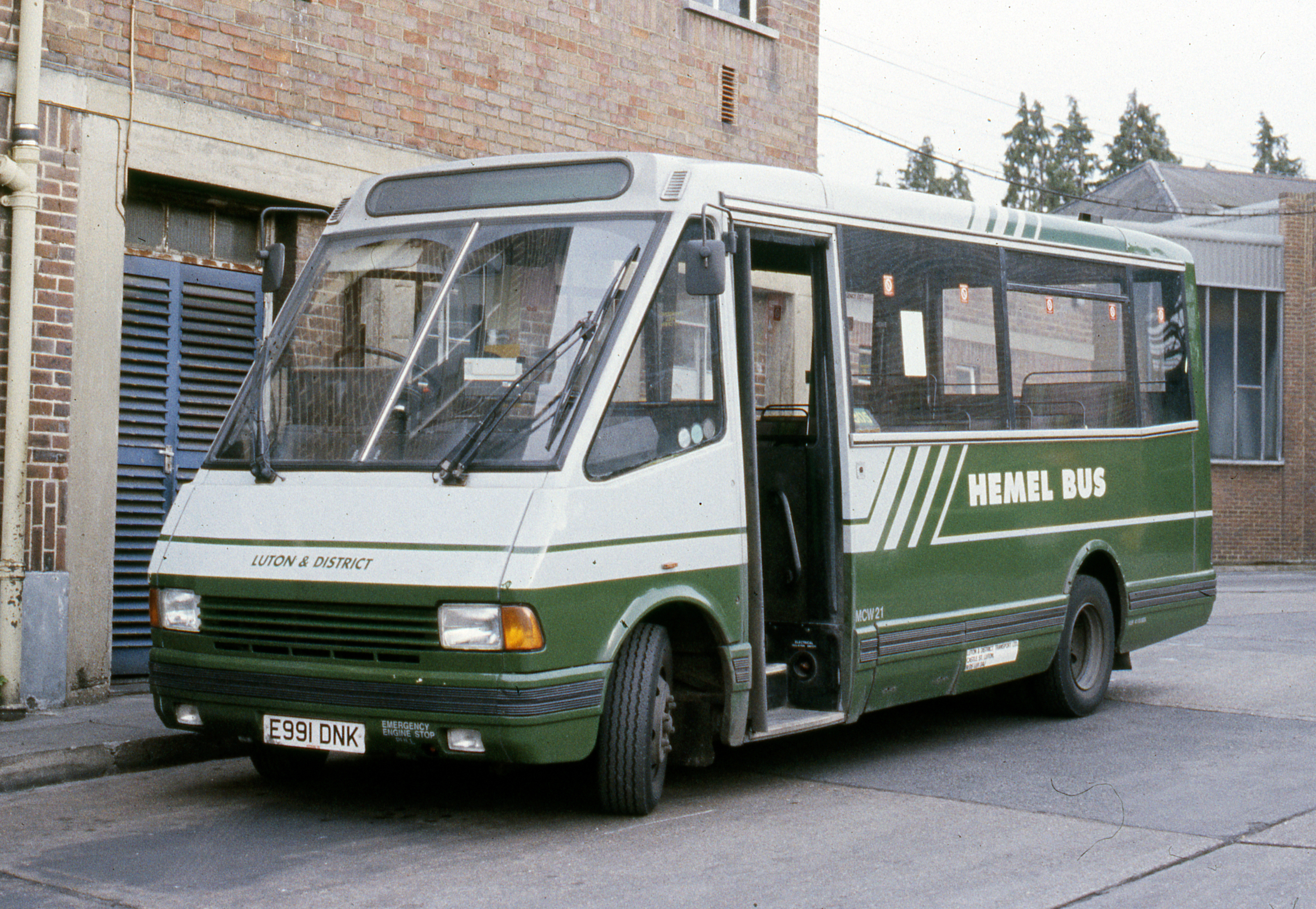
- London Country North West MCW Metrorider in Hemel Hempstead in 1992

Overview
- Manufacturer: Metro Cammell Weymann
- Production: 1986-1989

Body and chassis
- Class: Midibus
- Doors: 1
- Floor type: Step entrance
- Chassis: Integral

Powertrain
- Engine: Cummins B Series engine Perkins
- Capacity: 25-33 seated
- Transmission: ZF (manual); Allison (automatic)

Dimensions
- Length: 7.0–8.4 metres (23.0–27.6 ft)
- Width: 2.2–2.376 metres (7 ft 2.6 in – 7 ft 9.5 in)

Chronology
- Successor: Optare MetroRider

The MCW Metrorider was an integral midibus designed and built by Metro Cammell Weymann (MCW) between 1986 and 1989.

== Design ==
Launched at the 1986 British International Motor Show in Birmingham, the MCW Metrorider was the second purpose-built midibus design for the United Kingdom bus market, following the launch of the Volkswagen LT55-based Optare CityPacer a year prior. MCW used substantial components, the Perkins Phaser/ZF manual S5 driveline soon being outsold by the optional 115 bhp six-cylinder 5.9 litre Cummins B series engine driving through an Allison fully automatic gearbox. Some Metroriders also featured the optional turbocharged Cummins engine, increasing their turn of speed. Disc brakes were fitted on the long-wheelbase Metrorider, as opposed to drum brakes on the short vehicles.

The styling was a major advance on the earlier van-based conversions, having a raked front with large windscreen and side windows to give a light interior, as well as shallower steps, a wider entrance and gangway, and improved headroom. Seating configurations ranged from 25 seats in the standard Metrorider to 33 seats in the widened long-wheelbase version of the Metrorider, which measured 8.4 metres (28 ft) in length and 2.375 metres (7 ft 9.5 in) in width. Like many MCW products, many components were from other manufacturers' stocks, with the dashboard and steering wheel coming from a Ford Cargo lorry and the original rear lights coming from the Mk4 Ford Escort Cabriolet.

When MCW's parent group announced the closure of the company in 1989, MCW's current designs were offered for sale and the rights to the Metrorider, alongside the MCW Metrobus, were bought by Optare. The Metrorider was relaunched as the Optare MetroRider, and subsequently continued in production until 2000.

== Operators ==
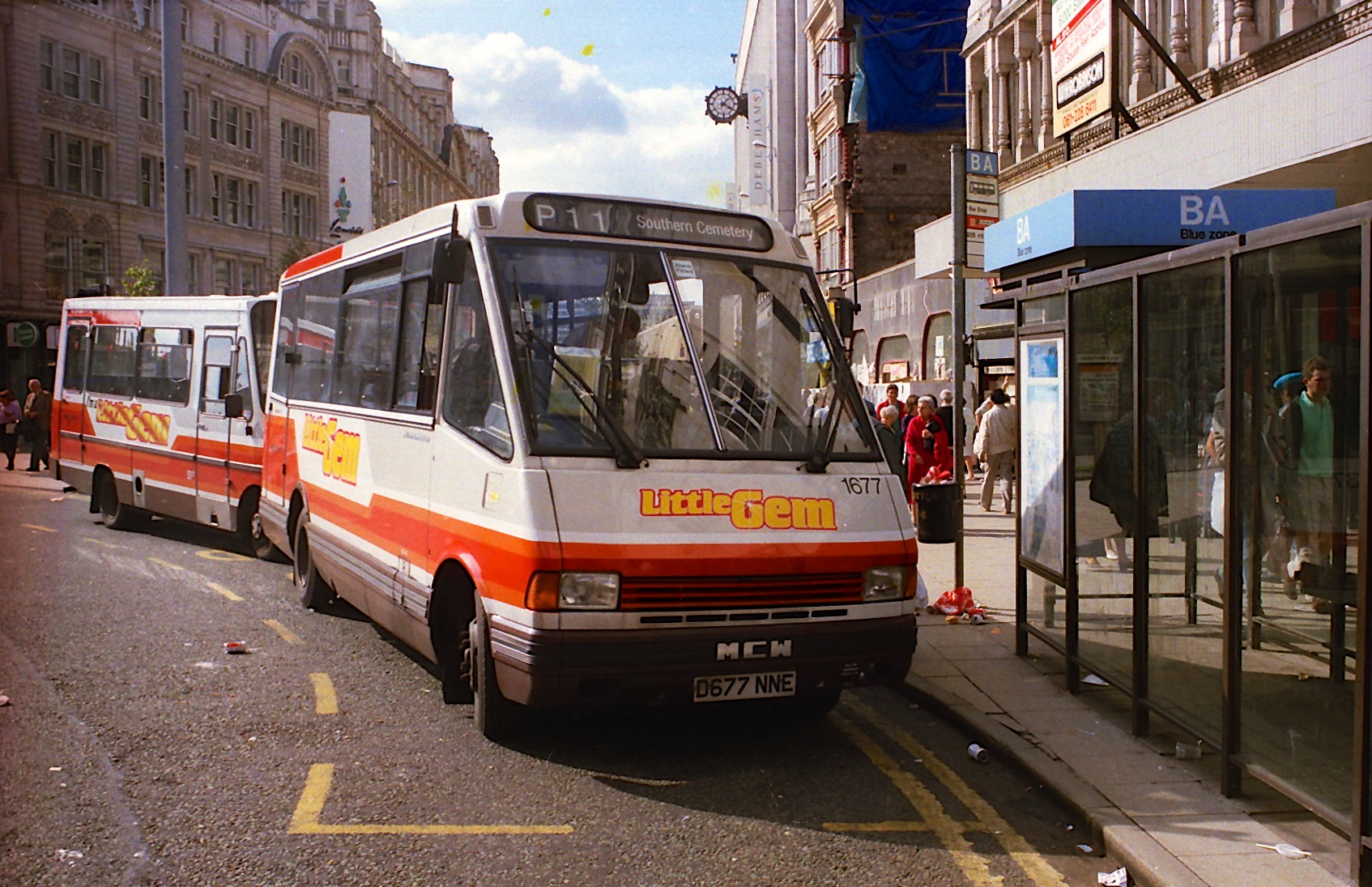
GM Buses 'Little Gem' MCW Metrorider in Piccadilly Gardens, Manchester in August 1987

The MCW Metrorider would ultimately suit the United Kingdom's newly deregulated bus industry, receiving £27 million worth of orders before production commenced. The first major order for Metroriders following the launch was from GM Buses, who would take delivery of eighty Metroriders for use on its competitive 'Little Gem' midibus operations. Many subsequent orders followed from former municipal and National Bus Company operators as well as newly established independent bus operators, with Metroriders being delivered to companies operating in both urban and rural environments such as London Regional Transport's London Buses operations, South Wales Transport, Wilts & Dorset, and East Midland Motor Services. The final MCW Metrorider to be built was constructed by Optare at their Leeds factory in November 1989 for delivery to Kentish Bus, operating it on a London Regional Transport contract service which ran through the Rotherhithe Tunnel.

A substantial export agreement was also achieved by MCW with the Metrorider, with Dutch coachbuilder Bova signing with MCW in 1987 to sell long-wheelbase right-hand drive Metroriders in Continental Europe. Smaller numbers of right-hand drive Metroriders would also be exported to Ireland for use with Dublin Bus, as well as to Hong Kong in 1988, where two air-conditioned Metroriders were delivered to China Motor Bus, with another also delivered to Kowloon Motor Bus.

== See also ==
- Optare MetroRider, the MCW Metrorider's successor
- List of buses
