= Optare CityPacer =

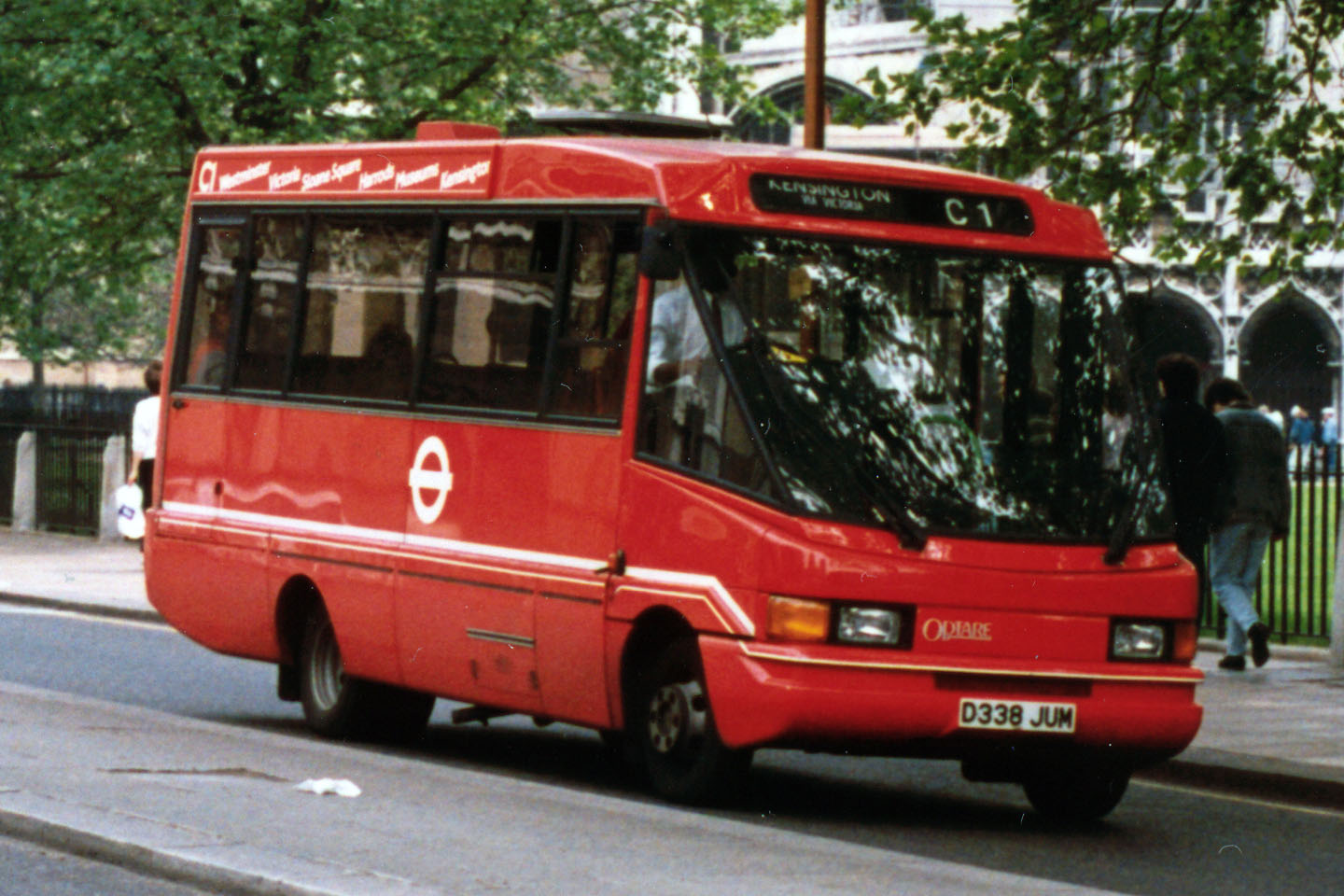
- A London Regional Transport Optare CityPacer in 1986

Overview
- Manufacturer: Optare
- Production: 1985 - 1992
- Assembly: Cross Gates

Body and chassis
- Doors: 1
- Floor type: Step entrance
- Chassis: Volkswagen LT55

Chronology
- Successor: Optare MetroRider

The Optare CityPacer was a minibus body manufactured by Optare from 1985 to 1992.

Launched in November 1985, it was fitted to the Volkswagen LT55 chassis. A total of 294 were manufactured, with London Regional Transport purchasing 52.

Its prominent feature was its large one-piece front windscreen, with large triangular quarterlights giving the impression that it wrapped around the sides of the body. Primarily built for the British market, two were built in left hand drive configuration for an operator in the Netherlands.

The CityPacer was supplemented but not replaced by the StarRider, based on the Mercedes-Benz 811D chassis. Both were replaced by the integral Optare MetroRider, which had been a competing design from Metro Cammell Weymann before Optare bought the rights to the design.
