= Optare Alero =

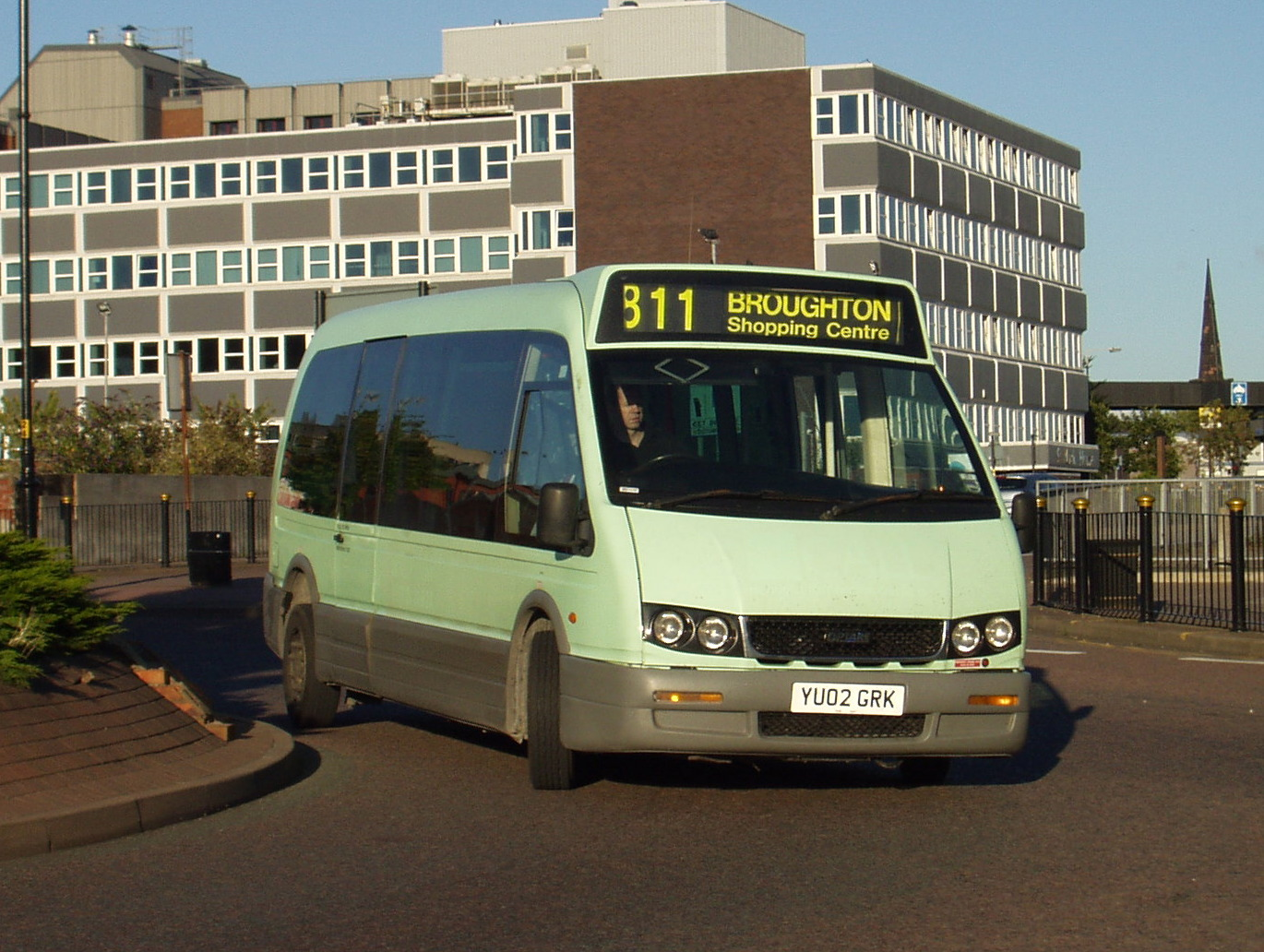
- Cumfy Bus Optare Alero in Birkenhead in 2007

Overview
- Manufacturer: Optare
- Production: 2001-2008

Body and chassis
- Doors: 1 (double) front door, 1 emergency rear door
- Floor type: Low floor
- Chassis: Stainless Steel Chassis / cage

Powertrain
- Engine: Iveco 2.8TD
- Capacity: 16 seated
- Transmission: 6M / 3A

Dimensions
- Length: 7.2 metres
- Width: 2.0 metres
- Height: 2.5 metres
- Curb weight: 5600Kg MVW

The Optare Alero is a low-floor GRP monocoque minibus that was built by Optare between 2001 and 2008. It was built as an alternative to van-derived buses such as the Mercedes-Benz Sprinter.

Around 300 were built in the first five years of production. The primary markets for the Alero have been community transport groups and rural demand responsive bus routes.

== Features ==
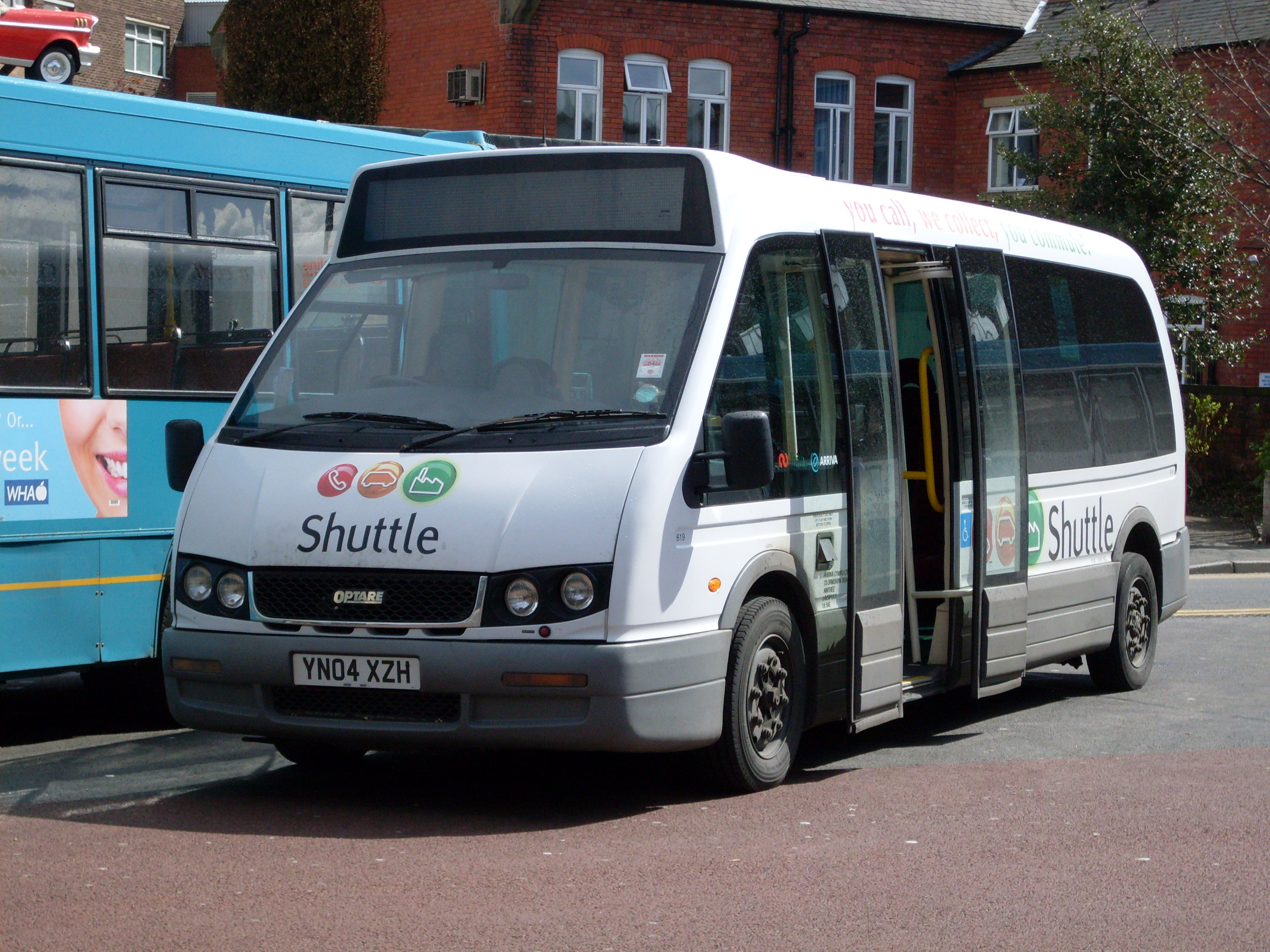
Arriva North West and Wales Optare Alero in Wrexham in April 2008

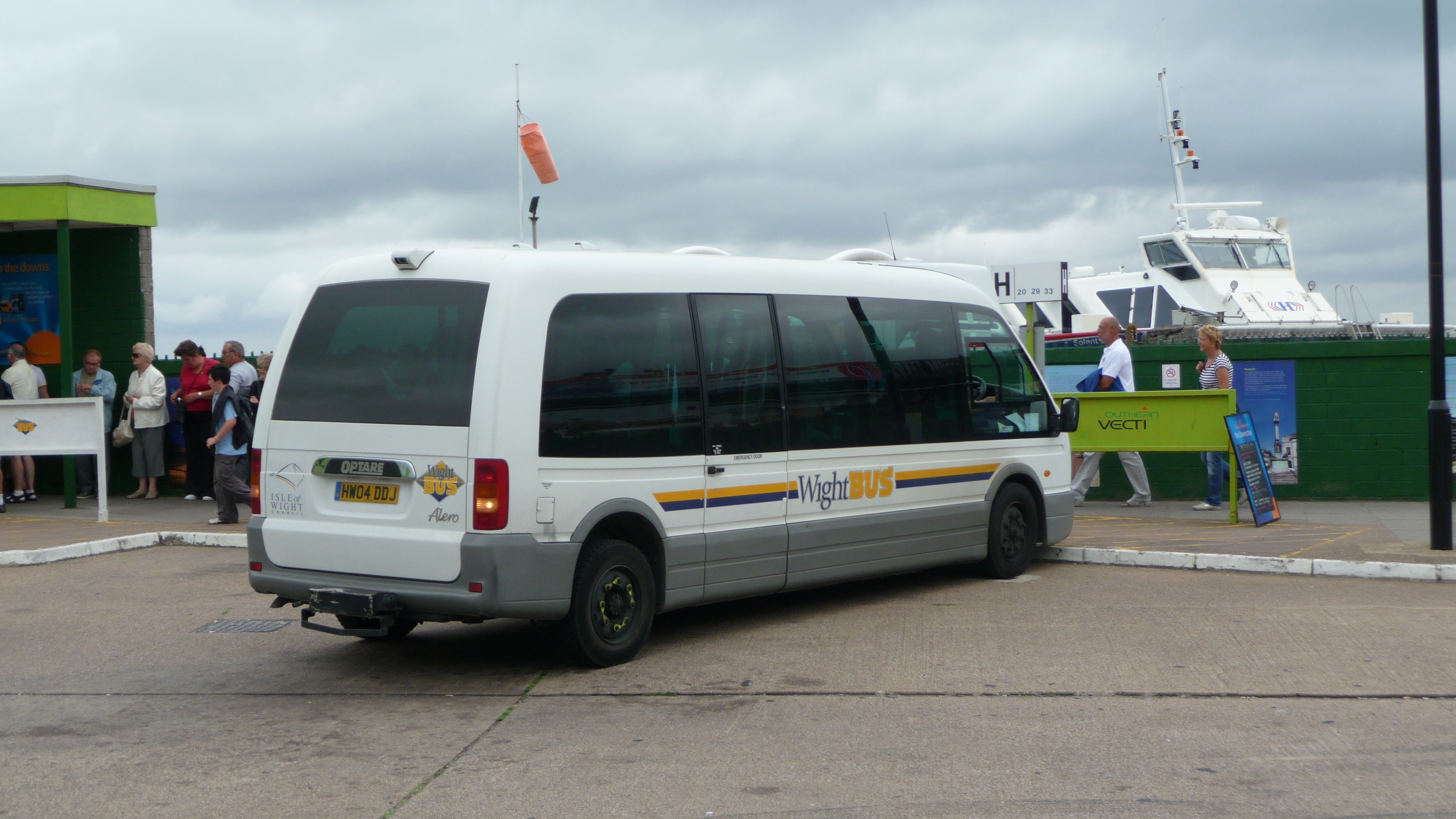
Wightbus Optare Alero rear in Ryde in August 2010

The Alero has a 2.8 litre Iveco turbo diesel engine and a choice of 6 speed manual or automatic ZF transmission. It typically seats between twelve and sixteen passengers, capacity being partly dependent upon whether space is provided for a wheelchair. The destination display box is optional.

== Alero Plus ==
The Alero was relaunched in 2006 as the Alero Plus. The previous torquey and economical 2.8 litre turbo diesel Iveco (from the Daily II range) engine was replaced by the higher-revving 3 litre later Iveco (Daily III) engine with chain-driven cam. The Alero plus had its main battery in the boot, overcoming the nightmare under-bonnet battery access in the original Alero. Various changes and component upgrades have been made in an attempt to overcome reliability and durability issues suffered by the original design. In 2008, the Alero was discontinued after the production run of around 300 units.
