= Switch Mobility =

British bus manufacturer

Switch Mobility Automotive Ltd.
- Formerly: Optare (1985–2020)
- Type: Public
- Traded as: Optare Group Limited
- ISIN: INE208A01029
- Industry: Automotive
- Founded: February 1985; 41 years ago (as Optare)
- Headquarters: Chennai, India Sherburn-in-Elmet, England
- Area served: Worldwide
- Key people: Dheeraj Hinduja (chairman)
- Products: Electric buses; Commercial vehicles
- Revenue: ▲$4.88 million (31 March 2020)
- Number of employees: 325
- Parent: Ashok Leyland
- Website: switchmobilityev.com

Switch Mobility Automotive Ltd. (Optare until 2020) is an Indian commercial vehicle manufacturer based in Chennai, India and it is a subsidiary of Ashok Leyland. The company is responsible for the EV operations of the group with Ashok Leyland focusing on its core business of diesel-powered vehicles as well as work on alternative fuels like compressed natural gas (CNG), liquefied natural gas (LNG) and hydrogen.

After being rebranded from Optare to Switch Mobility in November 2020, it announced plans in 2021 to set up a plant in India for its electric vehicle business. Later, it acquired the EV division from parent company Ashok Leyland via a slump sale of 2.4 billion rupees (~£23 million).

Switch Mobility has two subsidiary companies. The first subsidiary is Switch Mobility Automotive Ltd, which brings together Ashok Leyland's Indian based EV operations with the expertise of the UK-based bus manufacturing division. The second subsidiary is named OHM Global Mobility Private Ltd which provides Mobility as a Service (eMaaS) solutions in India.

Former Optare logo

== History ==
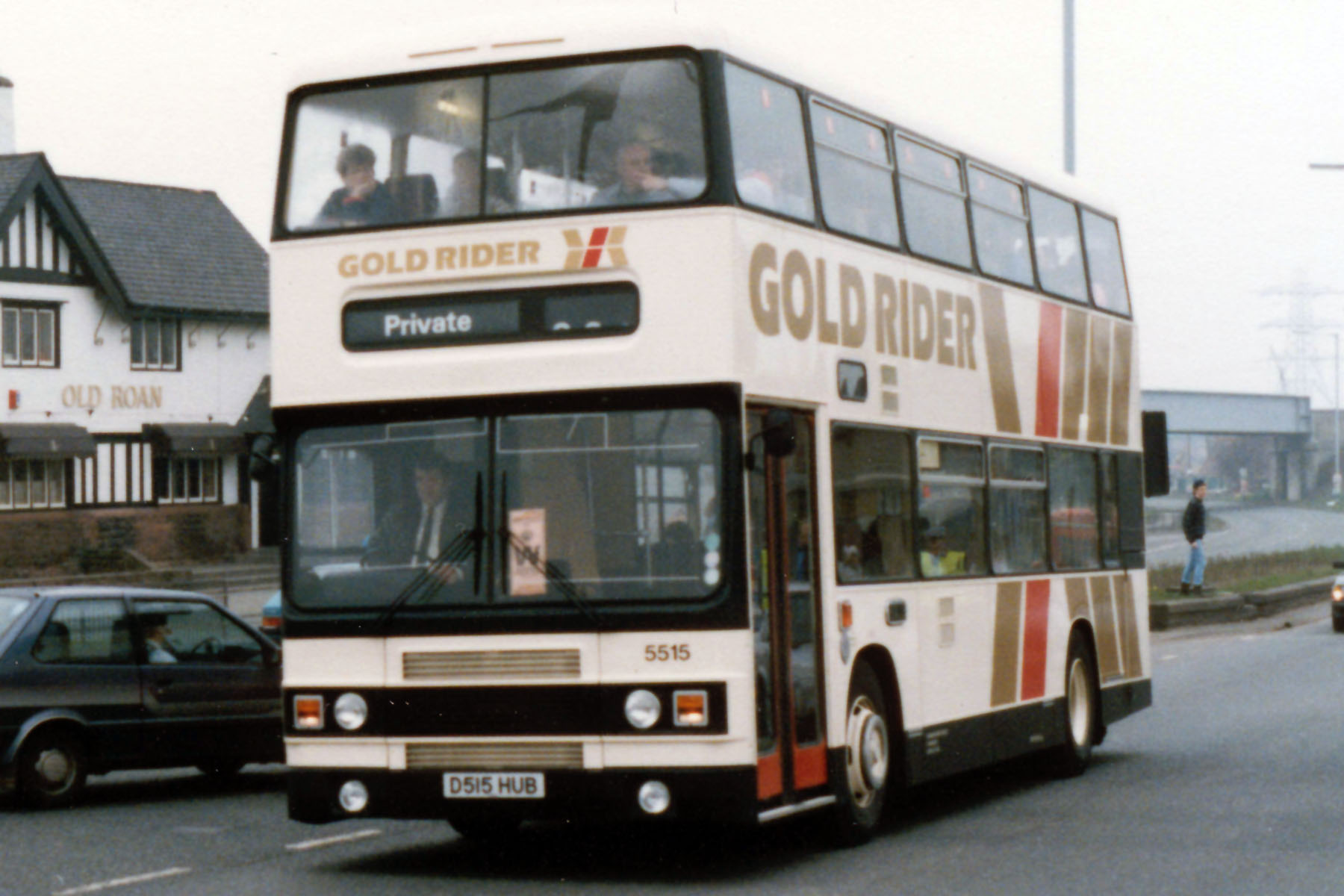
Yorkshire Rider Optare-bodied Leyland Olympian

=== Formation of Optare ===
In September 1984, Leyland Bus closed its Charles H Roe vehicle bodywork building business in Leeds. In response, Russell Richardson, a former plant director at Roe, backed by the West Yorkshire Enterprise Board and many redundant former employees, formed Optare in February 1985.

The company was created at a very difficult time for the bus and coach industry, with the challenges of privatisation and deregulation meaning very few orders for new vehicles. The first orders came from the still publicly owned West Yorkshire Passenger Transport Executive (WYPTE) and South Yorkshire Passenger Transport Executive (SYPTE). The publicly owned but arms-length company Yorkshire Rider, as successor to the WYPTE bus fleet, also took early vehicles.

When the Roe business closed down, WYPTE had an unfulfilled order for five Leyland Olympian coach-seated double-decker buses in place for its Metro coach operation. These five part finished buses went from Roe to Eastern Coach Works as shells for completion, but subsequently ten more were completed as Optare buses but to the Roe design, the first of which was completed in September 1985, the 17th Optare bus body. Five went to WYPTE, and five to its successor Yorkshire Rider, and a further five standard seated Olympians were also delivered to WYPTE, two as convertible open top buses.

The first Optare designed bodies were fourteen Dennis Dominos for the SYPTE built starting in February 1986. Optare also bodied fifteen Leyland Cubs for the WYPTE. A preserved Cub later visited the Optare plant in 2005.

Starting in August 1986, Optare built fifteen minibuses converted from the Freight Rover Sherpa 350 vans for the WYPTE.

=== Early minibuses ===
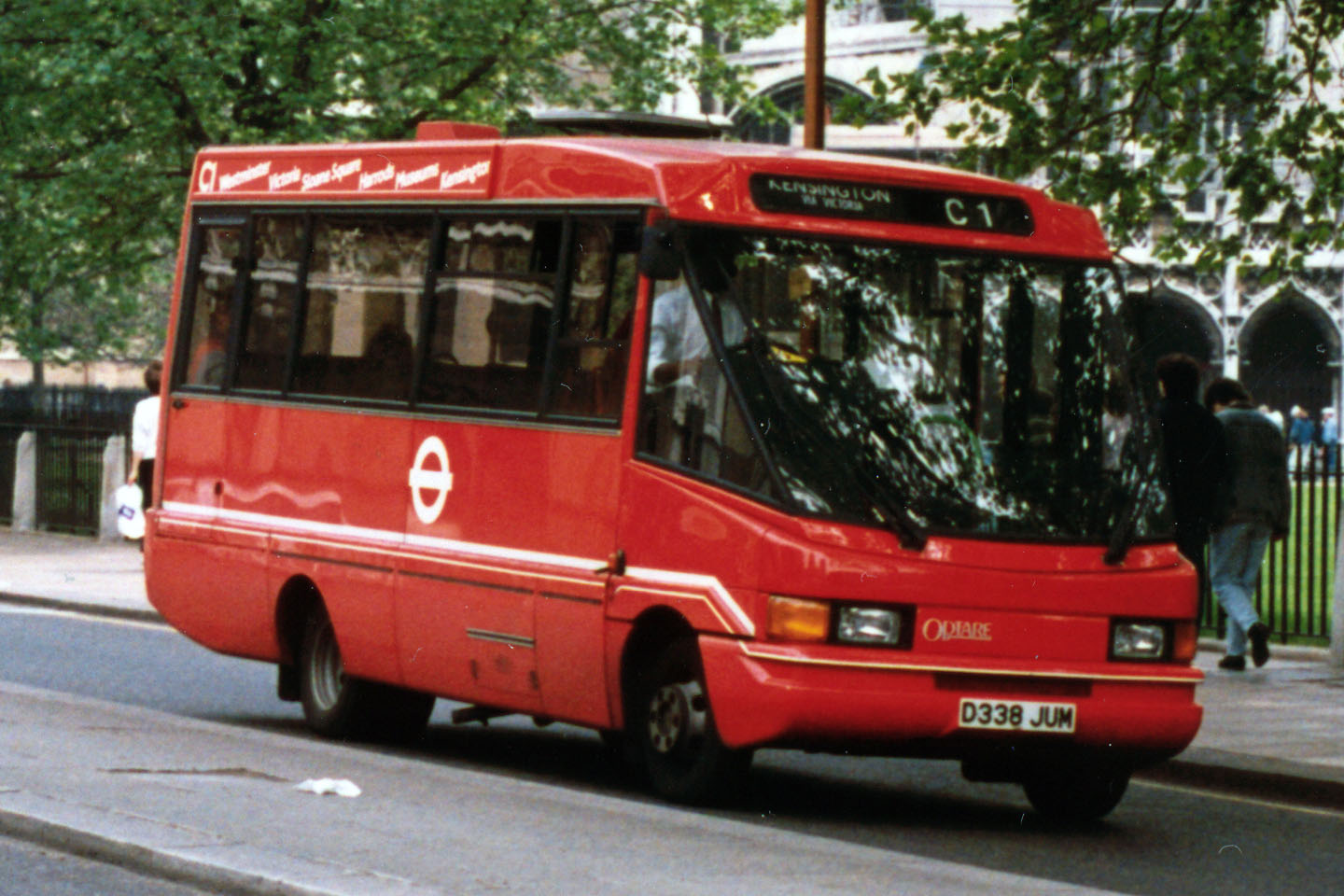
1986 London Regional Transport Optare CityPacer

In 1986, Optare introduced the CityPacer minibus. This was based on a heavier version of the Volkswagen LT50 van chassis, to which Optare made modifications prior to bodying. The engine was a six-cylinder 2.4-litre and the body seated 25, with space for a further five standing passengers, a size that met the minibus vogue of the late 1980s. While its competitors looked like the modified vans they were, the CityPacer had attractive styling notable for its large one-piece raked windscreen. London Regional Transport bought 52, and other major operators bought small batches. More than 290 CityPacers were produced in total between 1986 and 1992.

In 1987, the StarRider, based on the Mercedes-Benz 811D chassis, was introduced. This was a heavier chassis with a proven reliability record and had seating for 33 passengers. London Regional Transport took 123 StarRiders and a total of just under 320 were built between 1987 and 1994.

In an attempt to break into the export market, the ColumboRider was subsequently developed, named after the city of Colombo in Sri Lanka, where the first examples were sold. The ColumboRider was a semi-integral version of the StarRider, based on a chassis made by a consortium including Optare, Japanese technology company Itochu and local Sri Lankan manufacturer Ceylinco. The ColumboRider was replaced by an export version of the MetroRider.

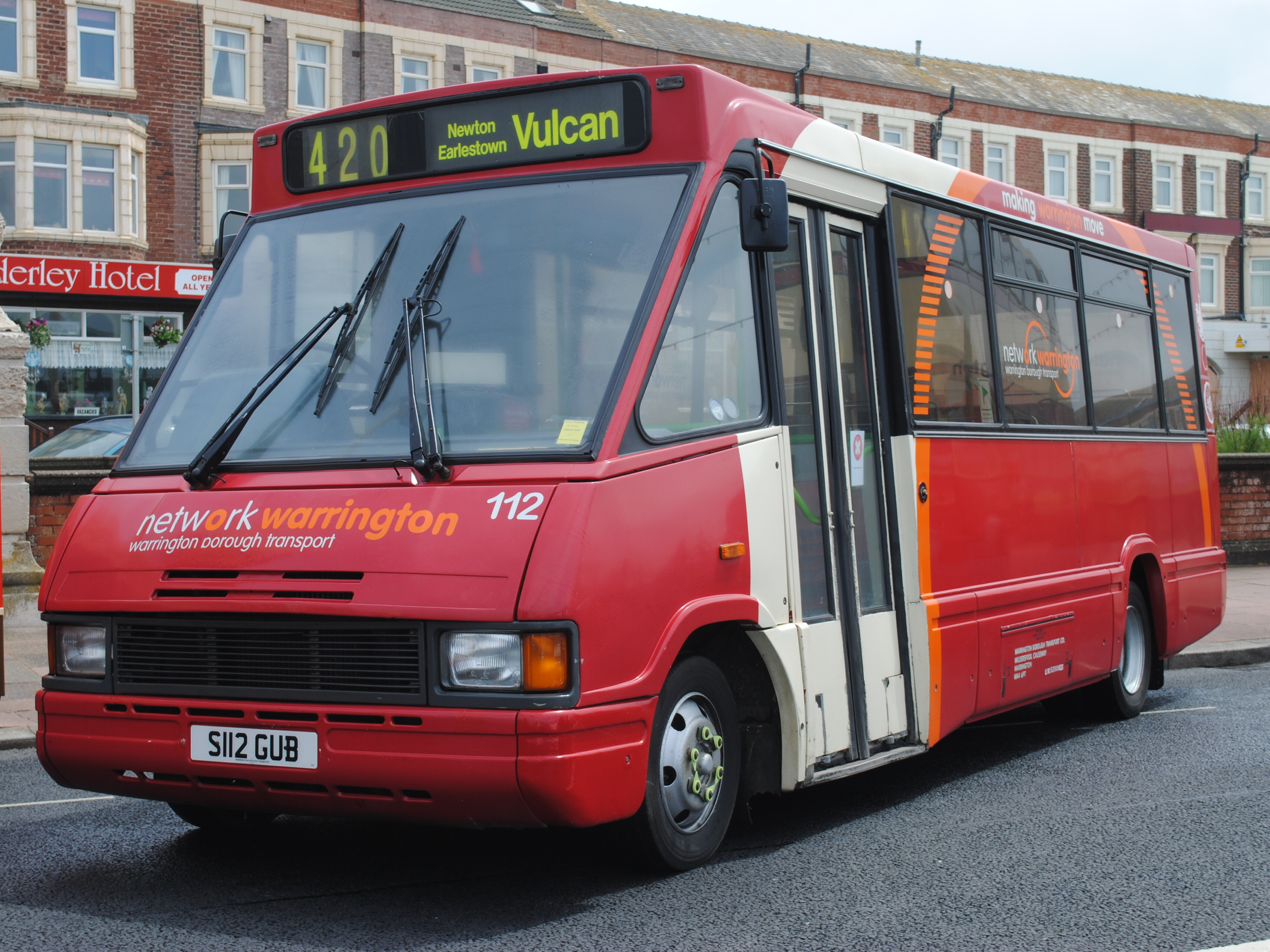
Warrington Borough Transport Optare MetroRider in Blackpool in June 2013

In 1990, Optare bodied thirteen Renault S50 minibuses with a welfare bodywork which has since come to be known as the 9000-series, due to the allocated body numbers. As standard, the 9000-series community transport minibus had a front door, nine passenger seats and a rear tail lift for wheelchair access. All thirteen examples built were delivered to Leeds City Council between March and May 1990, and no further orders were ever placed.

=== Expansion ===
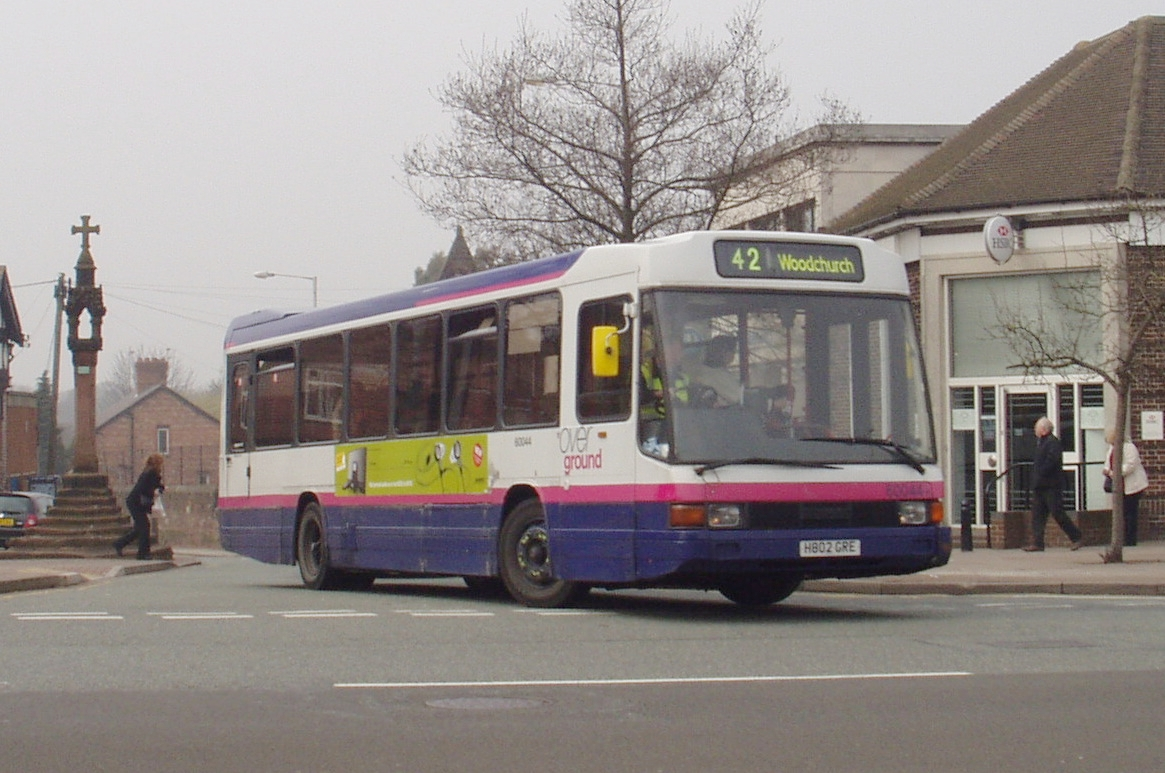
First Chester & The Wirral Optare Delta on the Wirral Peninsula in March 2007

In 1988 the first full size Optare product appeared, the Delta. This was a single-deck bus based on the DAF SB220 chassis. The Delta bodywork featured contemporary styling and was aluminium with a bolted frame licensed from Alusuisse. The Delta successfully found a niche in the full-size single deck bus market, which was very limited at that time. Approaching 370 Deltas were built before production ended in 1998.

Dennis had effectively created a new market segment, known as a midibus, with the introduction of the Dennis Dart. Optare soon introduced a competitor, the Vecta, albeit slightly bigger and wider than the Dart at that time, seating 40 in a full-width 2.5 m body. The chassis was the MAN 11.190 and featured a ZF gearbox and full air suspension. The bodywork was a scaled down version of the Delta.

The CityPacer and StarRider were phased out in the years after Optare purchased the design for the MCW Metrorider in July 1989, rebranding it as the Optare MetroRider. This was a larger design than the CityPacer, and more robust when compared to the StarRider. It was Optare's first venture into fully integral vehicle manufacturing, and became the mainstay of the Optare midi/minibus offering until the low floor Solo was introduced in 1997.

=== DAF/United Bus ===
In 1990, Optare joined a group called the United Bus, which included DAF Bus.

Having already used a DAF SB220 chassis on the Delta, now as part of United Bus, Optare collaborated with DAF to design the Optare Spectra. It was based on the modified design of the MCW Metrobus purchased by Optare, and combined parts from it and the SB220 to form a new double deck chassis, designated DB250, with Optare bodywork called Spectra. Due to the United bus relationship and joint design, the Spectra was built exclusively on the DB250 chassis. As well as having a striking front end, the Spectra was also recognisable for having no rear window. Introduced in 1990 it was described as a "partly low-floor double-decker". Despite the association with DAF, in 1991 Optare also launched a conventional height midibus on the MAN 11.180 chassis, the Vecta.

After the collapse of United Bus in 1993, Optare was again returned to independent status with another management buyout. The reaction to the collapse of United Bus was the release in the next two years of two Delta derived single deck buses on different non-DAF chassis, the Sigma and Prisma, the latter being on the Mercedes-Benz O405 chassis which had a Mercedes-Benz style front end rather than the Optare family face.

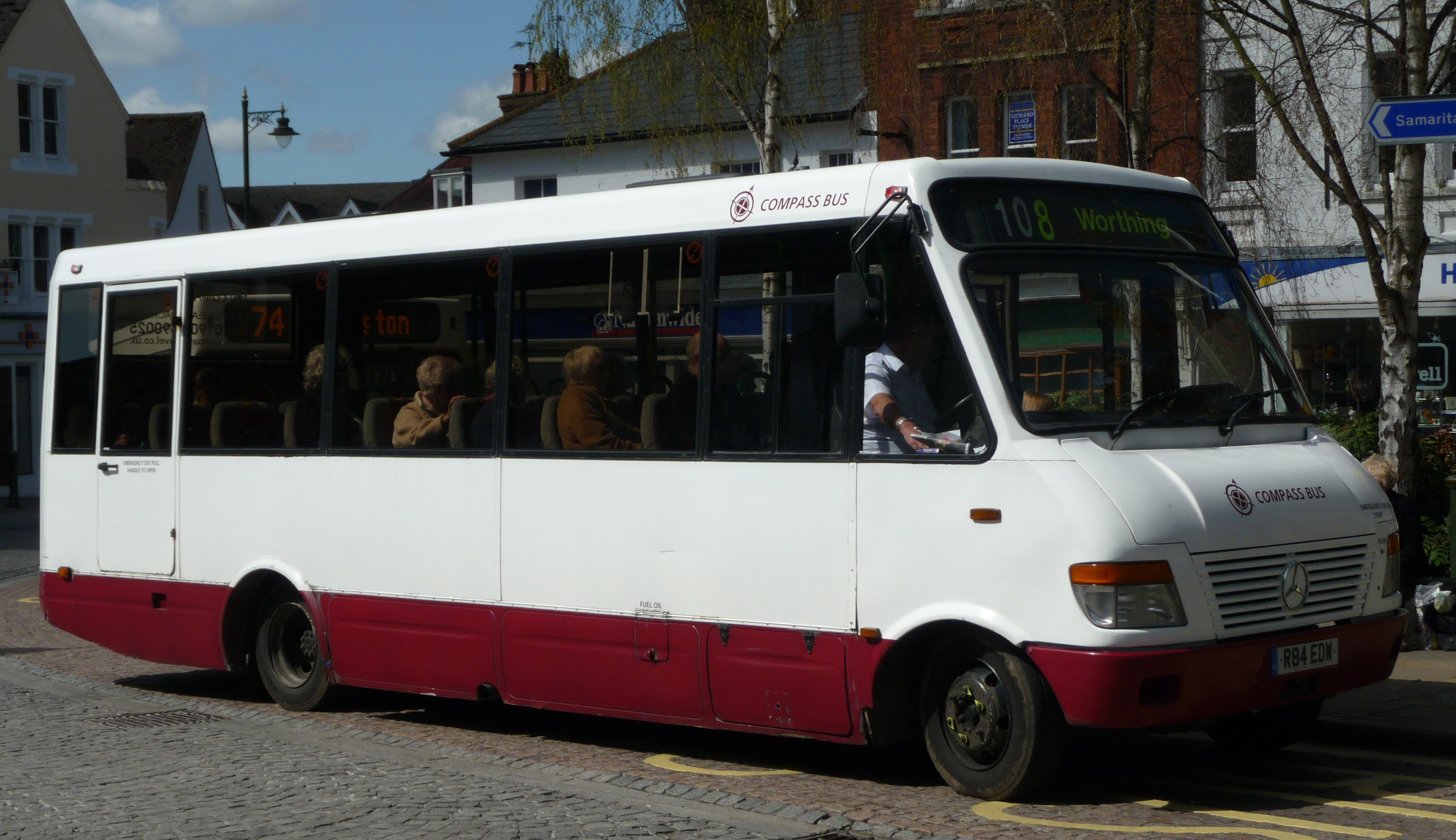
Autobus Classique bodied Mercedes-Benz Vario in Horsham in April 2009

Optare acquired Autobus Classique in 1996, shortly after the launch of their Nouvelle luxury minicoach. Optare significantly redesigned and rebadged it in 1997 as the Nouvelle 2, and it served similar markets to the StarRider/MetroRider coach versions. Also in 1997 a relationship with a Spanish mini and midi coach manufacturer named Ferqui SL began, with the importation of the Solera luxury midicoach into the UK.

While part of United Bus, Optare also for a time became the exclusive UK dealer for the distinctive full size Bova Futura coach.

=== Low floor era ===
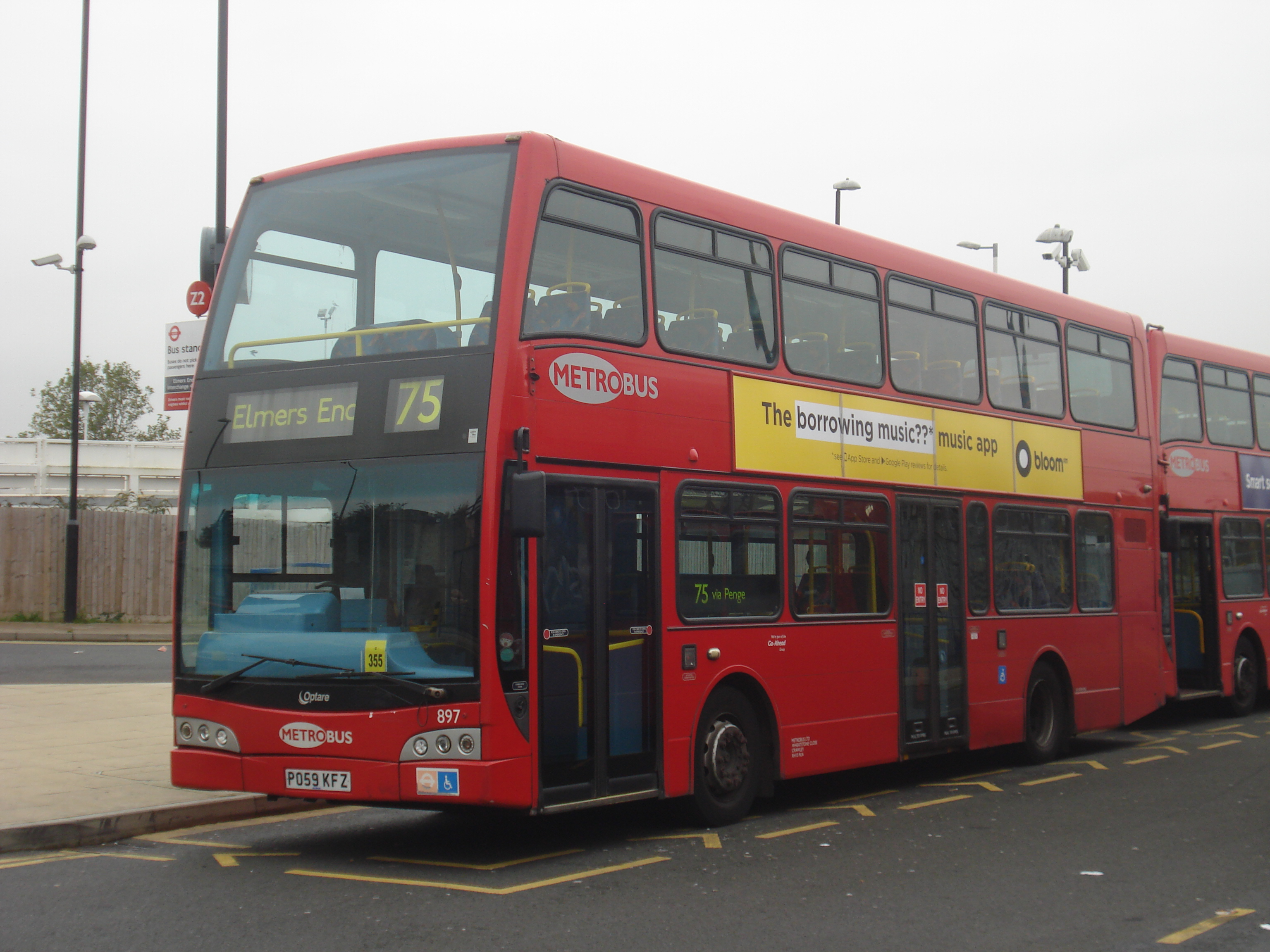
Metrobus Optare Olympus bodied Scania N230UD in Elmers End in November 2013

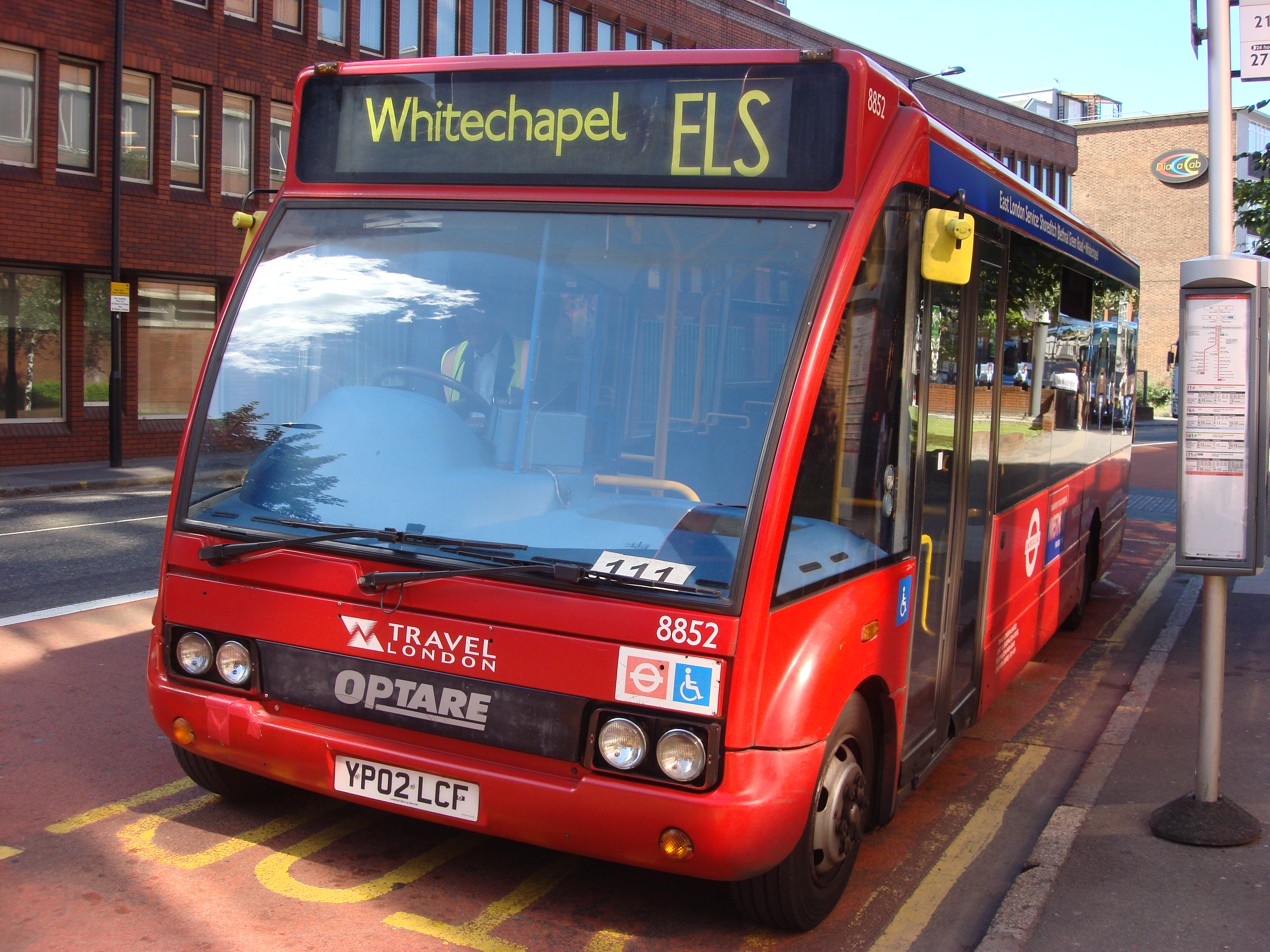
Travel London Optare Solo M850 in London in July 2008

Optare began introduction of low-floor buses in the UK in 1995 with the launch of the Optare Excel full size single decker. Although low floor single decker buses had begun to appear as early as 1993. Initially, the Excel used Cummins engines and Allison Transmissions with later examples (Excel 2) having Mercedes-Benz engines available as an option. The introduction of the Excel marked the start of a sustained period of selling integral bus products rather than body on chassis combinations, which continued until the Darwen merger briefly brought East Lancs models to the range.

With modifications of the DB250 chassis to become the DB250LF, in 1997, the Spectra became the first fully low-floor double decker bus on offer in the UK.

Also in 1997 the Solo was launched and became a success for Optare. With a unique design of a front axle forward of the door, it allowed a low-floor layout in a very short bus, and also came equipped with kneeling suspension for even greater access. Its styling and innovation led to a Millennium Products award and the Queen's Award for Innovation.

=== North American Bus Industries ===
In 2000, Optare was bought by Hungarian owned North American Bus Industries (NABI). This gave Optare products exposure in the North American market, with an export version of the Solo finding success at several US airports and with Miami-Dade Transit in Florida.

The NABI era saw the introduction of the Alero low-floor minicoach in 2001, filling a gap in the market for a low floor vehicle for use on low intensity services such as demand responsive transport, already covered at the higher capacity by the Solo. In 2004 the new derivatives of Solo were introduced offering a longer variant and also a narrower 'SlimLine' model to further capture the market. Also introduced in 2004 was the first new bus model since the Solo, the Tempo, a full size single decker with another striking design, even when considered in the environment of increasingly stylish competitor products.

On 1 August 2005, NABI found itself in financial difficulties, and speculation about the future of Optare was ended with the announcement that Optare had, once again, been acquired by its management. This change did not affect the further roll out of the new range, leading to the Versa and a radically restyled Solo (the Solo SR), both with a distinctive raised part of the roofline towards the front of the bus.

=== Darwen purchase and subsequent reverse takeover ===
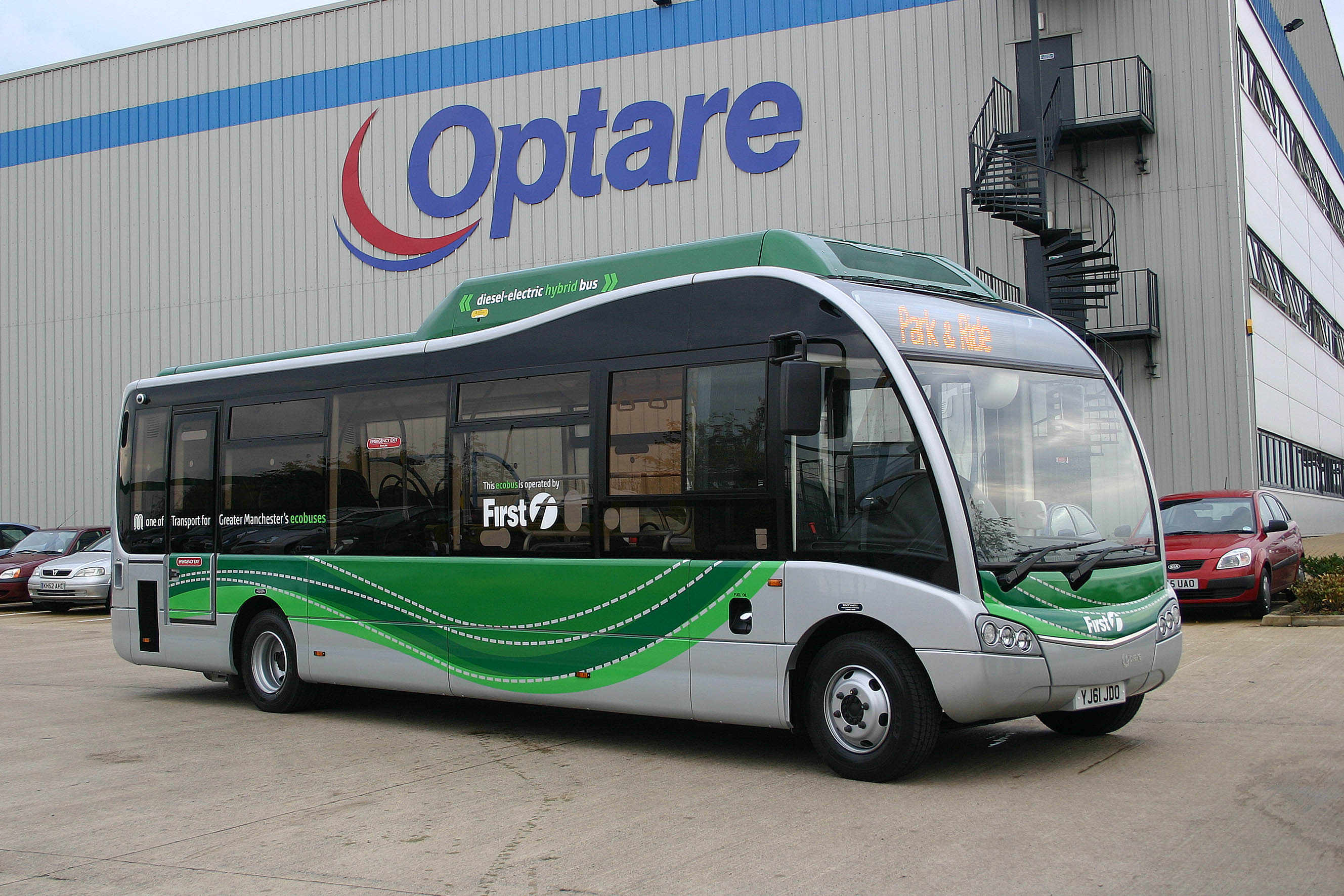
First Manchester Optare Solo SR with hybrid drive in July 2012

On 12 March 2008, Optare was purchased by Jamesstan Investments, an investment company controlled by the Darwen Group's parent company chairman Ron Stanley. Optare initially remained an independent company but by 17 July 2008, a reverse takeover by Darwen Group had been completed. Darwen was the much smaller company, but its Alternative Investment Market listing saw the enlarged Optare gain a stock exchange listing itself as Optare plc. The combined business employed 830 people with a £90 million turnover. With the respective histories of the two entities, Optare plc could be considered the successor company to the historical British bus manufacturers Charles H Roe (through Optare), founded in Leeds in 1923, and East Lancashire Coachbuilders, (through Darwen), founded in 1934 in Blackburn.

==== Optare plc ====
The Optare website was relaunched with a new logo, and with the ex East Lancs Olympus and Esteem models marketed as Optare products. At the time of merger, Optare manufactured buses from three sites, the primary sites being in Leeds (the former Leyland Bus site) and Blackburn (the former East Lancs site), with a further facility in Rotherham.

The merger brought together the single deck and midibus portfolio of Optare and the primarily double deck order book of Darwen.

After the merger, Optare began rationalisation of its bus manufacturing business. In 2009 the production of Esteem single-deck bodywork was ceased, and the manufacturing site at Rotherham was closed.

=== Ashok Leyland acquisition and name rebrand ===
In summer 2010, Ashok Leyland (the former Indian subsidiary of British Leyland) bought a 26% stake in Optare. Subsequently, in December 2011 Ashok Leyland increased its stake to 75%.

In 2011, a new fully enclosed 13,000-square-metre (140,000 sq ft) factory opened in Sherburn-in-Elmet, replacing the Leeds plant. In 2012, the former East Lancs site also closed putting all manufacturing processes under one roof. In June 2015, Optare was delisted from the Alternative Investment Market. In October 2017, Ashok Leyland increased its shareholding to 98%, and in 2018 to 99%. In November 2020, Ashok Leyland announced that Optare would be rebranded Switch Mobility.

In July 2021, Switch Mobility Ltd announced plans to roll out its electric (E) buses and light commercial vehicles (LCV) from the group's UK and Indian plants. In December 2021, Switch Mobility Ltd announced the setting up of a manufacturing and technology centre in Castilla y León, Spain, at an investment of about €100 million spread over the next 10 years.

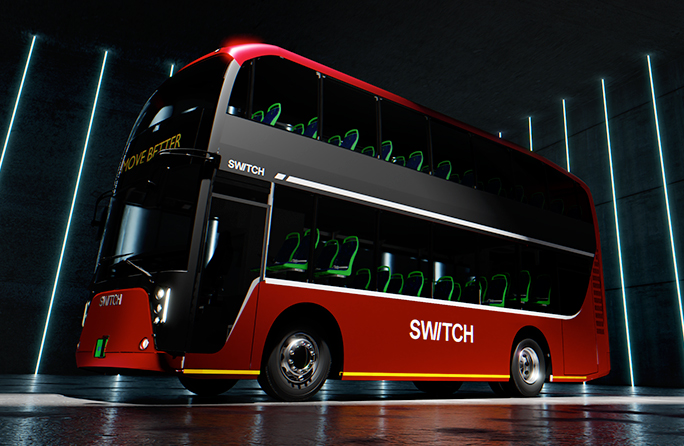
Finalised design of Switch EiV 22

Switch Mobility announced in November 2021 plans to supply 300 technologically advanced twelve-metre electric buses and the charging infrastructure to Bengaluru's Metropolitan Transport Corporation (BMTC) with the aim to reduce carbon emissions by over 14,500 tonnes every year. A month later, parent company Ashok Leyland published an EV road map with plans to launch its first e-LCV in December 2021.

In January 2022, Switch Mobility announced plans to build a new manufacturing and technology centre on a greenfield site in the Soto de Medinilla area of Valladolid, Spain. A month later, it announced that 40 new electric buses would be operational in Chandigarh. These zero-emission buses would be delivered to the Chandigarh Transport Undertaking (CTU) the same month.

In March 2025, it was announced that a consultation process had begun for the closure of the Sherburn-in-Elmet factory, with the reason given a slower than expected transition to electric vehicles by public transport operators.

== Optare product support ==
The Optare parts and service division Unitec has locations at the former Rotherham factory, as well as in Thurrock, Essex.

Since 1997, many of Optare's electrical systems have been designed and constructed in collaboration with Actia.

== Coach imports ==
In August 2008, the minicoach models Toro, Solera and Soroco were imported by Optare from the Spanish manufacturer Ferqui, and marketed as Optare products. They were luxury minicoach bodies built on Mercedes-Benz chassis, however, due to significantly reduced demand for mini and midi coaches, as part of its restructuring process, Optare took the decision to concentrate on its bus manufacturing activities and the relationship with Ferqui was formally ended in 2012.

== Products ==
=== Buses ===
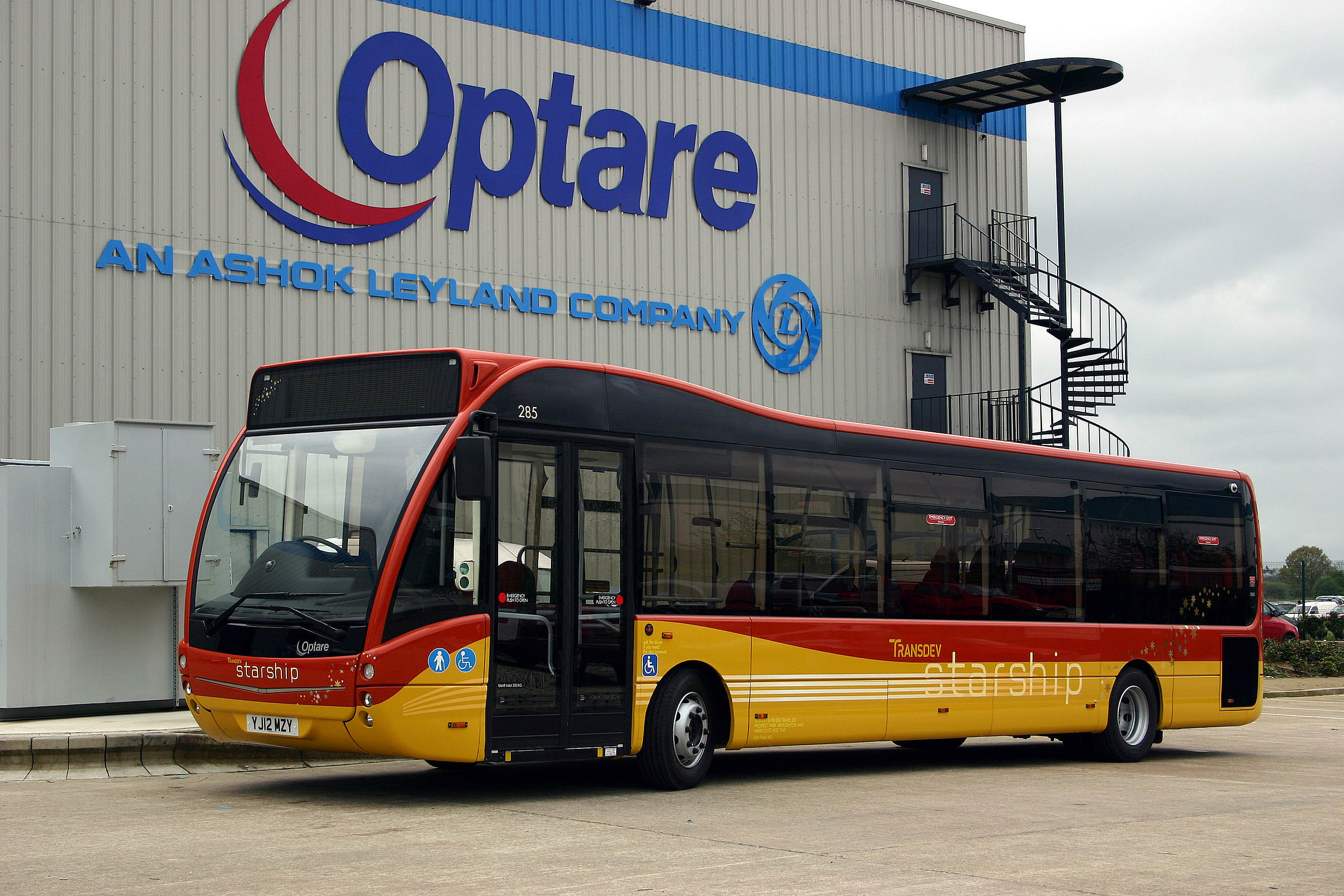
Transdev in Burnley & Pendle Optare Versa in July 2012

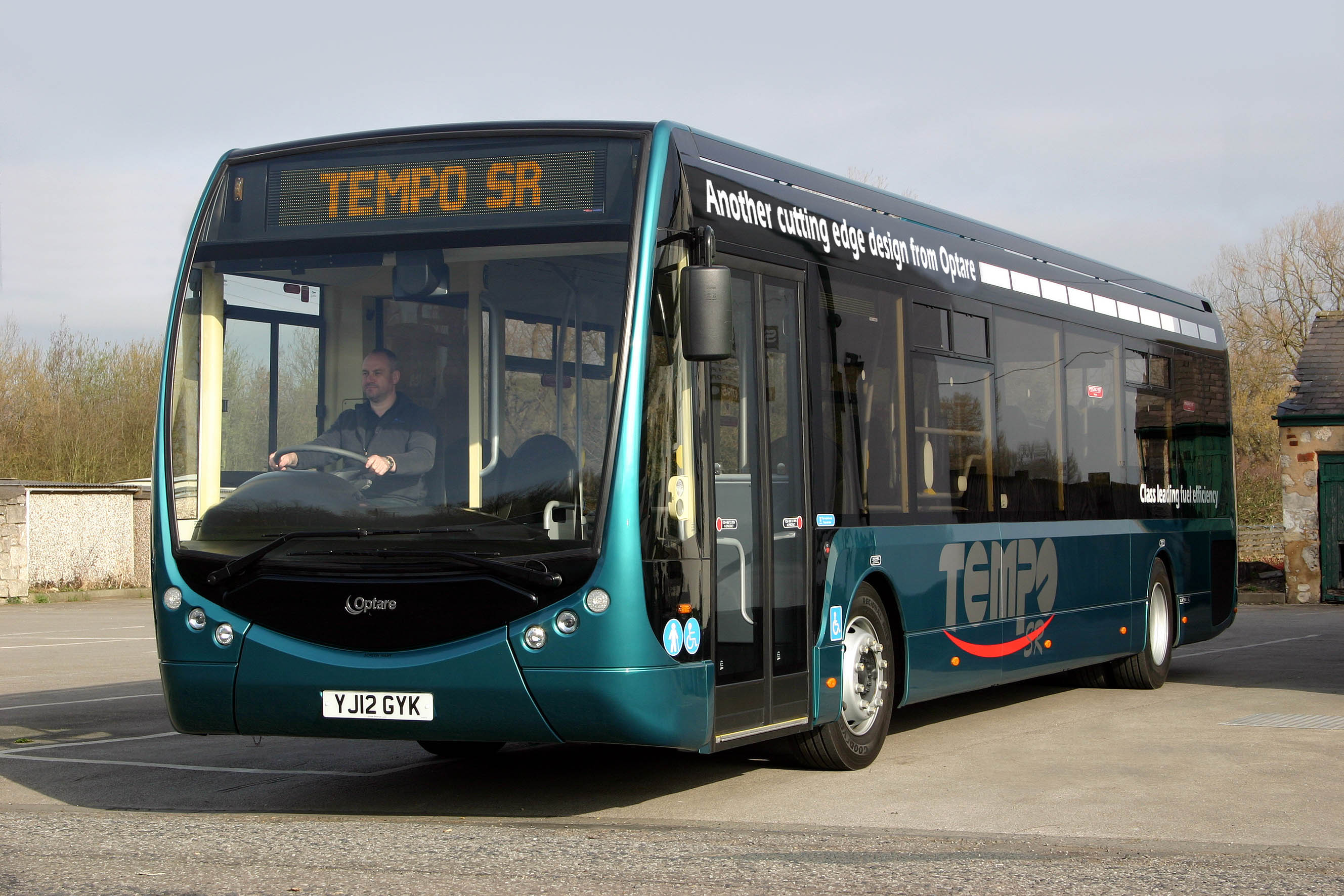
Optare Tempo SR in July 2012

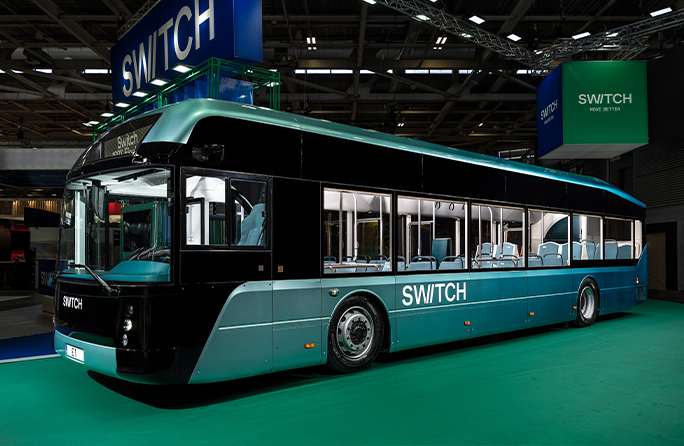
Switch E1 at the European Mobility Expo in June 2022

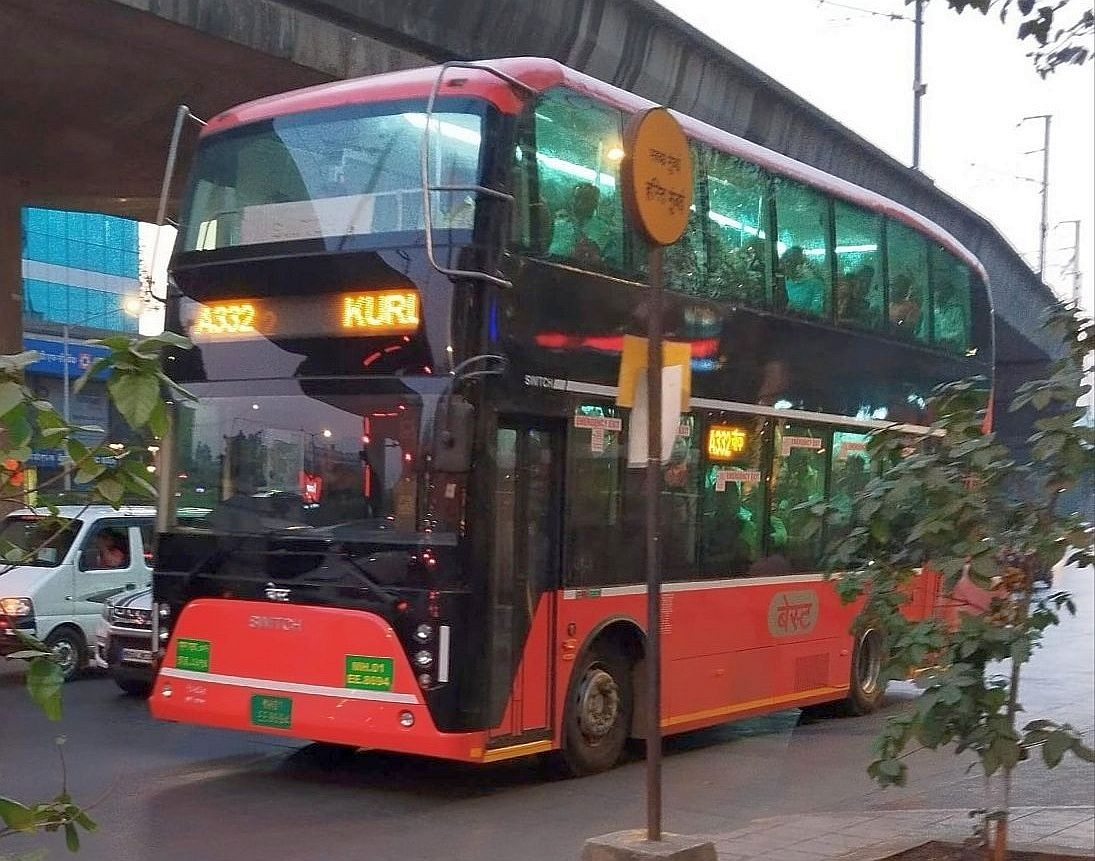
BEST Switch EiV 22 in January 2024 in Mumbai

Current

- Solo SR; Solo SR EV (2007–present)
- Metrocity; Metrocity EV (2012–present)
- Metrodecker; Metrodecker EV (2014–present)
- E1 single decker (2022–present)
- EiV 12 single decker (2022–present, for the Indian market)
- EiV 22 double decker (2022–present, for the Indian market)
- EiV 7 (2023–present, for the Indian market)

Discontinued

- CityPacer minibus (1985–1992, replaced by the MetroRider)
- StarRider minibus (1987–1994, replaced by the MetroRider)
  - ColumboRider integral variant for export to Sri Lanka (1987–1994, replaced by the MetroRider)
- Delta single decker (1988–1999)
- MetroRider minibus (1989–2000, replaced by Solo)
- 9000-series minibus on Renault chassis for Leeds City Council (1990, replaced by the MetroRider)
- Spectra double decker (1991–1997, low floor 1997–2005)
- Vecta midibus (1991–1997)
- Sigma (1994–1996, single-deck version of the Spectra)
- Prisma (1995–1998) single decker, Mercedes front
- Excel (1995–1999) (Excel 2 1999–2004, replaced by Tempo)
- Solo low floor midibus (1997–2012, replaced by restyled SR model)
  - (Solo^{+} (2008) Concept only)
  - (Solo EV 2009–2012 Replaced by restyled SR EV model)
- Alero low floor minibus, (Alero 2001–2006, Alero Plus 2006–2008)
- Irisbus Agora Line ((2002–2007) right-hand-drive version bodied by Optare, 23 were built for the UK)
- Tempo single decker (2004–2012)
  - Tempo SR (2011–2020, Oceanian market only since 2017)
- Versa, midibus between Solo and Tempo (2007–2018)
- Esteem single decker (formerly East Lancs Esteem) (2008–2009)
- Olympus double decker (formerly East Lancs Olympus) (2008–2011)
- Visionaire open-top double decker (formerly East Lancs Visionaire) (2008–2011)
- OmniDekka double decker (formerly East Lancs Omnidekka) (2008–2011, only adopted by Nottingham City Transport)
- Rapta double decker ((2009) Concept only)

=== Coaches ===
Discontinued

- Bonito
- Toro
- Solera
- Soroco
- Rapido
- Viedo

=== Pick-up trucks ===
Current

- eLCV Dost
  - eLCV Bada Dost
- IeV Series (IeV 3/IeV4)
