= Optare StarRider =

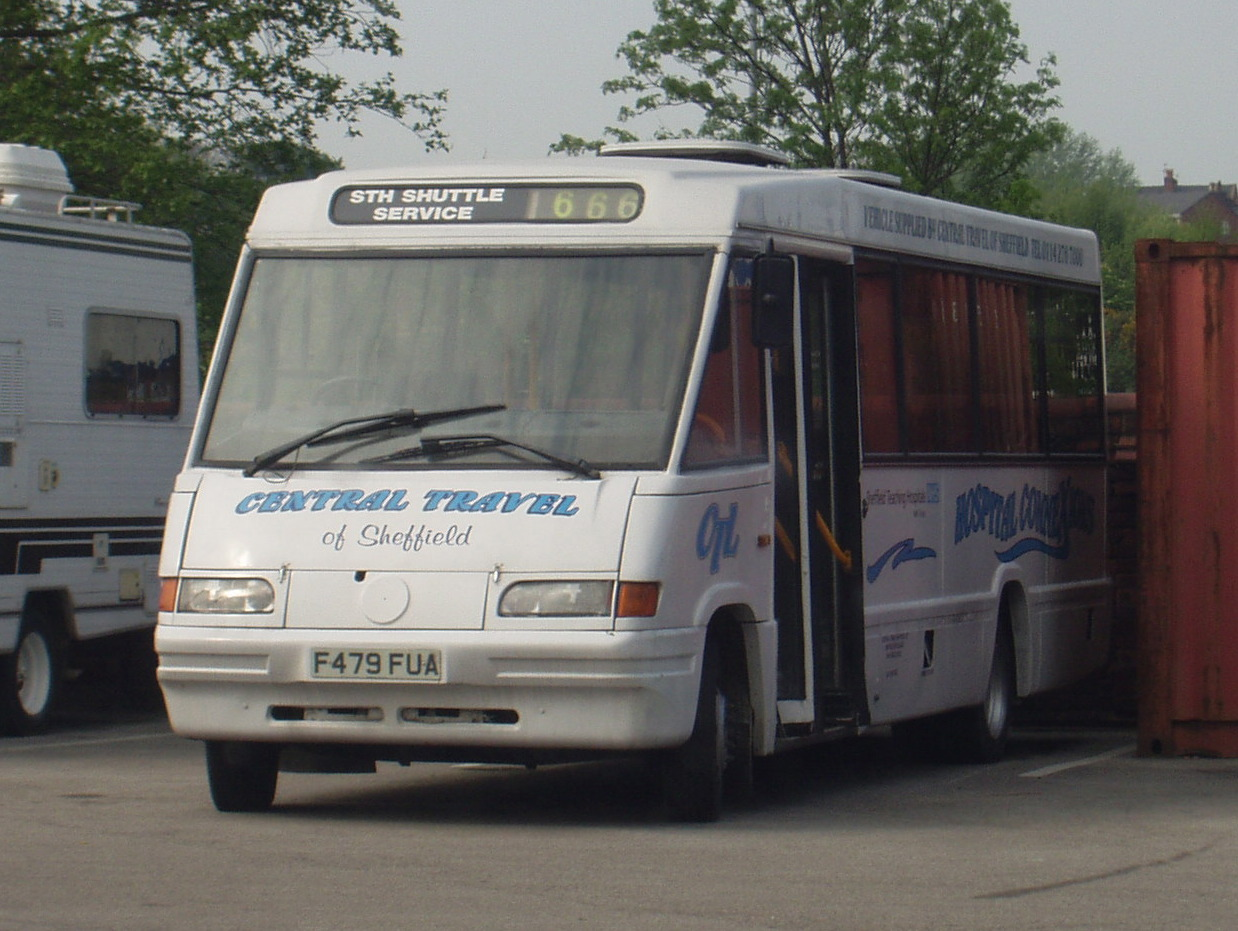
- Central Travel StarRider in 2008

Overview
- Manufacturer: Optare
- Production: 1987 - 1994
- Assembly: Cross Gates

Body and chassis
- Doors: 1
- Floor type: Step entrance
- Chassis: Mercedes-Benz 811D

Dimensions
- Length: 7.0–8.0 metres
- Width: 2.35 metres
- Height: 2.9 metres

Chronology
- Successor: Optare MetroRider

The Optare StarRider was a minibus and minicoach body manufactured by Optare between 1987 and 1994. It was fitted to the Mercedes-Benz 811D chassis, with its body made from a steel frame with aluminium alloy and GPR exterior panels.

It was launched in August 1987. A total of 240 were built, with Badgerline, London Regional Transport and Yorkshire Traction major customers. It was succeeded by the Optare MetroRider in 1994.
