= Ferqui Toro =

Ferqui Toro Ferqui Viedo
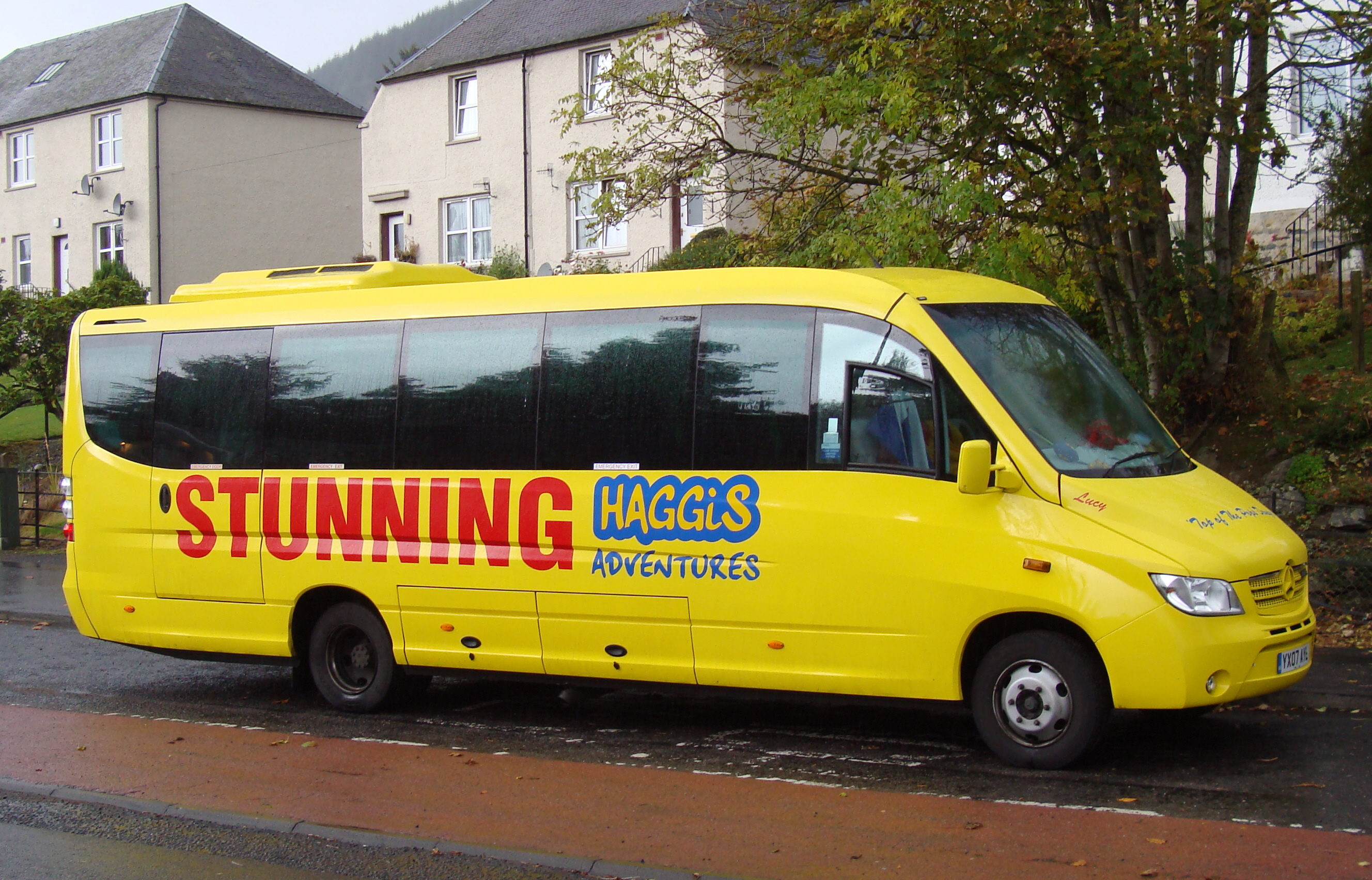

Overview
- Manufacturer: Ferqui
- Also called: W670
- Production: 2005–2014
- Assembly: Ferqui, Spain

Body and chassis
- Class: Minicoach
- Platform: Mercedes-Benz Vario (Toro); Iveco Daily (Viedo)
- Doors: 1 door
- Floor type: Step entrance

Chronology
- Predecessor: Ferqui Rapido
- Successor: Ferqui Sunset X Ferqui Sunrise

The Ferqui Toro and Ferqui Viedo (sold as the Optare Toro and Optare Viedo in the United Kingdom until 2012) were related designs of minicoach bodywork built by Spanish manufacturer Ferqui until 2014, when they were replaced by the Ferqui Sunset X and Ferqui Sunrise. The Toro, built on Mercedes-Benz Vario chassis, was launched in 2005; the Viedo, a lower-cost variant built on Iveco Daily chassis, followed in 2009.

Through a dealership arrangement between Ferqui and Optare, both models were sold and badged as Optare products in the British market from their launch up until the start of 2012, when Optare terminated the agreement to consolidate on their own bus manufacturing. Subsequently, Ferqui signed a dealership contract with Connaught PSV, relaunching both models in the United Kingdom market as Ferqui-badged models by 2013, before they went out of production the following year.

== See also ==
- List of buses
