= Ferqui Solera =

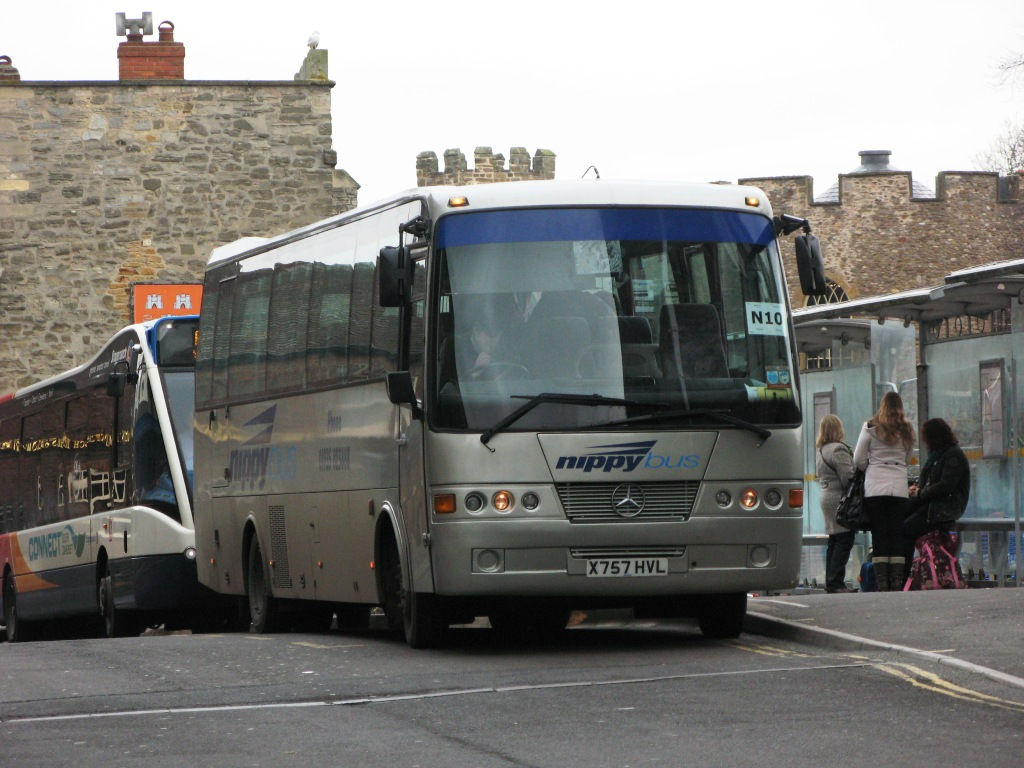

Overview
- Manufacturer: Ferqui
- Production: 1997–2008

Body and chassis
- Class: Midicoach
- Platform: Mercedes-Benz Atego
- Doors: 1 door
- Floor type: Step entrance

Chronology
- Successor: Ferqui Nora

The Ferqui Solera (sold as the Optare Solera in the United Kingdom) was a midicoach built by Spanish manufacturer Ferqui on Mercedes-Benz Atego chassis between 1997 and 2008.

As a result of a dealership arrangement between Ferqui and Optare, the Solera was badged as an Optare product in the United Kingdom throughout its production run.

== Original Solera ==
The original Solera has the characteristic behind front axle door, this gives it an appearance of a very small coach. It has become a popular choice for independent coach companies. It is still available in a slightly updated form to match the styling of the Solera HD.

== Solera HD ==
The Solera HD is a much updated form of the original. It removes the characteristic doorway with a conventional layout with the door ahead of the front axle. The styling has been updated to match the rest of the Optare coach range. The rollbars create a big coach appearance.
