= Solera de Gabaldón =

- municipality
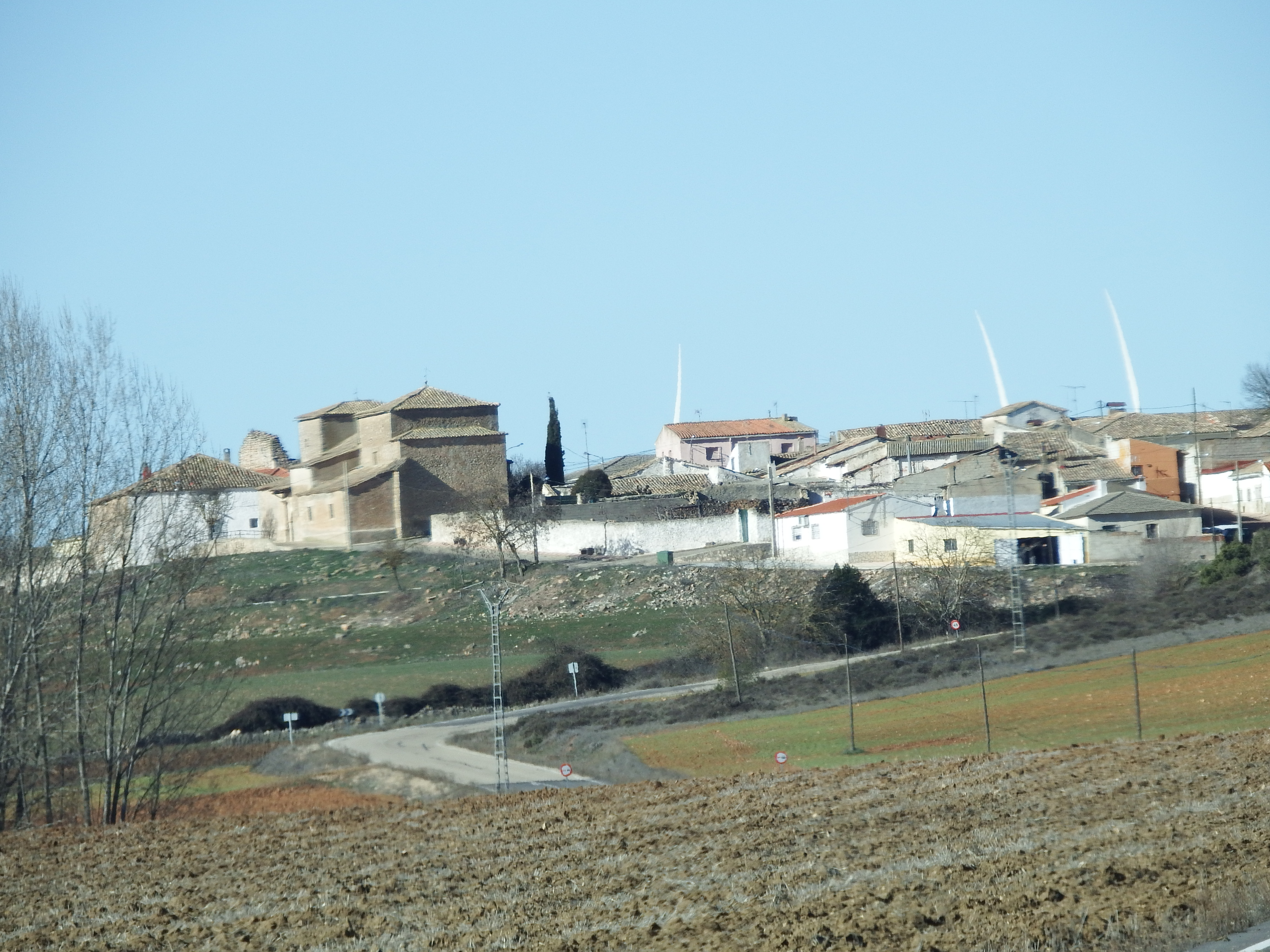

- Location in Spain Solera de Gabaldón (Castilla-La Mancha)
- Coordinates: 39°57′N 1°16′W
- Country: Spain
- Autonomous community: Castile-La Mancha
- Province: Cuenca

Government
  - Mayor: Perpetuo Briz Pérez

Area
  - Total: 50.35 km^{2} (19.44 sq mi)
- Elevation: 1,047 m (3,435 ft)

Population (2025-01-01)
  - Total: 32
  - Density: 0.64/km^{2} (1.6/sq mi)
- Time zone: UTC+1 (CET)
  - Summer (DST): UTC+2 (CEST)

Solera de Gabaldón is a municipality located in the province of Cuenca, Castile-La Mancha, Spain. As of 2010, the municipality has a population of 31 inhabitants.
