= Optare MetroRider =

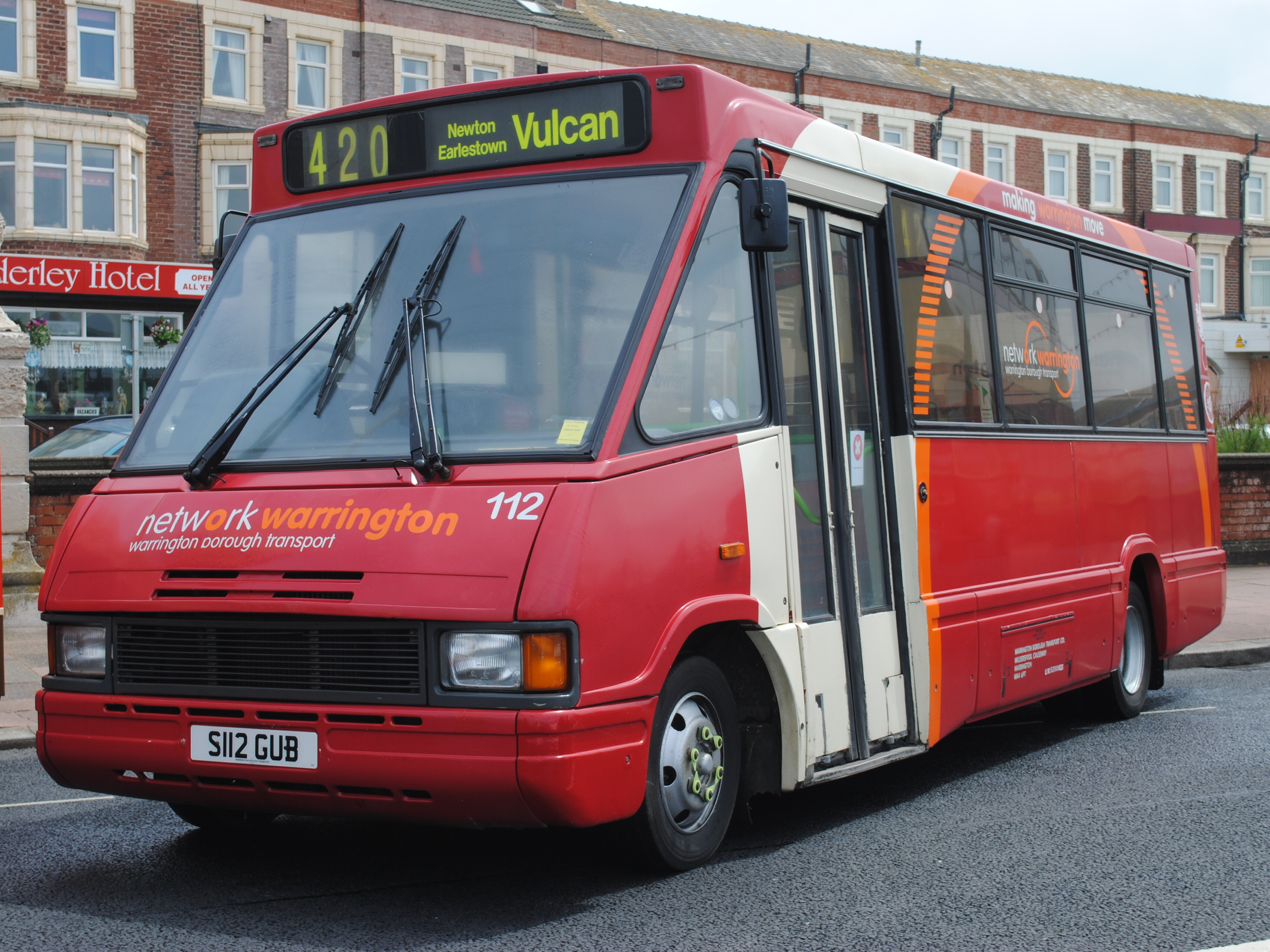
- Warrington Borough Transport MetroRider in Blackpool in June 2013

Overview
- Manufacturer: Optare
- Production: 1989 - 2000
- Assembly: Cross Gates

Body and chassis
- Doors: 1
- Floor type: Step entrance

Powertrain
- Engine: Cummins

Chronology
- Predecessor: MCW Metrorider
- Successor: Optare Solo

The Optare MetroRider is a midibus that was manufactured by Optare (now Switch) between 1989 and 2000.

== History ==
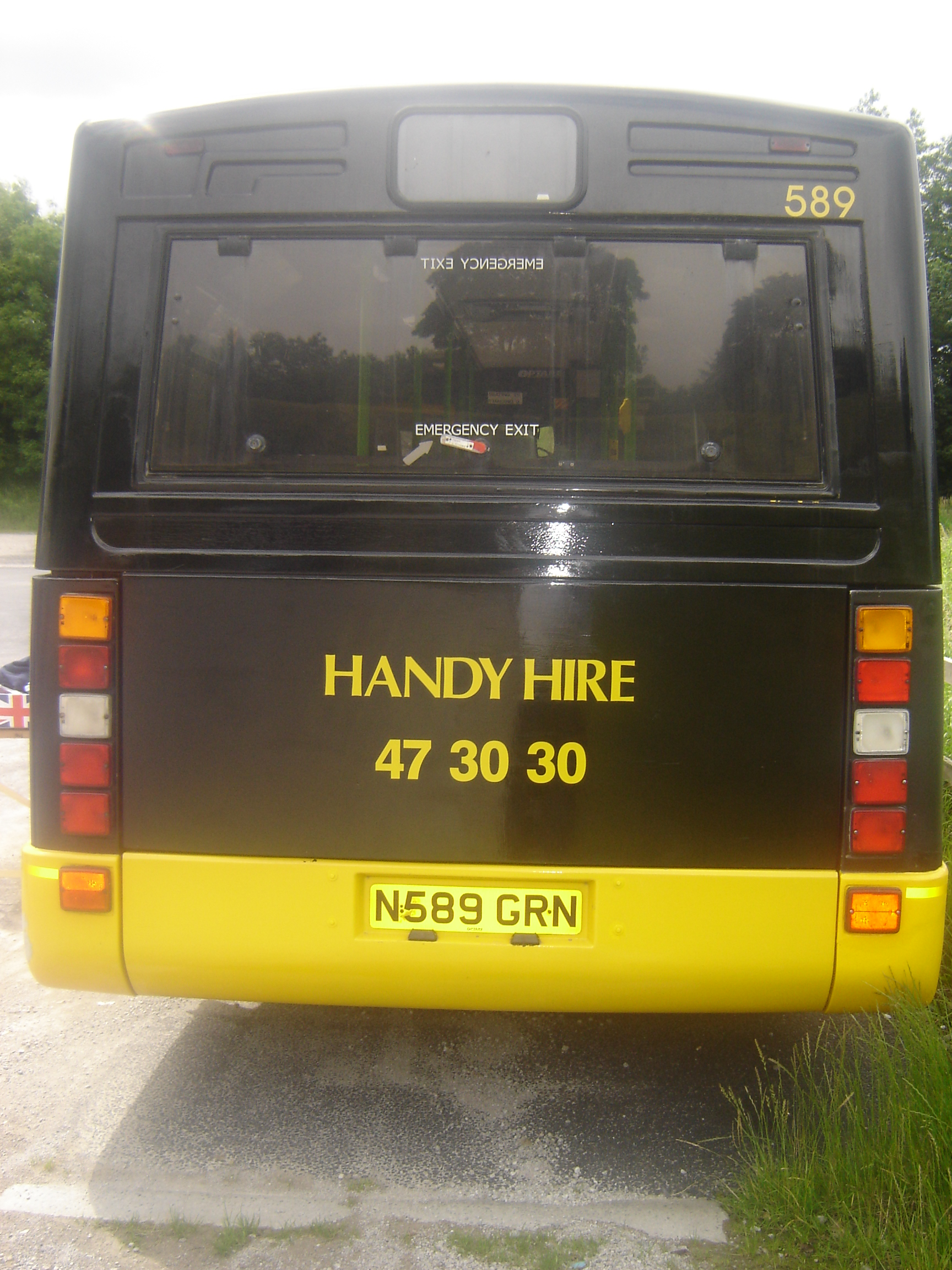
Optare MetroRider rear

Optare based the original design on the MCW Metrorider after it bought the rights from Metro Cammell Weymann after the latter decided to cease production. It was launched in November 1989, with 1,159 produced before it was succeeded by the Optare Solo in 2000.

The MetroRider was an integral bus, with the chassis and body constructed as a single structure. It was sold abroad in kit form, in countries such as Malaysia. Four electric MetroRiders were sold to the Oxford Bus Company in 1993 and two compressed natural gas powered versions were sold to Stagecoach Cambus in 1996.

== Electric version ==
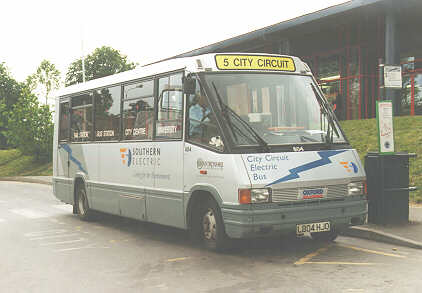
Electric Optare MetroRider in Oxford

An electric version of the MetroRider was produced in 1993. The transport authority placed four vehicles into service on a city centre circular service in Oxford. They were operated initially by the Oxford Bus Company but later briefly passed to Stagecoach Group before withdrawal owing to a cessation of subsidy. They were later used on Jersey and Islay.

== Natural gas version ==
Two MetroRiders were produced for Stagecoach Cambus in Cambridge, powered by a dedicated CNG engine developed by Cummins.
